= List of radio stations in Minnesota =

The following is a list of FCC-licensed radio stations in the U.S. state of Minnesota, which can be sorted by their call signs, frequencies, cities of license, licensees, and programming formats.

== List of radio stations ==
Call sign	Frequency	City of License	Licensee	Format
KADU	90.1 FM	Hibbing	Heartland Christian Broadcasters	Contemporary Inspirational
KAKK	1570 AM	Walker	De La Hunt Media, Inc.	Sports (FSR)
KALY-LP	101.7 FM	Minneapolis	Somali American Community	Ethnic/Somali
KARL	105.1 FM	Tracy	Subarctic Media, LLC	Country
KARP-FM	106.9 FM	Dassel	Iowa City Broadcasting Company, Inc.	Country
KARZ	99.7 FM	Marshall	Subarctic Media, LLC	Classic hits
KASM	1150 AM	Albany	Crystal Media Group, LLC	News Talk Information
KATE	1450 AM	Albert Lea	Alpha 3E Licensee LLC	News Talk Information
KATO-FM	93.1 FM	New Ulm	Subarctic Media, LLC	Classic hits
KAUS	1480 AM	Austin	Alpha 3E Licensee LLC	News Talk Information
KAUS-FM	99.9 FM	Austin	Alpha 3E Licensee LLC	Country
KAXE	91.7 FM	Grand Rapids	Northern Community Radio	Variety
KBAJ	105.5 FM	Deer River	Rapids Radio LLC	Classic rock
KBEK	95.5 FM	Mora	Q Media Properties, LLC	Adult contemporary
KBEM-FM	88.5 FM	Minneapolis	Board of Education, Special School District #1	Jazz
KBEW	1560 AM	Blue Earth	Riverfront Broadcasting of Minnesota, Inc.	Oldies
KBEW-FM	98.1 FM	Blue Earth	Riverfront Broadcasting of Minnesota, Inc.	Country
KBFT	89.9 FM	Nett Lake	Bois Forte Tribal Council	Community radio
KBGY	107.5 FM	Faribault	Carpenter Broadcasting LLC	Classic country
KBHL	103.9 FM	Osakis	Christian Heritage Broadcasting, Inc.	Worship music
KBHP	101.1 FM	Bemidji	HBI Radio Bemidji, LLC	Country
KBHW	99.5 FM	International Falls	Heartland Christian Broadcasters	Christian
KBHZ	91.9 FM	Willmar	Christian Heritage Broadcasting, Inc.	Worship music
KBLB	93.3 FM	Nisswa	HBI Radio Brainerd/Wadena, LLC	Country
KBMO	1290 AM	Benson	Headwaters Media, LLC	News/Talk
KBMW	1450 AM	Breckenridge	I3G Media, LLC	Country
KBMW-FM	92.7 FM	Breckenridge	I3G Media, LLC	Adult contemporary
KBMX	107.7 FM	Proctor	Townsquare License, LLC	Pop contemporary hit radio
KBOT	104.1 FM	Pelican Rapids	Leighton Enterprises, Inc.	Country
KBPG	89.5 FM	Montevideo	Real Presence Radio	Religious
KBPN	88.3 FM	Brainerd	Minnesota Public Radio	News Talk Information
KBPR	90.7 FM	Brainerd	Minnesota Public Radio	Classical
KBRF	1250 AM	Fergus Falls	Leighton Radio Holdings, Inc.	News Talk Information
KBSB	89.7 FM	Bemidji	Bemidji State College	Pop contemporary hit radio
KBUN	1450 AM	Bemidji	HBI Radio Bemidji, LLC	Sports (ESPN)
KBUN-FM	104.5 FM	Blackduck	HBI Radio Bemidji, LLC	Sports
KBVB	95.1 FM	Barnesville	Radio Fargo-Moorhead, Inc.	Country
KBXE	90.5 FM	Bagley	Northern Community Radio, Inc.	Community radio
KCAJ-FM	102.1 FM	Roseau	North Country Media, Inc.	Adult contemporary
KCCD	90.3 FM	Moorhead	Minnesota Public Radio	News Talk Information
KCCM-FM	91.1 FM	Moorhead	Minnesota Public Radio	Classical
KCFB	91.5 FM	St. Cloud	Minnesota Christian Broadcasters, Inc.	Christian
KCGN-FM	101.5 FM	Ortonville	Christian Heritage Broadcasting, Inc.	Worship music
KCHK	1350 AM	New Prague	Ingstad Brothers Broadcasting, LLC	News Talk Information
KCHK-FM	95.5 FM	New Prague	Ingstad Brothers Broadcasting, LLC	Classic country
KCIZ-LP	103.5 FM	Brunswick	Lakes Media Foundation	Variety
KCJL-LP	95.1 FM	Dodge Center	One Day Church Project, Inc.	Christian
KCLD-FM	104.7 FM	St. Cloud	Leighton Enterprises, Inc.	Pop contemporary hit radio
KCLH	94.7 FM	Caledonia	Family Radio, Inc.	Religious
KCLP	101.1 FM	Luverne	Christensen Broadcasting LUV LLC	Mainstream rock
KCMF	89.7 FM	Fergus Falls	Minnesota Public Radio	Classical
KCML	99.9 FM	St. Joseph	Leighton Enterprises, Inc.	Adult contemporary
KCMP	89.3 FM	Northfield	Minnesota Public Radio	Adult album alternative
KCPI	94.9 FM	Albert Lea	Alpha 3E Licensee LLC	Adult contemporary
KCRB-FM	88.5 FM	Bemidji	Minnesota Public Radio	Classical
KCUE	1250 AM	Red Wing	Q Media Group LLC	Classic country
KDAL	610 AM	Duluth	Midwest Communications, Inc.	News Talk Information
KDAL-FM	95.7 FM	Duluth	Midwest Communications, Inc.	Adult contemporary
KDCZ	107.7 FM	St. Charles	Townsquare License, LLC	Classic rock
KDDG	105.5 FM	Albany	Crystal Media Group, LLC	Classic country
KDHL	920 AM	Faribault	Townsquare License, LLC	Classic country
KDIO	1350 AM	Ortonville	Prairie Winds Broadcasting, Inc.	Country
KDIZ	1570 AM	Golden Valley	Caron Broadcasting, Inc.	Conservative talk
KDJS	1590 AM	Willmar	Iowa City Broadcasting Company, Inc.	Sports (FSR)
KDJS-FM	95.3 FM	Willmar	Iowa City Broadcasting Company, Inc.	Country
KDKK	97.5 FM	Park Rapids	De La Hunt Media, Inc.	Adult standards/MOR
KDLB	94.5 FM	Frazee	Radio Fargo-Moorhead, Inc.	Country
KDLM	1340 AM	Detroit Lakes	Leighton Enterprises, Inc.	News Talk Information
KDMA	1460 AM	Montevideo	Iowa City Broadcasting Company, Inc.	Country
KDMA-FM	93.9 FM	Granite Falls	Iowa City Broadcasting Company, Inc.	Country
KDNI	90.5 FM	Duluth	Northwestern College	Christian
KDNW	97.3 FM	Duluth	Northwestern College	Contemporary Christian
KDOC-FM	103.9 FM	Eyota	Townsquare License, LLC	Classic hits
KDOG	96.7 FM	North Mankato	Subarctic Media, LLC	Pop contemporary hit radio
KDOM	1580 AM	Windom	Next Step Broadcasting, Inc.	Classic country
KDOM-FM	94.3 FM	Windom	Next Step Broadcasting, Inc.	Country
KDUZ	1260 AM	Hutchinson	Iowa City Broadcasting Company, Inc.	Country
KDWA	1460 AM	Hastings	K & M Broadcasting, Inc.	Talk/Personality
KDWB-FM	101.3 FM	Richfield	iHM Licenses, LLC	Pop contemporary hit radio
KDWC	800 AM	Luverne	Christensen Broadcasting LUV LLC	Contemporary Christian
KEEY-FM	102.1 FM	St. Paul	iHM Licenses, LLC	Country
KEEZ-FM	99.1 FM	Mankato	Alpha 3E Licensee LLC	Adult contemporary
KEFE-LP	97.9 FM	Lakeville	Rios de Agua Viva Church of God	Spanish Contemporary Christian
KEMJ	101.5 FM	St. James	Subarctic Media, LLC	Hot adult contemporary
KENL-LP	98.1 FM	St. Paul	Enlance Adventista	Spanish Religious
KEYL	1400 AM	Long Prairie	D&K Distributors, Inc.	Country
KFAI	90.3 FM	Minneapolis	Fresh Air, Inc.	Variety
KFAN	1270 AM	Rochester	iHM Licenses, LLC	Sports (FSR)
KFGI	101.5 FM	Crosby	R & J Broadcasting, Inc.	Adult hits
KFIL	1060 AM	Preston	Townsquare License, LLC	Classic country
KFIL-FM	103.1 FM	Chatfield	Townsquare License, LLC	Classic country
KFMC-FM	106.5 FM	Fairmont	City of Lakes Media, Inc.	Classic hits
KFML	94.1 FM	Little Falls	Little Falls Radio Corporation	Active rock
KFNL-FM	104.3 FM	Spring Valley	Townsquare License, LLC	Classic hits
KFOW	1170 AM	Waseca	Main Street Broadcasting, Inc.	Sports
KFSI	92.9 FM	Rochester	Faith Sound, Inc.	Contemporary Christian
KFSP	1230 AM	Mankato	Subarctic Media, LLC	News Talk Information
KFXN	690 AM	Minneapolis	Asian American Broadcasting, LLC	Hmong Language
KFXN-FM	100.3 FM	Minneapolis	iHM Licenses, LLC	Sports (ISN/FSR)
KGAC	91.5 FM	St. Peter	Minnesota Public Radio	Classical
KGFK	1590 AM	East Grand Forks	Leighton Enterprises, Inc.	Classic rock
KGHS	1230 AM	International Falls	R & J Broadcasting, Inc.	Oldies
KGLB	1310 AM	Glencoe	Iowa City Broadcasting Company, Inc.	Classic country
KGLH-LP	96.9 FM	Spicer	Hope Presbyterian Church	Gospel
KGRP	89.7 FM	Grand Rapids	Minnesota Public Radio	News Talk Information
KGSL	95.3 FM	Winona	Leighton Radio Holdings, Inc.	Pop contemporary hit radio
KHWK	1380 AM	Winona	Leighton Radio Holdings, Inc.	Country
KIKV-FM	100.7 FM	Sauk Centre	HBI Radio Alexandria, LLC	Country
KISD	98.7 FM	Pipestone	Christensen Broadcasting, LLC	Oldies
KITF	88.3 FM	International Falls	Minnesota Public Radio	News Talk Information
KITN	93.5 FM	Worthington	Absolute Communications II, L.L.C.	Classic hits
KJGT	88.3 FM	Waconia	Minn-Iowa Christian Broadcasting, Inc.	Variety
KJJK	1020 AM	Fergus Falls	Leighton Radio Holdings, Inc.	Pop contemporary hit radio
KJJK-FM	96.5 FM	Fergus Falls	Leighton Radio Holdings, Inc.	Country
KJLY	104.5 FM	Blue Earth	Minn-Iowa Christian Broadcasting, Inc.	Christian
KJOE	106.1 FM	Slayton	Christensen Broadcasting, LLC	Country
KJOQ	1490 AM	Duluth	Twin Ports Radio, LLC	Worship music
KJTS	88.3 FM	New Ulm	Minn-Iowa Christian Broadcasting Inc.	Contemporary Christian
KJWR	90.9 FM	Windom	Minn-Iowa Christian Broadcasting Inc.	Contemporary Christian
KKAQ	1460 AM	Thief River Falls	Iowa City Broadcasting Company, Inc.	Classic country
KKBJ	1360 AM	Bemidji	R.P. Broadcasting, Inc.	News Talk Information
KKBJ-FM	103.7 FM	Bemidji	R.P. Broadcasting, Inc.	Pop contemporary hit radio
KKCB	105.1 FM	Duluth	Townsquare License, LLC	Country
KKCK	94.7 FM	Springfield	Subarctic Media, LLC	Pop contemporary hit radio
KKCQ	1480 AM	Fosston	R&J Broadcasting, Inc.	Talk/Personality
KKCQ-FM	96.7 FM	Bagley	R&J Broadcasting, Inc.	Country
KKDQ	99.3 FM	Thief River Falls	Iowa City Broadcasting Company, Inc.	Country
KKEQ	107.1 FM	Fosston	Pine to Prairie Broadcasting, Inc.	Contemporary Christian
KKIN	930 AM	Aitkin	R & J Broadcasting, Inc.	Oldies/Classic hits/Adult standards
KKIN-FM	94.3 FM	Aitkin	R & J Broadcasting, Inc.	Classic country
KKJM	92.9 FM	St. Joseph	Gabriel Media	Contemporary Christian
KKLN	94.1 FM	Atwater	Headwaters Media, LLC	Mainstream rock
KKLW	90.9 FM	Willmar	Educational Media Foundation	Contemporary Christian (K-Love)
KKMS	980 AM	Richfield	Caron Broadcasting, Inc.	Christian Talk
KKOJ	1190 AM	Jackson	Community First Broadcasting, LLC	Classic country
KKOK-FM	95.7 FM	Morris	Iowa City Broadcasting Company, Inc.	Country
KKWB	102.5 FM	Kelliher	Bemidji Radio, Inc.	Country
KKWE	89.9 FM	White Earth	White Earth Land Recovery Project	Community radio
KKWQ	92.5 FM	Warroad	Border Broadcasting, L.P.	Country
KKWS	105.9 FM	Wadena	HBI Radio Brainerd/Wadena, LLC	Country
KKZY	95.5 FM	Bemidji	HBI Radio Bemidji, LLC	Adult contemporary
KLCH	94.9 FM	Lake City	Q Media Group, LLC	Oldies
KLCI	106.1 FM	Elk River	Milestone Radio LLC	Classic country
KLDJ	101.7 FM	Duluth	Townsquare License, LLC	Classic hits
KLFD	1410 AM	Litchfield	Mid-Minnesota Media, LLC	Variety
KLFN	106.5 FM	Sunburg	Lakeland Broadcasting Company	Classic hits
KLGR	1490 AM	Redwood Falls	Alpha 3E Licensee LLC	Country
KLGR-FM	97.7 FM	Redwood Falls	Alpha 3E Licensee LLC	Adult hits
KLIZ	1380 AM	Brainerd	HBI Radio Brainerd/Wadena, LLC	Sports (FSR)
KLIZ-FM	107.5 FM	Brainerd	HBI Radio Brainerd/Wadena, LLC	Classic rock
KLKS	100.1 FM	Pequot Lakes	R & J Broadcasting, Inc.	Talk
KLKX-LP	98.5 FM	Alexandria	Alexandria Community Radio Educational Organization, Inc.	Variety
KLLZ-FM	99.1 FM	Walker	HBI Radio Bemidji, LLC	Classic rock
KLOH	1050 AM	Pipestone	Christensen Broadcasting, LLC	Classic country
KLQP	92.1 FM	Madison	Lac Qui Parle Broadcasting Co., Inc.	Country
KLSE	90.7 FM	Rochester	Minnesota Public Radio	Classical
KLTA-FM	98.7 FM	Moorhead	Radio Fargo-Moorhead, Inc.	Adult Top 40
KLTF	960 AM	Little Falls	Little Falls Radio Corporation	News Talk Information
KLZZ	103.7 FM	Waite Park	Townsquare Media Licensee of St. Cloud, Inc.	Classic rock
KMFX-FM	102.5 FM	Lake City	iHM Licenses, LLC	Country
KMFY	96.9 FM	Grand Rapids	Rapids Radio LLC	Adult contemporary
KMGK	107.1 FM	Glenwood	Branstock Communications, Inc.	Country
KMGM	105.5 FM	Montevideo	Iowa City Broadcasting Company, Inc.	Classic rock
KMHL	1400 AM	Marshall	Subarctic Media, LLC	News Talk Information
KMKL	90.3 FM	North Branch	Educational Media Foundation	Contemporary Christian (K-Love)
KMKO-FM	95.7 FM	Lake Crystal	Alpha 3E Licensee LLC	News Talk Information
KMNB	102.9 FM	Minneapolis	Audacy License, LLC	Country
KMNQ	1470 AM	Brooklyn Park	Santamaria Broadcasting, Inc.	Spanish AC
KMNV	1400 AM	St. Paul	Santamaria Broadcasting, Inc.	Regional Mexican
KMOJ	89.9 FM	Minneapolis	Center For Communication & Development	Urban contemporary
KMRS	1230 AM	Morris	Iowa City Broadcasting Company, Inc.	Country
KMSE	88.7 FM	Rochester	Minnesota Public Radio	Adult album alternative
KMSK	91.3 FM	Austin	Mankato State University	News Talk Information
KMSU	89.7 FM	Mankato	Mankato State University	Variety
KMWA	96.3 FM	Edina/Glencoe	Educational Media Foundation	Worship music (Air1)
KMXK	94.9 FM	Cold Spring	Townsquare Media Licensee of St. Cloud, Inc.	Hot adult contemporary
KNBJ	91.3 FM	Bemidji	Minnesota Public Radio	News Talk Information
KNCM	91.3 FM	Appleton	Minnesota Public Radio	News Talk Information
KNGA	90.5 FM	St. Peter	Minnesota Public Radio	News Talk Information
KNLW-LP	98.9 FM	Rochester	New Life Worship Center	Contemporary Christian
KNNZ	89.1 FM	Hawley	Pioneer Public Broadcasting Company, Inc.	Modern rock
KNOF	95.3 FM	St. Paul	Christian Heritage Broadcasting, Inc.	Contemporary Christian
KNOW-FM	91.1 FM	Minneapolis-St. Paul	Minnesota Public Radio	News Talk Information
KNSE	90.1 FM	Austin	Minnesota Public Radio	News Talk Information
KNSG	107.5 FM	Marshall	Subarctic Media, LLC	Sports (FSR)
KNSI	1450 AM	St. Cloud	Leighton Enterprises, Inc.	News Talk Information
KNSP	1430 AM	Staples	HBI Radio Brainerd/Wadena, LLC	Country
KNSR	88.9 FM	Collegeville	Minnesota Public Radio	News Talk Information
KNSW	91.7 FM	Worthington-Marshall	Minnesota Public Radio	News Talk Information
KNTN	102.7 FM	Thief River Falls	Minnesota Public Radio	News Talk Information
KNUJ	860 AM	New Ulm	Ingstad Brothers Broadcasting, LLC	News Talk Information
KNUJ-FM	107.3 FM	Sleepy Eye	Ingstad Brothers Broadcasting, LLC	Classic hits
KNWF	91.5 FM	Fergus Falls	Minnesota Public Radio	News Talk Information
KNXR	97.5 FM	Rochester	Blooming Prairie Farm Radio Inc.	Classic hits
KOJB	90.1 FM	Cass Lake	Leech Lake Band of Ojibwe	Variety
KOLJ-FM	91.1 FM	Wannaska	We Have This Hope Christian Radio, Inc.	Christian
KOLV	100.1 FM	Olivia	Bold Radio, Inc.	Country
KOPJ	89.3 FM	Sebeka	We Have This Hope Christian Radio, Inc.	Christian
KOWZ	100.9 FM	Blooming Prairie	Blooming Prairie Farm Radio Inc.	Adult contemporary
KOZY	1320 AM	Grand Rapids	Rapids Radio LLC	Oldies
KPCS	89.7 FM	Princeton	Pensacola Christian College, Inc.	Christian
KPHR	106.3 FM	Ortonville	Prairie Winds Broadcasting, Inc.	Classic rock
KPJT-LP	99.1 FM	Maple Grove	MG Community Broadcasting	Christian
KPMI	1300 AM	Bemidji	Paskvan Media, Inc.	Classic country
KPMI-FM	94.5 FM	Baudette	Paskvan Media, Inc.	Classic country
KPPS-LP	97.5 FM	St. Louis Park	Park Public Radio, Inc.	Dance/EDM
KPRM	870 AM	Park Rapids	De La Hunt Media, Inc.	Classic country
KPRW	99.5 FM	Perham	Leighton Radio Holdings, Inc.	Adult contemporary
KQAL	89.5 FM	Winona	Winona State University	Variety
KQAQ	970 AM	Austin	Real Presence Radio	Religious
KQCL	95.9 FM	Faribault	Townsquare License, LLC	Classic rock
KQDS-FM	94.9 FM	Duluth	Midwest Communications, Inc.	Classic rock
KQHT	96.1 FM	Crookston	iHM Licenses, LLC	Classic hits
KQIC	102.5 FM	Willmar	Lakeland Broadcasting Company	Hot adult contemporary
KQKK	101.9 FM	Walker	De La Hunt Media, Inc.	Classic hits
KQMN	91.5 FM	Thief River Falls	Minnesota Public Radio	Classical
KQPR	96.1 FM	Albert Lea	D&Z Media, LLC	Classic rock
KQQL	107.9 FM	Anoka	iHM Licenses, LLC	Classic hits
KQRS-FM	92.5 FM	Golden Valley	Radio License Holdings LLC	Classic rock
KQWB-FM	105.1 FM	Breckenridge	Radio Fargo-Moorhead, Inc.	Active rock
KQYB	98.3 FM	Spring Grove	Family Radio, Inc.	Country
KRAM-LP	96.7 FM	Montevideo	Thunderhawk Broadcasting Inc.	Adult album alternative/Hot AC
KRBI-FM	105.5 FM	St. Peter	Alpha 3E Licensee LLC	Classic hits
KRBT	1340 AM	Eveleth	Range Broadcasting, Inc.	Sports (FSR)
KRCH	101.7 FM	Rochester	iHM Licenses, LLC	Classic rock
KRCQ	102.3 FM	Detroit Lakes	Leighton Enterprises, Inc.	Country
KRFF-LP	95.9 FM	Moorhead	Radio Free Fargo LLC	Variety
KRFG	102.9 FM	Nashwauk	University of Northwestern – St. Paul	Contemporary Christian
KRFI	88.1 FM	Redwood Falls	Minnesota Public Radio	News Talk Information
KRFO	1390 AM	Owatonna	Townsquare License, LLC	Classic hits
KRFO-FM	104.9 FM	Owatonna	Townsquare License, LLC	Country
KRGM	89.9 FM	Marshall	University of Northwestern – St. Paul	Contemporary Christian
KRIV-FM	101.1 FM	Winona	Leighton Radio Holdings, Inc.	Classic hits
KRJB	106.5 FM	Ada	R & J Broadcasting	Country
KRJM	101.5 FM	Mahnomen	R & J Broadcasting	Oldies
KRLP	88.1 FM	Windom	Educational Media Foundation	Contemporary Christian (K-Love)
KRLX	88.1 FM	Northfield	Carleton College	Variety
KROC	1340 AM	Rochester	Townsquare License, LLC	News Talk Information
KROC-FM	106.9 FM	Rochester	Townsquare License, LLC	Pop contemporary hit radio
KROX	1260 AM	Crookston	Gopher Communications Company	News Talk Information
KRPR	89.9 FM	Rochester	Rochester Public Radio	Classic rock
KRRW	105.9 FM	Winthrop	Subarctic Media, LLC	Classic country
KRSM-LP	98.9 FM	Minneapolis	Pillsbury United Communities	Variety
KRSU	88.5 FM	Appleton	Minnesota Public Radio	Classical
KRSW	89.3 FM	Worthington	Minnesota Public Radio	Classical
KRUE	92.1 FM	Waseca	Main Street Broadcasting, Inc.	Country
KRVY-FM	97.3 FM	Starbuck	Iowa City Broadcasting Company, Inc.	Adult hits
KRWB	1410 AM	Roseau	Border Broadcasting, L.P.	Classic hits
KRWC	1360 AM	Buffalo	Donnell, Inc.	Full service
KRXW	103.5 FM	Roseau	Minnesota Public Radio	News Talk Information
KSCR-FM	93.5 FM	Benson	Headwaters Media, LLC	Variety
KSDM	104.1 FM	International Falls	R & J Broadcasting, Inc.	Country
KSJN	99.5 FM	Minneapolis	Minnesota Public Radio	Classical
KSJR-FM	90.1 FM	Collegeville	Minnesota Public Radio	Classical
KSKK	1070 AM	Verndale	Verndale Broadcasting LLC	Catholic
KSMR	92.5 FM	Winona	Real Presence Radio	Catholic
KSNR	100.3 FM	Thief River Falls	iHM Licenses, LLC	Country
KSRQ	90.1 FM	Thief River Falls	Northland Community & Technical College	Adult album alternative
KSTP	1500 AM	St. Paul	KSTP-AM, LLC	Sports (ESPN)
KSTP-FM	94.5 FM	St. Paul	KSTP-FM FCC License Sub, LLC	Hot adult contemporary
KSUM	1370 AM	Fairmont	City of Lakes Media, Inc.	Country
KSWJ	90.9 FM	Alexandria	We Have This Hope Christian Radio, Inc.	Christian
KTCO	98.9 FM	Duluth	Midwest Communications, Inc.	Country
KTCZ-FM	97.1 FM	Minneapolis	iHM Licenses, LLC	Alternative rock/Hot AC
KTGT	88.3 FM	Thief River Falls	We Have This Hope Christian Radio, Inc.	Christian
KTIG	102.7 FM	Pequot Lakes	Minnesota Christian Broadcasters, Inc.	Christian
KTIS	900 AM	Minneapolis	Northwestern College	Christian talk
KTIS-FM	98.5 FM	Minneapolis	Northwestern College	Contemporary Christian
KTLK	1130 AM	Minneapolis	iHM Licenses, LLC	News Talk Information
KTMY	107.1 FM	Coon Rapids	KTMY-FM, LLC	Talk/Personality
KTNF	950 AM	St. Louis Park	Jr Broadcasting LLC	Talk/Personality
KTOE	1420 AM	Mankato	Subarctic Media, LLC	News Talk Information
KTRF	1230 AM	Thief River Falls	Iowa City Broadcasting Company, Inc.	News Talk Information
KTRF-FM	94.1 FM	Red Lake Falls	Iowa City Broadcasting Company, Inc.	News Talk Information
KTWH-LP	99.5 FM	Two Harbors	Two Harbors Community Radio	Variety
KUAL-FM	103.5 FM	Brainerd	HBI Radio Brainerd/Wadena, LLC	Oldies
KULO	94.3 FM	Alexandria	HBI Radio Alexandria, LLC	Oldies
KUMM	89.7 FM	Morris	University of Minnesota, Morris	College/Alternative
KUOM	770 AM	Minneapolis	University of Minnesota	College/Alternative
KUOM-FM	106.5 FM	St. Louis Park	Regents of the University of Minnesota	College/Alternative
KUSQ	95.1 FM	Worthington	Absolute Communications II, L.L.C.	Country
KUXX	105.7 FM	Jackson	Community First Broadcasting, LLC	Country
KVBR	1340 AM	Brainerd	HBI Radio Brainerd/Wadena, LLC	News Talk Information
KVCS	89.1 FM	Spring Valley	VCY America, Inc.	Conservative Christian
KVEX-LP	97.5 FM	Saint Cloud	St Cloud State University	1990s' Alternative rock
KVOX-FM	99.9 FM	Moorhead	Midwest Communications, Inc.	Country
KVSC	88.1 FM	St. Cloud	St. Cloud State University	College radio
KVXR	1280 AM	Moorhead	Real Presence Radio	Catholic
KWAD	920 AM	Wadena	HBI Radio Brainerd/Wadena, LLC	Classic country
KWLJ-LP	90.7 FM	Moorhead	Bible Truth Radio, Inc.	Religious Teaching
KWLM	1340 AM	Willmar	Lakeland Broadcasting Company	News Talk Information
KWMN	99.3 FM	Rushford	Leighton Radio Holdings, Inc.	Sports (FSR)
KWNG	105.9 FM	Red Wing	Q Media Group LLC	Classic hits
KWNO	1230 AM	Winona	Leighton Radio Holdings, Inc.	News Talk Information
KWOA	730 AM	Worthington	Absolute Communications II, L.L.C.	Sports
KWWK	96.5 FM	Rochester	Townsquare License, LLC	Country
KXAC	100.5 FM	St. James	Subarctic Media, LLC	Country
KXBR	91.9 FM	International Falls	Heartland Christian Broadcasters	Christian
KXDL	99.7 FM	Browerville	D&K Distributors, Inc.	Oldies
KXKK	92.5 FM	Park Rapids	De La Hunt Media, Inc.	Country
KXLC	91.1 FM	La Crescent	Minnesota Public Radio	News Talk Information
KXLP	94.1 FM	Eagle Lake	Subarctic Media, LLC	Classic rock
KXPM-LP	100.3 FM	Perham	Stanislaus Communications	Catholic
KXRA	1490 AM	Alexandria	Leighton Radio Holdings, Inc.	News Talk Information
KXRA-FM	92.3 FM	Alexandria	Leighton Radio Holdings, Inc.	Classic rock
KXRZ	99.3 FM	Alexandria	Leighton Radio Holdings, Inc.	Adult Top 40/Hot AC
KXSS	1390 AM	Waite Park	Townsquare Media Licensee of St. Cloud, Inc.	Sports (ISN)
KXXR	93.7 FM	Minneapolis	Radio License Holdings LLC	Active rock
KYBA	105.3 FM	Stewartville	Townsquare License, LLC	Adult contemporary
KYCK	97.1 FM	Crookston	Leighton Enterprises, Inc.	Country
KYCR	1440 AM	Golden Valley	Caron Broadcasting, Inc.	Business news
KYEJ	90.1 FM	Fairmont	Fairmont Area Catholic Radio	Catholic
KYES	1180 AM	Rockville	Gabriel Media	Catholic
KYMN	1080 AM	Northfield	Northfield Media, Inc.	News Talk Information
KYSM-FM	103.5 FM	Mankato	Alpha 3E Licensee LLC	Country
KZCR	103.3 FM	Fergus Falls	Leighton Radio Holdings, Inc.	Mainstream rock/AAA
KZIO	104.3 FM	Two Harbors	Minnesota Public Radio	Adult album alternative
KZJK	104.1 FM	St. Louis Park	Audacy License, LLC	Adult hits
KZJZ	106.7 FM	Babbitt	Real Presence Radio	Adult album alternative
KZLT-FM	104.3 FM	East Grand Forks	Leighton Enterprises, Inc.	Adult contemporary
KZPK	98.9 FM	Paynesville	Leighton Enterprises, Inc.	Country
KZRV	96.7 FM	Sartell	Townsquare Media Licensee of St. Cloud, Inc.	Classic hits
KZSE	91.7 FM	Rochester	Minnesota Public Radio	News Talk Information
KZYS-LP	105.1 FM	St. Cloud	Hayaan, Inc.	Ethnic/Somali
WAJC	88.1 FM	Newport	Maranatha Assembly of God Church	Contemporary Christian
WBHR	660 AM	Sauk Rapids	Tri-County Broadcasting, Inc.	Sports (ESPN)
WBJI	98.3 FM	Blackduck	R.P. Broadcasting, Inc.	Country
WBKK	820 AM	Wilton	Real Presence Radio	Catholic
WCCO	830 AM	Minneapolis	Audacy License, LLC	News Talk Information
WCMP	1350 AM	Pine City	Q Media Properties, LLC	Classic country
WCMP-FM	100.9 FM	Pine City	Q Media Properties, LLC	Country
WCTS	1030 AM	Maplewood	Central Baptist Theological Seminary of Minneapolis	Fundamentalist Christian
WDJD	89.9 FM	Aitken	We Have This Hope Christian Radio, Inc.	Christian
WDKE	96.1 FM	Coleraine	Midwest Communications, Inc.	Classic country
WDSE-FM	103.3 FM	Duluth	Duluth–Superior Area Educational Television Corporation	Variety
WEBC	560 AM	Duluth	Townsquare License, LLC	Sports (FSR)
WELY	1450 AM	Ely	Zoe Communications, Inc.	Variety
WELY-FM	94.5 FM	Ely	Zoe Communications, Inc.	Variety
WEQY-LP	104.7 FM	Saint Paul	Dayton's Bluff District Four Community Council	Variety
WEVE-FM	97.9 FM	Eveleth	Midwest Communications, Inc.	Adult contemporary
WFNU-LP	94.1 FM	St. Paul	Thomas Dale District 7 Planning Council	Variety
WGPO	90.1 FM	Grand Portage	Cook County Community Radio Corporation	Community radio
WGRH	88.5 FM	Hinckley	Minnesota Public Radio	Classical
WGVX	105.1 FM	Lakeville	Radio License Holdings LLC	Soft adult contemporary
WGZS	89.1 FM	Cloquet	Fond du Lac Band of Lake Superior Chippewa	Community radio
WHMH-FM	101.7 FM	Sauk Rapids	Tri-County Broadcasting Inc.	Active rock
WHPJ	88.7 FM	Hibbing	We Have This Hope Christian Radio, Inc.	Christian
WINH	91.9 FM	Hinckley	Minnesota Public Radio	News Talk Information
WIRC	89.3 FM	Ely	Minnesota Public Radio	News Talk Information
WIRN	92.5 FM	Buhl	Minnesota Public Radio	News Talk Information
WIRR	90.9 FM	Virginia-Hibbing	Minnesota Public Radio	Classical
WJJY-FM	106.7 FM	Brainerd	HBI Radio Brainerd/Wadena, LLC	Adult contemporary
WJON	1240 AM	St. Cloud	Townsquare Media Licensee of St. Cloud, Inc.	News Talk Information
WJRF	89.5 FM	Duluth	University of Northwestern – St. Paul	Contemporary Christian
WKEK	89.1 FM	Gunflint Lake	Cook County Community Radio Corporation	Community radio
WKLK	1230 AM	Cloquet	Fond du Lac Band of Lake Superior Chippewa	Adult standards/MOR
WKLK-FM	96.5 FM	Cloquet	Fond du Lac Band of Lake Superior Chippewa	Classic rock
WLKX-FM	95.9 FM	Forest Lake	Carpenter Broadcasting LLC	Classic country
WLOL	1330 AM	Minneapolis	Relevant Radio, Inc.	Christian
WLSN	89.7 FM	Grand Marais	Minnesota Public Radio	News Talk Information
WLUP	105.3 FM	Cambridge	Radio License Holdings LLC	Soft adult contemporary
WMCN	91.7 FM	St. Paul	Macalester College	Variety
WMFG	1240 AM	Hibbing	Midwest Communications, Inc.	Adult standards/MOR
WMFG-FM	106.3 FM	Hibbing	Midwest Communications, Inc.	Classic rock
WMIN	1010 AM	Sauk Rapids	Herbert M. Hoppe Revocable Trust	Oldies/Classic hits
WMIS-FM	92.1 FM	Blackduck	Paskvan Media, Inc.	Talk/Personality
WMLA-LP	99.7 FM	Moose Lake	Moose Lake Adventist Broadcasting Corporation	Christian
WMLS	88.7 FM	Grand Marais	Minnesota Public Radio	Classical
WMOZ	106.9 FM	Moose Lake	Fond du Lac Band of Lake Superior Chippewa	Classic hits
WNMT	650 AM	Nashwauk	Midwest Communications, Inc.	News Talk Information
WPVW	1190 AM	Wabasha	Q Media Group, LLC	Country
WQPM	1300 AM	Princeton	Milestone Radio LLC	Classic country
WQRM	850 AM	Duluth	VCY America, Inc.	Conservative Christian
WQRN	88.9 FM	Cook	VCY America Inc.	Conservative Christian
WREY	630 AM	St. Paul	630 Radio, Incorporated	Regional Mexican
WRLN	105.3 FM	Red Lake	Red Lake Nation	Community radio
WROJ-LP	96.1 FM	St. Cloud	Calvary Chapel St. Cloud	Christian rock
WSCD-FM	92.9 FM	Duluth	Minnesota Public Radio	Classical
WSCN	100.5 FM	Cloquet	Minnesota Public Radio	News Talk Information
WTBX	93.9 FM	Hibbing	Midwest Communications, Inc.	Hot adult contemporary
WTIP	90.7 FM	Grand Marais	Cook County Community Radio Corp.	Community radio
WUSG-LP	88.7 FM	Cambridge	Cambridge Adventist Broadcasting Corporation	Christian
WUSZ	99.9 FM	Virginia	Midwest Communications, Inc.	Country
WVAL	800 AM	Sauk Rapids	Tri-County	Classic country
WVIC-LP	99.1 FM	Saint Paul	Victoria Theatre Project	Variety
WWJO	98.1 FM	St. Cloud	Townsquare Media Licensee of St. Cloud, Inc.	Country
WWPE-FM	92.1 FM	Hermantown	Townsquare License, LLC	Classic rock
WWTC	1280 AM	Minneapolis	Salem Media Group, LLC	Talk/Personality
WWWI	1270 AM	Baxter	R & J Broadcasting, Inc.	Talk
WWWI-FM	95.9 FM	Pillager	R & J Broadcasting, Inc.	Country/Adult standards
WWWM-FM	105.7 FM	Eden Prairie	Radio License Holdings LLC	Soft adult contemporary
WXYG	540 AM	Sauk Rapids	Herbert M. Hoppe Revocable Trust	Album-oriented rock
WYNJ	89.5 FM	Blackduck	We Have This Hope Christian Radio, Inc.	Christian
WYRQ-FM	92.1 FM	Little Falls	Little Falls Radio Corporation	Country
WYSG-LP	96.3 FM	Hinckley	Hinckley Adventist Broadcasting Corporation	Christian
WZBY	92.7 FM	Grand Portage	Carpenter Broadcasting LLC	
WZFG	1100 AM	Dilworth	Bakken Beacon Media, LLC	Talk/Personality
WZFJ	104.3 FM	Breezy Point	Minnesota Christian Broadcasters, Inc.	Contemporary Christian

== Defunct ==
- Beat Radio
- KBJI-LP
- KDXL
- KFMX
- KFNK
- KLBB
- KMAP
- KOLM
- KPNP
- KQEP-LP
- KQRB
- KQSP
- KSJU
- KYEJ-LP
- WCAL
- WEEP
- WFNX
- KAWD-LP
- KSJM
