= List of radio stations owned by Townsquare Media =

Townsquare Media is American media company with headquarters in Greenwich, Connecticut. The company operates primarily small- to mid-market radio stations; As of May 2024, the company lists 350 radio stations among its assets. Below is a list of radio stations owned by the company, alphabetized by state.

== Alabama ==
Tuscaloosa
Station	Frequency	Genre
WALJ	105.1	Urban contemporary
WFFN	95.3	Country
WQRR	101.7	Christian adult contemporary
WTBC	1230/100.9	Sports
WTSK	790/93.3	Gospel
WTUG-FM	92.9	Urban adult contemporary
WTUG-FM-HD2	100.1	Classic Country
WTUG-FM-HD3	97.5	Oldies

== Arizona ==
Sierra Vista
Station	Frequency	Genre
KWCD	92.3	Country
KTAN	1420/98.1	Classic rock
KZMK	100.9	Contemporary hit radio

== Arkansas ==
Texarkana
Station	Frequency	Genre
KKYR-FM	102.5	Country
KMJI	93.3	Urban adult contemporary
KPWW	95.9	Mainstream top 40
KYGL	106.3	Classic rock

== Colorado ==
Fort Collins
Station	Frequency	Genre
KARS-FM	102.9	Rhythmic top 40 (owned by The Fort Collins/Lafayette Divestiture Trust)
KKPL	99.9	Hot adult contemporary
KMAX-FM	94.3	Active rock
KTRR	102.5	Classic Hits
KUAD-FM	99.1	Country

Grand Junction
Station	Frequency	Genre
KBKL	107.9	Classic hits
KEKB	99.9	Modern country
KKNN	95.1	Mainstream rock
KMXY	104.3	Hot adult contemporary

Montrose
Station	Frequency	Genre
KKXK	94.1	Country
KSNN	103.7	Contemporary hit radio
KUBC	580/104.5	Classic rock

== Connecticut ==
Danbury
Station	Frequency	Genre
WDBY	105.5	Today's country
WRKI	95.1	Classic rock

== Idaho ==
Boise
Station	Frequency	Genre
KAWO	104.3	Country
KCIX	105.9	Hot adult contemporary
KFXD	630/105.5	Rhythmic contemporary
KIDO	580/107.5	News, talk
KSAS-FM	103.5	Contemporary hit radio, top 40
KXLT-FM	107.9	Adult contemporary

Twin Falls
Station	Frequency	Genre
KEZJ-FM	95.7	Country
KLIX	1310/96.1	News, talk, information
KLIX-FM	96.5	Classic hits
KSNQ	98.3	Classic rock

== Illinois ==
Quincy/Hannibal (Missouri)
Station	Frequency	Genre
KHMO	1070	News, talk, sports
KICK-FM	97.9	Country
KRRY	100.9	Classic Rock
WLIQ	1530	Classic country

Rockford
Station	Frequency	Genre
WKGL-FM	96.7	Classic rock
WROK	1440	News, talk
WXXQ	98.5	Country
WZOK	97.5	Contemporary hit radio

== Indiana ==
Evansville
Station	Frequency	Genre
WDKS	106.1	Top 40 mainstream
WGBF	1280	Slient
WGBF-FM	103.1	Mainstream rock
WJLT	105.3	Hot Adult contemporary
WKDQ	99.5	Country

== Iowa ==
Cedar Rapids
Station	Frequency	Genre
KDAT	104.5	Adult contemporary
KHAK	98.1	Country
KRNA	94.1	Classic rock

Dubuque
Station	Frequency	Genre
KLYV	105.3	Contemporary hit radio, top 40
KXGE	102.3	Mainstream rock
WDBQ	1490	News, talk
WDBQ-FM	107.5	Classic hits
WJOD	103.3	Country

Quad Cities
Station	Frequency	Genre
KBEA-FM	99.7	Contemporary hit radio
KIIK-FM	104.9	Country
KJOC	93.5	Active Rock
WXLP	96.9	Classic rock

Waterloo
Station	Frequency	Genre
KCRR	97.7	Classic rock
KKHQ-FM	98.5	Contemporary hit radio
KOEL	950	News, talk
KOEL-FM	92.3	Country

== Kentucky ==
Owensboro
Station	Frequency	Genre
WBKR	92.5	Country
WOMI	1490/99.1	News, talk, information

== Louisiana ==
Lafayette
Station	Frequency	Genre
KFTE	105.1	Classic Rock
KHXT	107.9	Rhythmic contemporary
KMDL	97.3	Country
KPEL	1420	Sports
KPEL-FM	96.5	News, talk
KROF	960	Talk
KTDY	99.9	Adult contemporary

Lake Charles
Station	Frequency	Genre
KHLA	92.9	Classic hits
KJMH	107.5	Urban adult contemporary
KLCL	1470	Talk
KNGT	99.5	Modern country
KTSR	92.1	Christian adult contemporary

Shreveport
Station	Frequency	Genre
KEEL	710/101.7	News, talk, information
KRUF	94.5	Top 40, contemporary hit radio
KTUX	98.9	Classic rock
KVKI-FM	96.5	Adult contemporary
KWKH	1130	Sports
KXKS-FM	93.7	Country

== Maine ==
Augusta/Waterville
Station	Frequency	Genre
WEBB	98.5	Country
WJZN	1400/95.9	Alternative rock
WMME-FM	92.3	Top 40 (contemporary hit radio)

Bangor
Station	Frequency	Genre
WBZN	107.3	Top 40 (contemporary hit radio)
WDEA	1370	Adult standards
WEZQ	92.9	Sports
WQCB	106.5	Country
WWMJ	95.7	Classic rock

Portland
Station	Frequency	Genre
WBLM	102.9	Classic rock
WCYY	94.3	Alternative rock
WHOM	94.9	Adult contemporary
WJBQ	97.9	Contemporary hit radio, top 40
WPKQ	103.7	Alternative rock

Presque Isle
Station	Frequency	Genre
WBPW	96.9	Country
WOZI	101.9	Classic rock
WQHR	96.1	Hot adult contemporary

== Massachusetts ==
Berkshires
Station	Frequency	Genre
WBEC	1420/93.9	News, talk, sports
WBEC-FM	95.9	Contemporary hit radio
WNAW	1230/94.7	Country
WSBS	860/94.1	Adult contemporary
WUPE-FM	100.1	Classic hits

New Bedford/Fall River
Station	Frequency	Genre
WBSM	1420	News, talk, sports
WFHN	107.1	Contemporary hit radio

== Michigan ==
Battle Creek
Station	Frequency	Genre
WBCK	95.3	Sports
WBXX	104.9	Urban adult contemporary

Flint
Station	Frequency	Genre
WCRZ	107.9	Adult contemporary
WQUS	103.1	Sports
WRCL	93.7	Rhythmic contemporary hit radio
WWBN	101.5	Mainstream rock

Grand Rapids
Station	Frequency	Genre
WFGR	98.7	Sports
WGRD-FM	97.9	Mainstream rock
WLHT-FM	95.7	Hot adult contemporary
WNWZ	1410/104.9	Urban contemporary
WTRV	100.5	Gold-Leaning Soft AC

Kalamazoo
Station	Frequency	Genre
WKFR-FM	103.3	Contemporary hit radio, top 40
WKFR-FM-HD2	102.5	Urban adult contemporary
WKMI	1360	Sports
WRKR	107.7	Classic rock

Lansing
Station	Frequency	Genre
WFMK	99.1	Adult contemporary
WITL-FM	100.7	Country
WJIM	1240	Sports
WJIM-FM	97.5	Contemporary hit radio, top 40
WMMQ	94.9	Classic rock
WVFN	730	Sports, talk

== Minnesota ==
Duluth
Station	Frequency	Genre
KBMX	107.7	Hot AC
KKCB	105.1	Country
KLDJ	101.7	Classic hits
WEBC	560/106.5	Sports
WWPE-FM	92.1	Active rock

Faribault/Owatonna
Station	Frequency	Genre
KDHL	920/97.9	Classic country
KQCL	95.9	Rock
KRFO	1390/94.7	Oldies
KRFO-FM	104.9	Country

Rochester
Station	Frequency	Genre
KDCZ	107.7	Classic rock
KDOC-FM	103.9	Classic hits
KFIL	1060	Country
KFIL-FM	103.1	Country
KFNL-FM	104.3	Classic hits
KROC	1340/96.9	News, talk
KROC-FM	106.9/106.5	Top 40, contemporary hit radio
KWWK	96.5	Country
KYBA	105.3/104.9	Adult contemporary

St. Cloud
Station	Frequency	Genre
KLZZ	103.7	Classic rock
KMXK	94.9	Hot adult contemporary
KXSS	1390/93.9	Sports
KZRV	96.7	Classic hits
WJON	1240/95.3	News, talk
WWJO	98.1	Country

== Missouri ==
Sedalia
Station	Frequency	Genre
KSDL	92.3	Adult Contemporary
KSIS	1050	News, talk
KXKX	105.7	Country

== Montana ==
Billings
Station	Frequency	Genre
KBUL	970/103.3	News, talk
KCHH	95.5/95.1	Adult contemporary
KCTR-FM	102.9	Country
KKBR	97.1	Hot adult contemporary
KMHK	103.7	Classic rock

Bozeman
Station	Frequency	Genre
KISN	96.7	Top 40, contemporary hit radio
KMMS	1450/95.1	News, talk
KMMS-FM	94.7	Adult album alternative
KPRK	1340	Talk
KXLB	100.7/98.7	Country
KZMY	103.5	Hot adult contemporary

Butte
Station	Frequency	Genre
KAAR	92.5	Country
KMBR	95.5	Classic rock
KMTZ	107.7	Adult hits
KXTL	1370/94.7	Talk

Great Falls
Station	Frequency	Genre
KAAK	98.9	Top 40, contemporary hit radio
KLFM	92.9	Classic hits
KMON	560	Classic country
KMON-FM	94.5	Country
KMON-FM HD2	107.5	Alternative rock
KMON-FM HD3	99.9	Sports
KMON-FM HD4	103.9	Active rock
KVVR	97.9	Adult contemporary

Missoula
Station	Frequency	Genre
KBAZ	96.3	Mainstream rock
KGGL	93.3	Country
K245AP	96.9	Top 40, contemporary hit radio
K239AP	95.7	Alternative rock
KGRZ	1450/92.7	Sports
KGVO	1290/98.3	News, talk
KMPT	930/99.7	Talk
KYSS-FM	94.9/98.1	Country
KZOQ-FM	100.1	Classic rock

Shelby
Station	Frequency	Genre
KSEN	1150	Oldies
KZIN-FM	96.7	Country

== New Hampshire ==
Portsmouth
Station	Frequency	Genre
WOKQ	97.5/97.9	Country
WSAK	102.1	Classic hits
WSHK	105.3	Classic hits

== New Jersey ==
Atlantic City/Cape May
Station	Frequency	Genre
WENJ	97.3	Sports
WENJ-HD4	104.1	Classic rock
WFPG	96.9	Adult contemporary
WPGG	1450/95.5	Talk radio
WPUR	107.3	Country
WSJO	104.9	Adult leaning Top-40

Monmouth/Ocean
Station	Frequency	Genre
WCHR-FM	105.7	Classic rock
WJLK	1160/104.1	Oldies
WJLK-FM	94.3	Hot AC
WOBM	1310/96.7	Oldies
WOBM-FM	92.7	Adult contemporary

Trenton
Station	Frequency	Genre
WCHR	1040	Religious
WKXW	101.5	News, talk (weekdays), Classic hits (weekends)
WPST	94.5	Top 40 (CHR)

== New York ==
Albany
Station	Frequency	Genre
WGNA-FM	107.7	Country
WPBZ-FM	103.9	Hot adult contemporary
WQBK-FM	105.7	Classic rock
WQBK-FM-HD2	99.1	Urban contemporary
WQSH	103.5	Classic rock
WTMM-FM	104.5	Sports

Binghamton
Station	Frequency	Genre
WAAL	99.1	Classic rock
WHWK	98.1	Country
WNBF	1290	News, talk
WWYL	104.1	Top 40

Buffalo
Station	Frequency	Genre
WBLK	93.7	Urban contemporary
WBUF	92.9	Mainstream rock
WTSS	96.1	Adult contemporary
WYRK	106.5	Country

Oneonta
Station	Frequency	Genre
WBKT	95.3	New country
WDLA	1270	News, talk
WDLA-FM	92.1	Country
WDOS	730	News, talk
WKXZ	93.9/94.3/99.3	Hot adult contemporary
WSRK	103.9	Adult contemporary
WZOZ	103.1	Classic hits

Poughkeepsie
Station	Frequency	Genre
WCZX	97.7	Country
WEOK	1390/95.7	Spanish Adult Hits
WKXP	94.3	Soft AC
WPDA	106.1	Classic rock
WPDH	101.5/95.7/97.3/106.3	Classic rock
WRRB	96.9	Alternative rock
WRRV	92.7	Alternative rock
WZAD	97.3	Country

Utica/Rome
Station	Frequency	Genre
WFRG-FM	104.3	Country
WIBX	950	News, talk
WLZW	98.7	Adult contemporary
WODZ-FM	96.1	Classic hits
WOUR	96.9	Classic rock

== North Dakota ==
Bismarck
Station	Frequency	Genre
KACL	98.7	Classic hits
KBYZ	96.5	Classic rock
KKCT	97.5	Top 40 (contemporary hit radio)
KLXX	1270	Talk
KUSB	103.3	Country

Williston
Station	Frequency	Genre
KEYZ	660/103.3	News, talk, classic country
KTHC	95.1	Top 40 (contemporary hit radio)
KYYZ	96.1	Country

== Oklahoma ==
Lawton
Station	Frequency	Genre
KLAW	101.3	Country
KVRW	107.3	Contemporary hit radio/Top 40
KZCD	94.1	Mainstream rock

== South Dakota ==
Sioux Falls
Station	Frequency	Genre
KIKN-FM	100.5	Country
KKLS-FM	104.7	Top 40, contemporary hit radio
KKRC-FM	97.3	Classic hits
KSOO	1000/102.3	Sports
KSOO-FM	99.1	Country
KXRB	1140	Classic country
KXRB-FM	100.1	Classic country
KYBB	102.7	Classic rock

== Texas ==
Abilene
Station	Frequency	Genre
KEAN-FM	105.1	Country
KEYJ-FM	107.9	Mainstream rock
KMWX	92.5	Texas country
KULL	100.7	Classic hits
KYYW	1470/94.7	News, talk

Amarillo
Station	Frequency	Genre
KATP	101.9	Country
KIXZ	940	News, talk, information
KMXJ-FM	94.1	Adult contemporary
KPRF	98.7	Classic hits
KXSS-FM	96.9	Contemporary hit radio, top 40

El Paso
Station	Frequency	Genre
KLAQ	95.5	Mainstream rock
KROD	600	Sports
KSII	93.1	Hot adult contemporary

Killeen/Temple
Station	Frequency	Genre
KLTD	101.7	Adult hits
KOOC	106.3	Rhythmic contemporary
KSSM	103.1	Urban adult contemporary
KTEM	1400	News, talk, sports
KUSJ	105.5	Country

Lubbock
Station	Frequency	Genre
KFMX-FM	94.5	Mainstream rock
KFYO	790/95.1	News, talk
KKAM	1340/103.9	News, talk, sports
KKCL-FM	98.1	Classic Hits
KQBR	99.5	Country
KZII-FM	102.5	Top 40, contemporary hit radio

Lufkin
Station	Frequency	Genre
KAFX-FM	95.5	Top 40, contemporary hit radio
KSFA	860/104.5	News, talk
KTBQ	107.7	Classic rock
KYKS	105.1	Country

Odessa/Midland
Station	Frequency	Genre
KBAT	99.9	Classic rock
KMND	1510/99.5	Sports
KNFM	92.3	Country
KODM	97.9	Hot adult contemporary
KZBT	93.3	Contemporary hit radio rhythmic

San Angelo
Station	Frequency	Genre
KELI	98.7	Contemporary hit radio/Top 40
KGKL	960	Sports
KGKL-FM	97.5	Country
KKCN	103.1	Country
KNRX	96.5	Mainstream rock

Tyler/Longview
Station	Frequency	Genre
KISX	107.3	Urban adult contemporary
KKTX-FM	96.1	Classic rock
KNUE	101.5	Country
KTYL-FM	93.1	Adult top 40

Victoria
Station	Frequency	Genre
KIXS	107.9	Country
KLUB	106.9	Tejano
KQVT	92.3	Contemporary hit radio, top 40
KTXN-FM	98.7	Adult hits

Wichita Falls
Station	Frequency	Genre
KBZS	106.3	Mainstream rock
KNIN-FM	92.9	Contemporary hit radio, top 40
KWFS	1290/96.3	News, talk, sports
KWFS-FM	102.3	Country

== Utah ==
St. George
Station	Frequency	Genre
KCIN	94.9/96.7/99.3/103.7	Country
KDXU	890/92.5	News, talk
KDXU-FM	106.1	News, talk
KIYK	107.3/94.9	Country
KREC	98.1/96.5/98.5	Adult contemporary
KSUB	590/107.3	News, talk
KXBN	92.1/102.3/104.3	Contemporary hit radio, top 40

== Washington ==
Richland/Kennewick/Pasco
Station	Frequency	Genre
KEYW	98.3	Hot adult contemporary
KFLD	870/98.7	News, talk, information
KONA	610	News, talk
KONA-FM	105.3	Contemporary hit radio, top 40
KORD-FM	102.7	Country
KXRX	97.1	Mainstream rock
KZHR	92.5	Spanish adult hits

Wenatchee
Station	Frequency	Genre
KKWN	106.7	Talk
KPQ	560/101.7	News, talk
KPQ-FM	102.1	Classic rock
KAPL-FM	99.5	Adult contemporary
KWNC	1370	Talk
KWWW-FM	96.7/103.9	Contemporary hit radio
KYSN	97.7	Country
KYSP	1340	Sports

Yakima
Station	Frequency	Genre
KATS	94.5/94.3	Mainstream rock
KDBL	92.9	Country
KFFM	107.3	Contemporary hit radio
KIT	1280	News, talk, information
KMGW	99.3	Classic hits

== Wyoming ==
Casper
Station	Frequency	Genre
KKTL	1400	Classic country
KRNK	96.7	Mainstream rock
KRVK	107.9	Adult hits
KTRS-FM	104.7	Top 40 (CHR)
KTWO	1030	Full service
KWYY	95.5	Country

Cheyenne
Station	Frequency	Genre
KGAB	650	News, talk, information
KIGN	101.9	Classic rock
KLEN	106.3	Top 40 (CHR)

Laramie
Station	Frequency	Genre
KCGY	95.1	Country
KOWB	1290	News, talk, information
