= Mass media in Rochester, Minnesota =

Media in the Rochester, Minnesota area includes:

== Print ==
The city newspaper is the Post-Bulletin, an afternoon paper which publishes Monday through Saturday. The city magazine is the monthly Rochester Magazine.

== Online ==
Med City Beat, an online-only news service, launched in 2014 and covers local government, business and culture.

== Radio ==
=== FM radio ===
FM radio stations
Frequency	Call sign	Name	Format	Owner
88.7	KMSE (KCMP Simulcast)	89.3 The Current	Adult Album Alternative	Minnesota Public Radio
89.1	KVCS	VCY America	Christian	VCY America
89.9	KRPR	89.9 KRPR	Classic rock	Rochester Public Radio
90.7	KLSE	Classical MPR	Classical	Minnesota Public Radio
91.7; 91.7 HD-2	KZSE	MPR News; Classical MPR	NPR; Classical	Minnesota Public Radio
92.9	KFSI		Christian	Faith Sound Incorporated
93.5	K228FY (KFAN-AM Translator)	The Fan	Sports/Sports Talk	Clear Channel Communications
94.3	K232EK (KTIS-FM Translator)	Life 98.5	Contemporary Christian music	University of Northwestern - St. Paul
96.5	KWWK	Quick Country 96.5	Country	Townsquare Media
96.9	K245CX (KROC-AM Translator)	News Talk 1340	News/Talk	Townsquare Media
97.5	KNXR	Minnesota 97.5	Classic hits	Blooming Prairie Farm Radio Inc.
98.9	KNLW	New Life 98.9	Christian	Mercy Hill Church
101.7	KRCH	Laser 101.7	Classic rock	Clear Channel Communications
102.5	KMFX	102.5 The Fox	Country	Clear Channel Communications
103.9	KDOC	Fun 104	Classic hits	Townsquare Media
104.3	KFNL-FM	Fun 104	Classic hits	Townsquare Media
104.9	K285EL (KYBA Translator)	Y105	AC	Townsquare Media
105.3	KYBA	Y105	AC	Townsquare Media
105.7	K289BO (KJCY Translator)	Kinship Christian Radio	Christian	Minn-Iowa Christian Broadcasting, Inc.
106.5	K293CV (KROC-FM Translator)		CHR	Townsquare Media
106.9	KROC		CHR	Townsquare Media
107.7	KDCZ	Sasquatch	Classic rock	Townsquare Media

=== AM radio ===
AM radio stations
Frequency	Call sign	Name	Format	Owner
1270	KFAN	The Fan	Sports/Sports Talk	Clear Channel Communications
1340	KROC	News Talk 1340	News/Talk	Townsquare Media
1520	KOLM	1520 The Ticket	Sports/Sports Talk	Townsquare Media

=== NOAA All Hazard radio ===
- 162.475 MHz (ch. 4) WXK41 (ERP: 1 kW). Olmsted County SAME code is 027109.

== Television ==
Channel	Callsign	Affiliation	Branding	Subchannels		Owner
(Virtual)	Callsign	Affiliation	Branding	Channel	Programming	Owner
3.1	KIMT	CBS	KIMT 3	3.2; 3.3; 3.4 3.5 3.5	MyNet; Ion; Antenna TV Story Television Catchy Comedy	Allen Media Broadcasting
6.1	KAAL	ABC	KAAL 6	6.2; 6.3; 6.4; 6.5	Start TV; Defy; Bounce; Ion	Hubbard Broadcasting
10.1	KTTC; K29OE-D; K30RA-D; K30QY-D	NBC	KTTC 10	10.2; 10.3; 10.4; 10.5; 10.6	CW+ H&I; Court TV; True Crime Network; Outlaw	Gray Television
15.1	KSMQ	PBS	KSMQ	15.2; 15.3; 15.4	Deutsche Welle; Create; Minnesota Channel	KSMQ Public Service Media, Inc.
24.1	KYIN	PBS	Iowa PBS	24.2; 24.3; 24.4	PBS Kids; World; Create	Iowa Public Broadcasting Board
35.1	KXSH-LD	Telemundo	Telemundo	35.2; 35.3; 35.4; 35.5 35.6	Daystar; QVC; TeleXitos; Jewelry TV SBN	SagamoreHill Broadcasting
47.1	KXLT	FOX	FOX 47	47.2; 47.3; 47.4; 47.5; 47.6; 47.7	MeTV; MeTV Toons; Ion Mystery; Quest; Grit Laff	Gray Television
58.1	K25NK-D	3ABN	3ABN	58.2; 58.3; 58.4; 58.5; 58.6; 58.7	3ABN Proclaim; 3ABN Dare to Dream; 3ABN Latino; 3ABN Radio; 3ABN Radio Latino; Radio 74	Three Angels Broadcasting Network

Rochester is on the fringe of the broadcast area of many Twin Cities radio and television stations, as well as the La Crosse/Eau Claire market.

The Rochester area is served by cable company Charter Communications.
