= KOLM =

- Rochester, Minnesota; United States
- Frequency: 1520 kHz
- Branding: 1520 The Ticket

Programming
- Format: Sports
- Affiliations: Infinity Sports Network; Rochester Honkers

Ownership
- Owner: Townsquare Media; (Townsquare License, LLC)
- Sister stations: KDCZ; KDOC-FM; KFIL; KFIL-FM; KWWK; KROC; KROC-FM; KYBA

History
- First air date: October 14, 1963
- Last air date: April 1, 2025
- Former call signs: KKEE (1977–1979)

Technical information
- Licensing authority: FCC
- Facility ID: 50288
- Class: B
- Power: 10,000 watts day and critical hours; 800 watts night
- Transmitter coordinates: 43°59′10″N 92°25′3″W (day and critical hours); 43°59′16″N 92°25′40″W (night)

Links
- Public license information: Public file; LMS
- Website: www.1520theticket.com

KOLM (1520 AM, "1520 The Ticket") was a sports formatted radio station in Rochester, Minnesota, and was owned by Townsquare Media. KOLM derived a portion of its programming from Infinity Sports Network.

== History ==
On October 14, 1963, KOLM signed on the air as the third radio station in Rochester, owned by Olmsted County Broadcasting Company.

In June 1977, KOLM changed its call letters to KKEE. The station later reverted back to KOLM on April 9, 1979, due to people referring the old call letters, rather than KKEE.

On August 30, 2013, a deal was announced in which Townsquare Media would acquire 53 Cumulus Media stations, including KOLM, for $238 million. The deal was part of Cumulus' acquisition of Dial Global; Townsquare and Dial Global were both controlled by Oaktree Capital Management. The sale to Townsquare was completed on November 14, 2013.

Townsquare Media took KOLM silent on April 1, 2025, claiming changes in market economic conditions. The Federal Communications Commission cancelled the station’s license on April 2, 2026.
