= WKLK =

WKLK can refer to:

- WKLK (AM), a radio station (1230 AM) licensed to Cloquet, Minnesota, United States
- WKLK-FM, a radio station (96.5 FM) licensed to Cloquet, Minnesota, United States
