= KFIL =

KFIL may refer to:

- KFIL (AM), a radio station (1060 AM) licensed to serve Preston, Minnesota, United States
- KFIL-FM, a radio station (103.1 FM) licensed to serve Chatfield, Minnesota, United States
