= KRFO =

KRFO may refer to:

- KRFO (AM), a radio station (1390 AM) licensed to Owatonna, Minnesota, United States
- KRFO-FM, a radio station (104.9 FM) licensed to Owatonna, Minnesota, United States
