= KCHK =

KCHK may refer to:

- KCHK (AM), a radio station (1350 AM) licensed to serve New Prague, Minnesota, United States
- KCHK-FM, a radio station (95.5 FM) licensed to serve New Prague, Minnesota
