= List of media in Minnesota =

List of media in Minnesota shows media by city in the U.S. state of Minnesota. Media includes newspapers, radio stations, and television stations. All county seats and cities with media sections are shown.

Media by city in Minnesota
Media in City	County
Aitkin	Aitkin
Anoka	Anoka
Detroit Lakes	Becker
Bemidji	Beltrami
Foley	Benton
Sauk Rapids	Benton
Ortonville	Big Stone
Mankato	Blue Earth
New Ulm	Brown
Carlton	Carlton
Moose Lake	Carlton
Chanhassen	Carver
Chaska	Carver
Walker	Cass
Montevideo	Chippewa
Center City	Chisago
Fargo-Moorhead	Clay
Moorhead	Clay
Bagley	Clearwater
Grand Marais	Cook
Windom	Cottonwood
Brainerd	Crow Wing
Lakeville	Dakota
Hastings	Dakota
Mantorville	Dodge
Alexandria	Douglas
Blue Earth	Faribault
Preston	Fillmore
Albert Lea	Freeborn
Red Wing	Goodhue
Elbow Lake	Grant
Minneapolis	Hennepin
Bloomington	Hennepin
Minneapolis-Saint Paul	Hennepin, Ramsey
Caledonia	Houston
Park Rapids	Hubbard
Cambridge	Isanti
Grand Rapids	Itasca
Jackson	Jackson
Mora	Kanabec
Willmar	Kandiyohi
Hallock	Kittson
International Falls	Koochiching
Madison	Lac qui Parle
Two Harbors	Lake
Baudette	Lake of the Woods
Le Center	Le Sueur
Ivanhoe	Lincoln
Marshall	Lyon
Mahnomen	Mahnomen
Warren	Marshall
Fairmont	Martin
Glencoe	McLeod
Litchfield	Meeker
Milaca	Mille Lacs
Little Falls	Morrison
Austin	Mower
Slayton	Murray
St. Peter	Nicollet
Worthington	Nobles
Ada	Norman
Rochester	Olmsted
Fergus Falls	Otter Tail
Thief River Falls	Pennington
Pine City	Pine
Pipestone	Pipestone
Grand Forks, North Dakota	Polk
Crookston	Polk
Glenwood	Pope
New Brighton	Ramsey
Saint Paul	Ramsey
Red Lake Falls	Red Lake
Redwood Falls	Redwood
Olivia	Renville
Faribault	Rice
Luverne	Rock
Roseau	Roseau
Duluth	Saint Louis
Virginia	Saint Louis
Hibbing	Saint Louis
Prior Lake	Scott
Shakopee	Scott
Elk River	Sherburne
Gaylord	Sibley
St. Cloud	Stearns
Owatonna	Steele
Morris	Stevens
Benson	Swift
Long Prairie	Todd
Wheaton	Traverse
Wabasha	Wabasha
Wadena	Wadena
Waseca	Waseca
Stillwater	Washington
St. James	Watonwan
Breckenridge	Wilkin
Winona	Winona
Buffalo	Wright
Granite Falls	Yellow Medicine

== Media companies and associations ==
- Minnesota Public Television Association

== See also ==
- List of newspapers in Minnesota
- List of Minnesota Public Radio affiliates
- List of radio stations in Minnesota
- List of television stations in Minnesota
