= List of radio stations in the United States =

Radio stations in United States have evolved since their early twentieth-century origins. In 1920 8MK started operations in Detroit; after it, thousands of private and public radio have operated in the United States. The lists of radio stations in the US are organized in a number of ways; some of them are the following:

== Stations by state ==
- List of radio stations in Alabama
- List of radio stations in Alaska
- List of radio stations in Arizona
- List of radio stations in Arkansas
- List of radio stations in California
- List of radio stations in Colorado
- List of radio stations in Connecticut
- List of radio stations in Delaware
- List of radio stations in Florida
- List of radio stations in Georgia (U.S. state)
- List of radio stations in Hawaii
- List of radio stations in Idaho
- List of radio stations in Illinois
- List of radio stations in Indiana
- List of radio stations in Iowa
- List of radio stations in Kansas
- List of radio stations in Kentucky
- List of radio stations in Louisiana
- List of radio stations in Maine
- List of radio stations in Maryland
- List of radio stations in Massachusetts
- List of radio stations in Michigan
- List of radio stations in Minnesota
- List of radio stations in Mississippi
- List of radio stations in Missouri
- List of radio stations in Montana
- List of radio stations in Nebraska
- List of radio stations in Nevada
- List of radio stations in New Hampshire
- List of radio stations in New Jersey
- List of radio stations in New Mexico
- List of radio stations in New York
- List of radio stations in North Carolina
- List of radio stations in North Dakota
- List of radio stations in Ohio
- List of radio stations in Oklahoma
- List of radio stations in Oregon
- List of radio stations in Pennsylvania
- List of radio stations in Rhode Island
- List of radio stations in South Carolina
- List of radio stations in South Dakota
- List of radio stations in Tennessee
- List of radio stations in Texas
- List of radio stations in Utah
- List of radio stations in Vermont
- List of radio stations in Virginia
- List of radio stations in Washington
- List of radio stations in Washington, D.C. (Note: Washington, D.C. is a federal district.)
- List of radio stations in West Virginia
- List of radio stations in Wisconsin
- List of radio stations in Wyoming
- List of radio stations in U.S. territories (Note: U.S. territories are sub-national administrative divisions.)

== Stations in the United States by call sign ==
- List of AM radio stations in the United States by call sign (initial letters KA–KF)
- List of AM radio stations in the United States by call sign (initial letters KG–KM)
- List of AM radio stations in the United States by call sign (initial letters KN–KS)
- List of AM radio stations in the United States by call sign (initial letters KT–KZ)
- List of AM radio stations in the United States by call sign (initial letters WA–WF)
- List of AM radio stations in the United States by call sign (initial letters WG–WM)
- List of AM radio stations in the United States by call sign (initial letters WN–WS)
- List of AM radio stations in the United States by call sign (initial letters WT–WZ)
- List of FM radio stations in the United States by call sign (initial letters KA–KC)
- List of FM radio stations in the United States by call sign (initial letters KD–KF)
- List of FM radio stations in the United States by call sign (initial letters KG–KJ)
- List of FM radio stations in the United States by call sign (initial letters KK–KM)
- List of FM radio stations in the United States by call sign (initial letters KN–KP)
- List of FM radio stations in the United States by call sign (initial letters KQ–KS)
- List of FM radio stations in the United States by call sign (initial letters KT–KV)
- List of FM radio stations in the United States by call sign (initial letters KW–KZ)
- List of FM radio stations in the United States by call sign (initial letters WA–WC)
- List of FM radio stations in the United States by call sign (initial letters WD–WF)
- List of FM radio stations in the United States by call sign (initial letters WG–WJ)
- List of FM radio stations in the United States by call sign (initial letters WK–WM)
- List of FM radio stations in the United States by call sign (initial letters WN–WP)
- List of FM radio stations in the United States by call sign (initial letters WQ–WS)
- List of FM radio stations in the United States by call sign (initial letters WT–WV)
- List of FM radio stations in the United States by call sign (initial letters WW–WZ)

== Other lists ==
- Channel 6 radio stations in the United States
- List of 50 kW AM radio stations in the United States
- List of Air1 stations
- List of college radio stations in the United States
- List of community radio stations in the United States
- List of jazz radio stations in the United States
- List of non-profit radio stations in the United States
- List of NPR stations
- List of Pacifica Radio stations and affiliates
- List of radio stations owned by Cumulus Media
- List of radio stations owned by Townsquare Media
- List of Spanish Broadcasting System radio stations
- List of United States radio networks
- List of unlicensed high school radio stations

== See also ==
- Radio in the United States
- Media of the United States
- List of radio stations in Canada
