= KDOC =

KDOC may refer to:

- KDOC-TV, religious television station licensed to Anaheim, California
- KDOC-FM, radio station licensed to Eyota, Minnesota
- Kansas Department of Corrections
