= KBNG =

KBNG may refer to:

- KBNG-LP, a low-power radio station (90.9 FM) licensed to serve Bangs, Texas, United States; see List of radio stations in Texas
- KSNN, a radio station (103.7 FM) licensed to serve Ridgway, Colorado, United States, which held the call sign KBNG from 1999 to 2012
