= KRDS =

KRDS may refer to:

- KRDS (FM), a radio station (104.1 FM) licensed to serve Silverton, Colorado, United States
- KCHK-FM, a radio station (95.5 FM) licensed to serve New Prague, Minnesota, United States, which held the call sign KRDS-FM from 2002 to 2013
