= KRAQ =

KRAQ may refer to:

- KRAQ-LP, a low-power radio station (100.1 FM) licensed to serve Rancho Mirage, California, United States
- KUXX, a radio station (105.7 FM) licensed to serve Jackson, Minnesota, United States, which held the call sign KRAQ from 1989 to 2015
