= KUBC =

Radio station in Montrose–Grand Junction, Colorado

- Montrose, Colorado; United States
- Broadcast area: Grand Junction, Colorado
- Frequency: 580 kHz
- Branding: KUBC The Canyon

Programming
- Format: Classic rock

Ownership
- Owner: Townsquare Media; (Townsquare License, LLC)
- Sister stations: KKXK; KSNN

History
- First air date: 1947
- Former frequencies: 1240 kHz (1947–1951); 1260 kHz (1951–1957)

Technical information
- Licensing authority: FCC
- Facility ID: 73626
- Class: B
- Power: 5,000 watts (day); 1,000 watts (night)
- Transmitter coordinates: 38°25′32″N 107°52′59.2″W
- Translator: 104.5 K283CZ (Montrose)

Links
- Public license information: Public file; LMS
- Webcast: Listen live
- Website: www.kubcthecanyon.com

KUBC (580 kHz "KUBC The Canyon") is a radio station in Montrose, Colorado, broadcasting a classic rock format. The station is owned by Townsquare Media through Townsquare License, LLC.

== History ==
On February 19, 2020, KUBC changed its format from news/talk to classic hits, branded as "KUBC Gold". KUBC is simulcast on FM translator K283CZ 104.5 FM Montrose.

On April 3, 2023, KUBC changed its format from classic hits to classic rock, branded as "KUBC The Canyon".
