= WQHR =

Coordinates: 46.548°N 67.809°W

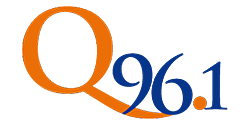
- Presque Isle, Maine; United States
- Broadcast area: Aroostook County, Maine, Western New Brunswick
- Frequency: 96.1 MHz
- Branding: Q 96.1

Programming
- Format: CHR
- Affiliations: Compass Media Networks; Westwood One

Ownership
- Owner: Townsquare Media; (Townsquare Media Presque Isle License, LLC)
- Sister stations: WBPW, WOZI

History
- First air date: 1981 (as WTMS)
- Former call signs: WTMS (1981–1995)
- Call sign meaning: Q for Q96, HR for Hit Radio

Technical information
- Licensing authority: FCC
- Facility ID: 9422
- Class: C
- ERP: 95,000 watts
- HAAT: 390 meters

Links
- Public license information: Public file; LMS
- Webcast: Listen Live
- Website: q961.com

WQHR (96.1 FM) is an American radio station in Presque Isle, Maine. It is a CHR formatted station owned by Townsquare Media. It currently carries The Bob and Sheri Show. The transmitter is in Mars Hill, Maine.
