= WMOZ =

Radio station in Moose Lake, Minnesota

- Moose Lake, Minnesota; United States
- Broadcast area: Cloquet, Minnesota
- Frequency: 106.9 MHz
- Branding: 106.9 The Moose

Programming
- Format: Classic hits
- Affiliations: AP News; Minnesota Twins

Ownership
- Owner: Fond du Lac Band of Lake Superior Chippewa
- Sister stations: WKLK-FM, WKLK

History
- First air date: 1999 (as KBFH)
- Former call signs: KBFH (1998–2002)
- Former frequencies: 107.1 MHz (1999-2000)

Technical information
- Licensing authority: FCC
- Facility ID: 614
- Class: A
- ERP: 6,000 watts
- HAAT: 50 meters (164 feet)
- Transmitter coordinates: 46°30′20″N 92°40′45″W

Links
- Public license information: Public file; LMS
- Website: wmoz-fm.com

WMOZ (106.9 FM, "106.9 The Moose") is a radio station licensed to serve Moose Lake, Minnesota. The station is owned by Fond du Lac Band of Lake Superior Chippewa. It airs a classic hits music format.

The station was assigned the WMOZ call letters by the Federal Communications Commission on June 26, 2002.

== History ==
The station originated as a Moose Lake FM construction permit on 107.1 MHz. FCCInfo lists the original construction-permit application for Facility ID 614 as filed on March 24, 1993, and granted on August 18, 1995. The station's first call sign, KBFH, is listed in FCCInfo call-sign history as first used on May 15, 1998.

Agate Broadcasting, Inc., headed by Alan Quarnstrom, initially attempted to build KBFH as a higher-power facility. In April 1999, Upper Midwest Broadcasting reported that KBFH had applied to reduce its proposed facilities to 100 watts, with an antenna 16 meters below average terrain, in order to get on the air before its construction permit expired. The same report said the existing construction permit had called for 25,000 watts at 100 meters and that Agate had encountered local difficulty securing approval for a tower site. FCCInfo lists a license-to-cover application for KBFH on 107.1 MHz as filed on August 5, 1999, and granted on November 22, 1999.

The station's early programming consisted of a simulcast of co-owned WKLK-FM in Cloquet. In February 2000, Upper Midwest Broadcasting reported that KBFH was rebroadcasting WKLK-FM, then operating a hot adult contemporary format as "K96.5".

KBFH moved from 107.1 MHz to 106.9 MHz as the result of an FCC allotment proceeding involving WIXK-FM. In that rulemaking, the FCC reallotted WIXK-FM's Channel 296C2 from New Richmond, Wisconsin, to Coon Rapids, Minnesota. To accommodate the move, the FCC substituted Channel 295A for Channel 296A at Moose Lake and modified KBFH's authorization to specify operation on Channel 295A. The rule change became effective November 13, 2000. FCCInfo later lists license and modification filings for the station on 106.9 MHz.

The WMOZ call sign became effective on June 26, 2002, replacing KBFH. In January 2003, after years of low-power operation as a WKLK-FM relay, WMOZ increased to 6,000 watts at 50 meters above average terrain and launched its own satellite-delivered country format as "Moose 106.9", carrying Associated Press news at the top of the hour.

The country format lasted less than a year. On November 26, 2003, WMOZ changed to oldies as "Oldies 106.9", using programming from Jones Radio Network.

FCCInfo records show additional facility and ownership activity in the mid-2000s, including a 2005 assignment-of-authorization filing and later 2005–2006 facility filings identifying QB Broadcasting, Ltd. as applicant. In 2012, the FCC granted the voluntary assignment of WMOZ's license from QB Broadcasting, Ltd. to the Fond du Lac Band of Lake Superior Chippewa.

As of 2026, WMOZ is licensed as a commercial Class A FM station on 106.9 MHz, channel 295A, at Moose Lake, Minnesota. FCCInfo lists the station with 6,000 watts ERP at 50 meters HAAT, using an omnidirectional antenna, with the Fond du Lac Band of Lake Superior Chippewa as licensee. Nielsen Audio's Spring 2026 Station Information Profile identifies WMOZ as "Oldies 106.9 The Moose" with a classic hits format.

== Programming ==
In addition to its usual music programming, WMOZ carries local high school sports and certain professional sports broadcasts of regional interest. As of the 2007-2008 baseball season, WMOZ is an affiliate of the Minnesota Twins radio network.
