= KJCY =

Coordinates: 43°21′52″N 92°51′04″W

- St. Ansgar, Iowa; United States
- Broadcast area: Mason City, Iowa; Austin, Minnesota
- Frequency: 95.5 MHz
- Branding: Kinship Christian Radio

Programming
- Format: Christian Radio

Ownership
- Owner: Minn-Iowa Christian Broadcasting, Inc.

History
- Call sign meaning: Know Jesus Cares for You

Technical information
- Licensing authority: FCC
- Facility ID: 84242
- Class: A
- ERP: 6,000 watts
- HAAT: 100 meters (330 ft)

Links
- Public license information: Public file; LMS
- Webcast: Listen live
- Website: kinshipradio.org/home

KJCY is a Christian radio station licensed to St. Ansgar, Iowa, broadcasting on 95.5 FM. KJCY serves the areas of Mason City, Iowa, and Austin, Minnesota. The station is owned by Minn-Iowa Christian Broadcasting, Inc.

== Translators ==
Call sign	Frequency	City of license	FID	ERP (W)	Class	FCC info
K223AB	92.5 FM	Mason City, Iowa	24943	225	D	LMS
K255AN	98.9 FM	Hayfield, Minnesota	3342	250	D	LMS
K289BO	105.7 FM	Rochester, Minnesota	152440	115	D	LMS
