= KNXR =

Classic hits radio station in Rochester, Minnesota

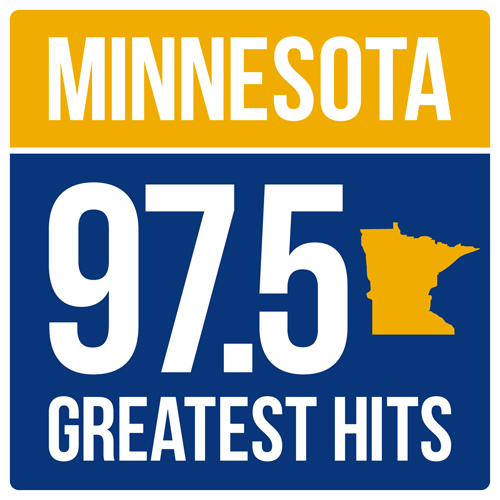
- Rochester, Minnesota; United States
- Broadcast area: Southeast Minnesota
- Frequency: 97.5 MHz
- Branding: Minnesota 97.5

Programming
- Format: Classic hits

Ownership
- Owner: John Linder and Lynn Ketelsen; (Blooming Prairie Farm Radio Inc.)

History
- First air date: December 24, 1965

Technical information
- Licensing authority: FCC
- Facility ID: 68823
- Class: C
- ERP: 100,000 watts
- HAAT: 317 meters (1,040 ft)
- Transmitter coordinates: 44.041°N 92.340°W

Links
- Public license information: Public file; LMS
- Webcast: Listen Live
- Website: mn975.com

KNXR (97.5 MHz) is a commercial FM radio station in Rochester, Minnesota. It broadcasts a classic hits radio format and is owned by John Linder and Lynn Ketelsen, through Blooming Prairie Farm Radio, Inc. The radio studios and offices are on 16th Avenue NW in Rochester.

The transmitter site and tower are on 70th Avenue NE (County Highway 119) at Silver Creek Road in Rochester. With its effective radiated power (ERP) of 100,000 watts and 317 meters (1,040 ft) in height above average terrain (HAAT), KNXR can be heard through much of southern Minnesota, western Wisconsin and northern Iowa.

== History ==
=== Beautiful Music ===
KNXR signed on the air on Christmas Eve, December 24, 1965. The station had a beautiful music format and had its studios in the Rochester Holiday Inn. KNXR played quarter hour sweeps of mostly instrumental cover versions of popular songs, as well as Broadway and Hollywood show tunes. It also featured John Doremus' program Patterns in Music, weeknights from 7 to 10 pm. Over time, more soft vocals were added to the playlist although the station remained largely instrumental until January 31, 2015.

The station's first hour was rebroadcast on Christmas Eve 2015, to mark the 50th anniversary of the station's first radio broadcast. While operating as an easy listening station, KNXR had a devoted following, on the strongest FM signal in Rochester. It often made the Arbitron ratings for the Minneapolis-St. Paul radio market, 85 miles away.

=== Ownership change; flip to Hot AC ===
In October 2014, longtime owner Thomas H. Jones announced he would sell KNXR for $1.1 million to Hometown Broadcasting, which, at the time, owned KQAQ and KQPR in Albert Lea (the former has since been sold to Real Presence Radio, while the latter has been sold to D&Z Media). The sale closed on January 30, 2015, and KNXR went silent at 1 a.m. the following day. On February 24, 2015, after a couple of hours of stunting with the local audio feed from NOAA Weather Radio, KNXR flipped to a Hot Adult Contemporary format, branded as "97.5 Pulse FM". Jones retained the station's vast Easy Listening music library, and some of the personality programming, in an online streaming station at 97five.net.

Despite the station's ratings improving, the "Pulse FM" format was short lived. In December 2015, Hometown Broadcasting announced it would sell KNXR for $3.2 million to Lynn Ketelsen and John Linder's Blooming Prairie Farm Radio (owners of KOWZ (now KFOW) and KOWZ-FM in Blooming Prairie). The sale was completed on February 29, 2016.

=== Classic hits ===
On March 4, 2016, at midnight, KNXR began stunting with a loop of "Tie Me Kangaroo Down, Sport" by Rolf Harris, along with recorded announcements that a "new radio station is coming to Rochester." The station promoted its new format to launch at noon on March 7.

At the promised time, KNXR flipped to classic hits as “Minnesota 97.5". The first song under the new format was "Hotel California" by The Eagles.

== See also ==
- List of radio stations in Minnesota
