= WBPW =

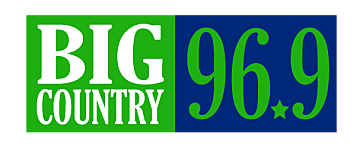
- Presque Isle, Maine; United States
- Broadcast area: Aroostook County, Maine
- Frequency: 96.9 MHz
- Branding: Big Country 96.9

Programming
- Format: Country
- Affiliations: Compass Media Networks; Motor Racing Network

Ownership
- Owner: Townsquare Media; (Townsquare Media Licensee of Peoria, Inc.)
- Sister stations: WOZI, WQHR

History
- First air date: 1973 (as WDHP)
- Former call signs: WDHP (1973–1990)
- Call sign meaning: The PW was sought when the station was called Power 96

Technical information
- Licensing authority: FCC
- Facility ID: 22184
- Class: C1
- ERP: 100,000 watts
- HAAT: 131 meters (430 ft)
- Transmitter coordinates: 46.764°N 67.989°W

Links
- Public license information: Public file; LMS
- Webcast: Listen Live
- Website: bigcountry969.com

WBPW (96.9 FM), branded as "Big Country 96.9", is an American radio station in Presque Isle, Maine. It is a country music-formatted station and is owned by Townsquare Media. The station carries NASCAR races from the Motor Racing Network.

== Former logos ==
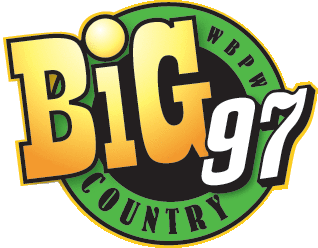
