= KKOJ =

- Jackson, Minnesota; United States
- Broadcast area: Southwest Minnesota; Northwest Iowa
- Frequency: 1190 kHz
- Branding: True Country

Programming
- Format: Classic country
- Affiliations: Fox News Radio

Ownership
- Owner: Dakota Broadcasting, LLC; (Community First Broadcasting, LLC)
- Sister stations: KUXX

History
- First air date: 1980

Technical information
- Licensing authority: FCC
- Facility ID: 35056
- Class: D
- Power: 5,000 watts day
- Transmitter coordinates: 43°31′45″N 95°0′5″W
- Translator: 97.7 K249EO (Spirit Lake, Iowa)

Links
- Public license information: Public file; LMS
- Webcast: Listen Live
- Website: kkoj.com

KKOJ (1190 AM) is a radio station broadcasting a classic country music format. It is licensed to Jackson, Minnesota, United States. The station is licensed to Community First Broadcasting, LLC. KKOJ provides coverage of local high school athletics, specifically focusing on the Jackson County Central (JCC) Huskies.

== History ==
KKOJ first signed on the air in 1980, serving Jackson, Minnesota, and the surrounding Southwest Minnesota and Northwest Iowa regions.

For many years, the station operated under the ownership of Dakota Broadcasting, LLC. In early 2016, the station and its sister station (then KRAQ) were acquired by Community First Broadcasting, LLC, a group that operates several stations across the "Iowa Great Lakes" and Southern Minnesota region. On January 11, 2022, KKOJ shifted its musical focus from a standard country format to its current Classic Country format, branded as "True Country."
