= KEYL =

- Long Prairie, Minnesota; United States
- Broadcast area: Alexandria, Minnesota
- Frequency: 1400 kHz
- Branding: Hometown Radio 1400 AM

Programming
- Format: Country
- Affiliations: Fox News Radio

Ownership
- Owner: Doug Frauenholtz; (D&K Distributors, Inc.)
- Sister stations: KXDL

History
- First air date: 1959 (as KLOP)
- Former call signs: KLOP (1958–1959)

Technical information
- Licensing authority: FCC
- Facility ID: 53300
- Class: C
- Power: 1,000 watts unlimited
- Transmitter coordinates: 45°57′45″N 94°52′9″W
- Translator: 103.1 K276GS (Long Prairie)

Links
- Public license information: Public file; LMS
- Website: KEYL website

KEYL (1400 AM) is a radio station broadcasting a Country music format. Licensed to Long Prairie, Minnesota, United States, the station serves the Alexandria, MN area. The station is currently owned by Doug Frauenholtz, through licensee D&K Distributors, Inc. They also air Fox News at 6, 7 & 8 AM, Noon and 5 PM.

Logo before translator sign on
