= KKXK =

Radio station in Montrose, Colorado

- Montrose, Colorado; United States
- Frequency: 94.1 MHz
- Branding: 94 Kix Country

Programming
- Format: Country music
- Affiliations: Compass Media Networks; Premiere Networks; United Stations Radio Networks; Westwood One

Ownership
- Owner: Townsquare Media; (Townsquare License, LLC)
- Sister stations: KSNN, KUBC

History
- First air date: 1977; 49 years ago
- Former call signs: KUBC-FM (1977–1981)

Technical information
- Licensing authority: FCC
- Facility ID: 73624
- Class: C
- ERP: 100,000 watts
- HAAT: 574.0 meters (1,883.2 ft)
- Transmitter coordinates: 38°20′16″N 107°38′23″W
- Translators: 94.3 K232BW (Telluride); 94.5 K233AH (Ouray); 99.3 K257AS (Ridgway); 99.3 K257AT (Nucla & Naturita); 99.3 K257AU (Paonia); 101.3 K267AB (Gunnison)

Links
- Public license information: Public file; LMS
- Webcast: Listen Live
- Website: 94kix.com

KKXK (94.1 FM, 94 Kix Country) is a radio station broadcasting a country music format. Licensed to Montrose, Colorado, United States, the station is currently owned by Townsquare Media.

== History ==
The station went on the air as beautiful music station KUBC-FM in 1977. On August 5, 1981, the station changed its call sign to the current KKXK.

Previous logo
