= WOZI =

- Presque Isle, Maine; United States
- Broadcast area: Presque Isle, Maine; Caribou, Maine; Houlton, Maine
- Frequency: 101.9 MHz
- Branding: 101.9 The Rock

Programming
- Format: Classic rock
- Affiliations: Compass Media Networks; Boston Red Sox Radio Network; New England Patriots Radio Network

Ownership
- Owner: Townsquare Media; (Townsquare Media Presque Isle License, LLC)
- Sister stations: WBPW, WQHR

History
- First air date: 1980 (as WELF)
- Former call signs: WELF (1980–1981)

Technical information
- Licensing authority: FCC
- Facility ID: 41007
- Class: C2
- Power: 7,900 watts
- HAAT: 368 meters (1,207 ft)
- Transmitter coordinates: 46°32′51″N 67°48′35″W

Links
- Public license information: Public file; LMS
- Webcast: Listen Live
- Website: 1019therock.com

WOZI (101.9 FM, "The Rock") is a classic rock formatted broadcast radio station licensed to Presque Isle, Maine, United States, serving the Presque Isle/Caribou/Houlton area. WOZI is owned and operated by Townsquare Media.
