= KXDL =

- Browerville, Minnesota; United States
- Broadcast area: Long Prairie, Minnesota
- Frequency: 99.7 MHz
- Branding: Hot Rod Radio 99.7 FM

Programming
- Format: Oldies
- Affiliations: ABC Radio Classic Hits

Ownership
- Owner: Doug Frauenholtz; (D&K Distributors, Inc.)
- Sister stations: KEYL

History
- First air date: May 15, 1992

Technical information
- Licensing authority: FCC
- Facility ID: 53301
- Class: A
- ERP: 6,000 watts
- HAAT: 95 meters (312 feet)
- Transmitter coordinates: 46°03′12″N 94°50′46″W

Links
- Public license information: Public file; LMS
- Website: kxdlhotrodradio.com

KXDL (99.7 FM, "Hot Rod Radio") is a radio station licensed to serve Browerville, Minnesota, United States, with studios located in Long Prairie, Minnesota. The station is owned by Doug Frauenholtz, through licensee D&K Distributors, Inc.

KXDL broadcasts an oldies music format.

The station was assigned the KXDL call sign by the Federal Communications Commission on July 12, 1990.
