= KDHL =

- Faribault, Minnesota; United States
- Broadcast area: Minneapolis–Saint Paul; Owatonna; Mankato
- Frequency: 920 kHz
- Branding: The Mighty 920

Programming
- Format: Classic country
- Affiliations: ABC News Radio

Ownership
- Owner: Townsquare Media; (Townsquare License, LLC)
- Sister stations: KQCL, KRFO, KRFO-FM

History
- First air date: 1948

Technical information
- Licensing authority: FCC
- Facility ID: 54634
- Class: B
- Power: 3,300 watts day 1,000 watts night
- Transmitter coordinates: 44°15′47″N 93°16′29″W
- Translator: 97.9 K250CD (Faribault)

Links
- Public license information: Public file; LMS
- Webcast: Listen Live
- Website: kdhlradio.com

KDHL (920 AM) is a radio station broadcasting a classic country format. Licensed to Faribault, Minnesota, United States, the station is currently owned by Townsquare Media and features programming from ABC News Radio. The station features a blend of syndicated classic country music and heavy local programming directed at the community and the agricultural sector.

On August 30, 2013, a deal was announced in which Townsquare Media would acquire 53 stations from Cumulus Media, including KDHL, for $238 million. The deal was part of Cumulus' acquisition of Dial Global; Townsquare and Dial Global were both controlled by Oaktree Capital Management. The sale to Townsquare was completed on November 14, 2013.

Logo until translator sign on

== History ==
KDHL first signed on the air in 1948.

The station was founded by Palmer Dragsten, Herb Lee, and Jack Hyde, who aimed to make local programming and community service the station's focus from the start. One of the first community programs was a live church service broadcast from Trinity Lutheran Church in Faribault, which began in April 1948 and continues today.

In its early years, KDHL launched the career of notable Western music personality Johnny Western, who had a weekly show starting in August 1949 when he was 15 years old.

KDHL celebrated its 70th anniversary in 2018. The station is currently owned by Townsquare Media and operates alongside sister stations KQCL (95.9 FM), KRFO (1390 AM), and KRFO-FM (104.9 FM) in the Faribault-Owatonna market.

== Signal ==
KDHL broadcasts with a power of 3,300 watts during the day and 1,000 watts at night. The station is also rebroadcast on an FM translator, K250CD at 97.9 FM in Faribault.
