= KCHK (AM) =

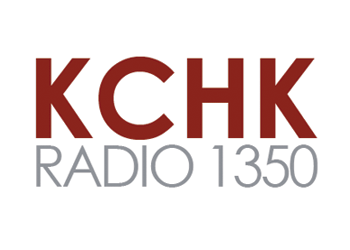
- New Prague, Minnesota; United States
- Frequency: 1350 kHz

Programming
- Format: Classic country; polka
- Affiliations: Townhall News; Minnesota Twins

Ownership
- Owner: Ingstad Brothers Broadcasting, LLC
- Sister stations: KCHK-FM

History
- First air date: 1970
- Former call signs: KTMF (1969–1977)

Technical information
- Licensing authority: FCC
- Facility ID: 34904
- Class: D
- Power: 500 watts day; 70 watts night
- Transmitter coordinates: 44°34′39″N 93°30′16″W
- Translator: 106.7 K294DF (New Prague)

Links
- Public license information: Public file; LMS
- Webcast: Listen live
- Website: kchkradio.net

KCHK (1350 kHz) is an AM radio station broadcasting a mixed format, including classic country music, but is best known for its polka programming. Licensed to New Prague, Minnesota, United States, the station is owned by Ingstad Brothers Broadcasting, LLC, and features programming from Townhall News.

The station is known for playing polka music for the Czechs (hence, the station's call letters KCHK) that settled the area starting in the mid-1850s.
