= WKLK-FM =

Radio station in Cloquet, Minnesota

- Cloquet, Minnesota; United States
- Broadcast area: Duluth-Superior
- Frequency: 96.5 MHz
- Branding: Legends Rock 96.5

Programming
- Format: Classic rock

Ownership
- Owner: Fond du Lac Band of Lake Superior Chippewa
- Sister stations: WMOZ, WKLK

History
- First air date: 1992
- Former call signs: KOUV (1991–1992, CP)

Technical information
- Licensing authority: FCC
- Facility ID: 53997
- Class: C3
- ERP: 36,000 watts
- HAAT: 96 m (315 ft)
- Transmitter coordinates: 46°44′58.00″N 92°25′17.00″W

Links
- Public license information: Public file; LMS
- Website: wklk-fm.com

WKLK-FM (96.5 MHz, "K-96.5") is a radio station broadcasting a classic rock music format. Licensed to Cloquet, Minnesota, United States, the station serves the Duluth, area. The station is owned by Fond du Lac Band of Lake Superior Chippewa.

== History ==
The WKLK-FM call sign had an earlier use in Cloquet before the present 96.5 MHz facility. Broadcast engineer and historian Scott Fybush described the present 96.5 MHz station as the "second incarnation" of WKLK-FM; the earlier WKLK-FM began on 100.9 MHz, was later upgraded and moved to 100.5 MHz, and was sold to Minnesota Public Radio, becoming WSCN.

The present station developed from WKLK Inc.'s effort to add a new commercial FM channel at Cloquet. In 1989, Broadcasting reported that Channel 243A, 96.5 MHz, had been allotted to Cloquet at the request of WKLK Inc. By 1991, FMedia! listed WKLK Radio's planned 96.5 MHz facility as 6,000 watts horizontal and vertical at 100 meters above average terrain, with WKLK Radio located at 15 South Tenth Street in Cloquet.

The station first operated as KOUV in the early 1990s. A 2012 Fond du Lac newspaper account of the station's sale reported that FM 96.5 "originally went on the air as KOUV" and changed call letters to WKLK in February 1992, when Alan Quarnstrom bought the station. Contemporary trade listings show the WKLK AM-FM combination being assigned from WKLK Inc. to a company headed by Quarnstrom for $200,000. The FM facility was listed as 96.5 MHz with 6,000 watts at 100 meters, and the FCC granted the assignment on May 12, 1992.

By the late 1990s and early 2000s, WKLK-FM was operating as a music station for the Cloquet and Duluth market. In February 2000, NorthPine reported that WKLK-FM had dropped ABC's Oldies Radio format for ABC's Hot AC format, using the slogan "K96.5" and the positioner "Today's Best Music". The M Street Journal also described WKLK-FM around that time as moving from oldies to adult contemporary network programming. By the 2006–07 ratings period, trade reporting listed WKLK-FM as a classic rock station under Quarnstrom ownership.

In 2012, the Fond du Lac Band of Lake Superior Chippewa purchased WKLK-FM, WKLK 1230 AM, and WMOZ 106.9 FM from QB Broadcasting. The FCC granted the voluntary assignment of WKLK-FM's license from QB Broadcasting Ltd. to the Fond du Lac Band on June 22, 2012. Fond du Lac's own reporting stated that the purchase became official on September 1, 2012, and that the Band planned to keep the stations commercial while making no major immediate programming changes. At the time, WKLK-FM was described as a classic rock station, WKLK AM as a nostalgia station, and WMOZ as an oldies station, with a mix of local and satellite programming. A later Fond du Lac economic development report also noted that the Band signed an asset purchase agreement for the stations in April 2012 and completed the transfer on September 1, 2012.

After the Fond du Lac purchase, WKLK-FM received a power increase. In 2013, Fond du Lac's newspaper reported that the FCC had approved an upgrade from 25,000 watts to 36,000 watts while retaining the station's existing transmitter site and 96-meter antenna height. The upgrade was expected to slightly improve the station's signal into Duluth, where terrain and other signal issues limited reception. In 2014, NorthPine reported that WKLK-FM was operating at reduced power because of a main transmitter failure, while also noting the station's separate construction permit to upgrade to 36,000 watts. NorthPine reported in April 2016 that the upgrade from 25,000 watts to 36,000 watts had been completed, with the station remaining at 96 meters HAAT from its tower near Cloquet. FCC Broadcast Actions show that the license to cover for WKLK-FM's upgraded facility was granted in April 2016.

WKLK-FM is currently licensed to Cloquet on 96.5 MHz, channel 243, as facility ID 53997. NorthPine lists the station as a 36,000-watt class C2 classic rock outlet branded "K96.5", owned by the Fond du Lac Band of Lake Superior Chippewa. The station is also marketed as "Legends Rock" and operates as part of the Fond du Lac Band's radio group with WKLK 1230 AM and WMOZ 106.9 FM.
