= KRCH =

Coordinates: 44.116°N 92.690°W

- Rochester, Minnesota; United States
- Broadcast area: Rochester, Minnesota
- Frequency: 101.7 MHz
- Branding: Laser 101.7

Programming
- Format: Classic rock
- Affiliations: Westwood One; Minnesota Vikings; Minnesota Wild

Ownership
- Owner: iHeartMedia; (iHM Licenses, LLC)
- Sister stations: KFAN, KMFX-FM

History
- First air date: 1996; 30 years ago
- Call sign meaning: RoCHester

Technical information
- Licensing authority: FCC
- Facility ID: 35527
- Class: C2
- ERP: 39,000 watts
- HAAT: 169 m (554 ft)

Links
- Public license information: Public file; LMS
- Webcast: Listen Live
- Website: laser1017.iheart.com

KRCH (101.7 FM "Laser 101.7") is a radio station owned by iHeartMedia (formerly Clear Channel Communications) which broadcasts from Rochester, Minnesota. It has a classic rock format.

== "Laser 101.7" Morning Show (1993–1999) ==
Prior to broadcasting the syndicated Bob and Tom Show on weekday mornings, KRCH aired a locally produced morning show hosted by Matt and Homey.
