= KQCL =

- Faribault, Minnesota; United States
- Broadcast area: Lakeville, Minnesota; Northfield, Minnesota; Owatonna, Minnesota
- Frequency: 95.9 MHz
- Branding: Power 96

Programming
- Format: Classic rock
- Affiliations: Compass Media Networks

Ownership
- Owner: Townsquare Media; (Townsquare License, LLC)
- Sister stations: KDHL, KRFO, KRFO-FM

History
- First air date: January 10, 1968 (as KDHL-FM)
- Former call signs: KDHL-FM (1968–1987); KOFN (1987–1988)

Technical information
- Licensing authority: FCC
- Facility ID: 54628
- Class: A
- ERP: 6,000 watts
- HAAT: 100 meters (330 ft)
- Transmitter coordinates: 44°21′25.00″N 93°11′31.00″W

Links
- Public license information: Public file; LMS
- Webcast: Listen Live
- Website: power96radio.com

KQCL (95.9 FM, "Classic Rock Power 96") is a radio station broadcasting a classic rock music format. Licensed to Faribault, Minnesota, United States, the station is currently owned by Townsquare Media.

== History ==
The station began as KDHL-FM. In May 1967, the Federal Communications Commission granted KDHL Broadcasting Co. of Faribault the KDHL-FM call sign for a new FM station. Before the station was fully licensed, the Broadcast Bureau granted a modification of construction permit in February 1968 to change the transmitter type, antenna type, and antenna height to 280 feet. The Broadcast Bureau granted a license covering KDHL-FM as a new station on July 10, 1968. That same year, KDHL-FM also received authorization for a 67 kHz SCA subcarrier.

As KDHL-FM, the station was associated with the KDHL operation in Faribault. The 1983 FM Atlas listed KDHL-FM on 95.9 MHz in Faribault with a country format. The station made several facility-related filings during the late 1970s and mid-1980s. In 1977, KDHL-FM sought a construction permit to change its city of license to Faribault-Northfield, relocate the transmitter, change antenna type, and increase antenna height. In 1985, the station sought modifications involving transmitter location, 3 kW ERP, 328-foot HAAT, and antenna-system changes. One such application was returned by the FCC in February 1986.

The KDHL-FM call sign was changed to KOFN in 1987; Radio & Records reported the KDHL-FM-to-KOFN call-letter change with a September 1 date. As KOFN, the station filed in 1988 to make facility changes with an 810-watt, 173-meter HAAT operation from a site south of Faribault.

In late 1988, the station received the KQCL call sign. Broadcasting listed KQCL among existing-FM call-letter grants in its November 7, 1988 issue, with KOFN, Radio Ingstad Minnesota Inc., Faribault, Minnesota, identified in the same call-letter listing. Popular Communications later listed KQCL, Faribault, on 95.9 MHz as having previously been KOFN. By 1989, FMedia! reported KQCL as "Power 96", noting that the station had warmed up from its previous "Cool 96" identity.

During the early 1990s, KQCL was appearing in national music-trade reporting. In April 1991, The Gavin Report listed KQCL in Faribault among stations reporting activity on Marc Cohn's "Walking in Memphis"; music director Grover Collins was quoted as saying the song was doing well with adults 25-plus.

In 1998, The M Street Journal reported that Form 314 transfer applications had been filed from Radio Iowa Broadcasting, Inc. to Cumulus Licensing Corp. for several Minnesota stations, including KDHL and KQCL in Faribault. A 2000 M Street Journal item later referred to KDHL and KQCL as stations Cumulus had previously bought from Jim Ingstad.

KQCL remained part of the Cumulus group into the early 2010s. In 2011, the FCC's order approving the Cumulus-Citadel transfer of control listed KQCL(FM), Faribault, Minnesota, Facility ID 54628, among the affected Cumulus stations. In August 2013, Townsquare Media announced a multi-market transaction with Cumulus Media and Peak II Holding LLC; the company said it would acquire 53 Cumulus stations in 12 markets, including the Faribault-Owatonna market. Northpine reported that the Faribault-Owatonna stations going to Townsquare included KDHL, KRFO, KQCL, and KRFO-FM. Jones Day, which represented Cumulus, described the transaction as a $238 million sale of 53 radio stations in 12 small and mid-sized markets to Townsquare Media, plus a station swap involving Fresno, California.

In 2021, KQCL upgraded from 3 kW to 6 kW. Northpine reported that Townsquare Media's KQCL/95.9 in Faribault and Lakes Broadcasting's WLKX/95.9 in Forest Lake had received construction permits to upgrade from 3 kW to 6 kW, the maximum for their Class A licenses, and later reported that both upgrades had been completed. FCCInfo lists KQCL as a licensed Class A facility on 95.9 MHz with 6 kW ERP, 100 meters HAAT, and Facility ID 54628.

KQCL continues to operate as "Power 96" with a classic rock format. The station's official website identifies Power 96 as a Townsquare Media station playing classic rock for Faribault-Owatonna, Minnesota, and the Owatonna Area Chamber of Commerce lists Power96 KQCL among Townsquare's local radio brands with a classic rock format.
