= KFAN (AM) =

Sports radio station in Rochester, Minnesota

- Rochester, Minnesota; United States
- Frequency: 1270 kHz
- Branding: KFAN AM 1270, The FAN

Programming
- Format: Sports
- Affiliations: FAN Radio Network; Fox Sports Radio; Minnesota Timberwolves

Ownership
- Owner: iHeartMedia; (iHM Licenses, LLC)
- Sister stations: KMFX-FM, KRCH

History
- First air date: 1957 (as KWEB)
- Former call signs: KWEB (1957–2011); KTCN (2011)
- Call sign meaning: The Fan

Technical information
- Licensing authority: FCC
- Facility ID: 35526
- Class: B
- Power: 5,000 watts day; 1,000 watts night
- Transmitter coordinates: 43°58′47″N 92°26′51″W
- Translator: 93.5 K228FY (Rochester)

Links
- Public license information: Public file; LMS
- Website: mykfan.iheart.com

KFAN (1270 kHz) is an AM radio station licensed to Rochester, Minnesota. The station owned by iHeartMedia, and rebroadcasts sister KFXN-FM in Minneapolis/St. Paul as part of the regional FAN Radio Network.

The station was, for many years, KWEB. In August 2011, Clear Channel parked the KTCN call sign on the frequency for several days, in anticipation of a format and station flip in the Twin Cities market. When KFAN (1130 AM) moved to 100.3 FM and adopted the KFXN-FM call sign, Clear Channel parked the KFAN call sign on 1270 AM in the Rochester market.
