= KUXX =

Coordinates: 43°36′54″N 94°57′48″W

- Jackson, Minnesota; United States
- Broadcast area: Fairmont, Minnesota; Windom, Minnesota; Estherville, Iowa; Spirit Lake, Iowa
- Frequency: 105.7 MHz
- Branding: Xtreme Country

Programming
- Format: Country music

Ownership
- Owner: Dakota Broadcasting, LLC; (Community First Broadcasting, LLC)
- Sister stations: KKOJ

History
- First air date: April 25, 1994
- Former call signs: KRAQ (1989–2015)

Technical information
- Licensing authority: FCC
- Facility ID: 35057
- Class: C3
- ERP: 25,000 watts
- HAAT: 100 meters (330 ft)

Links
- Public license information: Public file; LMS
- Website: country1057.com

KUXX (105.7 FM) is a radio station licensed to Jackson, Minnesota. The station broadcasts a country music format and is licensed to Community First Broadcasting, LLC.

The station originally signed on the air on April 25, 1994, under the call sign KRAQ. It began as a construction permit in 1989, receiving its license to cover in 1994. During this time, it was owned by Kleven Broadcasting and established itself as a "Classic Hits" outlet.

In late 2015, Kleven Broadcasting sold KRAQ and its sister AM station, KKOJ, to Community First Broadcasting, LLC for $735,000. On January 4, 2016, a frequency and format swap occurred. The classic hits format that had long been on 105.7 FM was moved to its sister station, KKOJ (and its associated FM translator). Simultaneously, the 105.7 FM frequency adopted the KUXX call letters and launched a modern country format branded as "Xtreme Country 105.7."

Under Community First Broadcasting, the station began to add coverage of the Iowa Great Lakes region, despite being licensed to Jackson (which is near the Iowa border).
