= KMFX-FM =

Country music radio station in Minnesota, US

Coordinates: 44.279°N 92.394°W

- Lake City, Minnesota; United States
- Broadcast area: Rochester, Minnesota
- Frequency: 102.5 MHz
- Branding: 102.5 The Fox

Programming
- Format: Country
- Affiliations: Premiere Networks

Ownership
- Owner: iHeartMedia, Inc.; (iHM Licenses, LLC)
- Sister stations: KFAN, KRCH

History
- First air date: December 14, 1991; 34 years ago
- Former call signs: KQLW (1991–1993)
- Call sign meaning: "Minnesota Fox"

Technical information
- Licensing authority: FCC
- Facility ID: 54635
- Class: C3
- ERP: 9,400 watts
- HAAT: 161 m (528 ft)

Links
- Public license information: Public file; LMS
- Webcast: Listen Live
- Website: 1025thefox.iheart.com

KMFX-FM (102.5 MHz "102.5 The Fox") is a radio station in Rochester, Minnesota, airing a country music format. The station is owned by iHeartMedia, Inc.

From 1994 to 2008, KMFX-FM was simulcast on KMFX (1190 AM) in Wabasha; the AM station was sold in 2011 and now carries a separate country format as WPVW.
