= WKLK (AM) =

Radio station in Cloquet, Minnesota

- Cloquet, Minnesota; United States
- Broadcast area: Duluth area
- Frequency: 1230 kHz
- Branding: WKLK 1230 AM

Programming
- Format: Adult standards
- Affiliations: AP News

Ownership
- Owner: Fond du Lac Band of Lake Superior Chippewa
- Sister stations: WKLK-FM, WMOZ

History
- First air date: January 31, 1950
- Call sign meaning: W-KL(CL)oK(Q)uet

Technical information
- Licensing authority: FCC
- Facility ID: 53998
- Class: C
- Power: 720 watts unlimited
- Transmitter coordinates: 46°44′58.00″N 92°25′17.00″W

Links
- Public license information: Public file; LMS
- Website: wklk1230.com

WKLK (1230 kHz) is an AM radio station broadcasting an adult standards/nostalgia format. Licensed to Cloquet, Minnesota, United States, the station serves the Duluth area. The station is owned by the Fond du Lac Band of Lake Superior Chippewa, and features programming from AP News.

WKLK currently broadcasts an adult standards and nostalgia format, branded as "America's Best Music". The station’s programming features long-running specialty segments such as the International Polka Party, which has been on the air for over 75 years, and WKLK Radio Classics, a Sunday night program dedicated to "Theater of the Mind" broadcasts from the Golden Age of Radio.

== History ==
The station first began broadcasting on January 31, 1950, serving as a local voice for Carlton County. The station was founded by Harry Newby, Sr., who established the original studios on Highway 33 South. Its call letters were chosen as a phonetic abbreviation for its city of license: W-KL(CL)oK(Q)uet. Over the decades, the station's physical presence in Cloquet moved from a former bottling factory to its long-time home at 807 Cloquet Avenue, before eventually settling at its current address at 1104 Cloquet Avenue.

After the Newby era, the station passed through several hands, including ownership by Otto Korp and later a broadcast group based in Newton, Iowa. In 1992, the station was acquired by Al Quarnstrom, who modernized the facility's operations. The station and its sister signals were eventually purchased by the Fond du Lac Band of Lake Superior Chippewa.. This acquisition made WKLK part of one of the few tribal-owned commercial radio clusters in the United States.
