= KRPR =

Coordinates: 44.041°N 92.340°W

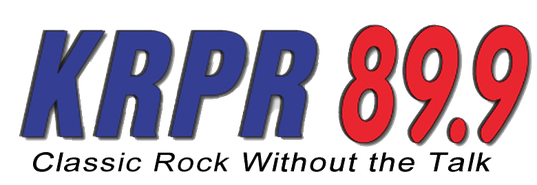
- Rochester, Minnesota; United States
- Broadcast area: Rochester, Minnesota
- Frequency: 89.9 MHz
- Branding: 89.9 KRPR

Programming
- Format: Classic rock
- Affiliations: AMPERS

Ownership
- Owner: Rochester Public Radio

History
- First air date: 1975
- Call sign meaning: Rochester Public Radio

Technical information
- Licensing authority: FCC
- Facility ID: 57277
- Class: C3
- ERP: 3,200 watts
- HAAT: 180 m (591 ft)

Links
- Public license information: Public file; LMS
- Webcast: Listen live
- Website: www.krpr.org

KRPR (89.9 FM) is a non-commercial radio station licensed by the Federal Communications Commission (FCC) to serve the community of Rochester, Minnesota. It is the only locally owned and programmed station in the city.

The studios are located at 2630 (Suite 500) South Broadway in Rochester, Minnesota. The station broadcasts from a transmitter site East of the city and plays an expansive variety of classic rock. Being a non-commercial station, KRPR presents brief underwriting messages produced by station personalities rather than commercials.

KRPR is a member of AMPERS, The Association of Minnesota Public Educational Radio Stations.

== News segments ==
World news headlines are provided and updated by Feature Story News. Local and regional news reports are provided by KIMT-TV.

== Sound quality ==
KRPR uses a minimal amount of dynamic range compression combined with audiophile quality signal processing as well as no data compression to achieve its full fidelity sound.

== History ==
KRPR began broadcasting in 1975 under the ownership of Rochester Community and Technical College where it was located. In the 1980s the station broadcast a New Wave (now often referred to as 1980s music), punk rock and hard rock format. Live listener call in request shows often featured local Minnesota bands such as The Suburbs, Hüsker Dü, The Phones, Chameleon, Slave Raider, Prince, The Time, and The Replacements. The airways of the station were staffed students and teachers of the college during this time. Bright orange and black KRPR bumper stickers and T-shirts were a common sight throughout Southern Minnesota during this era of the radio station as fans displayed their support.

In the late 1990s the station (now broadcasting a classic rock and album oriented rock format) was sold to Rochester Public Radio, the current operator and licensee. The station currently thrives in a market that supports several Classic Rock stations, due to its lack of lengthy ads and wide variety of deep tracks offered over the airwaves. An interactive website is also available for listeners to view tracks that have aired and submit song requests.
