= KNLW-LP =

- Rochester, Minnesota; United States
- Frequency: 98.9 MHz

Ownership
- Owner: Mercy Hill Church

History
- First air date: 2007

Technical information
- Licensing authority: FCC
- Facility ID: 126358
- Class: L1
- ERP: 75 watts
- HAAT: 34.7 m (114 ft)
- Transmitter coordinates: 44°5′30.00″N 92°31′3.00″W

Links
- Public license information: LMS

KNLW-LP (98.9 FM) is a radio station licensed to Rochester, Minnesota, United States. The station is currently owned by Mercy Hill Church.
