= KSNN =

- Ridgway, Colorado; United States
- Broadcast area: Montrose, Colorado
- Frequency: 103.7 MHz
- Branding: 103.7 The River

Programming
- Format: Contemporary hit radio
- Affiliations: Compass Media Networks; Westwood One

Ownership
- Owner: Townsquare Media; (Townsquare License, LLC)
- Sister stations: KKXK, KUBC

History
- First air date: 2002
- Former call signs: KBNG (1999–2012)
- Call sign meaning: "Sunny" (former branding)

Technical information
- Licensing authority: FCC
- Facility ID: 89280
- Class: C2
- ERP: 4,100 watts
- HAAT: 480 meters (1,570 ft)
- Transmitter coordinates: 38°23′15″N 107°40′31″W

Links
- Public license information: Public file; LMS
- Webcast: Listen live
- Website: 1037theriver.com

KSNN (103.7 FM, "103.7 The River") is a radio station licensed to Ridgway, Colorado, United States, and serving Ridgeway, Montrose and Delta. The station, established in 2002, is currently owned by Townsquare Media and the license is held by Townsquare License, LLC. KSNN broadcasts a contemporary hit radio music format.

== History ==
This station received its original construction permit from the Federal Communications Commission on March 24, 1999. The new station was assigned the KBNG call sign by the FCC on May 10, 1999. KBNG received its license to cover from the FCC on August 19, 2002.

In December 2002, Idaho Broadcasting Consortium, Inc., reached an agreement to sell this station to the Woodland Communications Corporation for $300,000. The deal was approved by the FCC on January 23, 2003, and the transaction was consummated on March 11, 2003.

In July 2004, Woodland Communications Corporation reached an agreement to sell this station to Cherry Creek Radio through their CCR-Montrose IV, LLC, subsidiary as part of a three-station deal valued at a reported $2.65 million. The deal was approved by the FCC on August 19, 2004, and the transaction was consummated on October 5, 2004.

On May 16, 2012, the station changed its call sign to the current KSNN. On May 17, 2012, KSNN changed its format to soft AC, branded as "Sunny 103". In July 2018, the station changed its format to CHR and rebranded as "103.7 The River".

Effective June 17, 2022, Cherry Creek Radio sold KSNN as part of a 42 station/21 translator package to Townsquare Media for $18.75 million.
