= KRFO-FM =

- Owatonna, Minnesota; United States
- Frequency: 104.9 MHz
- Branding: KAT Kountry 105

Programming
- Format: Country
- Affiliations: Compass Media Networks

Ownership
- Owner: Townsquare Media; (Townsquare License, LLC)
- Sister stations: KDHL, KRFO, KQCL

History
- First air date: December 29, 1966
- Call sign meaning: Radio From Owatonna

Technical information
- Licensing authority: FCC
- Facility ID: 30125
- Class: A
- ERP: 4,700 watts
- HAAT: 53 meters (174 ft)
- Transmitter coordinates: 44°04′26″N 93°10′49″W

Links
- Public license information: Public file; LMS
- Webcast: Listen live
- Website: katkountry105.com

KRFO-FM (104.9 MHz) is a radio station airing a country music format, licensed to Owatonna, Minnesota. KRFO-FM is owned by Townsquare Media.

== History ==
KRFO-FM has long operated as the FM companion to KRFO (1390 AM) in Owatonna. The AM station was part of a postwar expansion of Minnesota radio; a Minnesota Broadcasters Association historical directory lists KRFO, Owatonna, among the stations added in Minnesota in 1950.

KRFO-FM was operating on 104.9 MHz by 1967. The 1967 edition of SAMS Stereo FM listed KRFO-FM at 104.9 MHz with 2,900 watts and an antenna height of 175 feet.

By the late 1980s, KRFO-AM-FM was owned by Owatonna Broadcasting Co. In 1989, Broadcasting reported that Owatonna Broadcasting had sold the stations to Ingstad Broadcasting Inc. for $1,054,551. The sale report described KRFO-FM as operating on 104.9 MHz with 3,000 watts and an antenna 175 feet above average terrain. FCC application records show the station's 1989 assignment application was granted on August 10, 1989.

In 1991, KRFO-FM received a facility upgrade. Broadcasting reported that the FCC granted a modification of license for KRFO-FM on September 12, 1991, increasing the station's effective radiated power to 4.7 kW horizontal and vertical. FCC-derived facility records continue to list KRFO-FM as a Class A station on 104.9 MHz, licensed to Owatonna with 4.7 kW ERP and 53 meters HAAT.

The station was airing a country format by at least the early 1990s. KRFO-FM was included in the 1993–94 Country Music Association country radio station list.

In 1998, Cumulus Media LLC acquired KRFO-AM-FM as part of a larger purchase of stations from James D. Ingstad. Broadcasting & Cable reported that the transaction included KRFO-AM-FM in Owatonna and had a total value of $42.5 million.

KRFO-FM later became part of Townsquare Media. In August 2013, Northpine reported that Townsquare would take over Cumulus stations in several Iowa and Minnesota markets, including the Faribault-Owatonna group consisting of KDHL, KRFO, KQCL, and KRFO-FM. The station now operates as a country outlet branded "Kat Kountry 105".
