= KCHK-FM =

- New Prague, Minnesota; United States
- Broadcast area: Southern Twin Cities suburbs; Faribault
- Frequency: 95.5 MHz

Programming
- Format: Classic country; polka; oldies
- Affiliations: Townhall News

Ownership
- Owner: Ingstad Brothers Broadcasting, LLC
- Sister stations: KCHK

History
- First air date: 1991
- Former call signs: KCHK-FM (1988–2002); KRDS-FM (2002–2013)

Technical information
- Licensing authority: FCC
- Facility ID: 34906
- Class: A
- ERP: 6,000 watts
- HAAT: 100 meters (330 ft)
- Transmitter coordinates: 44°27′40″N 93°35′8″W

Links
- Public license information: Public file; LMS
- Webcast: Listen live
- Website: kchkradio.net

KCHK-FM (95.5 MHz) is a radio station broadcasting a classic country, polka, and oldies format. Licensed to New Prague, Minnesota, United States, the station is owned by Ingstad Brothers Broadcasting, LLC and features programming from Townhall News.

== History ==
=== Establishment and early programming ===
KCHK-FM was developed during the late 1980s as an FM companion to the existing KCHK (1350 AM). The KCHK-FM call sign was sought for the proposed station in January 1988. The station remained under construction for several years; applications filed in 1989 and 1990 sought changes to the transmitter site specified in its construction permit.

KCHK-FM began broadcasting in early 1991. Contemporary industry publications offered differing classifications of its initial programming. The M Street Journal listed the new station as an adult contemporary simulcast of KCHK, while FMedia! described a mixture of country music and rock-and-roll oldies, with polka programming occupying much of Sunday.

By February 1997, KCHK-FM had added the ABC/SMN syndicated oldies service then known as Pure Gold. KCHK continued to carry polkas, waltzes and other old-time music alongside the oldies format, and the AM station generally rebroadcast the FM service.

=== Sale and KRDS-FM ===
In October 2001, Kingsley Murphy Jr.'s Northland Broadcasting agreed to sell KCHK and KCHK-FM to Radio Southern Minnesota for $900,000. Radio Southern Minnesota was owned 51 percent by James Ingstad and 49 percent by James Lowe. At the time of the transaction, Broadcasting & Cable identified KCHK-FM as a 3,000-watt oldies station and the AM outlet as a country station. The license assignment from Northland Radio to Radio Southern Minnesota was subsequently filed with the Federal Communications Commission (FCC).

The FCC assigned the call sign KRDS-FM to 95.5 MHz on July 11, 2002. The station initially retained ABC's Oldies Radio format and began identifying its service area as "New Prague–Northfield". In December 2002, KRDS-FM discontinued the syndicated service and introduced a locally produced oldies format spanning music from the 1950s through the early 1980s. Branded as "Maxx 95.5", the format originated from studios in both New Prague and Northfield.

In 2002, KRDS-FM and KNOF at 95.3 MHz in Saint Paul reached an agreement allowing both short-spaced stations to seek power increases from 3,000 to 6,000 watts. The FCC granted KRDS-FM's license-to-cover application in February 2006. The authorization listed Ingstad Brothers Broadcasting, LLC, as the licensee.

=== Return to KCHK-FM ===
On November 23, 2012, KRDS-FM ended its longstanding oldies format and began simulcasting KCHK's “Vintage Country” programming. The combined service retained the stations' polka programming. The FCC restored the KCHK-FM call sign on April 3, 2013.

A 2018 profile by SW News Media reported that Tom Goetzinger, who had previously worked at the station, returned as station manager in 2012. Under Goetzinger, polka music again became a central part of the programming, accompanied by vintage country and rock-and-roll oldies. As of 2024, the station described its music programming as a mixture of polka, vintage country and 1950s–1960s rock and roll. It also carried local news, weather and sports, along with locally produced programs including Trading Post, Tom's Tidbits and Live Musicians Friday.
