= KFNL-FM =

Classic hits radio station in Spring Valley–Rochester, Minnesota

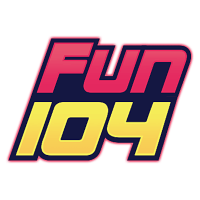
- Spring Valley, Minnesota; United States
- Broadcast area: Rochester, Minnesota
- Frequency: 104.3 MHz
- Branding: Fun 104

Programming
- Format: Classic hits
- Affiliations: Compass Media Networks

Ownership
- Owner: Townsquare Media; (Townsquare License, LLC)
- Sister stations: KDCZ; KDOC-FM; KFIL; KFIL-FM; KROC; KROC-FM; KWWK; KYBA

History
- First air date: 1994 (as KNFX-FM)
- Former call signs: KVNG (1991–1993, CP); KNFX (1993–1994); KNFX-FM (1994–1996); KVGO (1996–1998); KQOL (1998–1999); KVGO (1999–2019)
- Call sign meaning: "Fun"

Technical information
- Licensing authority: FCC
- Facility ID: 54631
- Class: C3
- ERP: 10,000 watts
- HAAT: 156 m (512 ft)
- Transmitter coordinates: 43°38′23″N 92°38′30″W
- Repeater: 103.9 KDOC-FM (Eyota)

Links
- Public license information: Public file; LMS
- Webcast: Listen live
- Website: fun1043.com

KFNL-FM (104.3 MHz, "Fun 104") is a radio station licensed to Spring Valley, Minnesota, serving the Rochester, Minnesota, area. KFNL-FM airs a classic hits format and is owned by Townsquare Media, through licensee Townsquare License, LLC.

On September 26, 2019, after three days of stunting, KVGO shifted their format from oldies (as "Cool 104") to classic hits, branded as "Fun 104.3". On October 3, 2019, KVGO changed call letters to KFNL-FM.
