= KRFO (AM) =

- Owatonna, Minnesota; United States
- Frequency: 1390 kHz
- Branding: KRFO AM 1390/94.7 FM

Programming
- Format: Classic hits

Ownership
- Owner: Townsquare Media; (Townsquare License, LLC)
- Sister stations: KDHL, KRFO-FM, KQCL

History
- First air date: 1950
- Former call signs: KOBK (1950–1956)
- Call sign meaning: Radio From Owatonna

Technical information
- Licensing authority: FCC
- Facility ID: 30121
- Class: D
- Power: 500 watts day; 94 watts night
- Transmitter coordinates: 44°04′29″N 93°10′46″W
- Translator: 94.7 K234DB (Owatonna)

Links
- Public license information: Public file; LMS
- Webcast: Listen live
- Website: www.krforadio.com

KRFO (1390 AM) is a classic hits music formatted radio station in Owatonna, Minnesota. The station is owned by Townsquare Media. Its programming is also carried on FM translator K234DB (94.7).

== History ==
The station was first licensed on December 18, 1950, as KOBK. The call sign was changed to KRFO on May 1, 1956.

On August 30, 2013, a deal was announced in which Townsquare Media would acquire 53 Cumulus Media stations, including KRFO, for $238 million. The deal was part of Cumulus' acquisition of Dial Global; Townsquare and Dial Global were both controlled by Oaktree Capital Management. The sale to Townsquare was completed on November 14, 2013.

On April 4, 2021, KRFO's FM translator K234DB (94.7 FM) signed on the air and began simulcasting KRFO with a total of 250 watts.
