= KROC (AM) =

- Rochester, Minnesota; United States
- Broadcast area: Rochester, Minnesota
- Frequency: 1340 kHz
- Branding: News Talk 1340 KROC

Programming
- Format: News/talk
- Affiliations: ABC News Radio; Compass Media Networks; Premiere Networks; Salem Radio Network; Westwood One; Minnesota Twins

Ownership
- Owner: Townsquare Media; (Townsquare License, LLC)
- Sister stations: KDCZ; KDOC-FM; KFIL; KFIL-FM; KFNL-FM; KROC-FM; KWWK; KYBA

History
- First air date: September 30, 1935
- Former frequencies: 1310 kHz
- Call sign meaning: Rochester

Technical information
- Licensing authority: FCC
- Facility ID: 61321
- Class: C
- Power: 1,000 watts unlimited
- Transmitter coordinates: 44°01′47″N 92°29′31″W
- Translator: 96.9 K245CX (Rochester)

Links
- Public license information: Public file; LMS
- Webcast: Listen live
- Website: www.krocnews.com

KROC (1340 kHz) is an American news/talk AM radio station located in Rochester, Minnesota. The station was organized in 1934 by Gregory Gentling as the Southern Minnesota Broadcasting Company. The station went on the air on September 30, 1935. Gentling's other accomplishments included co-founding the Wm McCoy American Legion Post in 1919, originated Soldier's Field Park in 1926, co-owned The Rochester Daily Bulletin, helped arrange the 1934 visit to Rochester by President Franklin D Roosevelt, and managed several political campaigns during the 1920s, including Allen Furlow for Congress, and Arthur E. Nelson for Senate. KROC broadcasts many nationally syndicated talk shows as well as several shows with local personalities.

On August 30, 2013, a deal was announced in which Townsquare Media would acquire 53 stations from Cumulus Media, including KROC, for $238 million. The deal was part of Cumulus' acquisition of Dial Global; Townsquare and Dial Global were both controlled by Oaktree Capital Management. The sale to Townsquare was completed on November 14, 2013.

== Programming ==
The KROC air staff includes Rich Peterson, Andy Brownell, Tracy McCray, and Kim David. Local weekday programming includes Rochester's Good Morning with Rich Peterson, Rochester Today with Andy Brownell, Broad Talk with Tracy McCray, The Noon Report, and a talk show hosted by Andy Brownell. Syndicated weekday programming on KROC includes Coast to Coast AM with George Noory, America in the Morning with Jim Bohannon, Garage Logic with Joe Soucheray, and talk shows hosted by Chris Plante, Dave Ramsey, Sean Hannity, and Jim Bohannon.

Weekend programming includes Coast to Coast Weekend, On the House with the Carey Brothers, Medical Edge Weekend with Doctors Tom Shives and Jess Dhaliwal, Saturday Sports Talk with Joe Soucheray & Patrick Reusse, The Kim Komando Show with Kim Komando, The Dave Ramsey Show, Info Trak, Access Minnesota, World News This Week and Perspectives from ABC News Radio, Sports Huddle with Sid Hartman and Dave Mona, The Clark Howard Show, Meet the Press, plus "best of" talk shows hosted by Sean Hannity and Dave Ramsey.
