= KYBA =

Coordinates: 43.673°N 92.699°W

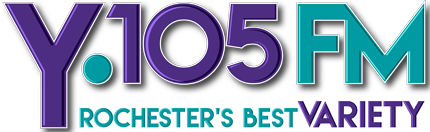
- Stewartville, Minnesota; United States
- Broadcast area: Rochester, Minnesota
- Frequency: 105.3 MHz
- Branding: Y105 FM

Programming
- Format: Adult contemporary
- Affiliations: Premiere Networks; Westwood One

Ownership
- Owner: Townsquare Media; (Townsquare License, LLC)
- Sister stations: KDCZ; KDOC-FM; KFIL; KFIL-FM; KFNL-FM; KROC; KROC-FM; KWWK

History
- First air date: February 1, 1993

Technical information
- Licensing authority: FCC
- Facility ID: 67336
- Class: C1
- ERP: 50,000 watts
- HAAT: 150 m (492 ft)
- Translator: 104.9 K285EL (Rochester)

Links
- Public license information: Public file; LMS
- Webcast: Listen live
- Website: y105fm.com

KYBA (105.3 FM, "Y105 FM") is a radio station licensed to Stewartville, Minnesota, and located in Rochester, Minnesota. The station airs an adult contemporary format. It is under ownership of Townsquare Media.

It is also heard on broadcast translator K285EL 104.9 FM in Rochester.

Between mid-November and Christmas, KYBA flips to an all-Christmas music format.

On August 30, 2013, a deal was announced in which Townsquare would acquire 53 Cumulus Media stations, including KYBA, for $238 million. The deal was part of Cumulus' acquisition of Dial Global; Townsquare and Dial Global were both controlled by Oaktree Capital Management. The sale to Townsquare was completed on November 14, 2013.
