= KROC-FM =

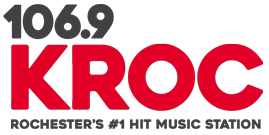
- Rochester, Minnesota; United States
- Broadcast area: Rochester-Austin-Albert Lea-Mason City-La Crosse
- Frequency: 106.9 MHz
- Branding: 106.9 KROC

Programming
- Language: English
- Format: Top 40 (CHR)
- Affiliations: Compass Media Networks; Westwood One

Ownership
- Owner: Townsquare Media; (Townsquare License, LLC)
- Sister stations: KDCZ; KDOC-FM; KFIL; KFIL-FM; KFNL-FM; KROC; KWWK; KYBA

History
- First air date: 1965
- Call sign meaning: Rochester

Technical information
- Licensing authority: FCC
- Facility ID: 61323
- Class: C0
- ERP: 100,000 watts
- HAAT: 338 m (1,109 ft)
- Transmitter coordinates: 43°34′15″N 92°25′37″W
- Translator: 106.5 K293CV (Rochester)

Links
- Public license information: Public file; LMS
- Webcast: Listen live
- Website: kroc.com

KROC-FM (106.9 MHz) is a commercial radio station serving Rochester, Minnesota. The station's transmitter is located near the Minnesota-Iowa border. The station is owned by Townsquare Media. It airs a top 40 (CHR) music format.

== History ==
The station was owned by the Southern Minnesota Broadcasting Company, along with other properties in the area, but they were sold to Cumulus Media in December 2003. KROC-FM went on-the-air at 106.9 MHz in 1965 with an easy listening and classical music. In 1967, the hybrid format was dropped, and the FM began simulcasting with KROC (1340 AM) until 1977, then changed to an automated MOR format called The Great Entertainers. On April 2, 1979, KROC-FM flipped to a highly successful Top 40/CHR format, under the FM 107 KROC moniker. In the 1950s, the owners launched a television station (KROC-TV), though that is now operated separately by Gray Television as KTTC.

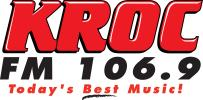
Longtime KROC-FM logo used from early 2006 until late 2016.

On August 30, 2013, a deal was announced in which Townsquare Media would acquire 53 Cumulus stations, including KROC-FM, for $238 million. The deal was part of Cumulus' acquisition of Dial Global; Townsquare and Dial Global were both controlled by Oaktree Capital Management. The sale to Townsquare was completed on November 14, 2013.

== Translator ==
Broadcast translator for KROC-FM
Call sign	Frequency	City of license	FID	ERP (W)	Class	FCC info
K293CV	106.5 FM	Rochester, Minnesota	61319	250	D	LMS
