= KWWK =

Coordinates: 44.033°N 92.603°W

- Rochester, Minnesota; United States
- Broadcast area: Rochester, Minnesota
- Frequency: 96.5 MHz
- Branding: Quick Country 96.5

Programming
- Format: Country
- Affiliations: Compass Media Networks; Westwood One

Ownership
- Owner: Townsquare Media; (Townsquare License, LLC)
- Sister stations: KDCZ; KDOC-FM; KFIL; KFIL-FM; KFNL-FM; KROC; KROC-FM; KYBA

History
- First air date: 1967
- Former call signs: KOLM-FM (1967–1973)
- Call sign meaning: "Quick"

Technical information
- Licensing authority: FCC
- Facility ID: 50289
- Class: C2
- ERP: 43,000 watts
- HAAT: 161 m (528 ft)

Links
- Public license information: Public file; LMS
- Webcast: Listen live
- Website: quickcountry.com

KWWK (96.5 FM, "Quick Country 96.5") is a radio station located in Rochester, Minnesota, with a country music format. It is under ownership of Townsquare Media.

== History ==
KWWK began as KOLM-FM, a Rochester FM station owned by Olmsted County Broadcasting Company. The FCC Broadcast Bureau granted the license for the new FM station on August 23, 1967. Early station material shows the FM outlet operating on 96.7 MHz. A 1974 letter from KOLM's chief engineer referred to "FM-Station KWWK" as commonly owned with KOLM by Olmsted County Broadcasting, and the same letter stated that the operation had changed from an easy-listening format to country-western in 1968.

The KWWK call letters date to late 1973. In October 1973, Broadcasting reported that KOLM-FM had applied to change its call sign to KWWK(FM). The new call sign was reported as granted in the magazine's December 31, 1973 issue.

KOLM and KWWK continued to be operated together by Olmsted County Broadcasting. In 1974, FCC renewal notices listed KOLM-AM and KWWK-FM together. In 1975, the FCC approved a construction-permit modification for KWWK to change its antenna and transmitting equipment, with 3 kW ERP, an antenna height of 295 feet, and remote control from 114 1/2 South Broadway in Rochester. KWWK was authorized for program operating authority with changed facilities on September 11, 1975.

The station remained under local ownership for many years. A 1977 Broadcasting item identified Howard G. Bill as owner of KOLM(AM)-KWWK(FM), and a 1982 item again described Bill as owner of the Rochester stations. A 1984 Country Radio Seminar directory listed KWWK-FM as a country station at 96.7 MHz, operating with 3 kW and broadcasting 24 hours a day from 114 1/2 South Broadway.

KWWK made its major modern facility move in the early 1990s. In 1990, Broadcasting reported that KWWK, then listed at 96.7 MHz, had applied for a construction permit to increase to 35.2 kW horizontal and vertical ERP and move its transmitter to a site 3.7 kilometers east of Byron, Minnesota, near U.S. Highway 14. FCCInfo records show the station's present 96.5 MHz license-to-cover, file BLH-19921005KG, was accepted on October 5, 1992, and granted on May 17, 1993. The facility is licensed on channel 243C2 at 96.5 MHz, with 43 kW ERP and a HAAT of 161 meters.

In 2003, Cumulus Media agreed to buy 15 stations in the Rochester, Minnesota, and Sioux Falls, South Dakota, markets. The deal included KOLM(AM), KWWK(FM), and KLCX(FM), which Radio World reported Cumulus was acquiring from Olmsted County Broadcasting and Howard and Lucille Bill. Cumulus reported to the U.S. Securities and Exchange Commission that it completed its Rochester acquisitions, including KWWK-FM, in late March 2004.

KWWK later became part of Townsquare Media. On August 30, 2013, Townsquare announced that it would acquire assets including 53 Cumulus radio stations in 12 markets, including Rochester, Minnesota. Townsquare later reported in SEC filings that the Cumulus transaction closed on November 14, 2013. Townsquare currently lists KWWK as "KWWK 96.5-FM Rochester's #1 For New Country", and FCCInfo lists the station's licensee as Townsquare License, LLC.

In 2025, NorthPine reported that the Curt & Samm in the Morning show from Townsquare's "Quick Country 96.5" KWWK in Rochester was being syndicated to seven other Townsquare country stations nationwide.
