= KDCZ =

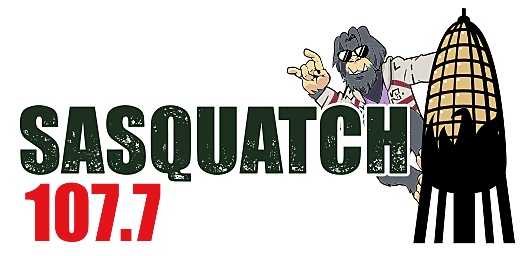
- St. Charles, Minnesota; United States
- Broadcast area: Rochester, Minnesota
- Frequency: 107.7 MHz
- Branding: Sasquatch 107.7

Programming
- Format: Classic rock
- Affiliations: Compass Media Networks

Ownership
- Owner: Townsquare Media; (Townsquare License, LLC)
- Sister stations: KDOC-FM; KFIL; KFIL-FM; KFNL-FM; KROC; KROC-FM; KWWK; KYBA

History
- First air date: April 18, 1998 (as KLCX)
- Former call signs: KANP (1996–1997); KLCX (1997–2008); KDZZ (2008–2017)

Technical information
- Licensing authority: FCC
- Facility ID: 56252
- Class: A
- ERP: 1,950 watts
- HAAT: 174 m (571 ft)
- Transmitter coordinates: 44.040°N 92.218°W

Links
- Public license information: Public file; LMS
- Webcast: Listen live
- Website: therockofrochester.com

KDCZ (107.7 FM, "Sasquatch 107.7") is a radio station broadcasting a classic rock format. KDCZ is licensed to St. Charles, Minnesota, and serves the Rochester metropolitan area. The station is owned by Townsquare Media.

== History ==
Logo as KLCX

KDCZ signed on April 18, 1998, as KLCX. The KLCX call letters were originally assigned to a station in the Palm Springs, California, market in the early 1990s but were surrendered when its new owners changed the format to smooth jazz and the call letters to KJJZ.

Z-Rock 107.7 logo

KLCX aired a classic hits format on 107.7, which moved to 103.9 FM on April 1, 2008, as 107.7 FM flipped to active rock as "Z-Rock 107.7". On March 23, 2010, KDZZ began simulcasting on KDCZ 103.9 FM.

On August 30, 2013, a deal was announced in which Townsquare Media would acquire 53 Cumulus Media stations, including KDZZ/KDCZ, for $238 million. The deal was part of Cumulus' acquisition of Dial Global; Townsquare and Dial Global were both controlled by Oaktree Capital Management. The transaction was consummated effective November 14, 2013.

On April 13, 2017, at 7:30 a.m., KDCZ split from its simulcast with KDZZ and changed its format to adult hits, branded as "103.9 The Doc". On June 2, 2017, KDZZ took on the KDCZ call sign, after 103.9 changed its call letters to KDOC-FM on May 16.

On September 2, 2021, at Noon, KDCZ dropped the "Z-Rock" moniker and began stunting with sounds of people hiking around Southeast Minnesota. At 3 p.m. on September 3, the station relaunched as classic rock-formatted "Sasquatch 107.7" (a name already in use at a sister station in Duluth).
