= KFIL-FM =

Radio station in Chatfield, Minnesota

- Chatfield, Minnesota; United States
- Broadcast area: Fillmore County, Minnesota
- Frequency: 103.1 MHz
- Branding: 103.1 KFIL

Programming
- Language: English
- Format: Classic country
- Affiliations: Linder Farm Network; Minnesota Twins

Ownership
- Owner: Townsquare Media; (Townsquare License, LLC)
- Sister stations: KFIL; KDOC-FM; KDCZ; KFNL-FM; KROC; KROC-FM; KWWK; KYBA

History
- First air date: April 1971
- Call sign meaning: Fillmore County

Technical information
- Licensing authority: FCC
- Facility ID: 34428
- Class: C3
- ERP: 3,500 watts
- HAAT: 159.1 meters (522 ft)
- Transmitter coordinates: 43°43′59″N 92°05′08″W

Links
- Public license information: Public file; LMS
- Webcast: Listen live
- Website: kfilradio.com

KFIL-FM (103.1 MHz) is an American commercial radio station licensed to serve Chatfield, Minnesota. The station, established in 1970 by O.B. Borgen, is owned by Townsquare Media and the broadcast license is held by Townsquare License, LLC.

== Programming ==
KFIL-FM broadcasts a country music format. During daylight hours, this broadcast is in conjunction with its sister station, KFIL (1060 AM). The station serves Fillmore County and the greater Rochester, Minnesota, area.

As a full service station, non-music programming includes CNN Radio, agriculture news, market reports, and specialized weather reports. KFIL-FM is an affiliate of the Linder Farm Network. KFIL-FM also broadcasts a tradio program called "Swap Shop" and a community calendar bulletin each weekday.

Weekend programming includes five hours of local church services and other Christian programming on Sunday mornings and two hours of oldies music on Sunday nights. Sports programming on KFIL-FM includes local high school football, high school basketball, high school baseball, and high school softball games during the season, KFIL Sports Round-up with Devon Krueger each weekday, plus Coaches Corner on Saturday mornings from August through April.

== History ==
=== Borgen era ===
This station received its original construction permit on September 1, 1970. It began regular broadcast operations in April 1971, with 3,000 watts of power with an antenna 270 feet (82 m) in height above average terrain. The station was assigned the call sign "KFIL-FM" by the Federal Communications Commission (FCC). The station, like its AM sister station, was originally licensed to serve the community of Preston, Minnesota.

The station was originally owned and operated by KFIL, Inc., with Obed Samuel "O.B." Borgen as president of the corporation. In October 1991, ownership of KFIL, Inc., was transferred to sons Michael S. Borgen and Jeffrey T. Borgen. The station stayed in the Borgen family's control for more than 30 years. Obed Borgen died in July 1999.

=== Cumulus era ===
In December 2003, Michael S. Borgen and Jeffrey T. Borgen sold KFIL, Inc., to Cumulus Media through its Cumulus Broadcasting, LLC, subsidiary. The published combined sale price of KFIL, KFIL-FM, and KVGO (through KVGO, Inc.) was $3,000,000. The deal gained FCC approval on February 5, 2004, and the transaction was consummated on March 30, 2004. The broadcast license for KFIL-FM was formally transferred from KFIL, Inc., to Cumulus Licensing, LLC, on December 31, 2004.

Longtime KFIL/KFIL-FM air personality Mike Sveen retired from broadcasting in 2007. The former announcer, sports reporter, and Preston, Minnesota, city council member had worked at KFIL/KFIL-FM for more than 25 years.

In September 2007, Cumulus applied to the FCC to change KFIL-FM's city of license from Preston, Minnesota, to nearby Chatfield, Minnesota. The FCC approved the change on January 8, 2008.

=== Townsquare era ===
On August 30, 2013, a deal was announced in which Townsquare Media would acquire 53 Cumulus stations, including KFIL-FM, for $238 million. The deal was part of Cumulus' acquisition of Dial Global; Townsquare and Dial Global were both controlled by Oaktree Capital Management. The sale to Townsquare was completed on November 14, 2013.

In early 2024, Townsquare closed KFIL's Preston studios and the station's control point switched to the Rochester-based studios. Townsquare had intended to sell KFIL AM, but the deal was withdrawn; KFIL-FM was not included in this sale. KFIL-FM was also not affected by the July 2026 closure of KFIL AM.
