= KFIL (AM) =

American radio station

Currently silent
- Preston, Minnesota; United States
- Broadcast area: Fillmore County, Minnesota
- Frequency: 1060 kHz
- Branding: 103.1 KFIL

Programming
- Language: English
- Format: Classic country
- Affiliations: Linder Farm Network; Minnesota Twins

Ownership
- Owner: Townsquare Media; (Townsquare License, LLC)
- Sister stations: KFIL-FM; KDOC-FM; KDCZ; KFNL-FM; KROC; KROC-FM; KWWK; KYBA

History
- First air date: June 1966
- Call sign meaning: Fillmore County

Technical information
- Licensing authority: FCC
- Facility ID: 34429
- Class: D
- Power: 1,000 watts day
- Transmitter coordinates: 43°40′49″N 92°08′31″W

Links
- Public license information: Public file; LMS
- Webcast: Listen live
- Website: www.kfilradio.com

KFIL (1060 kHz) is an American commercial AM radio station licensed to serve Preston, Minnesota. The station is licensed to broadcast only during daylight hours, and is currently silent. Established in 1966 by O.B. Borgen, KFIL is owned by Townsquare Media and the broadcast license is held by Townsquare License, LLC.

== Programming ==
Until July 1, 2026, KFIL broadcast a country music format in conjunction with its sister station, KFIL-FM 103.1. The station is a "daytimer", licensed to broadcast from local sunrise to local sunset, to avoid interfering with clear-channel stations KYW in Philadelphia, Pennsylvania, and XECPAE in Mexico City. Under a "pre-sunrise authority" granted by the Federal Communications Commission (FCC) in 2007, the station begins its broadcast day at 6:00 a.m. year-round. KFIL serves Fillmore County and the greater Rochester area.

As a full service station, non-music programming includes CNN Radio, agriculture news, market reports, and specialized weather reports. KFIL is an affiliate of the Linder Farm Network. KFIL also broadcasts a tradio program called "Swap Shop" and a community calendar bulletin each weekday.

Weekend programming includes five hours of local church services and other Christian programming on Sunday mornings. Sports programming on KFIL includes local high school football, high school basketball, high school baseball, and high school softball during the season, KFIL Sports Round-up with sports director Devon Krueger each weekday, and Coaches Corner on Saturday mornings from August through April.

== History ==
=== Borgen era ===
This station received its original construction permit on May 21, 1966. It began regular broadcast operations in June 1966, with 500 watts of power. The station was assigned the call sign "KFIL" by the FCC. The station was originally licensed to serve the community of Preston, Minnesota.

The station was originally owned and operated by KFIL, Inc., with Obed Samuel "O.B." Borgen as president of the corporation. In October 1991, ownership of KFIL, Inc., was transferred to sons Michael S. Borgen and Jeffrey T. Borgen. The station stayed in the Borgen family's control for more than 37 years. Obed Borgen died in July 1999.

=== Cumulus era ===
In December 2003, Michael S. Borgen and Jeffrey T. Borgen sold KFIL, Inc., to Cumulus Media through its Cumulus Broadcasting, LLC, subsidiary. The published combined sale price of KFIL, KFIL-FM, and KVGO (through KVGO, Inc.) was $3,000,000. The deal gained FCC approval on February 5, 2004, and the transaction was consummated on March 30, 2004. The broadcast license for KFIL was formally transferred from KFIL, Inc., to Cumulus Licensing, LLC, on December 31, 2004.

Longtime KFIL/KFIL-FM air personality Mike Sveen retired from broadcasting in 2007. The former announcer, sports reporter, and Preston, Minnesota, city council member had worked at KFIL/KFIL-FM for more than 25 years.

=== Townsquare era ===
On August 30, 2013, a deal was announced in which Townsquare Media would acquire 53 Cumulus stations, including KFIL, for $238 million. The deal was part of Cumulus' acquisition of Dial Global; Townsquare and Dial Global were both controlled by Oaktree Capital Management. The sale to Townsquare was completed on November 14, 2013.

Townsquare planned on selling the station to Bluff Country Community Radio LLC in April 2024, for $100,000, but a month later withdrew the application to transfer the station. KFIL would have become non-commercial. Townsquare had already closed KFIL's studios in Preston that February. KFIL-FM was not part of the sale.

Townsquare took KFIL off the air on July 1, 2026, due to cited economic conditions; the company has taken multiple AM stations silent across its footprint since 2024, and would have one year to return the station to the air before the FCC cancels the license automatically or if Townsquare turns in its license before that date. KFIL-FM remains in operation.
