= KDOC-FM =

Simulcasting KFNL-FM, Spring Valley
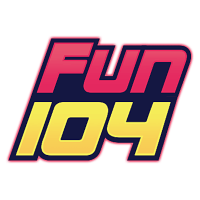
- Eyota, Minnesota; United States
- Broadcast area: Rochester, Minnesota
- Frequency: 103.9 MHz
- Branding: Fun 104

Programming
- Format: Classic hits
- Affiliations: Compass Media Networks

Ownership
- Owner: Townsquare Media; (Townsquare License, LLC)
- Sister stations: KDCZ; KFIL; KFIL-FM; KFNL-FM; KROC; KROC-FM; KWWK; KYBA

History
- First air date: April 1, 2008 (as KLCX)
- Former call signs: KDZZ (2008); KLCX (2008–2010); KDCZ (2010–2017)
- Call sign meaning: "The Doc" (branding for previous format)

Technical information
- Licensing authority: FCC
- Facility ID: 162261
- Class: A
- ERP: 1,300 watts
- HAAT: 172.7 m (567 ft)
- Transmitter coordinates: 44.040°N 92.218°W

Links
- Public license information: Public file; LMS
- Webcast: Listen live
- Website: fun1043.com

KDOC-FM (103.9 MHz; "Fun 104") is a radio station broadcasting a classic hits format, simulcasting KFNL-FM in Spring Valley, Minnesota. KDOC-FM is licensed to Eyota, Minnesota, and serves the Rochester metropolitan area. The station is owned by Townsquare Media.

The station is not related to KDOC-TV, based in Los Angeles, California.

== History ==
The station signed on April 1, 2008, as KLCX, with a classic hits format; the format and call sign were moved from 107.7 FM, which was converted to active rock station KDZZ, "Z-Rock 107.7". On March 23, 2010, the station changed its call letters to KDCZ and began simulcasting KDZZ.

On August 30, 2013, a deal was announced in which Townsquare Media would acquire 53 Cumulus Media stations, including KDZZ/KDCZ, for $238 million. The deal was part of Cumulus' acquisition of Dial Global; Townsquare and Dial Global were both controlled by Oaktree Capital Management. The transaction was consummated effective November 14, 2013.

On April 13, 2017, at 7:30 a.m., KDCZ split from its simulcast with KDZZ and changed its format to adult hits, branded as "103.9 The Doc". On May 16, 2017, KDCZ changed its call letters to KDOC-FM; the KDCZ call letters moved to KDZZ on June 2, 2017.

On September 10, 2021, KDOC-FM flipped to a simulcast of classic hits-formatted sister station KFNL-FM, branded as "Fun 104".
