= Mass media in Sioux Falls, South Dakota =

The following is a list of mass media in Sioux Falls, South Dakota, United States.

== Print ==
=== Daily ===
- Argus Leader

=== Weekly ===
- Link
- Sioux Falls Business Journal
- Sioux Falls Shopping News
- The Dakota Scout

=== Other ===
- City Style (monthly)
- ETC, For Her (monthly)
- Good Life (monthly)
- Last Call Magazine (bimonthly)
- Prime (monthly)
- Sioux Falls Woman Magazine (bimonthly)
- The Sioux Falls Headliner
- The Soo Foo

== Television ==
The Sioux Falls market is the 113th largest TV market in the United States (as ranked by Nielsen).

Channel (Digital)	Callsign	Network	Owner	Web site
7.1	KTTW	TCT	Tri-State Christian Television	
7.2	KTTW	TCT	Tri-State Christian Television	
11.1	KELO	CBS	Nexstar Media Group	
11.2	KELO	MyNetworkTV	Nexstar Media Group	
11.3	KELO	Ion Television	Nexstar Media Group	
11.4	KELO	CW+	Nexstar Media Group	
13.1	KSFY	ABC	Gray Television	
13.2	KSFY	Outlaw	Gray Television	
13.3	KSFY	MeTV	Gray Television	
13.4	KSFY	True Crime Network	Gray Television	
23.1	KCSD	PBS	SDPB	
23.2	KCSD	World	SDPB	
23.3	KCSD	Create	SDPB	
23.4	KCSD	Kids	SDPB	
23.5	KCSD	SDPB Radio	SDPB	
23.6	KCSD	SDPB Classical	SDPB	
26.1	KCPO-LD	Independent	Central Plains Media	
26.2	KCPO-LD	RTN	Central Plains Media	
26.3	KCPO-LD	Youtoo America	Central Plains Media	
46.1	KDLT	NBC	Gray Television	
46.2	KDLT	FOX	Gray Television	
46.3	KDLT	Antenna TV	Gray Television	
46.4	KDLT	Cozi TV	Gray Television	
46.5	KDLT	Court TV	Gray Television	
56	KSXF-LD	Silent	Reach High Media Group	

== Radio ==
=== AM ===
Frequency	Callsign	Nickname	Format	Owner	Web site
1000	KSOO	1000 AM KSOO	News/Talk	Townsquare Media	
1140	KXRB	South Dakota's Country Leader(Rebroadcast on 100.1FM)	Classic country	Townsquare Media	
1230	KWSN	1230 & 98.1 KWSN (Translated to 98.1FM)	Sports	Midwest Communications	
1270	KNWC	Faith 1270	Religious	Northwestern College	
1320	KELO	1320 KELO (Rebroadcast on 107.9FM)	News/Talk	Midwest Communications	
1520	KZOY	Sunny Radio (Translated to 93.3FM)	80's Hits	John & Heidi Small	

=== FM ===
Frequency	Callsign	Nickname	Format	Owner	Web site
89.7	KUSD	SD Public Radio	NPR, News/Classical	SD Public Broadcasting	
90.1	KSFS	K-LOVE	Cont. Christian music	Educational Media Foundation	
89.7	KCSD	SD Public Radio	NPR, News/Classical	SD Public Broadcasting	
92.5	KTWB	KTWB	Country	Midwest Communications	
93.3	K227CZ	Sunny Radio (Translator of KZOY)	80's Hits	John & Heidi Small	
94.5	KGWD	Real Presence Radio	Catholic talk radio	Real Presence Radio	
95.7	KQSF	Q95.7	Top 40 (CHR)	Midwest Communications	
96.5	KNWC	Life 96.5	Cont. Christian music	Northwestern College	
97.3	KKRC-FM	97.3 KKRC	Classic hits	Townsquare Media	
98.1	K251BH	1230 & 98.1 KWSN (Translator of KWSN)	Sports	Midwest Communications	
99.1	KSOO-FM	99.1/100.5 Kickin' County	Country	Townsquare Media	
100.1	KXRB-FM	South Dakota's Country Leader(Repeater of KXRB)	Classic Country	Townsquare Media	
100.5	KIKN	99.1/100.5 Kickin' Country	Country	Townsquare Media	
101.9	KELO	KELO-FM	Adult contemporary	Midwest Communications	
102.7	KYBB	B102.7	Classic rock	Townsquare Media	
103.7	KRRO	103.7 KRRO	Active Rock	Midwest Communications	
104.7	KKLS	Hot 104.7	Top 40 (CHR)	Townsquare Media	
105.5	K286CN	(Translator of KELO	News/Talk	Midwest Communications	
107.9	KELQ	KELO (Rebroadcaster of KELO)	News/Talk	Midwest Communications	

== See also ==
- List of television stations in South Dakota
