= KSOO =

KSOO may refer to:

- KSOO (AM), a radio station (1000 AM) licensed to serve Sioux Falls, South Dakota, United States
- KSOO-FM, a radio station (99.1 FM) licensed to serve Lennox, South Dakota
- KXRB (AM), a radio station (1140 AM) licensed to serve Sioux Falls, South Dakota, which held the call sign KSOO from 1926 to 2017
- KSFY-TV, a television station (channel 13 analog/29 digital) licensed to serve Sioux Falls, South Dakota, which formerly used the call sign KSOO-TV
- KKRC-FM, a radio station (97.3 FM) licensed to serve Sioux Falls, South Dakota, which formerly used the call sign KSOO-FM
