= KXRB =

KXRB may refer to:

- KXRB (AM), a radio station (1140 AM) licensed to serve Sioux Falls, South Dakota, United States
- KXRB-FM, a radio station (100.1 FM) licensed to serve Brandon, South Dakota
- KSOO (AM), a radio station (1000 AM) licensed to serve Sioux Falls, South Dakota, which held the call sign KXRB from 1969 to 2017
