= KFGO =

KFGO may refer to:

- KFGO (AM), a radio station (790 AM) licensed to Fargo, North Dakota, U.S.
- KFGO-FM, a radio station (104.7 FM) licensed to Hope, North Dakota, U.S.
- KRWK, a radio station (101.9 FM) licensed to Fargo, North Dakota, previously known as KFGO-FM from 1986 to 2002
