= KGWD =

- Sioux Falls, South Dakota; United States
- Broadcast area: Metro Sioux Falls
- Frequency: 94.5 MHz

Programming
- Format: Catholic talk and teaching
- Network: Real Presence Radio

Ownership
- Owner: Real Presence Radio

History
- First air date: September 6, 1971
- Former call signs: KCFS (1971–2015); KBAD-FM (2015–2018)
- Former frequencies: 90.1 MHz (1971–1988); 100.1 MHz (1988–1993)

Technical information
- Licensing authority: FCC
- Facility ID: 60487
- Class: C3
- ERP: 25,000 watts
- HAAT: 87.9 m (288 ft)
- Transmitter coordinates: 43°38′30″N 96°36′47″W
- Translator: 90.1 K211GF (Brookings)

Links
- Public license information: Public file; LMS
- Website: realpresenceradio.com

KGWD (94.5 FM) is a non-commercial radio station licensed to Sioux Falls, South Dakota, United States. KGWD is owned and operated by Real Presence Radio, a Catholic radio network based in Fargo, North Dakota, and has a transmitter sited northeast of Sioux Falls.

The license originally belonged to Sioux Falls College (renamed University of Sioux Falls in 1995), which started KCFS, a 10-watt noncommercial radio station, in 1971. It offered educational programming and eventually became a student-run music station. The station was bumped to other frequencies twice by more powerful stations, strengthening to 155 and later 2,900 watts. The University of Sioux Falls sold the license in 2015 to Chuck Brennan, owner of a Sioux Falls pawn shop and payday lender, who upgraded the transmitter facility and operated it as commercial station KBAD-FM. Due to legal troubles stemming from a ban on short-term payday lending in South Dakota, Brennan shut down KBAD-FM in 2017 and sold the facility to Real Presence Radio, which integrated it into its multi-state Catholic radio network.

== History ==
=== KCFS ===
Sioux Falls College had considered opening a radio station as early as 1962 and opted to include it in the construction of the Reuben P. Jeschke Fine Arts Center. After applying in May 1970, the Federal Communications Commission (FCC) authorized the construction permit for KCFS on 90.1 MHz on August 17. KCFS (Note: The call letters have been conjectured to be "SFC" backwards or possibly the college motto of "Culture for Service".) made its first program tests at the start of July 1971 with regular broadcasting following on September 6. It initially operated for thirteen hours a day, five days a week, featuring mostly music as well as educational programming and features. The speech and drama department managed the station, and students in those programs and two radio courses staffed it.

In 1978, the station began broadcasting mostly Christian rock music, though it continued to break from the format for classical music on Sundays and specialty music programming. The station broadcast with an effective radiated power of 10 watts before upgrading to either 148 or 155 watts on November 29, 1981. It continued to broadcast Christian and other kinds of rock music through the 1980s and 1990s.

Sioux Falls College was involved in bringing public radio to South Dakota with the launch of KCSD on July 1, 1985. The college provided interim studio facilities. The arrival of KCSD forced KCFS to move to 100.1 MHz in 1988. In 1992, KCFS was ordered to move to accommodate the new KIKN-FM of Salem; by February 1993, it had relocated to 94.5 MHz. The institution renamed itself the University of Sioux Falls on January 23, 1995.

In its later years, KCFS added hip-hop music programming, catering to a larger local scene. In 2008, it increased power and extended its coverage area.

=== Badlands Airtime ownership ===
The University of Sioux Falls sold the license of KCFS to Badlands Airtime, LLC—a company owned by Chuck Brennan—in May 2015 for $1.5 million, contingent on changing the station's license to commercial status and upgrading the technical facility. The university, which sold the station to raise funds for its endowment, retained the rights to the KCFS call sign and kept the radio station as an internet-only outlet. Badlands had already agreed to buy KZOY (1520 AM) and announced its intention to relaunch the station as the "Guns, Gold & Rock 'n' Roll Radio Network" in November. After agreeing to buy KCFS, he defaulted on the deal to buy KZOY, ultimately resulting in a $750,000 court judgment against him. The upgrade changed the station to a Class C3 outlet with an effective radiated power of 25,000 watts.

The new format—featuring live DJs 24 hours a day—and new KBAD-FM call letters debuted on November 26, 2015. The station's studios were inside Badlands Pawn, a tourist attraction that opened the same day in downtown Sioux Falls; singer Ron Keel was among the station's on-air presenters. It posted respectable ratings of 6.9—good for third place—and 5.9 in the first two Nielsen Audio ratings surveys after its launch in spring 2016 and 2017, competing with Townsquare Media–owned classic rock station KYBB. The ratings surveys were the first conducted in Sioux Falls in years, as Brennan and Midwest Communications both subscribed to Nielsen.

Brennan's plans to operate KBAD-FM in conjunction with the pawn shop soon hit a series of major snags, beginning when South Dakota voters banned payday lending in a ballot referendum in November 2016. Brennan's primary business—Dollar Loan Center with offices in Sioux Falls and Rapid City—temporarily closed, and he began unwinding many of his assets, including putting the Badlands Motor Speedway on the market and shutting down Badlands Pawn. During this time, KBAD continued broadcasting, and the Dollar Loan Centers reopened in July 2017 with hopes that their business model would be considered legal by the state. That September, the South Dakota Division of Banking revoked the licenses of Brennan's Dollar Loan Center, forcing it to cease operations in the state. On September 23, Brennan shut down his remaining South Dakota business ventures, including KBAD-FM, which was taken silent and immediately went on the market for $945,000.

Several members of KBAD's airstaff formed an internet radio station, KBACK Rock Radio, which began broadcasting a month after the shutdown from a home in a Sioux Falls basement. The group was unable to put together the financing to buy the KBAD-FM facility. In 2018, K-BACK moved to an office suite downtown.

=== Real Presence Radio ===
Effective June 21, 2018, Badlands Airtime, LLC, sold the KBAD-FM license and transmitter facility, but not the studios, to Real Presence Radio—a Catholic radio network based in Fargo, North Dakota—for $945,000. The new owners changed the station's call sign to KGWD on July 3, 2018. The sale to Real Presence became relevant in the dispute with the owners of KZOY, the Small family. In 2019, the Smalls sued Brennan in federal court, alleging that while $300,000 of the judgment had been paid, they had not received $450,000 in attorneys' fees. They also claimed that Brennan asked Real Presence Radio to expedite payments of the KBAD-FM purchase price to hinder recovery of the previously awarded judgment.

KGWD airs the Real Presence Radio schedule with an opt-out to air Catholic Views on mornings six days a week.
