= WSAU =

WSAU may refer to:

- WSAU (AM), a radio station (550 AM) licensed to Wausau, Wisconsin, United States
- WSAU-FM, a radio station (99.9 FM) licensed to Rudolph, Wisconsin, United States since 2009
  - WSAU-FM was until 1969 the callsign of WIFC (95.5 FM) licensed to Wausau, Wisconsin, United States
- WSAU-TV, a television station (channel 7) licensed to Wausau, Wisconsin, United States from 1954 to 1981 when it was sold and the callsign changed to WSAW-TV
