= KWSN =

Radio station in Sioux Falls, South Dakota

Coordinates: 43°27′28″N 96°40′14″W

- Sioux Falls, South Dakota; United States
- Frequency: 1230 kHz
- Branding: Sports Radio 1230 & 98.1 KWSN

Programming
- Format: Sports
- Affiliations: Fox Sports Radio; Minnesota Vikings; Minnesota Wild; Sioux Falls Canaries

Ownership
- Owner: Midwest Communications, Inc.
- Sister stations: KELO; KELO-FM; KELQ; KRRO; KQSF; KTWB

History
- First air date: May 2, 1948
- Former call signs: KISD (1948–1978); KKRC (1978–1982); KYKC (1982–1987); KKFN (1987–1990)
- Call sign meaning: "Weather, sports and news"

Technical information
- Licensing authority: FCC
- Facility ID: 59813
- Class: C
- Power: 440 watts
- Translator: 98.1 K251BH (Sioux Falls)

Links
- Public license information: Public file; LMS
- Webcast: Listen live
- Website: www.kwsn.com

KWSN (1230 AM) is a radio station carrying a sports format with Fox Sports Radio programming. The station serves the Sioux Falls, South Dakota, area. It was acquired by Midwest Communications, Inc. in 2012. This station is also aired on a translator, K251BH, at 98.1 FM.

== History ==
=== Early years ===
KDAK, Inc., obtained a construction permit for a new radio station on 1230 kHz in Sioux Falls, South Dakota, on November 13, 1947. It could not use the call letters KDAK, as they were assigned to a ship at sea; the new station therefore took the call letters KISD. It had to wait for its dial position to open up: KELO was in the process of moving from 1230 to 1320 kHz as part of a power increase. On May 2, 1948, KELO moved to 1320, and KISD debuted that same moment, using KELO's old tower site and facilities. Together with KIHO (1270 AM), which started on May 28, the two new outlets brought Sioux Falls to a total of four stations.

After filing for increased power in 1959, the Federal Communications Commission (FCC) granted a daytime power increase to 1,000 watts in October 1961. The boost became effective on March 5, 1962; at the same time, the station picked up the Mutual Broadcasting System, which had lost its affiliate in Sioux Falls the year before as the result of the sale of KIHO to Northwestern College and its transformation into a Christian radio station. It was the first network affiliation for KISD since its 13-month-long hookup with the short-lived Liberty Broadcasting System in the early 1950s.

=== Rock 'n' roll ===
Verl Thomson, who had founded the station in 1948, sold it in 1966 to a group majority-owned by William F. Buckley, Jr., publisher of the National Review; Buckley and business partner Peter Starr also owned the KOWH stations in Omaha, Nebraska. KISD's studios offices were relocated from a site on the edge of town back to downtown; Thomson remained involved with the station by broadcasting editorials but sold KISD in order to focus on his other businesses, a tourist camp and the Sioux Chief Train Motel comprising retired Pullman sleeping cars. The station's tower collapsed in 1968 when a boom attached to a sign truck snagged overhead guy wires supporting the mast. The tower, still on Verl Thomson's property, narrowly missed the train motel as it fell.

While Buckley and Starr changed the music format to contemporary, KISD's opposition to the establishment of new stations in the Sioux Falls area on economic grounds continued from former ownership. In 1963, under Thomson, KISD lodged a complaint against the Sioux Empire Broadcasting Company, which proposed to build a new station at 1520 kHz; despite a favorable ruling for the proposed station, KISD continued to object. In April 1970, more than eight years after the group had filed, the FCC granted final approval for what would become KCHF.

Starr sold KISD to Stanley Deck, who owned KDIX radio and television in Dickinson, North Dakota, for $700,000 in 1971.

=== KKRC and KYKC ===
Another North Dakota firm acquired KISD in 1977: Red River Valley Broadcasting, owned by Tom Ingstad, making its first purchase in the state of South Dakota. After the sale closed, the station changed its format to adult contemporary; on May 18, the call letters officially changed to KKRC, the first change in 30 years of broadcasting. The entire air staff was replaced and the station relocated to new studios; on the first day, the newly renamed KKRC partnered with a local gas station to sell gas for 12.3 cents per gallon, reflecting its frequency. The adult contemporary format made KKRC the fourth-rated radio station in Sioux Falls in 1980 and 1981, of a total of nine outlets.

In 1980, Ingstad acquired KLYX-FM 93.5 and relaunched it as adult contemporary station KKRZ. As a result of low ratings, both stations changed formats on January 1, 1982; the FM became Top 40 KKRC-FM, inheriting the former AM sound, while the AM flipped to country. Initially seeking the call letters KXXS, an objection by competitor KXRB forced a change to KYKC (for "kicks").

Ingstad sold six stations—AM-FM combos in Sioux Falls, Grand Forks, North Dakota, and La Crosse, Wisconsin—to Vaughn's Inc. for $8 million in 1985. While KKRC-FM became the number-one radio station in the market, KYKC found itself at the bottom; in a report on that year's radio ratings, station manager Paul Logan noted that "we will be looking at that".

On December 31, 1987, after 18 hours of stunting, KYKC threw out its country format—the records filled two garbage bins—and flipped to oldies as KKFN, "Sioux Falls' Fun Spot", playing much of the same music it would have decades earlier as KISD.

=== KWSN ===
KKFN and KKRC-FM were bought by the XMT Radio Group of Cedar Rapids, Iowa, in 1990 for $1.5 million. Major changes followed at both. KKRC-FM became classic rock KRRO on a new frequency at higher power; KKFN flipped to talk as KWSN (for "weather, sports and news") and picked up the programs of Larry King and Rush Limbaugh.

A 1994 sale attempt to sell KWSN and KRRO to Radio One of Lincoln, Nebraska, failed. SFR, Inc., acquired the stations in 1994 and sold them to Midcontinent Radio of South Dakota for $3 million in 1996; this sale brought them under common control with KELO-AM-FM and saw them move into the KELO radio studios.

KWSN remained a news-talk outlet until June 2000, when Midco opted to establish KELO AM as its news-talk station and move KWSN to a strictly sports format.

After a 52-year history in Sioux Falls radio, Midcontinent sold all of its stations, including KWSN, to Backyard Broadcasting of Baltimore in 2004. It marked the company's exit from broadcasting, having sold off KELO-TV in 1996. Backyard sold its seven Sioux Falls stations in 2012 to Midwest Communications in a $13.35 million transaction.
