= KSQB =

KSQB may refer to:

- KZHC-FM, a radio station (92.7 FM) licensed to serve Burns, Oregon, United States, which held the call sign KSQB from 2017 to 2020
- KELO-FM, a radio station (95.7 FM) licensed to serve Dell Rapids, South Dakota, United States, which held the call sign KSQB-FM from 2001 to 2013
- KZOY, a radio station (1520 AM) licensed to serve Sioux Falls, South Dakota, which held the call sign KSQB from 2001 to 2010
