= KBAD =

KBAD may refer to:

- KBAD-LD, a low-power television station (channel 30) licensed to serve Pago Pago, American Samoa
- KRLV (AM), a radio station (920 AM) licensed to serve Las Vegas, Nevada, United States, which held the call sign KBAD from 1997 to 2020
- KGWD, a radio station (94.5 FM) licensed to serve Sioux Falls, South Dakota, United States, which held the call sign KBAD-FM from 2015 to 2018
- Barksdale Air Force Base (ICAO code KBAD)
