= Y94 =

Y94 may refer to:

- KOYY, a radio station (93.7) in Fargo, North Dakota
- WYYY, a radio station (94.5) in Syracuse, New York
- Yttrium-94 (Y-94 or ^{94}Y), an isotope of yttrium
