= KELO (AM) =

News/talk radio station in Sioux Falls, South Dakota

Coordinates: 43°29′16.9″N 96°38′15.2″W

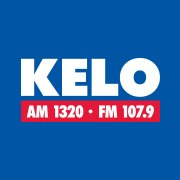
- Sioux Falls, South Dakota; United States
- Frequency: 1320 kHz
- Branding: NewsTalk 1320 KELO

Programming
- Format: Talk radio
- Affiliations: Fox News Radio; NBC News Radio; Compass Media Networks; Premiere Networks; Salem Radio Network; Westwood One; Sioux Falls Stampede

Ownership
- Owner: Midwest Communications, Inc.
- Sister stations: KELO-FM; KELQ; KRRO; KQSF; KTWB; KWSN

History
- First air date: September 9, 1937
- Former frequencies: 1200 kHz (1937-1941); 1230 kHz (1941-1948)
- Call sign meaning: Pronounced "kellow" to rhyme with "hello"

Technical information
- Licensing authority: FCC
- Facility ID: 41981
- Class: B
- Power: 5,000 watts
- Translator: 105.1 K286CN (Sioux Falls)
- Repeater: 107.9 KELQ (Flandreau)

Links
- Public license information: Public file; LMS
- Webcast: Listen live
- Website: kelo.com

KELO (1320 AM, "Newstalk 1320 KELO") is an radio station licensed to Sioux Falls, South Dakota, United States, airing a talk format. It is owned by Midwest Communications, Inc.

== History ==
Originally issued a construction permit under the call sign KGSS in 1936, KELO signed on September 9, 1937, on 1200 kHz, under the ownership of the Sioux Falls Broadcasting Association, also the owner of KSOO. Both stations were affiliates of the NBC radio networks. It moved to 1230 kHz in 1941 as a result of the NARBA agreement. KELO was sold to the Midcontinent Broadcasting Company on September 19, 1946. It moved to its current frequency May 2, 1948, and concurrently increased its power from 250 watts to 5 kW.

KELO was a Top 40 station from approximately the 1960s through the 1980s, and then became an oldies/classic hits hybrid by the 1990s. The station flipped to its current talk format in July 2000.

KELO-TV was co-owned with KELO radio from 1953 until 1995, when Midcontinent sold the TV station to Young Broadcasting (Nexstar Media Group is the current owner of KELO-TV today). The broadcaster, which later became Midcontinent Media, sold off its radio properties, including KELO, to Backyard Broadcasting in 2004. The Backyard Broadcasting group would be sold to its current owner, Midwest Communications, in 2012.
