= KTFJ =

KTFJ may refer to:

- KTFJ-LP, a low-power radio station (104.7 FM) licensed to serve Burlington, Washington, United States
- KZOI, a radio station (1250 AM) licensed to serve Dakota City, Nebraska, United States, which held the call sign KTFJ from 1988 to 2014
