= KVOX =

KVOX may refer to:

- KVOX-FM, is a radio station (99.9 FM) licensed to Moorhead, North Dakota, United States
- KNFL (AM), is a radio station (740 AM) licensed to Fargo, North Dakota, United States, which held the call sign KVOX from 2007 to 2017
