= KSTJ =

KSTJ may refer to:

- KSTJ (FM), a radio station (91.3 FM) licensed to serve Hartford, South Dakota, United States
- KSTJ-LP, a defunct low-power radio station (104.3 FM) licensed to serve Sioux Falls, South Dakota
- KVPH, a radio station (104.3 FM) licensed to serve Las Vegas, Nevada, United States, which used the call sign KSTJ from September 1998 to October 2007
- The ICAO airport code for Rosecrans Memorial Airport in St. Joseph, Missouri, United States
- A Knight of the Venerable Order of Saint John
