= KQFR =

KQFR may refer to:

- KQFR (FM), a radio station (90.7 FM) licensed to serve Moyle Springs, Idaho, United States; see List of radio stations in Idaho
- KJRC, a radio station (89.9 FM) licensed to serve Rapid City, South Dakota, United States, which held the call sign KQFR from 2002 to 2015
