= KNFX =

KNFX may refer to:

- KNFX-FM, a radio station (99.5 FM) licensed to Bryan, Texas, United States
- KQAQ, a radio station (970 AM) licensed to Austin, Minnesota, United States, which used the call sign KNFX from February 1994 to May 2008
