= KRRO =

Radio station in Sioux Falls, South Dakota

Coordinates: 43°27′27″N 96°40′14″W

- Sioux Falls, South Dakota; United States
- Frequency: 103.7 MHz
- Branding: 103.7 KRRO

Programming
- Format: Mainstream rock
- Affiliations: United Stations Radio Networks

Ownership
- Owner: Midwest Communications; (Midwest Communications, Inc.)
- Sister stations: KELO; KELO-FM; KELQ; KQSF; KTWB; KWSN

History
- First air date: May 6, 1969
- Former call signs: KCHF-FM (1969–1977); KLYX-FM (1977–1981); KKRZ (1981–1982); KKRC-FM (1982–1990)
- Former frequencies: 93.5 MHz (1969–1990)
- Call sign meaning: Pronounced as "crow"

Technical information
- Licensing authority: FCC
- Facility ID: 59814
- Class: C2
- ERP: 38,000 watts
- HAAT: 120 meters (390 ft)

Links
- Public license information: Public file; LMS
- Webcast: Listen live
- Website: www.krro.com

KRRO (103.7 FM) is a radio station in Sioux Falls, South Dakota, airing a mainstream rock format. The station is owned by Midwest Communications through licensee Midwest Communications, Inc.

Its studios are located on South Phillips Avenue in Sioux Falls, while its transmitter is located on 271st Street just south of Sioux Falls.

== History ==
=== KCHF-FM ===
The station began operation at 93.5 MHz as KCHF-FM on May 6, 1969. It was owned by Eider C. "Red" Stangland, who had waited for years with his application to build an AM outlet at 1520 kHz and previously owned a station in Iowa. It was the last of three radio station sign-ons in Sioux Falls in the first five months of 1969 (preceded by KXRB and KNWC-FM). (The Sioux Empire Broadcasting Company was approved the next year for the AM outlet, which went on the air on June 13, 1970 as KCHF.) KCHF-AM-FM largely simulcast the same middle-of-the-road music format.

=== KLYX-FM and KKRZ ===
Significant changes came to KCHF-FM when it was sold in 1977 to Sodak Broadcasting, Inc. On December 1, 1977, the new owners blew up a format that was considered a perennial also-ran in the ratings and relaunched KCHF-AM-FM as KLYX-AM-FM, a soft rock station. To the station's surprise, however, ratings dropped; the station blamed its "Stereo 93" moniker being close to a more well-known station, "Stereo 92" KELO-FM, resulting in KELO-FM being attributed listenership to KLYX-FM. The station had adopted the "X93" brand by 1979 and an album-oriented rock format which caused it to surge to fourth place in the Sioux Falls ratings.

In 1981, Sodak sold KLYX AM and FM to separate ownership; for the FM station, the buyer was Red River Communications (Thomas E. Ingstad), which already owned KKRC radio. The sale for between $325,000 and $375,000 led to KLYX-FM becoming KKRZ on March 4, 1981. Not only did Ingstad institute new call letters and a more adult contemporary sound as "Z93", but the new management fired almost all of the station's staff just 36 hours before Christmas. The move back to adult contemporary caused KKRZ's ratings to drop again in 1981.

=== KKRC-FM ===
KKRZ became KKRC-FM on New Year's Day 1982 as the AM station flipped to country; it moved even further to Top 40 (CHR) as a result, inheriting the format that had been on the AM. The move was also designed to help the FM, which ranked eighth in a nine-station market. The Top 40 move made an immediate impact and turned KKRC-FM into the new radio leader in Sioux Falls in the spring 1982 Arbitron book.

Ingstad sold six stations—AM-FM combos in Sioux Falls, Grand Forks, North Dakota, and La Crosse, Wisconsin—to Vaughn's Inc. for $8 million in 1985. After a time away from number one in 1986, KKRC-FM returned to the top spot in 1987, fueled by increased teenage listenership.

In 1989, KKRC-FM tweaked its format to add classic rock, in order to increase older listenership. KKRC-FM and its associated AM, now KKFN, were bought by the XMT Radio Group of Cedar Rapids, Iowa, in 1990 for $1.5 million.

=== KRRO and the move to 103.7 ===
On the night of September 28, 1990, KKRC-FM moved to 103.7 MHz and completed its full format flip to classic rock as KRRO. The frequency change came with a power increase from 3,000 to 50,000 watts. Besides the new "crow" moniker, the station also promoted itself as "Klassic Rock 'n' Roll", using the call letters.

The station made news in 1991 when it and several other groups in Sioux Falls were duped by Carroll Lee Church, a 33-year-old man who claimed to be Billy Powell of Lynyrd Skynyrd; Church even sang in the KRRO studios. Chuck Brennan, an assistant manager of a nearby bar, helped police set up a sting operation to arrest Church, who was charged with felony grand theft by deception.

A 1994 sale attempt to sell the station (and KKFN, which became KWSN) to Radio One of Lincoln, Nebraska, failed. SFR, Inc., acquired the stations in 1994 and sold them to Midcontinent Radio of South Dakota for $3 million in 1996; this sale brought them under common control with KELO-AM-FM and saw them move into the KELO radio studios.

Even with its classic rock format, KRRO continued to be a ratings winner. It returned to number one overall in 1995, knocking KTWB out of first place for the first time in three years. The station expected further improvements, particularly to its signal in Iowa, with its 1998 move to a new tower in northern Lincoln County.

In 2000, tragedy struck at KRRO as one of its most popular disc jockeys and its program director, 36-year-old John C. Price, died of a heart attack. He had hosted the station's morning show since 1996. The station eventually segued to active rock.

=== Backyard Broadcasting ===
After a 52-year history in Sioux Falls radio, Midcontinent sold all of its stations, including KRRO, to Backyard Broadcasting of Baltimore in 2004. It marked the company's exit from broadcasting, after selling KELO-TV in 1996.

=== Midwest Communications ===
Backyard sold its seven Sioux Falls stations in 2012 to Midwest Communications in a $13.35 million transaction.

The KKRC-FM call letters were revived on August 31, 2020, when Townsquare Media flipped the former KMXC to classic hits.
