= WRIG =

- Schofield, Wisconsin; United States
- Broadcast area: Wausau-Stevens Point
- Frequency: 1390 kHz
- Branding: 93.9 The Game

Programming
- Format: Sports
- Affiliations: Fox Sports Radio; Wisconsin Sports Radio Network

Ownership
- Owner: Midwest Communications; (WRIG, Inc.)
- Sister stations: WDEZ; WIFC; WOZZ; WSAU; WSAU-FM

History
- First air date: January 30, 1937
- Former call signs: WSAU (1937–1958)
- Former frequencies: 1370 kHz (1937–1941); 1400 kHz (1941–1985)
- Call sign meaning: Derived from the name of the Wright family, which has owned the station since 1958

Technical information
- Licensing authority: FCC
- Facility ID: 73946
- Class: B
- Power: 10,000 watts day 7,200 watts night
- Transmitter coordinates: 44°52′42″N 89°38′29″W
- Translator: 93.9 W230BU (Rothschild)

Links
- Public license information: Public file; LMS
- Website: 939thegame.com

WRIG (1390 AM) is a radio station broadcasting a sports format licensed to Schofield, Wisconsin, United States, and serving the Wausau area. The station is currently owned by Midwest Communications and features programming from Fox Sports Radio. It is also broadcast on FM translator W230BU at 93.9 MHz.

The station history of WRIG begins with the 1937 launch of WSAU, the first station in Wausau. In 1958, WSAU sold the 1400 kHz frequency to move to a stronger facility, and the Wright family acquired it and started WRIG; this marked the beginning of Midwest Communications as a company. Formats on the station since 1958 have included top 40, oldies, adult standards, and sports talk.

== History ==
=== WSAU ===
In late 1935, the Federal Communications Commission (FCC) received two mutually exclusive applications to start new radio stations in Wausau, Wisconsin. Both were from out-of-town investors. The Wausau Broadcasting Company, with investment from Minnesota and South Dakota individuals led by Emmons Abeles, and the Madison-based Northern Broadcasting Company sought the frequency of 1370 kHz. At comparative hearing, the Wausau Broadcasting group admitted none of the principals had ever visited the namesake city. FCC hearing examiner P. W. Seward initially recommended both applications be denied, particularly Wausau Broadcasting because one of its corporations was not qualified to do business in Wisconsin, but Northern appealed the denial of its application and won a construction permit for a 100-watt, daytime-only station on September 29, 1936.

After changing its call letters from WDRB, WSAU debuted on January 30, 1937. From studios on Third Street in the Leath and Company building, the station's initial lineup consisted of news, music, entertainment, and farm information programs. Operating for its first months on a daytime-only basis, the station applied shortly before launch for authority to broadcast at night, receiving it in September and beginning nighttime service on October 12. Power was increased to 250 watts in 1938, and the station moved from 1370 to 1400 kHz when NARBA took effect on March 29, 1941.

In 1947, WSAU, along with an unbuilt FM construction permit, was sold to The Milwaukee Journal, which received approval in mid-June and began operating the Wausau station on June 20. The Journal was bullish on FM and hoped to construct a regional FM network, with the new WSAU-FM as one of the links; a facility was built on Rib Mountain in 1948 to house the AM and FM stations' transmitters, and both stations moved their studios to the Plumer mansion in 1949. However, the band failed to take off with listeners, and WSAU-FM was shuttered in April 1950. The Journal had not planned on continuing to run a 250-watt AM radio station, but it felt that it had a responsibility to the community to keep Wausau's only local station on the air. When an offer was made by John Tomek—owner of a station at Rhinelander and applicant for another in Wausau—and Charles Lemke, the Journal opted to sell.

In February 1952, WSAU filed to start a television station on channel 7, in advance of the FCC lifting its four-year freeze on new TV station licenses. The radio station was joined by two other applicants: Wausau's second station, WOSA (which withdrew and sought a UHF channel), and the Wisconsin Valley Television Company, a consortium of local newspapers—the Wausau Daily Record-Herald, Wisconsin Rapids Daily Tribune, Merrill Daily Herald, Rhinelander Daily News, and Antigo Daily Journal, as well as the radio stations owned by the Wisconsin Rapids and Antigo newspapers. In March 1954, comparative hearings began between WSAU and Wisconsin Valley. They ended days later when Tomek and Lemke's company, WSAU, Inc., agreed to drop its application and sell the radio station to Wisconsin Valley, leaving it uncontested for channel 7 and leading to the construction of WSAU-TV that year.

Over the years, WSAU had attempted to increase power by applying twice for frequency changes. It unsuccessfully sought 1250 kHz in 1944, and a second application had been made in 1957 to increase to 5,000 watts day and 1,000 watts night at 1320 kHz. However, that would prove unnecessary. In January 1958, the Wisconsin Valley Television Company entered into an agreement to purchase WOSA and its FM companion at Merrill, Wisconsin, WLIN, from Alvin O'Konski for $225,000. Wisconsin Valley would retain the WOSA facility and move WSAU onto it, selling off the 250-watt station at 1400 kHz.

=== WRIG ===
Wisconsin Valley could not close on the purchase until the 1400 kHz frequency and physical plant was sold, and a buyer was found in May: Duey Wright, the owner of the Wright's Music Store and a school of music in Wausau, who would take over the 1400 frequency using the call sign WRIG and set up studios above the music store. On August 1, 1958, the realignment of radio frequencies portended by the sale became reality. WSAU and its programming moved from 1400 to 550 kHz, incorporating selected WOSA programs, and WRIG debuted with a music-heavy format at 1400 kHz.

An independent outlet for its first year, WRIG joined the CBS network in July 1959. It emerged as a Top 40 station, calling itself "Big Wrig". WRIG-FM was started in 1964 and became WDEZ in 1973; it has aired a country music format since the early 1980s.

Duey "Duke" Wright Jr., the son of founder Duey Wright Sr., was a DJ at the station when it started and worked in various positions over the years at the outlet, becoming general manager in 1965; he moved to Green Bay in 1975 when he acquired stations there. Wright Jr. had grown up on Wausau music and radio; in a 2002 interview with Radio & Records, he quipped, "I proudly announced that I could spell the name of our town: 'W-S-A-U'; actually, that was the station we listened to." By 2019, Midwest Communications owned 75 stations in states stretching from North Dakota to Tennessee.

In 1985, the station changed to 1390 kHz and increased power to 5,000 watts, becoming the area's first AM stereo station in the process. This also led to the change in community of license from Wausau to Schofield. The station switched from oldies to adult standards in 1993, dropping the format and changing to Fox Sports Radio in 2003. The move allowed WSAU—which Wright purchased in 1996—to add more non-sports talk shows to its lineup. The station reverted to oldies but then flipped back to Fox Sports in 2009.

On November 2, 2020, WRIG rebranded as "93.9 The Game" with weekday daytime programming originating from WRNW in Milwaukee. In October 2025, it switched to carrying the new Wisconsin Sports Radio Network from WSSP in Milwaukee.
