= KVXR =

- Moorhead, Minnesota; United States
- Broadcast area: Fargo–Moorhead
- Frequency: 1280 kHz
- Branding: Real Presence Radio

Programming
- Format: Catholic
- Affiliations: Real Presence Radio, EWTN Radio

Ownership
- Owner: Real Presence Radio

History
- First air date: November 30, 1937
- Former call signs: KVOX (1937–2007)

Technical information
- Licensing authority: FCC
- Facility ID: 35863
- Class: B
- Power: 5,000 watts (day); 1,000 watts (night)
- Transmitter coordinates: 46°49′10″N 96°45′56″W
- Translator: 98.3 K252GC (Fargo)

Links
- Public license information: Public file; LMS
- Webcast: Listen Live
- Website: yourcatholicradiostation.com

KVXR (1280 kHz) is a radio station located in Moorhead, MN airing Catholic programming the Real Presence Radio, including programming from the national EWTN Radio network. KVXR is owned by Real Presence Radio of Grand Forks, North Dakota

== History ==
KVXR signed on the air November 30, 1937.

The station was previously KVOX, a part of James Ingstad's Radio Fargo-Moorhead, though it was donated to Voice of Reason Radio on June 11, 2007. Ingstad purchased KKAG, and KVOX and its format was moved to 740 AM. On September 14, 2007, 1280 changed its call letters to KVXR, and flipped to Relevant Radio, with KVOX moving to 740 AM. On April 23, 2009, Real Presence Radio signed the final papers for purchasing 1280am KVXR from VRR. It now carries the Real Presence Radio network based at KWTL in Grand Forks
