= KSMR (FM) =

- Winona, Minnesota; United States
- Frequency: 92.5 MHz

Programming
- Format: Catholic talk and teaching
- Network: Real Presence Radio

Ownership
- Owner: Real Presence Radio

History
- First air date: April 18, 1979
- Call sign meaning: Saint Mary's Radio, from when the station was owned by Saint Mary's University of Minnesota

Technical information
- Licensing authority: FCC
- Facility ID: 58590
- Class: D
- ERP: 4 watts
- HAAT: −43 meters (−141 ft)
- Transmitter coordinates: 44°2′47.00″N 91°41′43.00″W
- Translator: 94.3 K232CZ (Winona)

Links
- Public license information: Public file; LMS
- Website: realpresenceradio.com

KSMR (92.5 FM) is a non-commercial radio station broadcasting a Catholic radio format licensed to Winona, Minnesota, United States. It is part of Real Presence Radio, a regional Catholic radio network based in Fargo, North Dakota. The station is relayed over low-power FM translator K232CZ (94.3 FM).

This station was built by Saint Mary's College (later Saint Mary's University). It began broadcasting in 1979 on 90.9 MHz and moved to 92.5 in 1983. Because of terrain, the 94.3 translator at Winona was built in 1997. Saint Mary's continued to own KSMR until it went off the air in 2019. It was gifted to Real Presence Radio the next year. KSMR's transmitter remains sited on the Saint Mary's campus.

== History ==
Last logo under SMUMN ownership

Saint Mary's College had a student-run, non-broadcast radio station on campus dating to 1957. In 1976, the cable television system in Winona added the station to its lineup, expanding its reach outside the campus. On September 13, 1977, Saint Mary's College received a construction permit for a new 10-watt, Class D radio station to broadcast on 90.9 MHz. It went on the air April 18, 1979.

In May 1983, the station moved to 92.5 MHz. It switched to album-oriented rock in 1985 and moved from the basement of Heffron Hall to the college center that year.

Because of the location of the 10-watt station, parts of Winona were shaded by bluffs and could not receive KSMR. In 1995, the station applied for a translator on 94.3 MHz to be located on the campus of the former College of Saint Teresa. The application was granted, and K232CZ began broadcasting in 1997.

Most of the music heard on KSMR (outside of specific programs) was in the rock, indie, and indie pop styles, and a growing number of top 40 music also played. In October 2013, KSMR updated its music library to play more top 40 music, along with 1980s, classic rock, and oldies music in an attempt to become the top variety station in Winona.

A transmitter malfunction took KSMR silent in September 2019. In June 2020, the university gifted KSMR and its translator to Real Presence Radio.

== Translator ==
KSMR's signal is relayed over the following low-power translator:

Broadcast translator for KSMR
Call sign	Frequency	City of license	FID	ERP (W)	HAAT	Class	Transmitter coordinates	FCC info
K232CZ	94.3 FM	Winona, Minnesota	77735	104	−71 m (−233 ft)	D	44°3′2″N 91°40′5″W	LMS
