= KZOY =

Radio station in Sioux Falls, South Dakota

- Sioux Falls, South Dakota; United States
- Frequency: 1520 kHz
- Branding: Sunny 93.3

Programming
- Format: 1980s hits
- Affiliations: Premiere Networks; CloudCast Radio (WXMT)

Ownership
- Owner: John E. Small & Heidi Small; (Cup O'Dirt, LLC)

History
- First air date: 1971
- Former call signs: KCHF (1971–1977); KLYX (1977–1980); KRSS (1981–1985); KJIA (1985–1993); KCGN (1993–1997); KSFS (1997–2001); KSQB (2001–2010)

Technical information
- Licensing authority: FCC
- Facility ID: 48026
- Class: D
- Power: 500 watts (day only)
- Transmitter coordinates: 43°33′28″N 96°47′46″W
- Translator: 93.3 K227CZ (Sioux Falls)

Links
- Public license information: Public file; LMS
- Webcast: Listen live
- Website: www.sunnyradio.com

KZOY (1520 AM) is a daytime-only radio station licensed for 500 watts in Sioux Falls, South Dakota. Daytime-only operation protects clear-channel stations KOKC at Oklahoma City and WWKB at Buffalo, New York. It also broadcasts on FM translator K227CZ 93.3 FM in Sioux Falls from its transmitter site near the intersection of West Madison and Marion Roads.

== History ==
=== Beginnings ===
The construction permit for this station was first issued on November 2, 1961, to Sioux Empire Broadcasting Company, headed by Eider and Wallace Stangland. However, the station, then known as KCHF, would not go on the air until 1971, likely due to delays in finding a suitable site to build a transmitting antenna. Studios were located at 104 East 8th Street in Sioux Falls. A co-owned sister station, KCHF-FM 93.5, had begun the year before.

=== Ownership ===
KCHF was then sold in July 1977 to Sodak Broadcasting. Shortly afterwards, the station assumed the call sign KLYX. The station was sold again in October 1980 to Mid-America Radio, a company headed by George Robertson. The station then took another call sign change, this time to KRSS.

The station was sold again in 1985 to Nehemiah Radio Productions, a company headed by Jeff Sauer. The station's call letters were changed to KJIA and adopted a contemporary Christian format, which was maintained after another ownership change in 1993. In June of that year, the station was purchased by CGN Corporation, a company headed by Verlyn Manning. The call letters were then changed to KCGN, and then to KSFS in 1997 concurrent with a format change to all-sports programming.

In July 2001, the station was sold to L.A. Skywave for $155,000. Lee Axdahl assumed the role as station general manager. The call letters were changed to KSQB, sharing calls with KSQB-FM 95.7 in Dell Rapids. The station would later simulcast country-formatted KXQL at Flandreau as "Kool 107.9", after coming under the ownership of Backyard Broadcasting in August 2006 in a duopoly transaction. Studios were then re-located to 500 South Phillips Avenue in Sioux Falls.

=== Sunny Radio ===
Sunny Radio was formed by a local couple, John and Heidi Small. John had previous radio experience and always dreamed of owning his own station. In the summer of 2009, the couple built the Sioux Empire's only locally owned radio station, as the others are all owned by companies. They decided on a 1980s format since the music is fun to dance to, which goes with their 'sunny' theme, and also to cater to the older audience who were previously left with no choice but to listen to modern music because there was little variety. They went with the slogan "Sunny Radio, where it's ALWAYS in the 80's!"

Although it is mainly a Sioux Empire station, a great deal of talk revolves around Brandon, the community the Smalls live in.

In 2010, the Smalls purchased KSQB from Backyard Broadcasting; ownership was transferred John E. Small's Cup O'Dirt, LLC, on May 14, 2010. Three days later, the call letters were changed to KZOY. KZOY launched on May 15, 2010, FM 92.1 launched September 1, 2010. Sunny is no longer broadcasting at 92.1 MHz; KZOY is repeated on K227CZ (93.3 FM).

The station added a second channel in Dakota City, Nebraska, KZOI (1250 AM), which is repeated on K246CJ (97.1 FM) in Sioux City, Iowa, as of February 2016. This addition was borne of a desire to expand the reach of their market, as well as to improve the quality and scope of their broadcasting infrastructure.

The station also broadcasts online at its website.

The small radio station is growing rapidly with many national programs from the 1980s on the weekends like Casey Kasem's 80's show, The Amazing 80's with MG Kelly and Rick Dees Weekly Top 40. During the week, the radio shows are all local, these include: The John and Heidi Show, Maddy in the Midday, The B Side with Joshua Wayne, Jammin' Jay Williams and "The Night Ride" with KITT runs overnight.

== Programming ==
Small and his wife Heidi co-host the station's morning show.

The station is the flagship station of CloudCast, a syndication service providing voice-tracked shows, including the Smalls' morning show.

KZOY is one of the few radio stations in America to play the classic 80's version of the Rick Dees Weekly Top 40.

== Broadcast Locations ==
- KZOY and K227CZ: Sioux Falls, South Dakota 43°33′28″N 96°47′47″W
- KZOI: Dakota City, Nebraska 42°26′33″N 96°15′42″W
- K246CJ: Sioux City, Iowa 42°32′16″N 96°26′59″W
