= WDEZ =

- Wausau, Wisconsin; United States
- Broadcast area: Wausau-Stevens Point
- Frequency: 101.9 MHz (HD Radio)
- Branding: WDEZ 101.9

Programming
- Format: Country

Ownership
- Owner: Midwest Communications; (WRIG, Inc.)
- Sister stations: WIFC; WOZZ; WRIG; WSAU; WSAU-FM

History
- First air date: 1964
- Former call signs: WRIG-FM (1964–1973)
- Call sign meaning: "Duke's EZ", after owner Duke Wright

Technical information
- Licensing authority: FCC
- Facility ID: 70522
- Class: C
- ERP: 100,000 watts
- HAAT: 329 meters
- Transmitter coordinates: 44°55′14″N 89°41′28″W

Links
- Public license information: Public file; LMS
- Webcast: Listen live
- Website: www.wdez.com

WDEZ (101.9 FM) is a radio station broadcasting a country music format. Licensed to Wausau, Wisconsin, United States, the station serves the Wausau-Stevens Point area. The station is owned by Midwest Communications. The station is also broadcast on HD radio.

== History ==
WDEZ first signed on the air in 1964 with the call sign WRIG-FM. The station was established as the FM sister station to WRIG (1400 AM). The call sign was changed to WDEZ in 1973. The DEZ in the call sign is derived from the nickname "Duke's E-Z" after the station owner, Duey Wright, reflecting the beautiful music format at the time.

The station is owned by Midwest Communications, a privately held company based in Wausau, Wisconsin, which has been in operation for over 60 years. WDEZ operates as a Class C FM station.
