= WBKK =

- Wilton, Minnesota; United States
- Broadcast area: Bemidji, Minnesota
- Frequency: 820 kHz

Programming
- Format: Catholic talk
- Affiliations: Real Presence Radio

Ownership
- Owner: Real Presence Radio

History
- First air date: October 2012

Technical information
- Licensing authority: FCC
- Facility ID: 160559
- Class: B
- Power: 10,000 watts (day); 750 watts (night)
- Transmitter coordinates: 47°23′29″N 95°04′40″W (day); 47°24′0″N 94°58′30″W (night)
- Translator: (98.7 MHz) K254DJ (Bemidji)

Links
- Public license information: Public file; LMS
- Webcast: Listen live
- Website: yourcatholicradiostation.com

WBKK (820 AM) is a radio station licensed to Wilton, Minnesota, serving the Bemidji market area. The station airs a Catholic talk format as an owned and operated affiliate of Real Presence Radio.

Its 10,000 watt transmitter and towers are located south of Bemidji, on Trout Haven Road, near Lake Plantagenet.

The station was assigned the WBKK call letters by the Federal Communications Commission on May 14, 2008.

== FM translator ==
On June 8, 2018, Real Presence Radio bought a construction permit for 98.7 MHz, suggesting an FM translator would be operating soon. The translator, K254DJ, received its broadcast license on December 14, 2021.

== History ==
It debuted in October 2012, with a mostly news-talk format. The station aired CBS Radio News, local news and weather reports. Syndicated talk shows, including Laura Ingraham, The Common Sense Club (radio talk show from Fargo, North Dakota), and Jason Lewis were weekday features. Locally originated oldies were broadcast on the weekends. The station was originally owned by De La Hunt Broadcasting of Park Rapids, Minnesota, and licensed to Edward De la Hunt, Sr. The station was sold to Real Presence Radio of Grand Forks, ND effective October 19, 2015, at a purchase price of $225,000.
