= WWEN =

Coordinates: 46°32′7.9″N 92°4′7.9″W

- Wentworth, Wisconsin; United States
- Broadcast area: Duluth-Superior area
- Frequency: 88.1 MHz

Programming
- Format: Religious

Ownership
- Owner: Real Presence Radio

History
- First air date: 2010

Technical information
- Licensing authority: FCC
- Facility ID: 88658
- Class: A
- ERP: 1,800 watts
- HAAT: 139 meters (456 ft)

Links
- Public license information: Public file; LMS
- Website: http://www.yourcatholicradiostation.com

WWEN (88.1 FM) is a radio station broadcasting a Catholic religious format. Licensed to Wentworth, Wisconsin, United States, the station covers the Duluth-Superior area. The station is an owned and operated affiliate of Real Presence Radio.

== History ==
WWEN began broadcasting 2010. It was originally owned by American Family Association, and was an affiliate of American Family Radio's AFR Inspirational network. In 2016, the station was sold to Real Presence Radio for $200,000 (equivalent to $268,303 in 2025).
