= WHTC =

Radio station in Holland, Michigan

Coordinates: 42°47′41″N 86°06′22″W

- Holland, Michigan; United States
- Broadcast area
- Frequency: 1450 kHz
- Branding: 99 7 and 1450 WHTC

Programming
- Format: News Talk (mornings), oldies (other times)
- Affiliations: NBC News Radio; WQXC-FM; Detroit Lions; Detroit Red Wings

Ownership
- Owner: Midwest Communications; (Midwest Communications, Inc.)
- Sister stations: WYVN

History
- First air date: July 31, 1948
- Call sign meaning: Holland Tulip City

Technical information
- Licensing authority: FCC
- Facility ID: 27470
- Class: C
- Power: 1,000 watts unlimited
- Translator: 99.7 W259CO (Holland)

Links
- Public license information: Public file; LMS
- Webcast: Listen Live
- Website: whtc.com

WHTC (1450 AM) is a news/talk and oldies radio station in Holland, Michigan.

== History ==
The station signed on July 31, 1948, at 6:00 p.m. and originally was owned by six Holland-area businessmen: I.H Marsilje, Nelson Bosman (who served as mayor of Holland from 1961 to 1971), W.A. Butler (former owner of the Holland Evening Sentinel), Millard Westrate, Willard Wichers and P.T. Chef. All are since deceased. Michael Walton of Milwaukee, Wisconsin purchased the station (along with the old WHTC-FM) from the original owners in 1981. On September 20, 2000, Walton sold his four-station operation (including WHBL, WWJR and WBFM Sheboygan, Wisconsin) to Midwest Communications, Inc.

WHTC-FM (96.1), which signed on in 1961 and later went by the call letters WYXX and WKEZ, was sold to Federated Communications in 1994. It was subsequently acquired by Clear Channel Communications and has undergone a number of call letter and format changes, currently operating as WMAX-FM, with an all-sports format (ESPN).

WHTC is an affiliate of CBS Radio and carries Detroit Tigers Baseball, area high school football and basketball, the Detroit Lions and Red Wings.

In February 2016 the station was granted a construction permit to operate an FM translator, W259CO, on 99.7 FM. The translator debuted on March 10, 2017.

== Programming ==
Juke Van Oss worked at WHTC from August 12, 1951, until his death on March 7, 2016, after nearly 65 years. During his career, he served as an engineer, program host, and assistant station manager. In 1961 Van Oss became co-host of Talk of the Town, a daily two-hour call-in program developed by Bill Gargano in 1959. Van Oss and Gargano shared hosting duties until Van Oss became the sole host of the program in 1981. Van Oss was inducted into the Michigan Broadcasting Hall of Fame on July 14, 2009. Van Oss died at the age of 92. Long-time WHTC broadcaster Ed VerSchure began hosting Talk of the Town after the death of Van Oss, hosting mornings on WHTC in the early 1960s and working for over 25 years at WZZM-TV Grand Rapids. VerSchure was also co-owner of WEVS Saugatuck, now owned by Midwest Communications and known as 92 7 The Van WYVN, WHTC's sister station. Talk of the Town was later hosted by Gary Stevens.

The WHTC Morning News debuted in July 2014 with news, weather, sports, traffic reports and various segments including local sponsors, community events, and history. Weekly guests have included the Mayor Of Holland, Congressmen Bill Huizenga and Fred Upton, authors, political figures and others. Dan Evans became the host of the show in April 2022. WHTC's news director Gary Stevens provides news.

On September 2, 2008, WHTC began carrying The Huge Show, a local sports talk show hosted by Bill Simonson, which is syndicated to stations in Michigan and originates in Grand Rapids.

Lupita Reyes developed and hosted Alegria Latina, an all Spanish language music, news, and information program on WHTC which aired from 1965 to 2009. On July 5, 2009, the program moved to 92.7 The Van WYVN. After 57 years of hosting the program, Lu Reyes retired on December 12, 2021.

WHTC's talk line-up also includes Markley Van Camp and Robbins, The Joe Pags Show, Mark Levin, and Red Eye Radio.

In April 2011 WHTC began live streaming of its programming which can be accessed on desktops, tablets, the station smartphone app, Alexa, Apple, and Google devices.

Former Michigan Congressman Guy Vander Jagt and Detroit sportscaster Al Ackerman are among the notable figures who worked at WHTC in the 1950s.

On September 5th, 2025, it was reported that WHTC has reduced most of its talk radio programming to mornings and Saturday nights, and began airing a classic rock-leaning classic hits format outside of these times.

== Anniversaries ==
On July 31, 2018, WHTC celebrated its 70th anniversary by renaming the building the Juke Van Oss Building. Approximately 100 guests attended this special event broadcast live between 9:30 and 12 noon.

WHTC celebrated 60 years of the Talk of the Town program on November 19, 2019. The show included interviews with the program's creator Bill Gargano and many highlights of past broadcasts.
