= WYVN =

- Saugatuck, Michigan; United States
- Broadcast area: Holland, Michigan
- Frequency: 92.7 MHz
- Branding: 92.7 The Van

Programming
- Format: Classic hits

Ownership
- Owner: Midwest Communications; (Midwest Communications, Inc.)
- Sister stations: WHTC

History
- First air date: 1987
- Former call signs: WEVS (4/30/87-3/29/01)
- Call sign meaning: The The Van

Technical information
- Licensing authority: FCC
- Facility ID: 13676
- Class: A
- ERP: 3,300 watts
- HAAT: 114 meters
- Transmitter coordinates: 42.686°N 86.168°W

Links
- Public license information: Public file; LMS
- Webcast: Listen Live
- Website: 927thevan.com

WYVN (92.7 FM, "The Van") is a radio station broadcasting a classic hits format licensed to Saugatuck, Michigan, with studios in Holland, Michigan, and is owned along with WHTC by Midwest Communications.

The station began operations on July 4, 1987 as WEVS. WEVS' music format consisted of a hybrid of rock and pop oldies dating back to the 1950s and current adult contemporary chart hits. During this time, the station was known as "The Lakeshore's Music Station," playing "Your Favorites of Five Decades."

In January 2001 Midwest Communications, owner of longtime AM station WHTC, began operating WEVS under a local marketing agreement. On April 9, 2001, after a weekend of stunting with a reading of last names from the Holland telephone directory beginning with "Van," WEVS relaunched as Holland's Classic Hits 92 7 The Van and with the new call letters of WYVN. Midwest Communications bought the station outright in October.

In early October 2007, Michiguide.com reported that WYVN had adjusted its playlist from classic hits to oldies/classic hits. The station moved back to a rock-based classic hits approach on December 30, 2008.

The Lakeshore's Morning Wake Up Call with Brent Alan debuted in March 2014. Alan is the former program director of WHTC and serves as program director of The Van. The remainder of the broadcast day is satellite-fed from Westwood One. The station streams its programming 24 hours a day on its website and multiple other platforms.

== Alegria Latina ==
In July 2009 the Hispanic program Alegria Latina, which had originated on sister station WHTC in 1964, moved to The Van where it now airs on Sundays from 7 pm to 12 midnight. After 57 years of hosting the show Lu Reyes, who originated the program on WHTC retired on December 12, 2021. Hosting duties are now shared by Jesse Martinez, Yeli Romero, Barbra Rubio, and Belinda Coronado.

== Hope College football and basketball ==
In August 2009 it was announced that 92 7 The Van would be the new home for Hope College Football and Basketball broadcasts with streaming available at www.927thevan.com. The games had previously been carried on WHTC since 1948.
