= WOZZ =

- Mosinee, Wisconsin; United States
- Broadcast area: Wausau, Wisconsin
- Frequency: 94.7 MHz
- Branding: 94.7/102.9 The Beast

Programming
- Format: Active rock

Ownership
- Owner: Midwest Communications; (WRIG, Inc.)
- Sister stations: WDEZ, WIFC, WRIG, WSAU, WSAU-FM

History
- First air date: August 15, 1991 (as WEHM)
- Former call signs: WEHM (8/1991-9/1991); WOFM (1991–2010)
- Call sign meaning: Though the calls can represent MOZZinee (Mosinee), they were moved from their original home in New London, WI, where they represented that station's "Land of OZ" AC format & branding

Technical information
- Licensing authority: FCC
- Facility ID: 43881
- Class: C2
- ERP: 50,000 watts
- HAAT: 150 meters
- Transmitter coordinates: 44°59′18.00″N 89°59′42.00″W
- Translator: 102.9 W275AC (Wausau)

Links
- Public license information: Public file; LMS
- Webcast: Listen Live
- Website: 947thebeast.com

WOZZ (94.7 FM, "94.7/102.9 The Beast") is an active rock radio station licensed to Mosinee, Wisconsin, serving the Wausau, Wisconsin, market. The station is owned and operated by Midwest Communications and operates at an ERP of 50,000 watts. The station simulcasts on translator W275AC (102.9 FM), licensed to Wausau.

== History ==
The station originally went on the air as WEHM on August 15, 1991, though it changed its call sign to WOFM exactly one month later on September 15. The station has had a long history of oldies formats, including spending most of the 1990s as a standalone oldies station ("Oldies 94.7"). In the late 1990s-early 2000s, it began simulcasting with its sister station WIZD (99.9 FM) under the name "The Oldies Station;" this was done to allow the entire Wausau-Stevens Point radio market to be linked with one oldies station. In 2004, WIZD and WOFM, adopted the "Cool FM" moniker while still retaining the oldies format.

In August 2005, WIZD and WOFM separated. WIZD became simply "99.9 WIZD", and heavily targeted the Plover and Stevens Point area in which the station is local to. WOFM continued using the "Cool FM" name with Westwood One's oldies channel and chopped up jingle packages from both the "Cool FM" and the "Oldies 94.7" days.

In October 2005, it was announced that WOFM would switch to a rhythmic CHR format as "Wild 94.7." That format was short-lived, however, and on March 6, 2006, the station adopted Midwest Communications' "Guaranteed Music Variety" format, originally under "The Peak" branding and later branded as "The Valley", with a playlist of classic hits from the 1960s, 1970s, and 1980s. Between September 2006 and September 2009, sister station WIZD would rejoin WOFM in a "Valley" simulcast. (WIZD now simulcasts the talk format of WSAU as WSAU-FM.)

On September 13, 2010, WOFM changed its call sign to WOZZ; ten days later, on September 23 at 5 p.m., after Phil Collins' "In the Air Tonight" finished playing, the station adopted a Classic rock format as "Rock 94.7," with Nirvana's "Smells Like Teen Spirit" being the first song played. "Rock 94.7" concentrates on mainstream rock from the 1970s, 1980s, and 1990s; this format had recently been adopted on Midwest Communication-owned sister stations in Duluth (on KDAL-FM) and Appleton/Green Bay (on WRQE, which previously had the WOZZ call sign). By March 2011, "Rock 94.7" tweaked to a full blown mainstream rock format playing a mix of classic rock and rock from the 1970s, 1980s, 1990s, 2000s, to current active rock music, competing between classic rock-formatted WGLX and active rock-formatted WMZK. As of September 2011, the station moved into a full-blown active rock position, playing the latest from Five Finger Death Punch, Pop Evil, Seether, and other active rock artists. "Rock 94.7" also added a Metal show to their lineup; "Scary Terry's Saturday Nightmare" was heard Saturday nights at 9 p.m., and featured a mix of 1980s, 1990s, 2000s and current trash/death/heavy metal, hosted by WOZZ program director/afternoon host "Scary" Terry Stephens. The "Rock 94.7" lineup included the nationally syndicated Free Beer and Hot Wings Show during morning drive time. "Free Beer and Hot Wings" were dropped from the station on March 1, 2013, due to poor ratings and listener demand for more music in the morning.

On September 8, 2021, WOZZ flipped to adult hits under the "Jack FM" brand.

On July 25, 2024, WOZZ flipped back to mainstream rock, branded as "94.7/102.9 The Beast". The format launched jockless, but it was concurrently announced that "Scary Terry" Stephens would return to the afternoon shift with the flip, simulcasting from his new home station at Lansing, MI station WJXQ.

== Awards ==
WOZZ has become one of the most award-winning Rock Stations in the Midwest. The station won three Awards for Excellence from the Wisconsin Broadcasters Association in 2012. In 2013, WOZZ won two national awards from the Radio Contraband Rock Radio Awards for Station of the Year, and Program/Music Director of the year. Greg Atoms, who uses the on air name "Lunchbox" was also a finalist for Best DJ in America at the Rock Radio Awards.

For the year of 2013, WOZZ won the Wisconsin Broadcasters Association Station of the Year for Medium Market Music Radio. Beating out stations in Green Bay/Appleton, La Crosse, Eau Claire, Wausau/Stevens Point, and Sheboygan.

== Translators ==
In addition to the main station, WOZZ is relayed by an additional translator to widen its broadcast area.

Broadcast translator for WOZZ
| Call sign | Frequency | City of license | FID | ERP (W) | Class | FCC info |
|---|---|---|---|---|---|---|
| W275AC | 102.9 FM | Wausau, Wisconsin | 43882 | 250 | D | LMS |
