= KGLL =

- Gillette, Wyoming; United States
- Broadcast area: Gillette, Wyoming
- Frequency: 88.1 MHz
- Branding: Real Presence Radio

Programming
- Format: Catholic
- Affiliations: Real Presence Radio

Ownership
- Owner: Real Presence Radio

History
- First air date: 2010

Technical information
- Licensing authority: FCC
- Facility ID: 122432
- Class: A
- ERP: 200 watts
- HAAT: 85 meters (279 ft)
- Transmitter coordinates: 44°13′50″N 105°27′49″W

Links
- Public license information: Public file; LMS
- Website: https://yourcatholicradiostation.com/

KGLL (88.1 MHz) is a radio station licensed to Gillette, Wyoming, broadcasting a Catholic talk format, and is an owned and operated affiliate of Real Presence Radio.

== History ==
KGLL began broadcasting in 2010. It was originally owned by American Family Association, and was an affiliate of American Family Radio's AFR Talk network. Effective May 21, 2018, the station was sold to Real Presence Radio for $50,000.
