= WSAU (AM) =

- Wausau, Wisconsin; United States
- Frequency: 550 kHz
- Branding: 550 & 99.9 WSAU

Programming
- Format: Talk Radio
- Network: Fox News Radio
- Affiliations: Compass Media Networks; Genesis Communications Network; Premiere Networks; Westwood One; Packers Radio Network; Milwaukee Brewers Radio Network; Milwaukee Bucks; Wisconsin Badgers

Ownership
- Owner: Midwest Communications; (WRIG, Inc.)
- Sister stations: WDEZ; WIFC; WOZZ; WRIG; WSAU-FM

History
- First air date: August 8, 1948
- Former call signs: WLIN (1947–1952); WOSA (1952–1958)
- Call sign meaning: "Wausau"

Technical information
- Licensing authority: FCC
- Facility ID: 41902
- Class: B
- Power: 15,000 watts day; 20,000 watts night
- Transmitter coordinates: 44°51′26″N 89°35′13″W
- Translator: 95.1 W236CO (Marshfield)
- Repeater: 99.9 WSAU-FM (Rudolph)

Links
- Public license information: Public file; LMS
- Webcast: Listen live
- Website: wsau.com

WSAU (550 kHz) is an AM radio station broadcasting a conservative talk radio format. It is licensed to Wausau, Wisconsin, and is simulcast on WSAU-FM at 99.9 MHz in Stevens Point (licensed to Rudolph) and on FM translator W236CO in Marshfield at 95.1. It is owned by Wausau-based Midwest Communications, with studios on Scott Street.

WSAU is a Class B AM station. It is powered at 15,000 watts by day and 20,000 watts at night, using a directional antenna with a four-tower array. The AM transmitter is along County Highway X in Kronenwetter, Wisconsin.

The station started as WLIN in Merrill, Wisconsin, in 1948, preceded the year before by an FM station (now WIFC). It was owned by United States Representative Alvin E. O'Konski. It moved to Wausau in 1952 as that city's second radio station. WSAU, then at 1400 AM, acquired the 550 frequency in 1958 in a facility upgrade. Midwest has owned WSAU since 1996.

== Programming ==
Weekdays begin with a two-hour local show, WSAU Wisconsin Morning News hosted by Meg Ellefson and Chris Conley. Ellfson stays on for a phone-in show in late mornings. The rest of the weekday schedule is nationally syndicated talk programs: Markley, Van Camp, and Robbins, The Sean Hannity Show, The Mark Levin Show, The Joe Pags Show, Ground Zero with Clyde Lewis, Coast to Coast AM with George Noory and America in the Morning.

Weekends features specialty shows, including The WSAU Polka Party, At Home with Gary Sullivan, Our American Stories with Lee Habeeb, The Weekend with Michael Brown, Somewhere in Time with Art Bell, Sunday Nights with Bill Cunningham and Markley, Van Camp, and Robbins. Most hours begin with an update from Fox News Radio.

WSAU is Wausau's radio home for Milwaukee Brewers baseball, Green Bay Packers football, Milwaukee Bucks basketball and University of Wisconsin Badgers football, Men's hockey, and basketball.

== History ==
=== Establishment in Merrill as WLIN ===
Alvin E. O'Konski applied to the Federal Communications Commission (FCC) on February 3, 1947, to build a new radio station in Merrill, Wisconsin. At the time, O'Konski was a sitting United States representative; another member of Wisconsin's Congressional delegation, Joseph McCarthy, introduced a bill months later proposing to bar members of Congress or their spouses from owning radio stations. McCarthy claimed not to have knowledge of the O'Konski applications for AM and FM stations at Merrill, while O'Konski told a reporter that it was "honorable and legal" for a lawmaker to own a station. The application was amended that November to switch from a 500-watt station with unlimited time on 1230 kHz to a 1,000-watt, daytime-only station at 730 kHz, and it was granted on June 16, 1948; construction was quickly completed, and the station was reported on air by August 8. The FM application had already been granted and went on the air as WLIN-FM 100.7 on a limited basis. However, its operation was pockmarked with technical difficulties; equipment that was shipped to Merrill arrived damaged and several sections of transmission line needed replacement.

O'Konski applied in 1949 to change frequencies to 550 kHz and add nighttime operation; the FCC approved on March 13, 1950. By this time, O'Konski was expanding his broadcasting holdings. He applied for a station in Menominee, Michigan, but another group also applied for the frequency. Further, troubles were mounting. A syndicated column by Drew Pearson noted that one man on O'Konski's congressional payroll actually worked at WLIN, while O'Konski was sued for $17,700 in unpaid transcribed programs used by WLIN; this legal action was settled.

=== Move to Wausau as WOSA ===
In 1951, O'Konski applied for a second increase to 5,000 watts, and he amended this application in February 1952 to move the station from Merrill to Wausau. Doubts were raised at the time over whether this would be approved. Wausau already had one station, WSAU (1400 AM), and a construction permit had been issued to build another, WHVF. However, the FCC granted the construction permit to make the move on December 4, 1952; the call sign was changed from WLIN to WOSA on December 15. O'Konski announced program production would be split between Wausau and Merrill. The Merrill studio at this time also served as O'Konski's congressional office: Congress paid O'Konski $900 a year in rent for the space, something he asserted to be a common practice.

The Wausau transmitter site was phased into use in May 1953; the station retained its affiliation with the Mutual Broadcasting System. O'Konski also began exploratory work on a possible television station application, filing for VHF channel 7 at the start of April. WSAU radio, a consortium of newspapers known as the Wisconsin Valley Television Corporation, and WOSA were the three groups seeking the channel. However, seeking to avoid a lengthy comparative hearing, O'Konski amended his application to UHF channel 16, which was granted in February 1954. However, 10 months later, O'Konski abandoned the permit for WOSA-TV and returned it to the FCC.

WOSA would not have studios in Wausau until February 1955, when it opened a facility in the Thorp Finance Building at Fourth and Scott streets. O'Konski also announced he would open a station at Stevens Point.

O'Konski made a second attempt to obtain WOSA-TV in 1957. He requested channel 9 be moved to Wausau from Iron Mountain, Michigan, a proposal accepted by the FCC.

=== WSAU moves to 550 ===
In January 1958, O'Konski reached an agreement with the Wisconsin Valley Television Company (which had merged with WSAU radio in 1953) to sell WOSA and WLIN for $225,000. Wisconsin Valley would retain the WOSA facility and move WSAU onto it, selling off the 250-watt station at 1400 kHz. A buyer was found in May: Duey Wright, the owner of a music store and school of music in Wausau, who would take over the 1400 frequency using the call sign WRIG and set up studios above the music store.

On August 1, 1958, the realignment of radio frequencies portended by the sale became reality. WSAU and its programming moved from 1400 to 550 kHz, incorporating selected WOSA programs, and WRIG debuted at 1400. WLIN became WSAU-FM and then WIFC in 1969. Wausau-based Wisconsin Valley continued to operate under that name until December 1966, when it renamed itself Forward Communications in view of its ownership of KCAU-TV in Sioux City, Iowa.

Forward sold off WSAU and WIFC radio in 1980 to Mid-West Media, a company owned by the stations' general manager, Dave "Raven" Ewaskowitz, and two members of a local insurance company; by this time, WSAU was a full-service station featuring adult contemporary music and information. In announcing the sale, Forward noted policies that discouraged cross-ownership of radio and television stations. The radio station retained the WSAU call sign, and the television station became WSAW-TV. The sale closed in April 1981. The radio stations remained in the same building with WSAW-TV until relocating in 1983.

=== Journal and Midwest ownership ===
In 1985, Ewaskowitz opted to sell Mid-West Media for approximately $3.5 million to Journal Broadcast Group, the media subsidiary of The Milwaukee Journal. The Journal had owned WSAU on 1400 kHz from 1947 to 1951.

Journal sold the pair for $3.5 million in 1996 to Midwest Communications, owned by the Wright family—which had started in radio by buying the former WSAU frequency 38 years prior. At the time, WSAU broadcast a mix of news/talk programming and oldies.

In 2009, Midwest began simulcasting the station in the Stevens Point area on WSAU-FM 99.9, the former WIZD. It acquired a translator licensed to Marshfield in 2014 to provide an FM signal in the immediate Wausau area.
