= KQSF =

- Sioux Falls, South Dakota; United States
- Broadcast area: Sioux Falls metropolitan area
- Frequency: 101.9 MHz
- Branding: Q101.9

Programming
- Format: Hot adult contemporary
- Affiliations: AP Radio; Premiere Networks

Ownership
- Owner: Midwest Communications; (Midwest Communications, Inc.)
- Sister stations: KELO; KELO-FM; KELQ; KRRO; KTWB; KWSN

History
- First air date: May 3, 1990
- Former call signs: KTWB (1990–2013); KELO-FM (2013–2026)
- Call sign meaning: "Q Sioux Falls"

Technical information
- Licensing authority: FCC
- Facility ID: 34950
- Class: C2
- ERP: 34,000 watts
- HAAT: 177 meters (581 ft)
- Transmitter coordinates: 43°45′4.9″N 96°53′23.1″W

Links
- Public license information: Public file; LMS
- Webcast: Listen live
- Website: q1019fm.com

KQSF (101.9 MHz) is a radio station in Sioux Falls, South Dakota, airing a hot adult contemporary music format. The station is owned by Midwest Communications. Its studios are located on South Phillips Avenue in Sioux Falls, while its transmitter is located near Colton.

== History ==
The station signed on the air on May 5, 1990, as KTWB, and aired a country music format. Initially owned by Lee Axdahl, it would later be sold to Midcontinent Broadcasting.

=== Backyard Broadcasting ===
After a 52-year history in Sioux Falls radio, Midcontinent sold all of its stations, including KTWB, to Backyard Broadcasting of Baltimore in 2004. It marked the company's exit from broadcasting, after selling KELO-TV in 1996.

=== Midwest Communications ===
Backyard sold its seven Sioux Falls stations in 2012 to their present owner, Midwest Communications, in a $13.35 million transaction.

On October 28, 2013, KTWB and the country format moved to 92.5 FM, swapping frequencies with KELO-FM and its adult contemporary format.

By April 2025, KELO-FM had evolved to a hot adult contemporary format; this allowed sister station KQSF to move from a contemporary hit radio (CHR) format to adult contemporary when Westwood One (which supplied both formats to KQSF) eliminated its "Hits Now!" network. On October 31, 2025, Midwest announced that KQSF would take on KELO-FM's format and branding on November 3, coinciding with the start of KELO-FM's annual Christmas music programming; the "Q" branding concurrently moved to 101.9, while maintaining a hot AC format. The two stations swapped call signs on January 14, 2026.
