= WSAU-FM =

Simulcast of WSAU, Wausau
- Rudolph, Wisconsin; United States
- Broadcast area: Stevens Point-Wisconsin Rapids
- Frequency: 99.9 MHz
- Branding: 550 & 99.9 WSAU

Programming
- Format: News/talk
- Affiliations: Fox News Radio; Compass Media Networks; Genesis Communications Network; Premiere Networks; Westwood One; Packers Radio Network; Milwaukee Brewers Radio Network

Ownership
- Owner: Duey E. Wright; (WRIG, Inc.)
- Sister stations: WDEZ; WIFC; WOZZ; WRIG; WSAU

History
- First air date: September 30, 1990 (as WIZD)
- Former call signs: WIZD (1989–2009)
- Call sign meaning: Wausau (location of WSAU)

Technical information
- Licensing authority: FCC
- Facility ID: 73119
- Class: C3
- ERP: 13,000 watts
- HAAT: 138 meters (453 ft)
- Transmitter coordinates: 44°20′19″N 89°38′55″W

Links
- Public license information: Public file; LMS
- Webcast: Listen live
- Website: wsau.com

WSAU-FM (99.9 MHz) is a radio station broadcasting a news/talk format, simulcasting WSAU in Wausau. Licensed to Rudolph, Wisconsin, United States, the station serves the Stevens Point-Wisconsin Rapids area. The station is owned by Midwest Communications. WSAU derives a large amount of its programming from nationally syndicated conservative talk radio shows; it also broadcasts sports, such as from the Packers Radio Network.

== History ==
WSAU-FM was previously known as WIZD and had a history of simulcasting WOFM in Wausau under various oldies, classic hits and adult contemporary formats since the 1990s. On September 9, 2009, at 5AM, WIZD dropped the WOFM simulcast (doing so in the middle of the song "Burning Down the House" by Talking Heads) and began simulcasting sister news station WSAU (AM) under new calls WSAU-FM.

== History of call letters ==
The call letters WSAU-FM were previously assigned to a Wausau station (now WIFC) that began broadcasting August 29, 1948. It broadcast on 95.5 MHz and was licensed to The Milwaukee Journal.
