= KFGO-FM =

Coordinates: 47.054°N 97.413°W

Simulcast of KFGO, Fargo, ND
- Hope, North Dakota; United States
- Broadcast area: Fargo-Moorhead
- Frequency: 104.7 MHz
- Branding: The Mighty 790 and 104.7 FM KFGO

Programming
- Format: Talk radio
- Affiliations: ABC News Radio; NBC News Radio; Compass Media Networks; Premiere Networks; Westwood One

Ownership
- Owner: Midwest Communications; (Midwest Communications, Inc.)
- Sister stations: KFGO; KRWK; KNFL; KOYY

History
- First air date: October 2002
- Former call signs: KCHY (2000–2002, CP); KDAM (2002–2007); KMXW (2007); KMJO (2007–2021)
- Call sign meaning: Fargo

Technical information
- Licensing authority: FCC
- Facility ID: 88502
- Class: C1
- ERP: 100,000 watts
- HAAT: 214 meters (702 ft)

Links
- Public license information: Public file; LMS
- Webcast: Listen live
- Website: kfgo.com

KFGO-FM (104.7 FM) is a radio station broadcasting a talk format, simulcasting KFGO (790 AM). Licensed to Hope, North Dakota, it serves the Fargo-Moorhead metropolitan area. It first began broadcasting in 2002 under the call sign KDAM.

The station is owned by Midwest Communications. The offices and studios are located at 1020 S. 25th Street in Fargo, while its transmitter is located near Erie.

== History ==
=== 104.7 The Dam ===
A construction permit (CP) was granted in 2000 by the Federal Communications Commission (FCC) with the call sign KCHY, broadcasting 200 watts covering Hope, North Dakota. Clear Channel Communications paid $800,000 for the CP for KCHY in 2002, and changed the call sign to KDAM.

KDAM signed on with 100,000 watts in October 2002, stunting with clips of songs of all genres, billing itself as "Quick 104.7", and playing ten songs per minute while other stations play ten songs per hour. The modern rock format known as "The Dam 104.7" debuted days later. It became popular, and gained larger Arbitron ratings than rival heritage active rock station KQWB-FM at times. Despite a rimshot signal, "The Dam" also attracted more than 2% of radio listeners in the Grand Forks market, somewhat cannibalizing by competing with co-owned sister active rock station KJKJ ("KJ108").

=== 104.7 The Wolf ===
KDAM began stunting as "Quick 104.7" again, and later flipped to a country music format as "104.7 The Wolf" in December 2005, competing with KVOX-FM "Froggy 99.9". The format flip caused controversy with listeners, and several online petitions were created to bring The Dam back. The Wolf was not as successful as "The Dam", and attracted less than 1% of listeners in the Fargo-Moorhead Arbitron radio market.

On September 28, 2006, it was announced that KDAM and the other Clear Channel stations in Fargo were being sold to Radio Fargo-Moorhead, Inc., a company owned by Fargo native James Ingstad. Ingstad had previously sold his stations in 2000, before KDAM went on the air. The sale was approved by the FCC on January 19, 2007.

=== Mix 104.7 ===
On February 26, 2007, KDAM began stunting with an adult hits format as "Ed FM", with talk show host and longtime Fargo-Moorhead radio host Ed Schultz featured in the logo on the station's website. The station changed its call sign to KMXW and became an adult contemporary station as "Mix 104.7" on March 1, 2007, competing with Triad Broadcasting's hot AC station KLTA ("FM 105.1").

=== Mojo 104.7 ===
The station began airing Christmas music as a stunt on November 9, 2007, along with KEGK. On November 26, 2007, the station changed to an oldies/classic hits format with the name "Mojo 104.7", and changed its call sign to KMJO. Starting in April 2010, Mojo added more 1980s music to its playlist.

=== 104.7 Popster FM ===
On September 12, 2010, at 9 p.m., KMJO flipped to adult hits as "104.7 Popster FM"; the first song on "Popster" was "Pop Life" by Prince and the Revolution. On April 30, 2013, Ingstad's Fargo-Moorhead cluster, which included KMJO and sister stations KBVB, KFGO, KRWK, KVOX, and WDAY-FM, was sold to Midwest Communications.

=== 104.7 Mix FM ===
On September 10, 2013, at 4 p.m., after playing "Like A Prayer" by Madonna, KMJO flipped to adult contemporary as "104.7 Mix FM"; the first song on "Mix" was "3 A.M." by Matchbox Twenty.

=== 104.7 Duke FM ===
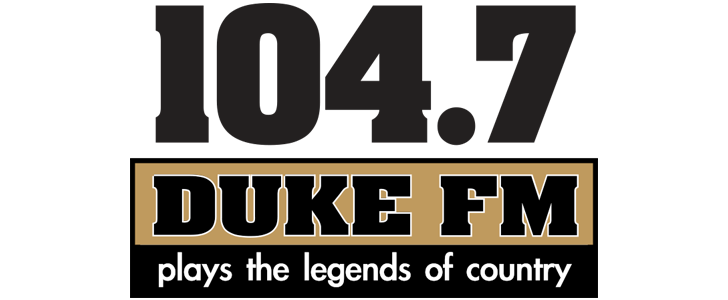
"Duke FM" logo (2015–2021)

On July 22, 2015, KMJO abruptly flipped to classic country as "104.7 Duke FM"; simultaneously, the AC format was moved to KRWK.

=== KFGO-FM ===
On January 18, 2021, at 8 a.m., after playing "Goodbye's All We've Got Left" by Steve Earle, KMJO flipped to classic rock as "104.7 The Bear". The first song on "The Bear" was "A Day in the Life" by The Beatles, the first song alphabetically in a run of the entire playlist by letter to launch the station. This format, however, would turn out to be temporary; on January 26, KMJO flipped to a simulcast of KFGO (790 AM). The KFGO-FM call letters, which were previously assigned to its sister station 101.9 FM in the 1980s, would be adopted on February 1, 2021.
