= WZUU =

Coordinates: 42.255°N 85.683°W

- Mattawan, Michigan; United States
- Broadcast area
- Frequency: 92.5 MHz
- Branding: Rock 92.5 The ZUU [Zoo]

Programming
- Format: active rock
- Affiliations: Westwood One

Ownership
- Owner: Midwest Communications

History
- First air date: 1990 (as WKGH at 92.3)
- Former call signs: WNTX (3/29/95-5/1/97); WKGH (1/9/90-3/29/95)
- Former frequencies: 92.3 MHz (1990–2007)
- Call sign meaning: W KalamaZUU

Technical information
- Licensing authority: FCC
- Facility ID: 42034
- Class: A
- ERP: 6,000 watts
- HAAT: 98 meters

Links
- Public license information: Public file; LMS
- Webcast: Listen Live
- Website: wzuu.com

WZUU (92.5 FM, "The ZUU [Zoo]") is a radio station broadcasting a mainstream rock format. Licensed to Mattawan, Michigan, it first began broadcasting in 1990 under the WKGH call sign. During the first few years of the radio station, it broadcast oldies from a satellite feed.

On Memorial Day 1995, the station began to broadcast an alternative and modern rock-styled format.

Previous logo

By late May 1997, the format was modified into a mainstream rock presentation, and the call letters were changed from WNTX to WZUU, along with a new slogan, "The Zuu".

In January 2007, the station changed frequency from 92.3 to 92.5 and increased its power from 860 watts to 6000 watts.

In October 2025, the format was tweaked towards an active rock style, removing some of the older classic rock and adding songs from the 1990s through the present.

== Bronco Radio Network ==
Prior to relocating it was an affiliate of the "Bronco Radio Network" for Western Michigan University. From the fall of 2007 to spring of 2010, it was the flagship station for Broncos football and men's basketball.
