= KELO-FM =

Adult contemporary radio station in Dell Rapids–Sioux Falls, South Dakota

Coordinates: 43.763°N 96.808°W

- Dell Rapids, South Dakota; United States
- Broadcast area: Sioux Falls, South Dakota
- Frequency: 95.7 MHz
- Branding: 95.7 KELO-FM

Programming
- Format: Adult contemporary

Ownership
- Owner: Midwest Communications; (Midwest Communications, Inc.)
- Sister stations: KELO; KELQ; KQSF; KRRO; KTWB; KWSN

History
- First air date: 1998
- Former call signs: KSOB (1998–2001); KSQB-FM (2001–2013); KQSF (2013–2026)
- Call sign meaning: from sister station KELO (AM)

Technical information
- Licensing authority: FCC
- Facility ID: 76903
- Class: C3
- ERP: 25,000 watts
- HAAT: 100 meters (330 ft)

Links
- Public license information: Public file; LMS
- Webcast: Listen live
- Website: kelofm.com

KELO-FM (95.7 FM, "95.7 KELO-FM") is an adult contemporary radio station licensed to Dell Rapids, South Dakota; it serves the Sioux Falls, South Dakota area. It first began broadcasting in 1998, under the call sign KSOB. The station is owned by Midwest Communications.

Its studios are located on South Phillips Avenue in Sioux Falls, while its transmitter is located near Baltic.

== History ==
The station signed on in 1998, as KSOB with an oldies format as "Q Gold 95.7" owned by LA Media, and later changed to the KSQB-FM call sign in 2001. KSQB was also owned by Feller Broadcasting, made up of a partnership of brothers Rob and Nick Feller. KSQB gradually tweaked to an adult contemporary format, and dropped the "Gold" from its moniker by April 1, 2004. Backyard Broadcasting acquired the station later in September 2006. With the growth of the adult hits format in 2005, Q95.7 gradually shifted to adult hits, and began reporting with the format to Arbitron by 2006.

The station was staffed by The Cartwright Brothers Morning Show and Big Scott Allen. Big Scott was also the program director of the station.

On November 1, 2012, Midwest Communications acquired KSQB-FM and its six sister stations from Backyard Broadcasting at a purchase price of $13.35 million.

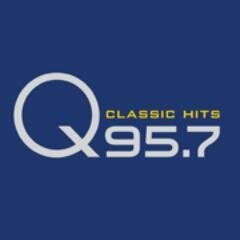
Logo for the classic hits version of "Q95.7"

On March 1, 2013, KSQB-FM changed its call letters to KQSF and became a classic hits station as "Kool 95.7"; the new format served as a merger of KSQB's adult hits format with the former oldies format of KXQL "Kool 107.9", which was concurrently replaced with a simulcast of KELO (1320 AM) as KELQ. By 2014, KQSF had rebranded back to "Q95-7".

On September 13, 2018, at 9 a.m., after stunting with poetic readings of various song lyrics, KQSF flipped to Top 40/CHR, keeping the "Q95.7" name, to compete against the more established CHR station KKLS-FM "Hot 104.7".

On April 14, 2025, at 10 a.m., KQSF shifted back to adult contemporary. The shift was prompted by the discontinuation of Westwood One's "Hits Now!" network, and followed a gradual evolution of sister station KELO-FM's own adult contemporary format to hot adult contemporary; KQSF's CHR format had also maintained lower ratings than KKLS-FM.

On October 31, 2025, Midwest announced that 95.7 would take on the adult contemporary format and branding of KELO-FM on November 3, coinciding with the start of KELO-FM's annual Christmas music programming; the adult contemporary playlist returned on December 26. The "Q" branding concurrently moved to 101.9 with a revived version of the CHR format, and the stations swapped call signs on January 14, 2026. The 95.7 facility is the third to use the KELO-FM call sign, which had been on 92.5 until 2013.
