= Midwest Communications =

American radio broadcasting company

Midwest Communications, Inc.
- Type: Private
- Industry: Radio broadcasting
- Founded: 1958; 68 years ago
- Headquarters: Wausau, Wisconsin
- Owner: Wright Family
- Website: www.mwcradio.com

Midwest Communications, Inc. is an American radio broadcasting company based in Wausau, Wisconsin. It owns 82 radio stations located primarily within the Midwest United States, in Indiana, Michigan, Minnesota, North Dakota, South Dakota, Tennessee, Illinois and Wisconsin. The company is a family-owned business and is headed by the Wright family.

== History ==
=== 1950s-1960s ===
Midwest Communications began in Wausau, Wisconsin, with WRIG, Inc. and the acquisition by the Duey E. Wright family of a 1400 kHz, 250-watt AM facility from the Wisconsin Valley Television Corporation. The call letters WRIG (for Wright) were assigned and on August 1, 1958, top forty-formatted WRIG signed on the air. Power was increased to 1,000 watts in 1961 and WRIG-FM (now WDEZ) signed on in 1964.

=== 1970s ===
Midwest started station WROE in Appleton/Oshkosh, Wisconsin in 1971. Founder Duey E. Wright Sr. died at 75 on November 24, 1971, with Duey E. Wright Jr. taking over the company his father founded. In 1975, Midwest purchased WBAY-AM and FM, Green Bay, Wisconsin. Due to Federal Communications Commission (FCC) rules at that time, WROE was sold. The Green Bay call letters were changed to WGEE-AM (now WTAQ-AM), and WIXX-FM. The 1980s saw the acquisition by Midwest of KIOA/KMGK, Des Moines, Iowa, WKKQ/WTBX, Hibbing, Minnesota and KLMS/KFMQ, Lincoln, Nebraska. In addition, WRIG moved to 1390 kHz and increased power to 5000 watts day and night.

=== 1990s ===
The Telecommunications Act of 1996 allowed Midwest to consolidate the Green Bay-Appleton/Oshkosh and Wausau-Stevens Point markets. The consolidation brought about the sale of the Des Moines, Lincoln and Hibbing stations and the acquisitions of WROE, WOZZ, WLTM (now WZBY), WNCY and WNFL in Green Bay-Appleton/Oshkosh and WSAU, WIFC, WOFM and WIZD in Wausau-Stevens Point. In addition four stations WTVB, WNWN AM/FM and WFAT were acquired in the Kalamazoo-Battle Creek, Michigan market.

=== 2000s ===
In the beginning of the 2000s, Midwest acquired WHBL, WWJR (now WHBZ) and WBFM IN Sheboygan, Wisconsin and WHTC and WEVS (now WYVN) in Holland, Michigan, as well as, the Duluth Minnesota/Superior Wisconsin market stations KDAL AM/FM, KRBR, WDSM, KTCO, and KXTP (now WGEE).

On June 30, 2004, Midwest Communications, Inc. acquired an additional six stations in the Hibbing Minnesota market, WNMT, WMFG AM/FM, KMFG, WTBX, and WUSZ.

On June 14, 2005, Midwest Communications, Inc. acquired WMGI and WWSY in Terre Haute, Indiana, and on December 16, 2005, added WACF and WPRS licensed to Paris, IL, to the Terre Haute, Indiana market.

On January 6, 2006, Midwest Communications, Inc. expanded in the Sheboygan, Wisconsin market with the addition of WXER.

On May 1, 2006, Midwest Communications, Inc. acquired three additional properties in the Kalamazoo, Michigan market, WKZO, WQLR (now WVFM), and WQSN (now WQLR).

=== 2010s ===
The company continued to grow when Midwest Communications added stations in the Lansing market. 94.1 FM WVIC, 106.1 FM WJXQ, 92.1 FM WQTX, and 92.9 FM WLMI joined the Midwest Communications family in July 2010.

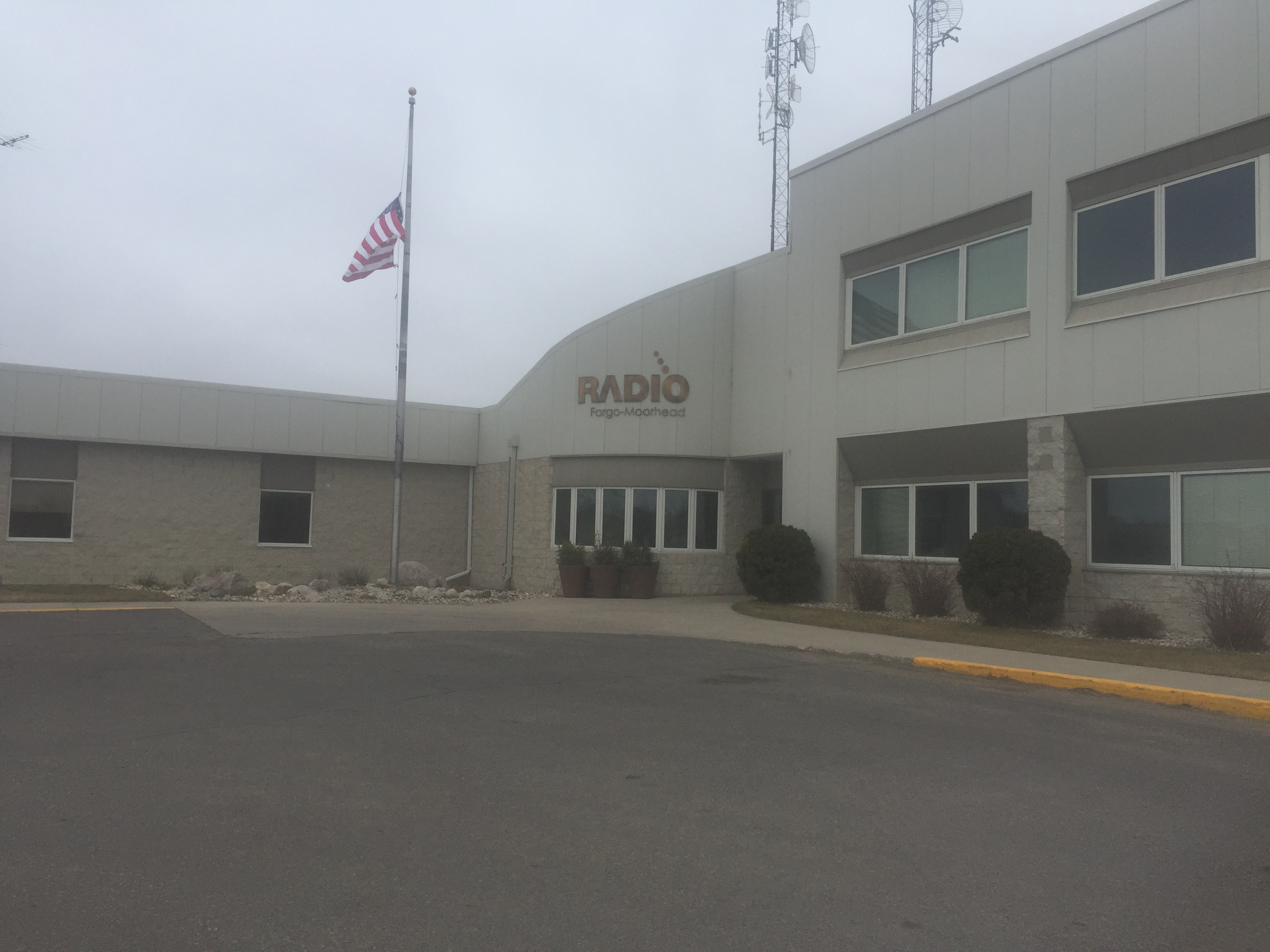
Midwest Communication Fargo Location

On November 1, 2012, Midwest Communications acquired six additional radio stations in Sioux Falls, South Dakota. Those stations included 103.7 FM KRRO, 95.7 FM KQSF, 92.5 FM KTWB, 101.9 FM KELO-FM, 1320 AM KELO-AM and 1230 AM KWSN.

May 1, 2013 saw the acquisition of six more radio properties in Fargo, North Dakota. 101.9 FM KRWK, 104.7 FM KMJO, 93.7 FM WDAY, 740 AM KVOX, 99.9 FM KVOX and 790 AM KFGO “The Mighty 790”.

On September 1, 2014, Midwest Communications expanded to three new markets with the acquisition of stations in the Nashville, Tennessee, Knoxville, Tennessee, and Evansville, Indiana markets. In this acquisition Midwest added nine more radio properties. In Nashville, Tennessee, Midwest acquired 96.3 FM WCJK and 92.9 FM WJXA. In Knoxville, Tennessee, 103.5 FM WIMZ, 97.5 FM WJXB, and 95.7 FM WVRX. The Evansville, Indiana stations include 93.5 FM WLFW, 107.5 FM WABX, 96.1 FM WSTO, and 104.1 FM WIKY.

On December 30, 2016, Midwest sold Hibbing, Minnesota-based KMFG to Refuge Media Group. On December 31, 2016, Midwest acquired KAOD, KGPZ, KQDS-FM, WEVE-FM, and WXXZ in the Duluth and Hibbing markets from Red Rock Broadcasting.

Effective September 22, 2017, Midwest sold WXXZ and KAOD to Aurora Broadcasting, L.L.C.

=== 2020s ===
In December, 2022, Midwest Communications' founder and President, Duke (Duey) Wright passes away. Executive Vice President, Peter Tanz, who joined the company in 1985, was named President.

On July 6, 2023, Midwest surrendered the license for WIBU in the Terre Haute, Indiana market to the FCC; the FCC cancelled the station's license on August 22.

On February 4, 2025, Midwest purchases WQXC and WZUU from Forum Communications, Otsego, Michigan. The 2 stations are added to the company's Kalamazoo, Michigan market.

In January 2026, Midwest returns the license of WIBQ, Terre Haute, Indiana to the F.C.C. and moves translator W250BZ to a simulcast of WTHI-HD2. The company also replaced WIBQ's news-talk format with an Oldies music format.

In March 2026, it was announced that Midwest would enter in the Rhinelander, Wisconsin market as well as expand in Wausau by acquiring ten stations and two transactions from NRG Media.

On March 31, 2026 at 12:00 pm, CDT, WIRL AM 1290 Peoria, Illinois left the air ending 77 years of broadcasting.

== List of stations ==
=== Battle Creek, Michigan ===
- WNWN - 98.5 FM - Country music
- WFAT - 930 AM/102.7 FM - Oldies

=== Coldwater, Michigan ===
- WTVB - 1590 AM/95.5 FM Classic hits

=== Duluth, Minnesota ===
- KDAL - 610 AM/103.9 FM - News/talk
- KDAL-FM - 95.7 FM - Adult contemporary
- KDKE - 102.5 FM - Classic country
- KTCO - 98.9 FM - Country
- KQDS-FM - 94.9 FM - Classic rock
- WDSM - 710 AM - Sports radio
- WDUL - 970 AM/98.1 FM - Top 40

=== Evansville, Indiana ===
- WABX - 107.5 FM - Classic rock
- WIKY-FM - 104.1 FM - Adult contemporary
- WLYD - 93.5 FM - Country
- WSTO - 96.1 FM - CHR/Top 40

=== Fargo, North Dakota ===
- KFGO - 790 AM/94.1 FM - News/talk
- KFGO-FM - 104.7 FM - News/talk
- KNFL - 740 AM/107.3 FM - Sports
- KOYY - 93.7 FM - Top 40 (CHR)
- KRWK - 101.9 FM - Adult hits
- KVOX-FM - 99.9 FM - Country

=== Green Bay, Wisconsin ===
- WGEE - 93.5 FM/93.1 FM - Classic country
- WDKF - 1440 AM - Sports radio
- WIXX -101.1 FM - Top 40/CHR
- WNCY-FM - 100.3 FM/92.1 FM - Country
- WNFL - 99.7 FM - Sports radio
- WTAQ - 1360 AM - Conservative talk
- WTAQ-FM - 97.5 FM - News/talk
- WYDR - 94.3 FM - Adult hits

=== Hibbing, Minnesota ===
- WMFG - 1240 AM - Adult standards
- KQDX - 106.3 FM - Classic rock (KQDS-FM simulcast)
- KDAH - 650 AM - News/talk
- WTBX - 93.9 FM - Hot adult contemporary
- WDKE - 96.1 FM/98.3 FM/103.9 FM - Classic country
- WEVE-FM - 97.9 FM/92.1 FM - Adult contemporary
- WUSZ - 99.9 FM - Country

=== Holland, Michigan ===
- WHTC - 1450 AM/99.7 FM - News/talk
- WYVN - 92.7 FM - Classic hits

=== Kalamazoo, Michigan ===
- WKZO - 590 AM/106.9 FM - News/talk
- WZOX (AM) - 1660 AM/95.5 FM - Country simulcast WNWN-FM
- WVFM - 106.5 FM - Adult hits
- WTOU - 96.5 FM - Urban contemporary
- WZUU - 92.5 FM - Mainstream rock
- WQXC - 100.9 FM - Oldies

=== Knoxville, Tennessee ===
- WDKW - 95.7 FM - Classic country
- WIMZ-FM - 103.5 FM - Classic rock
- WJXB-FM - 97.5 FM/107.3 FM - Adult contemporary
- WNFZ - 94.3 FM - Adult hits

=== Lansing, Michigan ===
- WJXQ - 106.1 FM - Rock
- WWDK - 94.1 FM - Classic country
- WLMI - 92.9 FM - Classic hits
- WQTX - 92.1 FM - Rhythmic adult contemporary

=== Peoria, Illinois ===
- WIRL - 1290 AM/95.9 FM - Conservative talk (WIRL 1290 defunct as of March 31, 2026 but continues as W240DM at 95.9 FM)
- WKZF - 102.3 FM - Rhythmic classic hits
- WMBD - 1470 AM/100.3 FM - News/talk
- WSWT - 106.9 FM - Hot adult contemporary
- WPBG - 93.3 FM - Classic hits
- WXCL - 104.9 FM - Country

=== Nashville, Tennessee ===
- WCJK - 96.3 FM - Adult hits
- WJXA - 92.9 FM - Adult contemporary
- WNFN - 106.7 FM - Classic country

=== Sheboygan, Wisconsin ===
- WBFM - 93.7 FM - Country
- WHBL - 1330 AM/101.5 FM News/talk
- WHBZ - 106.5 FM - Active rock
- WXER - 104.5 FM/96.1 FM - Hot adult contemporary

=== Sioux Falls, South Dakota ===
- KELO - 1320 AM/105.1 FM - News/talk
- KELO-FM - 95.7 FM - Soft rock
- KELQ - 107.9 FM - News/talk
- KQSF - 101.9 FM - Top 40
- KRRO - 103.7 FM - Active rock
- KTWB - 92.5 FM - Country
- KWSN - 1230 AM/98.1 FM - Sports radio

=== Terre Haute, Indiana ===
- WBOW - 102.7 FM - Classic hits
- WMGI - 100.7 FM - Contemporary hit radio
- WTHI-FM - 99.9 FM - Country
- WWVR - 98.5 FM - Classic rock

=== Wausau, Wisconsin ===
- WDEZ - 101.9 FM - Country
- WIFC - 95.5 FM - Top 40/CHR
- WOZZ - 94.7 FM/102.9 FM - Mainstream rock
- WRIG - 1390 AM/93.9 FM - Sports radio
- WSAU - 550 AM/95.1 FM - Conservative talk
- WSAU-FM - 99.9 FM - Conservative talk

== Notable talent ==
- Joel Heitkamp - talk show host
