= KFGO (AM) =

- Fargo, North Dakota; United States
- Broadcast area: Fargo-Moorhead
- Frequency: 790 kHz
- Branding: The Mighty 790, 94.1, & 104.7 KFGO

Programming
- Format: Talk radio
- Affiliations: ABC News Radio; NBC News Radio; Compass Media Networks; Premiere Networks; Westwood One

Ownership
- Owner: Midwest Communications; (Midwest Communications, Inc.)
- Sister stations: KVOX-FM; KFGO-FM; KRWK; KNFL; KOYY

History
- First air date: March 14, 1948
- Former call signs: KXGO (1958–1966)
- Call sign meaning: Fargo

Technical information
- Licensing authority: FCC
- Facility ID: 34421
- Class: B
- Power: 5,000 watts
- Transmitter coordinates: 46°43′4.9″N 96°48′6.3″W
- Translator: 94.1 K231CV (Fargo)
- Repeater: 104.7 KFGO-FM (Hope)

Links
- Public license information: Public file; LMS
- Webcast: Listen live
- Website: kfgo.com

KFGO (790 AM) is a radio station licensed to Fargo, North Dakota, United States. KFGO broadcasts a talk radio format serving the Fargo-Moorhead metropolitan area, branded "The Mighty 790, 94.1, and 104.7". The station is currently owned by Midwest Communications Inc. All the offices and studios are located at 1020 S. 25th Street in Fargo, while its transmitter array is located north of Oxbow. It is an affiliate of ABC News Radio. KFGO is simulcast on KFGO-FM 104.7 and translator K231CV (94.1 FM).

Due to its transmitter power and North Dakota's flat land (with near-perfect ground conductivity), KFGO's provides at least secondary coverage to most of eastern half of North Dakota, northwest Minnesota, northeast South Dakota, and southern Manitoba (a Canadian province). Its coverage area includes Grand Forks, North Dakota, Bemidji, Minnesota, Winnipeg, Manitoba, and Aberdeen, South Dakota.

== Programming ==
KFGO broadcasts hourly news updates from ABC News Radio. On weekdays, KFGO has live, local talk shows daily, including News and Views hosted by former state senator Joel Heitkamp. During the overnight hours, KFGO broadcasts Premiere Networks' Coast to Coast AM and Westwood One's First Light.

Weekends have a variety of local and national programs. On Saturday mornings, KFGO plays classic country music on The Solid Gold Saturday Morning. KFGO also produces weekend lifestyle programming about topics such as outdoor living and technology and has a trivia quiz show on Saturdays. CBS News programming was also broadcast on weekends before CBS shuttered their radio division, including the CBS News Weekend Roundup, Face the Nation, and Eye on Veterans.

With the closure of CBS News Radio in May 2026, KFGO became an ABC Radio News affiliate.

=== Sports coverage ===
- Minnesota Twins baseball
- Minnesota Vikings football
- Minnesota Wild hockey
- North Dakota Fighting Hawks football, men's basketball, and men's ice hockey

== Awards ==
KFGO has won two Peabody Awards, one for their coverage of a blizzard in 1984 and one in 1997 for their coverage of the 1997 Red River flood.
