= KNFL (AM) =

- Fargo, North Dakota; United States
- Broadcast area: Fargo-Moorhead
- Frequency: 740 kHz
- Branding: The Fan 740/107.3

Programming
- Format: Sports
- Affiliations: KFAN Radio Network; ESPN Radio

Ownership
- Owner: Midwest Communications; (Midwest Communications, Inc.)
- Sister stations: KFGO, KFGO-FM, KOYY, KRWK, KVOX-FM

History
- First air date: November 13, 2006
- Former call signs: KKAG (2006–2007); KVOX (2007–2017)
- Call sign meaning: National Football League; (Midwest also owns WNFL Green Bay)

Technical information
- Licensing authority: FCC
- Facility ID: 135847
- Class: B
- Power: 50,000 watts (day); 7,500 watts (critical hours); 940 watts (night)
- Transmitter coordinates: 46°58′28.9″N 96°30′13.3″W
- Translator: 107.3 K297BW (Fargo)

Links
- Public license information: Public file; LMS
- Webcast: Listen Live
- Website: 740thefan.com

KNFL (740 kHz, "740 The Fan") is an AM radio station broadcasting a sports format. The station serves the Fargo-Moorhead metropolitan area. The station is currently owned by Wausau, Wisconsin-based Midwest Communications Inc. All the offices and studios are located at 1020 S. 25th Street in Fargo, while its 6-tower transmitter array is located northeast of Glyndon. It has the fifth biggest daytime AM signal in the country.

== History ==
First known as KKAG, 740 AM signed on testing its signal on November 13, 2006, with open carriers and test tones. The station became fully licensed by the Federal Communications Commission (FCC) on May 28, 2007, originally owned by Jeffrey Dress of Kennewick, Washington, and had been on the air since with a classic country format.

Although the radio industry already had speculated so, KKAG was originally planned to be operated by the late Robert Ingstad, but the project was put on the back burner when Robert Ingstad's brother, James Ingstad, purchased the Clear Channel radio station group of Fargo in January 2007.

On Monday, June 11, 2007, it was announced that Radio Fargo-Moorhead, owned by James Ingstad, planned to buy KKAG from Jeffrey Dress, and that it would broadcast the Fan Radio Network. KVOX on 1280 AM (now KVXR), former home of The Fan, is now a Catholic radio station owned by Real Presence radio. The official sale to Ingstad was approved on August 3, 2007. KKAG began simulcasting KVOX on August 14, 2007. On September 14, 2007, KKAG changed its call letters to KVOX, and the former KVOX (1280 AM) switched to KVXR.

On March 29, 2017, the station changed its call sign to the current KNFL.
