= KKLS-FM =

Radio station in South Dakota, US

Coordinates: 43.729°N 97.088°W

- Sioux Falls, South Dakota; United States
- Broadcast area: Sioux Falls, South Dakota
- Frequency: 104.7 MHz
- Branding: Hot 104.7

Programming
- Format: Contemporary hit radio
- Affiliations: Compass Media Networks; Premiere Networks; United Stations Radio Networks

Ownership
- Owner: Townsquare Media; (Townsquare License, LLC)
- Sister stations: KXRB-FM, KIKN-FM, KKRC-FM, KSOO, KSOO-FM, KXRB, KYBB

History
- First air date: 1975 (as KIOV)
- Former call signs: KIOV (1975–1988)
- Call sign meaning: "Double KLS" - a play on WLS in Chicago

Technical information
- Licensing authority: FCC
- Facility ID: 61324
- Class: C1
- ERP: 100,000 watts
- HAAT: 299 meters

Links
- Public license information: Public file; LMS
- Webcast: Listen Live
- Website: hot1047.com

KKLS-FM (104.7 MHz, "Hot 104.7") is a radio station broadcasting a contemporary hit radio format. The station serves the Sioux Falls, South Dakota, area. KKLS and its sister stations were owned by Southern Minnesota Broadcasting until 2003 when they were sold to Cumulus Media, and sold again in 2012 to Townsquare Media.

Its studios are located on Tennis Lane in Sioux Falls, while its transmitter is located near Humboldt.

== History ==
The station signed on in 1975 as KIOV, and aired a country music format. In January 1988, KIOV changed call letters to KKLS-FM, and flipped to adult contemporary as "Class FM". The station later shifted to oldies as "Oldies 104.7". At the time, the station was under ownership of Southern Minnesota Broadcasting.

On December 3, 1997, at 3 pm, after three days of stunting with a loop of "It's the End of the World as We Know It (And I Feel Fine)" by R.E.M., KKLS flipped to its current contemporary hit radio format as "Hot 104.7", filling a format void that was left by KPAT's flip to country in 1993. Prior to the flip, KKCK (then at 99.7 FM, now at 94.7 FM) served as the only contemporary hit radio station in the Sioux Falls market between 1992 and 1997.

In 2003, Southern Minnesota Broadcasting sold their Sioux Falls stations to Cumulus Media. In 2012, it was announced that Cumulus was selling their Sioux Falls stations to Townsquare Media.

Since 2018, Hot 104.7 currently competes against KQSF in the contemporary hit radio format.
