= KTWB =

Radio station in Sioux Falls, South Dakota

Coordinates: 43.751°N 96.890°W

- Sioux Falls, South Dakota; United States
- Broadcast area: Sioux Falls, South Dakota
- Frequency: 92.5 MHz
- Branding: Big Country 92.5

Programming
- Format: Country

Ownership
- Owner: Midwest Communications; (Midwest Communications, Inc.)
- Sister stations: KELO; KELO-FM; KELQ; KRRO; KQSF; KWSN

History
- First air date: July 11, 1964
- Former call signs: KELO-FM (1964–2013)

Technical information
- Facility ID: 41972
- Class: C
- ERP: 100,000 watts
- HAAT: 555 meters (1,821 ft)

Links
- Webcast: Listen live
- Website: www.ktwb.com

KTWB is a radio station in Sioux Falls, South Dakota airing a country music format. The station is owned by Midwest Communications. Its studios are located on South Phillips Avenue in Sioux Falls, while its transmitter is located near Rowena.

== History ==
The station signed on the air on July 11, 1964, as KELO-FM.

After a 52-year history in Sioux Falls radio, Midcontinent sold all of its stations, including KELO-FM, to Backyard Broadcasting of Baltimore in 2004. It marked the company's exit from broadcasting, having sold off KELO-TV in 1996. Backyard sold its seven Sioux Falls stations in 2012 to their present owner, Midwest Communications, in a $13.35 million transaction.

On October 28, 2013, KELO-FM and its adult contemporary format moved to 101.9 FM, swapping frequencies with KTWB and its country format.
