= KQAQ =

Radio station in Austin, Minnesota

- Austin, Minnesota; United States
- Broadcast area: Austin-Albert Lea; Rochester, Minnesota; Mason City, Iowa
- Frequency: 970 kHz
- Branding: KQAQ 970 AM

Programming
- Format: Religious
- Affiliations: EWTN

Ownership
- Owner: Real Presence Radio

History
- First air date: April 16, 1960
- Former call signs: KGHR (1984–1994); KNFX (1994–2008)

Technical information
- Licensing authority: FCC
- Facility ID: 56811
- Class: B
- Power: 5,000 watts (day); 500 watts (night)
- Transmitter coordinates: 43°42′26.9″N 92°56′45.7″W

Links
- Public license information: Public file; LMS
- Website: yourcatholicradiostation.com

KQAQ (970 AM) is a radio station broadcasting a religious format. Licensed to Austin, Minnesota, United States, the station serves the Austin-Albert Lea and Rochester, MN areas. The station is currently owned by Real Presence Radio of Grand Forks.

The station previously aired The Fan sports programming under the call sign KNFX, until being sold from Clear Channel in 2008.

KQAQ began broadcasting on April 15, 1960. At its launch, the station's president and general manager, Lester Gould, famously stated that the programming would avoid "frantic" music, specifically excluding rock and roll in favor of more melodic, adult-oriented selections. In its early years, the station operated at 5,000 watts during the day using a directional antenna system.

The station's identity has undergone several changes through the decades. In 1984, the call sign was changed to KGHR, and in 1994, it became KNFX, often carrying sports programming such as "The Fan" during its time under corporate ownership. In 2008, the station returned to its original KQAQ call letters. Throughout this period, the station was a local staple for news and agricultural reports, eventually transitioning to a classic country format branded as "Classic Country 970" while owned by Hometown Broadcasting.

In the mid-1980s, the station transitioned through regional owners, including the Nolan Broadcast Group, coinciding with its call letter change to KGHR. In the late 1990s and early 2000s, the station was swept up in industry-wide consolidation, eventually falling under the ownership of Clear Channel Communications (now iHeartMedia). On June 2, 2008, Three Eagles Communications acquired the station from Clear Channel as part of a larger market reshuffling. Three Eagles later sold its southern Minnesota cluster to Hometown Broadcasting.

In 2017, the station moved from commercial to non-commercial status when it was sold to Real Presence Radio, a Catholic broadcasting network based in North Dakota. The sale price for KQAQ was approximately $100,000. Today, the station serves as a regional affiliate for EWTN Radio programming.
