= KJRC =

- Rapid City, South Dakota; United States
- Broadcast area: Rapid City area
- Frequency: 89.9 MHz

Programming
- Format: Catholic radio
- Affiliations: Real Presence Radio

Ownership
- Owner: Real Presence Radio

History
- Former call signs: KQFR (2002–2015)

Technical information
- Licensing authority: FCC
- Facility ID: 90517
- Class: C2
- ERP: 2,300 watts
- HAAT: 562 meters (1,844 ft)
- Transmitter coordinates: 44°19′42″N 103°50′3″W

Links
- Public license information: Public file; LMS

KJRC (89.9 FM) is a radio station broadcasting a Catholic format. Licensed to Rapid City, South Dakota, United States, the station serves the Rapid City area. The station is currently owned by Real Presence Radio.

The station previously held the callsign KQFR, was an affiliate of Family Radio and was owned by Family Stations, Inc. Effective July 31, 2015, Real Presence Radio purchased the station for $200,000. At the same time, the station's callsign was changed to KJRC. KJRC became an affiliate of Real Presence Radio on August 3, 2015.
