= WIFC =

Contemporary hit radio station in Wausau, Wisconsin

Coordinates: 44.921°N 89.691°W

- Wausau, Wisconsin; United States
- Broadcast area: Wausau–Stevens Point
- Frequency: 95.5 MHz
- Branding: 95-5 WIFC

Programming
- Language: English
- Format: Contemporary hit radio
- Affiliations: Compass Media Networks; WAOW (weather reports)

Ownership
- Owner: Midwest Communications; (WRIG, Inc.)
- Sister stations: WDEZ; WOZZ; WRIG; WSAU; WSAU-FM

History
- First air date: August 29, 1948
- Former call signs: WLIN-FM (1948–1962); WSAU-FM (1962–1969)
- Call sign meaning: Wisconsin Forward Communications (Forward is Wisconsin's state motto)

Technical information
- Licensing authority: FCC
- Facility ID: 74102
- Class: C
- ERP: 98,600 watts
- HAAT: 329 meters (1,079 ft)

Links
- Public license information: Public file; LMS
- Webcast: Listen live
- Website: www.wifc.com

WIFC (95.5 FM) is a heritage contemporary hit radio station located in Wausau, Wisconsin. The station is owned and operated locally by Midwest Communications, previously owned by Journal Communications, Dave Raven (Raven Broadcasting) and originally Forward Communications. WIFC's main competition comes from WHTQ, a top 40-CHR radio station broadcasting to the same area.

Formerly WSAU-FM (a beautiful music station), WIFC has broadcast its current format since August 1969, making it one of the longest-running continuously-broadcasting CHR-top 40 stations in the United States.

== History ==
On May 13, 1947, U.S. Representative Alvin E. O'Konski applied to build an FM station in Merrill, Wisconsin; the Federal Communications Commission (FCC) issued a conditional grant on June 26. The conditional authorization proposed operation on 101.7 MHz. A construction permit issued to WLIN in June 1948 specified 100.7 MHz. The FCC granted WLIN-FM its station license on January 15, 1952, authorizing 100.7 MHz with 9.35 kilowatts of effective radiated power.

The FCC assigned the call letters WOSA to the FM station in 1952. By April 1953, it was again identified as WLIN, an O'Konski-owned FM station in Merrill. On December 30, 1955, the FCC approved assignment of the license to Alvin E. O'Konski Enterprises Inc., describing the transaction as a corporate change without a change in control.

A $225,000 agreement to sell WLIN and O'Konski's AM station, WOSA in Wausau, was announced in January 1958, subject to FCC approval. The purchaser, Wisconsin Valley Television Corporation, had completed the acquisition by August, when Broadcasting reported that WLIN would retain its Merrill operation.

In February 1959, the FCC authorized WLIN to change its community from Merrill to Wausau and its frequency from 100.7 to 95.5 MHz. The authorization also increased effective radiated power from 9.35 to 20.5 kilowatts and antenna height above average terrain from 260 ft (79 m) to 1,010 ft (308 m). A construction permit granted on March 22, 1961, authorized a further increase to 34 kilowatts and installation of a new transmitter.

The station's call letters changed from WLIN to WSAU-FM in 1962. By 1964, it was broadcasting in stereo. Wisconsin Valley Television Corporation renamed itself Forward Communications Corporation in 1966.

WSAU-FM adopted the WIFC call letters in 1969. By November, the station had replaced its automated easy listening programming with a Top 40 format under program director Cliff Thompson. Its playlist contained between 60 and 70 records, including some progressive rock, and Dell Weaver served as music director. WIFC retained an overnight simulcast of its AM sister station, with separate programming from 6 a.m. to midnight.

Dave "Raven" Ewaskowitz became manager of WSAU and WIFC in 1971. In November 1980, Forward agreed to sell the two stations for $2.75 million to a group comprising Raven, with a 55 percent interest, and Manson Insurance Inc., with 45 percent. Radio & Records reported the sale to Mid-West Media Inc. in May 1981.

In 1985, Wausau Radio Inc., principally owned by Raven, agreed to sell WSAU and WIFC to WTMJ Inc. for approximately $3.5 million. WTMJ was the broadcasting subsidiary of The Journal Company, publisher of The Milwaukee Journal. Under Journal ownership, WIFC was branded "FM-95" in 1987, with Duff Damos serving as program director and morning host. Damos described a contemporary hit playlist combining rock and urban music with approximately one oldie per hour, and said that WIFC exchanged programming ideas with Journal's WKTI in Milwaukee.

In 1992, the FCC proposed a $6,250 forfeiture against WTMJ over advertisements WIFC had broadcast in 1991 for the Grand Royale Casino at Mole Lake, Wisconsin. The commission found that the advertisements violated its lottery-advertising restrictions and upheld the penalty in 1993.

In April 1996, Midwest Communications announced plans to acquire WSAU and WIFC from Journal Broadcast Group. The $3.5 million transaction identified WRIG Inc., headed by Duke Wright, as the purchaser; the company already owned WRIG in Schofield and WDEZ in Wausau. Assignment of WIFC's license from WTMJ Inc. to WRIG Inc. was consummated on August 8, 1996.

The FCC rescinded the casino-advertising forfeiture in April 1999. Its order cited WTMJ's efforts to comply with the rules, the limited guidance available when the advertisements aired, and the licensee's overall compliance record.

By 2005, WIFC was using a shared ten-bay FM antenna with WDEZ and WHRM on Rib Mountain's 649 ft (198 m) tower, which had been erected in 2000. Its studios were in Midwest Communications' shared facility on Scott Street in Wausau.

By 2021, morning host Dave Kallaway had held his WIFC role for nearly three decades. In an interview that year, he said that he and his wife had organized the station's Disco Cures Cancer fundraising dance for 19 years. As of October 2026, Midwest Communications marketed the station as "95-5 WIFC" with a contemporary hit radio format.
