= KOYY =

- Fargo, North Dakota; United States
- Broadcast area: Fargo-Moorhead
- Frequency: 93.7 MHz
- Branding: Y94

Programming
- Format: Top 40 (CHR)
- Affiliations: Premiere Networks

Ownership
- Owner: Midwest Communications; (Midwest Communications, Inc.)
- Sister stations: KFGO; KFGO-FM; KNFL; KRWK; KVOX-FM

History
- First air date: February 28, 1965
- Former call signs: WDAY-FM (1965–2015)
- Call sign meaning: in reference to Y94

Technical information
- Facility ID: 22123
- Class: C0
- ERP: 100,000 watts
- HAAT: 307 meters (1,007 ft)
- Transmitter coordinates: 47°0′35.9″N 97°11′42.3″W

Links
- Webcast: Listen live
- Website: www.y94.com

KOYY (93.7 FM, "Y94") is a radio station broadcasting a Top 40 (CHR) format serving the Fargo-Moorhead metropolitan area. It first began broadcasting in 1965. The station is owned by Midwest Communications. All the offices and studios are located at 1020 S. 25th Street in Fargo, while its transmitter is located near Amenia.

== History ==
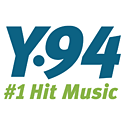
former logo

The station signed on in February 28, 1965, as WDAY-FM with a beautiful music format. On January 1, 1983, the station changed to a Top 40 format as "Y94", and broadcast commercial-free for the first several months. It was owned by Forum Communications, along with WDAY and WDAY-TV. For a period in the early 1990s, the station adopted a hot adult contemporary format, and was renamed "Mix 93.7" on February 11, 1993. It later reverted to the "Y94" name and the Top 40/CHR format on February 15, 1996. The station was sold to James Ingstad of Fargo that same year, and sold to Clear Channel in 2000, along with several other radio stations in the area.

On September 28, 2006, the Clear Channel station cluster in Fargo (including WDAY-FM) was sold back to James Ingstad, including KDAM, which signed on in 2002. The sale was approved by the Federal Communications Commission (FCC) on January 19, 2007. The station announced the sale to Midwest Communications on September 18, 2012, and the sale was finalized in 2013.

Y94 is the Fargo-Moorhead affiliate of American Top 40.

On June 1, 2007, the antenna system used for WDAY-FM, KFNW-FM, and KRWK caught fire, leading the stations to temporarily broadcast on auxiliary facilities at a lower power. The stations resumed full power on August 3, 2007.

Midwest Communications changed Y94's call letters to KOYY on December 16, 2015, retiring the heritage WDAY-FM calls which had been in use for 50 years.

=== Conan O'Brien job offer ===
On January 18, 2010, Conan O'Brien revealed that he was offered to be a morning show sidekick among other job offers.
