= KRWK =

- Fargo, North Dakota; United States
- Broadcast area: Fargo-Moorhead
- Frequency: 101.9 MHz
- Branding: 101.9 Jack FM

Programming
- Format: Adult hits
- Affiliations: Jack FM network; Fargo Force; Minnesota Vikings

Ownership
- Owner: Midwest Communications; (Midwest Communications, Inc.)
- Sister stations: KVOX-FM; KFGO; KFGO-FM; KNFL; KOYY

History
- First air date: February 23, 1984
- Former call signs: KRRZ (1983–1986); KFGO-FM (1986–2002); KKBX (2002–2007)
- Call sign meaning: "Rock" (former branding)

Technical information
- Licensing authority: FCC
- Facility ID: 34422
- Class: C1
- ERP: 96,000 watts
- HAAT: 305 meters (1,001 ft)
- Transmitter coordinates: 46°51′50.8″N 96°49′7.2″W

Links
- Public license information: Public file; LMS
- Webcast: Listen live
- Website: jackfmfargo.com

KRWK (101.9 FM), known as "101.9 Jack FM", is a radio station serving the Fargo-Moorhead metropolitan area. It broadcasts an adult hits format and switches to Christmas music from mid-November through December as "Jack Frost FM". It first began broadcasting in 1983 under the call sign KRRZ.

The station is owned by Midwest Communications. The offices and studios are located at 1020 S. 25th Street in Fargo, while its transmitter is located near Amenia.

== History ==
The station began life on February 23, 1984 with the KRRZ call sign, broadcasting at 6,000 watts, with an adult contemporary format as "Magic 102". Upon upgrading to 93,000 watts in 1986, the station changed to a country format as "Country 102" with the KFGO-FM call sign. The KRRZ call sign was transferred to 1390 AM in Minot, North Dakota. As the country music scene heated up in the early 1990s, the station adopted the moniker of "Moose Country 102".

The station was sold to Otter Tail Power Company in 1995 along with KFGO, KDLM-FM, KVOX-FM, and KVOX. the stations were later sold to James Ingstad in 1999 (with the exception of KVOX-FM which was sold to Triad Broadcasting). In 2000, Clear Channel Communications bought Ingstad's stations, and changed the moniker to "K102", with a similar logo to co-owned KEEY-FM in Minneapolis, Minnesota.

=== The Box 101.9 ===
On April 11, 2002, KFGO-FM flipped to a classic rock format, and renamed itself as KKBX "The Box 101.9". Brought on during the flip was 107.9 The Fox's morning show duo, Robbie and Dave. In 2005, the syndicated The Bob & Tom Show replaced Robbie and Dave, and the format was adjusted to 1980s hits.

On September 28, 2006, KKBX and the other Clear Channel stations in Fargo were sold back to James Ingstad, who lives in Fargo. The sale was approved by the Federal Communications Commission (FCC) on January 19, 2007.

=== Rock 102 ===
On February 10, 2007, The Box tweaked to a mainstream rock "on shuffle", as a stunt, and changed its call sign to KRWK. On February 16, 2007, KRWK became "Rock 102" with a mainstream rock format, competing with both Triad Broadcasting's active rock station Q98 and classic rock station 107.9 The Fox.

On June 1, 2007, the transmitter used for Rock 102, WDAY-FM "Y94", and KFNW-FM went on fire putting the stations off the air. In April 2008, the station tweaked back to classic rock.

==== Billboard controversy ====
On July 19, 2007, a woman wrote a letter to the editor to The Forum expressing concern over the appropriateness of a billboard of Rock 102 with a woman in tankini standing with a caption saying, "Now Turn Us On!" .

=== 101.9 Talk FM ===
KRWK shifted to a talk format on March 19, 2012, branded as "101.9 Talk FM". The lineup included Tom Becka in the morning, Kilmead & Friends, Rush Limbaugh, Sean Hannity, JD Hayworth, and others.

=== Rock 102 returns ===
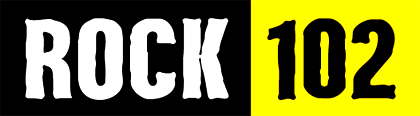
Rock 102 logo, 2007-2012 and 2013-2015

"Talk FM", because of being the Fargo affiliate for both Rush Limbaugh and Sean Hannity, did not fare well in the Arbitron ratings, registering a 1.7 share in the Spring 2013 ratings, well behind overall leader KFGO, another talk station on AM who had a 15.5 share. At 4 p.m. on September 8, 2013, following the end of the Minnesota Vikings season opener broadcast, KRWK returned to its original rock format and branding as Rock 102 in an effort to compete with KQWB-FM, who relocated from 98.7 to 105.1 just a few weeks earlier, and KPFX. The station launched with 2,000 songs in a row, and remained Fargo's FM affiliate for the Minnesota Vikings as well as North Dakota State Bison football and Fargo Force hockey.

=== Mix 101.9 ===
Mix 101.9 logo, 2015-2017

On July 22, 2015, KRWK abruptly dropped the rock format and flipped to AC as "Mix 101.9", adopting the previous format of KMJO, which flipped to classic country simultaneously.

=== 101.9 Jack FM ===
On September 12, 2017, at midnight, after playing "One Way or Another" by Blondie, KRWK flipped to variety hits as "101.9 Jack FM". The first song on Jack FM was "Life is a Highway" by Tom Cochrane.
