= KXRB-FM =

Radio station in Brandon–Sioux Falls, South Dakota

- Brandon, South Dakota; United States
- Broadcast area: Sioux Falls, South Dakota
- Frequency: 100.1 MHz
- Branding: 1140 AM and 100.1 FM KXRB

Programming
- Format: Classic country
- Affiliations: Compass Media Networks; Westwood One

Ownership
- Owner: Townsquare Media; (Townsquare License, LLC)
- Sister stations: KIKN-FM, KKLS-FM, KKRC-FM, KSOO, KSOO-FM, KXRB, KYBB

History
- First air date: November 5, 2007
- Former call signs: KDEZ (2007–2017)

Technical information
- Licensing authority: FCC
- Facility ID: 166031
- Class: A
- ERP: 2,150 watts
- HAAT: 170.2 meters (558 ft)
- Transmitter coordinates: 43°31′7″N 96°32′5″W

Links
- Public license information: Public file; LMS
- Webcast: Listen Live
- Website: kxrb.com

KXRB-FM (100.1 MHz) is a radio station broadcasting a classic country format. Licensed to Brandon, South Dakota, United States, the station serves the Sioux Falls area. The station is currently owned by Townsquare Media.

Its studios are located on Tennis Lane in Sioux Falls, while its transmitter is located near Rowena.

== History ==
On August 7, 2017, KDEZ changed its format from adult contemporary to classic country under new KXRB-FM calls.
