= KCSD (FM) =

Coordinates: 43.5744°N 96.6556°W

- Sioux Falls, South Dakota; United States
- Frequency: 90.9 MHz (HD Radio)

Programming
- Format: Public radio; News/talk, jazz, AAA
- Subchannels: HD2: Classical
- Affiliations: NPR; Public Radio International; American Public Media

Ownership
- Owner: South Dakota Public Broadcasting; (South Dakota Board of Directors for Educational Telecommunications)

History
- First air date: 1985
- Call sign meaning: Clark (as in "Lewis and Clark") South Dakota

Technical information
- Licensing authority: FCC
- Facility ID: 60485
- Class: A
- ERP: 6,000 watts
- HAAT: 80 meters (260 ft)

Links
- Public license information: Public file; LMS
- Webcast: Listen live
- Website: sdpb.org

KCSD (90.9 FM) is a National Public Radio member radio station licensed to Sioux Falls, South Dakota. It is owned by the South Dakota Board of Directors for Educational Telecommunications and is part of South Dakota Public Broadcasting's statewide network.

The station signed on in 1985 as part of SDPB's effort to improve coverage in the state's largest city. Previously, flagship station KUSD-FM only provided grade B coverage of Sioux Falls. The license was held by the University of Sioux Falls, but SDPB operated it under a longstanding management agreement. SDPB bought the station outright in December 2013. The purchase, at a price of $420,000, was consummated on February 10, 2014.
