= KSOO-FM =

Radio tation in Lennox–Sioux Falls, South Dakota, United States

Simulcasting KIKN-FM Salem
- Lennox, South Dakota; United States
- Broadcast area: Sioux Falls, South Dakota
- Frequency: 99.1 MHz
- Branding: Kickin' Country 99.1/100.5

Programming
- Format: Country
- Affiliations: Compass Media Networks; Premiere Networks

Ownership
- Owner: Townsquare Media; (Townsquare License, LLC)
- Sister stations: KIKN-FM, KKLS-FM, KKRC-FM, KSOO, KXRB, KXRB-FM, KYBB

History
- First air date: 2008

Technical information
- Licensing authority: FCC
- Facility ID: 164208
- Class: C3
- ERP: 25,000 watts
- HAAT: 100 meters (330 ft)
- Transmitter coordinates: 43°22′36″N 96°48′19″W

Links
- Public license information: Public file; LMS
- Webcast: Listen Live
- Website: kikn.com

KSOO-FM (99.1 MHz, "Kickin' Country 99.1/100.5") is a radio station with a country music format, simulcasting KIKN-FM 100.5 Salem. Licensed to Lennox, South Dakota, United States, the station serves the Sioux Falls area. The station is currently owned by Townsquare Media.

Its studios are located on Tennis Lane in Sioux Falls, while its transmitter is located near Lennox.

== History ==
KSOO-FM signed on in August 2008, simulcasting KSOO and its news/talk format. KSOO-FM switched to ESPN Radio in April 2009. In addition to national ESPN Radio programming, "ESPN 99.1" was also home to Overtime with Jeff Thurn. "ESPN 99.1" was an affiliate of the Nebraska Cornhuskers Radio Network and the Green Bay Packers Radio Network.

On August 1, 2021, KSOO-FM changed their format from sports (which moved to KSOO (1000 AM)) to a simulcast of country-formatted KIKN-FM, branded as "Kickin' Country 99.1 & 100.5".
