= KELQ =

Coordinates: 43.966°N 96.820°W

Simulcast of KELO (AM), Sioux Falls
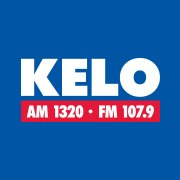
- Flandreau, South Dakota; United States
- Broadcast area: Sioux Falls, South Dakota
- Frequency: 107.9 MHz
- Branding: Newstalk 1320 & 107.9 KELO

Programming
- Format: News/talk
- Affiliations: Fox News Radio; NBC News Radio; Compass Media Networks; Premiere Networks; Salem Radio Network; Westwood One; Sioux Falls Stampede

Ownership
- Owner: Midwest Communications; (Midwest Communications, Inc.)
- Sister stations: KELO; KELO-FM; KRRO; KQSF; KTWB; KWSN

History
- First air date: 2001 (as KKHG)
- Former call signs: KSQB (1998–2000, CP); KSQB-FM (2000–2001, CP); KSOB-FM (2001, CP); KKHG (2001–2004); KWSF (2004–2006); KXQL (2006–2013)
- Call sign meaning: similar to KELO

Technical information
- Licensing authority: FCC
- Facility ID: 36933
- Class: C2
- ERP: 21,000 watts
- HAAT: 232 meters (761 ft)

Links
- Public license information: Public file; LMS
- Webcast: Listen live
- Website: kelo.com

KELQ (107.9 FM) is a radio station broadcasting a news/talk format, simulcasting KELO (1320 AM). Licensed to Flandreau, South Dakota, it serves the Sioux Falls area. The station is owned by Midwest Communications.

== History ==
On March 1, 2013, KXQL changed its call letters to KELQ and changed its format from oldies (branded as "Kool 107.9") to news/talk, simulcasting KELO 1320 AM.
