= KZOI =

Radio station in Dakota City, Nebraska, serving Sioux City, Iowa

- Dakota City, Nebraska; United States
- Frequency: 1250 kHz
- Branding: La Fiesta 97.1

Programming
- Format: Regional Mexican

Ownership
- Owner: Fiesta Radio; (La Fiesta 971, LLC)

History
- First air date: 1989 (as KTFJ)
- Former call signs: KTFJ (1988–2014)

Technical information
- Licensing authority: FCC
- Facility ID: 17201
- Class: B
- Power: 500 watts (day); 700 watts (night)
- Transmitter coordinates: 42°26′33″N 96°15′41″W
- Translator: 97.1 K246CJ (Sioux City, Iowa)

Links
- Public license information: Public file; LMS
- Webcast: Listen live
- Website: radiofiesta971.com

KZOI (1250 AM) and its translator at 97.1 FM is a radio station licensed to serve Dakota City, Nebraska. The station is owned by Joaquin Garza's Fiesta Radio, through licensee La Fiesta 971, LLC. It airs a regional Mexican format.

The station was first assigned the call letters KTFJ by the Federal Communications Commission on April 28, 1988, and officially began broadcasting in 1989. In March 2014, the station adopted its current KZOI call sign Under the ownership of Cup O'Dirt, LLC (led by John and Heidi Small), the station was branded as "Sunny Radio", specializing in 1980s pop and rock music.

In November 2017, the station underwent a major programming shift after being acquired by Joaquin Garza's Fiesta Radio (through licensee La Fiesta 971, LLC). The 1980s hits format was replaced with a Regional Mexican format, and the station rebranded as "La Fiesta 97.1", reflecting its primary FM translator frequency.
