= Real Presence Radio =

Catholic talk radio network in the United States

- Type: Radio network
- Country: United States

Programming
- Format: Catholic radio

History
- Launch date: December 12, 2000

Links
- Webcast: Listen live
- Website: realpresenceradio.com

Real Presence Radio is a lay apostolate Catholic talk radio network in the United States, with stations and translators (low power re-broadcasters) in North Dakota, Minnesota, South Dakota, Wisconsin, and Wyoming covering five states and parts of two Canadian provinces. The network's headquarters and main studios are in Fargo, North Dakota. The network also carries some programming from the national EWTN Radio network.

== History ==
Real Presence Radio began on November 6, 2004, following the purchase of KWTL AM 1370 (then known as KFJM AM) in Grand Forks, covering most of the Diocese of Fargo and the Diocese of Crookston. On February 6, 2009, Real Presence Radio purchased KVXR AM 1280 in Fargo from Voice of Reason Radio. KVXR switched programming from the Relevant Radio network to a simulcast of KWTL, forming the Real Presence Radio network.

On October 22, 2010, the network built and signed on KPHA FM 91.3 in Bismarck. Translators (low power rebroadcasters) began broadcasting in Minot (91.1 FM) on February 20, 2011, and Williston (89.1 FM) on January 20, 2011. On October 16, 2012, Real Presence Radio purchased the KZZQ call letters (formerly used for KPUL in Des Moines Iowa) and began operating 101.9 FM KZZQ, which serves the Dickinson area, and on December 1, 2014, the network began broadcasting on 91.7 KXRP in Bismarck and on December 12, 2014, 104.1 KZTW in Tioga, ND. The network purchased a station in the Duluth-Superior area, WWEN, on February 15, 2016, from American Family Radio. Effective March, 2018, Real Presence Radio purchased KGLL in Gillette, Wyoming from American Family Radio.

Real Presence Radio is also heard on low power affiliate stations 98.9 KXYM-LP in June 2015 in Belcourt, ND and 99.7 KZEB-LP in September 2014 in Jamestown, ND.

== Station list ==
Owned and Operated

City	Callsign	Frequency	Area
Austin, Minnesota	KQAQ	970 AM	Rochester, MN, north-central IA
Babbitt, Minnesota	KZJZ	106.7 FM	Babbitt, MN area
Ely, Minnesota	W288AI	105.5	
Wilton, Minnesota	WBKK	820 AM	Bemidji, MN area
Bemidji, Minnesota	K254DJ	98.7 FM	Fill-in translator for WBKK
Moorhead, Minnesota	KVXR	1280 AM	Eastern ND, Western MN, Northeastern SD
Fargo, North Dakota	K252GC	98.3 FM	Fill-in translator for KVXR
Grand Forks, North Dakota	KWTL	1370 AM	Eastern ND, Northwestern MN, Southern MB including Winnipeg, NW ON
Grand Forks, North Dakota	K223DF	92.5 FM	Fill-in translator for KWTL
Harvey, North Dakota	K217GL	91.3 FM	
Mandan, North Dakota	KPHA	91.7 FM	
Minot, North Dakota	K216EE	91.1 FM	
Montevideo, Minnesota	KBPG	89.5 FM	
Richardton, North Dakota	KZZQ	101.9 FM	Dickinson, ND area, Southeast ND
Tioga, North Dakota	KZTW	104.1 FM	Williston, ND area, Northwest ND
Brookings, South Dakota	K235DE	94.9 FM	
Hartford, South Dakota	KSTJ	91.3 FM	Sioux Falls, SD area
Ipswich, South Dakota	KSJP	88.9 FM	Aberdeen, SD area
Rapid City, South Dakota	KJRC	89.9 FM	
Rapid City, South Dakota	K234BR	94.7 FM	
Sioux Falls, South Dakota	KGWD	94.5 FM	Sioux Falls, SD area
Wentworth, Wisconsin	WWEN	88.1 FM	Duluth-Superior area
Gillette, Wyoming	KGLL	88.1 FM	
Winona, Minnesota	KSMR	92.5 FM	
Winona, Minnesota	K232CZ	94.3 FM	Relays KSMR

Affiliates

Affiliate	City	Callsign	Frequency
Two Hearts Radio	Belcourt, North Dakota	KXYM-LP	98.9 FM
Central Dakota Enterprises, Inc.	Bismarck, North Dakota	KXRP	91.3 FM
Hope and Truth Radio	Jamestown, North Dakota	KZEB-LP	99.7 FM
Central Dakota Enterprises, Inc.	Williston, North Dakota	K206EI	89.1 FM
