= KKRC-FM =

Radio station in Sioux Falls, South Dakota

Coordinates: 43.729°N 97.086°W

Sioux Falls, South Dakota; United States
- Broadcast area: Sioux Falls, South Dakota
- Frequency: 97.3 MHz
- Branding: 97.3 KKRC

Programming
- Format: Classic hits
- Affiliations: Compass Media Networks; United Stations Radio Networks; Westwood One

Ownership
- Owner: Townsquare Media; (Townsquare License, LLC)
- Sister stations: KXRB-FM, KIKN-FM, KKLS-FM, KSOO, KSOO-FM, KXRB, KYBB

History
- First air date: 1971 (as KSOO-FM)
- Former call signs: KSOO-FM (1968–1973); KPAT (1973–1994); KMXC (1994–2020)
- Call sign meaning: Former call letters of 93.5 FM in the 1980s

Technical information
- Licensing authority: FCC
- Facility ID: 64711
- Class: C1
- ERP: 100,000 watts
- HAAT: 259.7 meters (852 ft)

Links
- Public license information: Public file; LMS
- Webcast: Listen Live
- Website: 973kkrc.com

KKRC-FM (97.3 MHz, "97.3 KKRC") is a radio station broadcasting a classic hits format, and serves the Sioux Falls, South Dakota area. The station is currently owned by Townsquare Media.

Its studios are located on Tennis Lane in Sioux Falls, while its transmitter is located near Humboldt.

== History ==
The station signed on as KSOO-FM in 1971. In 1973, KSOO-FM changed call letters to KPAT. For many years, KPAT competed against CHR competitor KKRC-FM for ratings throughout the entirety of the 1980s, and later became Sioux Falls' dominant Top 40/CHR station after KKRC dropped the format in September 1990.

On August 21, 1993, at 6 p.m., KPAT began stunting with a computerized countdown. At noon on August 23, KPAT flipped to country as "Kat Country". On November 22, 1994, at 5 p.m., KPAT flipped to a hot adult contemporary format as KMXC, "Mix 97.3".

The station debuted its current format and callsign on August 31, 2020, after stunting the weekend prior with a loop of "Back in Time" by Huey Lewis and the News. The first song on KKRC-FM was "Let's Go Crazy" by Prince.
