= KIKN-FM =

Radio station in Salem–Sioux Falls, South Dakota

Coordinates: 43°29′22″N 97°26′33″W

- Salem, South Dakota; United States
- Broadcast area: Sioux Falls, South Dakota
- Frequency: 100.5 MHz
- Branding: Kickin' Country 99.1/100.5

Programming
- Format: Country
- Affiliations: Compass Media Networks; Premiere Networks

Ownership
- Owner: Townsquare Media; (Townsquare License, LLC)
- Sister stations: KKLS-FM, KKRC-FM, KSOO, KSOO-FM, KXRB, KXRB-FM, KYBB

History
- First air date: 1991
- Former call signs: KSML (1989–1990, CP); KIKN (1990–1998)
- Call sign meaning: "Kickin'"

Technical information
- Licensing authority: FCC
- Facility ID: 61328
- Class: C1
- ERP: 100,000 watts
- HAAT: 286.8 meters (941 ft)
- Repeater: 99.1 KSOO-FM (Lennox)

Links
- Public license information: Public file; LMS
- Webcast: Listen Live
- Website: kikn.com

KIKN-FM (100.5 MHz, "Kickin' Country 99.1/100.5") is a radio station broadcasting a country music format. Licensed to Salem, South Dakota, it serves the Sioux Falls, South Dakota area. The station is currently owned by Townsquare Media.

Its studios are located on Tennis Lane in Sioux Falls, while its transmitter is located near Dolton.

Due to signal issues within Sioux Falls since the transmitter is located over 35 miles from the city, KIKN also had a translator (low power rebroadcaster) at 100.1 FM with the call sign K261CI. The translator went off the air in November 2007, as KDEZ launched on that frequency.

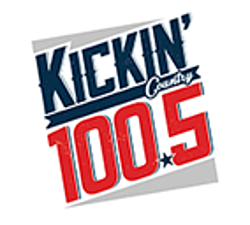
Logo before simulcasting on 99.1

On August 1, 2021, KIKN-FM began simulcasting on KSOO-FM (which dropped their sports/talk format), rebranding as "Kickin' Country 99.1/100.5".
