= KYBB =

Radio station in Canton–Sioux Falls, South Dakota

Coordinates: 43.480°N 96.685°W

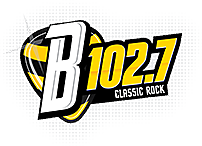
- Canton, South Dakota; United States
- Broadcast area: Sioux Falls, South Dakota
- Frequency: 102.7 MHz
- Branding: B102.7

Programming
- Format: Classic rock
- Affiliations: Compass Media Networks; United Stations Radio Networks; Westwood One

Ownership
- Owner: Townsquare Media; (Townsquare License, LLC)
- Sister stations: KXRB-FM, KIKN-FM, KKLS-FM, KKRC-FM, KSOO, KSOO-FM, KXRB

History
- First air date: 1990
- Former call signs: KIXS (1990–1991); KIXK (1991–1997)
- Call sign meaning: "Bee"

Technical information
- Facility ID: 15308
- Class: C2
- ERP: 50,000 watts
- HAAT: 148 meters (486 ft)

Links
- Webcast: Listen Live
- Website: b1027.com

KYBB (102.7 FM, "B102.7") is a radio station in Sioux Falls, South Dakota (licensed by the Federal Communications Commission (FCC) to Canton, South Dakota), airing a classic rock format. The station is owned by Townsquare Media.

Its studios are located on Tennis Lane in Sioux Falls, while its transmitter is located on Southeastern Avenue just south of Sioux Falls.

== History ==
The station first began broadcasting in 1990 under the call letters KIXS, initially carrying a country music format. In mid-1991, the station's call sign was changed to KIXK. On April 12, 1995, the country format moved to 100.5 (now KIKN-FM), while the station rebranded with a classic rock format, and became known as B102.7. In 1997, KYBB was part of a regional acquisition when Sodak Broadcasting sold its cluster to Cumulus Media. In 2000 the station was acquired by Midcontinent Media. Cumulus would ultimately reacquire the station briefly. The station's ownership changed again in 2012 when current owner Townsquare Media acquired it.
