= KXRB (AM) =

Coordinates: 43°28′49.9″N 96°41′8.2″W

- Sioux Falls, South Dakota; United States
- Frequency: 1140 kHz
- Branding: 1140 AM and FM 100.1 KXRB

Programming
- Format: Classic country
- Affiliations: Compass Media Networks; Westwood One

Ownership
- Owner: Townsquare Media; (Townsquare License, LLC)
- Sister stations: KIKN-FM, KKLS-FM, KKRC-FM, KSOO, KSOO-FM, KXRB-FM, KYBB

History
- First air date: December 10, 1926
- Former call signs: KSOO (1926–2017)

Technical information
- Licensing authority: FCC
- Facility ID: 64710
- Class: B
- Power: 10,000 watts (day); 5,000 watts (night)

Links
- Public license information: Public file; LMS
- Webcast: Listen live
- Website: kxrb.com

KXRB (1140 kHz) is an AM radio station in Sioux Falls, South Dakota, airing a classic country format. The station is owned by Townsquare Media.

The programming on what was then KSOO was previously a mix of local talk shows, including "Viewpoint University", "McDaniel's Mess", and "The Mainstreet Cafe", which focused on the current events of the Sioux Falls area and South Dakota. KSOO also featured a variety of nationally syndicated shows, such as Glenn Beck, Mike Huckabee, The Dave Ramsey Show and Lars Larson. KSOO aired the National Football League games of the Green Bay Packers as the only South Dakota affiliate of the Packers Radio Network.

== History ==
Notable station alumni include Myron Floren, an American musician best known as the accordionist on The Lawrence Welk Show.

On August 7, 2017, KSOO and its news/talk format moved to 1000 AM, swapping frequencies with classic country-formatted KXRB.

== Honors and awards ==
In May 2006, KSOO won one first place plaque in the commercial radio division of the South Dakota Associated Press Broadcasters Association news contest. The contest was for the 2005 calendar year.
