= KSOO (AM) =

Radio station in Sioux Falls, South Dakota

Coordinates: 43°29′13″N 96°35′48″W

- Sioux Falls, South Dakota; United States
- Frequency: 1000 kHz
- Branding: ESPN Sioux Falls

Programming
- Format: Sports
- Affiliations: ESPN Radio; Minnesota Twins

Ownership
- Owner: Townsquare Media; (Townsquare License, LLC)
- Sister stations: KIKN-FM, KKLS-FM, KKRC-FM, KSOO-FM, KXRB, KXRB-FM, KYBB

History
- First air date: February 26, 1969
- Former call signs: KXRB (1969–2017)

Technical information
- Licensing authority: FCC
- Facility ID: 61322
- Class: D
- Power: 10,000 watts (day); 100 watts (night)
- Translator: 102.3 K272FZ (Sioux Falls)

Links
- Public license information: Public file; LMS
- Webcast: Listen live
- Website: espnsiouxfalls.com

KSOO (1000 AM, "ESPN Sioux Falls") is a radio station broadcasting a sports format, with programming from ESPN Radio. The station serves the Sioux Falls, South Dakota, area. The station is currently owned by Townsquare Media.

== History ==
On August 7, 2017, KXRB and its classic country format moved to 1140 AM, swapping frequencies and call signs with news/talk-formatted KSOO.

On August 1, 2021, KSOO flipped to sports, branded as "ESPN Sioux Falls"; the format moved from KSOO-FM, which switched to country.

== Honors and awards ==
In May 2006, KXRB won one first-place plaque in the commercial radio division of the South Dakota Associated Press Broadcasters Association news contest. The contest was for the 2005 calendar year.
