= Backyard Broadcasting =

American radio broadcasting company

Backyard Broadcasting was a radio broadcasting company that primarily owned radio stations in medium-sized, small and rural markets in the United States. The company was owned by the private equity firms Boston Ventures Management and Pacific Corporate Group and was headed by Barry Drake, the former head of Sinclair Broadcast Group and later trustee of the Aloha Station Trust and Ocean Station Trust to be divested by iHeartMedia. Backyard Broadcasting, founded in 2002 from the remains of the earlier Sabre Communications, is based in Jacksonville, Florida:

Backyard Broadcasting began divesting its properties in the early 2010s. The company sold its radio stations in Sioux Falls South Dakota to Midwest Communications in November 2012. In April 2013, it was announced that newly formed Woof Boom Radio was purchasing the Indiana stations. Woof Boom Radio is a pun on WFBM (AM)/WFBM-FM/WFBM-TV, long-time Indianapolis stations that Woof Boom Radio founder Jerry “J” Chapman started at, and his father managed for three decades. Shortly thereafter, Community Broadcasters, LLC announced it would buy the company's assets in the Southern Tier of New York (eventually spinning those stations off to Seven Mountains Media in 2019), leaving the company with only one station cluster in Williamsport, Pennsylvania. The Williamsport cluster was sold to Daniel Farr, then to Van A. Michael in 2019, both of whom have used variants of the Backyard Broadcasting name.
