= Northwestern Media =

Christian radio ministry of the University of Northwestern – St. Paul

- Type: Radio network
- Country: United States

History
- Launch date: February 7, 1949

Links
- Website: unwsp.edu/about-us/radio-ministries

Northwestern Media is the Christian radio ministry of the University of Northwestern – St. Paul, an evangelical university in Roseville, Minnesota. Northwestern Media operates three radio networks serving listeners primarily in the Midwestern United States: the Life Network, a Christian adult contemporary music station; the Faith Network, with Christian talk and teaching programs; and Spirit FM, also playing Christian adult contemporary music.

== History ==
Northwestern Schools, as it was then known, entered the broadcasting business with the launch of KTIS-AM-FM in the Twin Cities on February 7, 1949. The construction of KTIS, costing $40,000, was entirely underwritten by the school's students. Its radio ministry soon expanded. On April 1, 1953, it bought KBOK in Waterloo, Iowa, and changed its call letters to KNWS. Growth continued with the October 25, 1955, launch of KFNW in Fargo, North Dakota, and its 1961 acquisition of KIHO in Sioux Falls, which became KNWC. Northwestern built FM stations in all three cities in 1965 (Fargo's KFNW-FM and Waterloo's KNWS-FM) and 1969 (KNWC-FM in Sioux Falls). Northwestern acquired WRVB-FM in Madison, Wisconsin, in 1973, changing it to WNWC; the college would buy an AM station there in 1997.

In 1983, KDNI in Duluth, Minnesota,came to air; it was joined by KDNW, a second frequency, in 1992. Des Moines, Iowa, became part of Northwestern Media's footprint when radio stations KJJC and KLRX were bought out of receivership and became KNWI and KNWM in 2004. KLJC in Kansas City was acquired in 2013 from Calvary Bible College and renamed it KJNW.

=== Station sales ===
In 2010, citing years of low listener support and the fact that it was subsidized by the rest of the network, Northwestern College closed WSMR in Sarasota, Florida, which it had built in 1996; the station was sold to the University of South Florida for $1.275 million and began broadcasting classical music.

Between 2007 and 2012, Northwestern owned a third station in the Fargo area, KFNL. The station was sold to a commercial broadcaster, Mediactive, LLC, in 2012 and is now KBMW-FM.

Between April and August 2018, UNW briefly owned two secular stations, KDSN-AM-FM, in Denison, Iowa. UNW had acquired the stations in order to move KDSN-FM to another frequency and facilitate a signal upgrade for KNWI.

=== Expansions ===
Northwestern acquired KLBF near Bismarck, North Dakota, from the Educational Media Foundation in 2017; KLBF became a Faith station, making it the westernmost station in the Northwestern Media portfolio and one of its few markets without a Life station. EMF had previously donated WNWW, an AM radio station in Hartford, Connecticut, to the university in 2016.

In 2018, Northwestern Media entered Omaha with its acquisition of KGBI-FM from Salem Media Group for $3.15 million.

Northwestern Media made two major network acquisitions in 2019. The first came in July when the entire Refuge Radio network was donated to UNW. Refuge owned three full-power stations and 13 dependent translators in Minnesota, Iowa and South Dakota. The Refuge network was dismantled and almost all of its transmitters converted to repeat Life and Faith stations; former network key station WJRF in Duluth was taken silent (as Northwestern already had two stations there), the two other full-power stations began simulcasting Life stations, and the translators were spread around the Life and Faith networks.

On August 6, 2019, the Illinois Bible Institute announced it would sell its New Life Radio Network (WBGL/WCIC), a two-network radio ministry primarily broadcasting in Illinois, to the University of Northwestern. UNW paid $9,901,558.34 to acquire its 13 full-power stations and eight translators. The acquisition brought UNW's number of broadcast licenses to 81 in 10 states.

In 2021, Northwestern filed to purchase KLMP and KSLT in Rapid City, South Dakota, and their repeaters from Bethesda Christian Broadcasting, closing on the purchase in January 2022. It obtained new licenses for full-power non-commercial stations in Ashland, Wisconsin, and Grand Rapids, Minnesota, in 2022, and it also purchased a series of FM translators rebroadcasting KSLT from the International Church of the Foursquare Gospel that year.

In a $1.25 million transaction, UNW filed to acquire the Lake Area Educational Broadcasting Foundation, whose Spirit FM and Elevate FM services are broadcast in various cities in Missouri, in March 2023. The purchase, including fifteen stations, eight translators, and six construction permits, was consummated on July 5, 2023.

In 2024, the Sound of Life Radio Network's nine stations and three translators in New York were donated to Northwestern Media. One of the Sound of Life stations, WSSK in Saratoga Springs, ceased operations on April 28, 2024, as its tower was demolished following a truck damaging its guy wires; Northwestern Media turned in its license in April 2025.

== Stations ==
=== Faith Network ===
Faith Network stations
| Call sign | Frequency | City of license | ERP Watts | Class | FCC info | Rebroadcasts |
|---|---|---|---|---|---|---|
| KTIS | 900 AM | Minneapolis, Minnesota | 50,000-D/500-N | B | FCC (KTIS) | KTIS |
| K206DI | 89.1 FM | Mankato, Minnesota | 250 | D | FCC (K206DI) | KTIS |
| K214DF (Note: Translator owned by the Educational Media Foundation) | 90.7 FM | Golden Valley-Minneapolis, Minnesota | 99 | D | FCC (K214DF) | KTIS |
| K264CD | 100.7 FM | Des Moines, Iowa | 99 | D | FCC (K264CD) | KTIS |
| K215DU | 90.9 FM | Hutchinson, Minnesota | 230 | D | FCC (K215DU) | KTIS |
| W248CU | 97.5 FM | Minneapolis-St. Paul, Minnesota | 250 | D | FCC (W248CU) | KTIS |
| K277CC | 103.3 FM | Pennock–Willmar, Minnesota | 170 | D | FCC (K277CC) | KTIS |
| WNWW (Note: Full-power simulcast of KTIS AM) | 1290 AM | West Hartford, Connecticut | 490-D/11-N | D | FCC (WNWW) | KTIS |
| W231CZ | 94.1 FM | Hartford, Connecticut | 32 | D | FCC (W231CZ) | WNWW |
| KNWS | 1090 AM | Waterloo, Iowa | 1,000-D/0-N | D | FCC (KNWS) | KNWS |
| K226CK | 93.1 FM | Waterloo, Iowa | 250 | D | FCC (K226CK) | KNWS |
| KDNI | 90.5 FM | Duluth, Minnesota | 2,000 | C3 | FCC (KDNI) | KDNI |
| K254DS | 98.7 FM | Grand Rapids, Minnesota | 250 | D | FCC (K254DS) | KDNI |
| K207ES | 89.3 FM | Hibbing, Minnesota | 12 | D | | KDNI |
| K220BI | 91.9 FM | Grand Marais, Minnesota | 34 | D | FCC (K220BI) | KDNI |
| KLBF | 89.1 FM | Lincoln-Bismarck, North Dakota | 2,300 | C3 | FCC (KLBF) | KTIS |
| K205GG | 88.9 FM | Grand Rapids, Minnesota | 250 | D | FCC (K205GG) | KLBF |
| KFNW | 1200 AM | West Fargo, North Dakota | 50,000-D/13,000-N | B | FCC (KFNW) | KFNW |
| K273DJ | 102.5 FM | West Fargo, North Dakota | 250 | D | FCC (K273DJ) | KFNW |
| KNWC | 1270 AM | Sioux Falls, South Dakota | 5,000-D/2,300-N | B | FCC (KNWC) | KNWC |
| K208EX | 89.5 FM | Brandon, South Dakota | 230>100(CP) | D | FCC (K208EX) | KNWC |
| K288EV | 105.5 FM | Brookings, South Dakota | 250 | D | FCC (K288EV) | KNWC |
| K288GA | 105.5 FM | Sioux Falls, South Dakota | 220 | D | FCC (K288GA) | KNWC |
| K298CY | 107.5 FM | Sioux Falls, South Dakota | 250 | D | FCC (K298CY) | KNWC |
| WNWC | 1190 AM | Sun Prairie-Madison, Wisconsin | 4,800-D/21-N | D | FCC (WNWC) | WNWC |
| W284CW | 104.7 FM | Madison, Wisconsin | 250 | D | FCC (W284CW) | WNWC |
| KLMP | 88.3 FM | Rapid City, South Dakota | 63,000 | C | FCC (KLMP) | KLMP |
| KLMP-FM1 | 88.3 FM | Rapid City, South Dakota | 2,300 | D | FCC (KLMP-FM1) | KLMP |
| KCKP | 100.9 FM | Laurie, Missouri | 23,500 | C3 | FCC (KCKP) | |
| KCKV | 91.9 FM | Kirksville, Missouri | 1,000 | A | FCC (KCKV) | |
| K207AY | 89.3 FM | St. Robert, Missouri | 99 | D | FCC (K207AY) | KCKP |
| K211FV | 90.1 FM | Sedalia, Missouri | 54 | D | FCC (K211FV) | KCKP |
| K285FC | 104.9 FM | Jefferson City, Missouri | 250 | D | FCC (K285FC) | KCKP |
| KURL | 93.3 FM | Billings, Montana | 60,000 | C1 | FCC (KURL) | |

=== Life Network ===
Life Network stations
| Call sign | Frequency | City of license | ERP Watts | Class | FCC info | Rebroadcasts |
|---|---|---|---|---|---|---|
| KTIS-FM | 98.5 FM | Minneapolis, Minnesota | 100,000 | C0 | FCC (KTIS-FM) | KTIS-FM |
| K224DB | 92.7 FM | Willmar, Minnesota | 170 | D | FCC (K224DB) | KTIS-FM |
| K232EK | 94.3 FM | Rochester, Minnesota | 115 | D | FCC (K232EK) | KTIS-FM |
| K235BH | 94.9 FM | Mankato, Minnesota | 250 | D | FCC (K235BH) | KTIS-FM |
| K270DZ | 101.9 FM | New Ulm, Minnesota | 250 | D | FCC (K270DZ) | KTIS-FM |
| K299AL | 107.7 FM | Albert Lea, Minnesota | 250 | D | FCC (K299AL) | KTIS-FM |
| KNWI | 107.1 FM | Osceola-Des Moines, Iowa | 100,000 | C1 | FCC (KNWI) | KNWI |
| KNWM (Note: Full-power simulcast of KNWI) | 96.1 FM | Madrid-Ames, Iowa | 6,000 | A | FCC (KNWM) | KNWI |
| KNWS-FM | 101.9 FM | Waterloo, Iowa | 100,000 | C | FCC (KNWS-FM) | KNWS-FM |
| K242BX | 96.3 FM | Marshalltown, Iowa | 250 | D | FCC (K242BX) | KNWS-FM |
| K245AZ | 96.9 FM | Dubuque, Iowa | 170 | D | FCC (K245AZ) | KNWS-FM |
| K261DH | 100.1 FM | Iowa City, Iowa | 47 | D | FCC (K261DH) | KNWS-FM |
| KDNW | 97.3 FM | Duluth, Minnesota | 72,000 | C1 | FCC (KDNW) | KDNW |
| KRFG (Note: Full-power simulcast of KDNW) | 102.9 FM | Nashwauk-Hibbing, Minnesota | 25,000 | C3 | FCC (KRFG) | KDNW |
| WJRF | 89.5 FM | Duluth, Minnesota | 1,650>40,000(CP) | A>C1(CP) | FCC (WJRF) | KDNW |
| KDGR | 88.1 FM | Grand Rapids, Minnesota | 5,000 | A | FCC (KDGR) | KDNW |
| W230AN | 93.9 FM | Hayward, Wisconsin | 250 | D | FCC (W230AN) | KDNW |
| W220EB | 91.9 FM | Ashland, Wisconsin | 38 | D | | KDNW |
| W268AT | 101.5 FM | Spooner, Wisconsin | 19 | D | FCC (W268AT) | KDNW |
| K288BF | 105.5 FM | Grand Marais, Minnesota | 122 | D | FCC (K288BF) | KDNW |
| KJNW | 88.5 FM | Kansas City, Missouri | 100,000 | C1 | FCC (KJNW) | KJNW |
| KSJI (Note: Former affiliate of Spirit FM (KCVO)) | 91.1 FM | Saint Joseph, Missouri | 14,000 | C3 | FCC (KSJI) | KJNW |
| KGBI-FM | 100.7 FM | Omaha, Nebraska | 100,000 | C0 | FCC (KGBI-FM) | KGBI-FM |
| KFNW-FM | 97.9 FM | Fargo, North Dakota | 100,000 | C | | KFNW-FM |
| K230AS | 93.9 FM | Fergus Falls, Minnesota | 250 | D | FCC (K230AS) | KFNW-FM |
| KNWC-FM | 96.5 FM | Sioux Falls, South Dakota | 100,000 | C | FCC (KNWC-FM) | KNWC-FM |
| KRGM (Note: Full-power simulcast of KNWC-FM) | 89.9 FM | Marshall-Redwood Falls, Minnesota | 4,250 | C3 | FCC (KRGM) | KNWC-FM |
| K208FJ | 89.5 FM | Fairmont, Minnesota | 250 | D | | KNWC-FM |
| K210CG | 89.9 FM | Spirit Lake, Iowa | 250 | D | FCC (K210CG) | KNWC-FM |
| K220HY | 91.9 FM | Spencer, Iowa | 250 | D | FCC (K220HY) | KNWC-FM |
| K257CH | 99.3 FM | Estherville, Iowa | 80 | D | FCC (K257CH) | KNWC-FM |
| K220IT | 91.9 FM | Watertown, South Dakota | 50 | D | FCC (K220IT) | KNWC-FM |
| K229BK | 93.7 FM | North Sioux City, South Dakota | 250 | D | FCC (K229BK) | KNWC-FM |
| K231AR | 94.1 FM | Mitchell, South Dakota | 250 | D | FCC (K231AR) | KNWC-FM |
| WNWC-FM | 102.5 FM | Madison, Wisconsin | 50,000 | B | FCC (WNWC-FM) | WNWC-FM |
| W237CO | 95.3 FM | Richland Center, Wisconsin | 10 | D | FCC (W237CO) | WNWC-FM |
| KSLT | 107.1 FM | Spearfish, South Dakota | 100,000 | C | FCC (W237CO) | KSLT |
| KSLT-FM1 | 107.1 FM | Rapid City, South Dakota | 2,400 | D | FCC (KSLT-FM1) | KSLT |
| KSLP (Note: Full-power simulcast of KSLT) | 90.3 FM | Fort Pierre, South Dakota | 2,000 | A | FCC (KSLP) | KSLT |
| KSLS (Note: Full-power simulcast of KSLT) | 90.7 FM | Dickinson, North Dakota | 3,400 | A | FCC (KSLS) | KSLT |
| K292DN | 106.3 FM | Newcastle, Wyoming | 31 | D | FCC (K292DN) | KSLT |

=== Spirit FM ===
| Call sign | Frequency | City of license | ERP W | Height m (ft) | Class | FCC info |
|---|---|---|---|---|---|---|
| KCVY | 89.9 FM | Cabool, Missouri | 10,500 | 151 m (495 ft) | C3 | FCC (KCVY) |
| KCVO-FM | 91.7 FM | Camdenton, Missouri | 10,000 | 133 m (436 ft) | C3 | FCC (KCVO-FM) |
| KCKE | 90.3 FM | Chillicothe, Missouri | 32,000 | 82 m (269 ft) | C2 | FCC (KCKE) |
| KCKF | 91.9 FM | Cuba, Missouri | 5,000 | 76 m (249 ft) | A | FCC (KCKF) |
| KCVZ | 92.1 FM | Dixon, Missouri | 6,000 | 100 m (330 ft) | A | FCC (KCVZ) |
| KVSR | 90.7 FM | Kirksville, Missouri | 50,000 | 143 m (469 ft) | C1 | FCC (KVSR) |
| KCVQ | 89.7 FM | Knob Noster, Missouri | 7,700 | 70 m (230 ft) | C3 | FCC (KCVQ) |
| KCKH | 95.9 FM | Mansfield, Missouri | 8,900 | 165 m (541 ft) | C3 | FCC (KCKH) |
| KCKZ | 103.5 FM | Moberly, Missouri | 50,000 | 102 m (335 ft) | C2 | FCC (KCKZ) |
| KCVJ | 100.3 FM | Osceola, Missouri | 6,000 | 86 m (282 ft) | A | FCC (KCVJ) |
| KCVK | 107.7 FM | Otterville, Missouri | 3,700 | 125 m (410 ft) | A | FCC (KCVK) |
| KCVX | 91.7 FM | Salem, Missouri | 30,000 | 64 m (210 ft) | C2 | FCC (KCVX) |

==== Low power translators ====
| Call sign | Frequency | City of license | FID | ERP (W) | HAAT | Class | FCC info |
|---|---|---|---|---|---|---|---|
| K293AX | 106.5 FM | Jefferson City, Missouri | 154612 | 85 | 85 m (279 ft) | D | LMS |
| K281AT | 104.1 FM | Lebanon, Missouri | 152452 | 92 | 122.3 m (401 ft) | D | LMS |
| K254BU | 98.7 FM | Marshall, Missouri | 140750 | 10 | 29 m (95 ft) | D | LMS |
| K246DD | 97.1 FM | Rolla, Missouri | 36254 | 140 | 42.7 m (140 ft) | D | LMS |
| K208BO | 89.5 FM | Warsaw, Missouri | 36247 | 15 | 67 m (220 ft) | D | LMS |

=== Sound of Life ===
| Call sign | Frequency | City of license | Facility ID | Class | ERP W | Height m (ft) | Transmitter coordinates | Call sign meaning | Former call signs |
|---|---|---|---|---|---|---|---|---|---|
| WFGB | 89.7 FM | Kingston, New York | 60896 | B | 3,100 | 453 m (1,486 ft) | 42°4′35.3″N 74°6′24.5″W | — | — |
| WLJH | 90.7 FM | Glens Falls, New York | 77582 | A | 40 | 404 m (1,325 ft) | 43°25′12.3″N 73°45′35.4″W | — | WARD (3/21-8/15/1997) |
| WGKR | 105.3 FM | Grand Gorge, New York | 60904 | A | 60 | 414 m (1,358 ft) | 42°23′55.2″N 74°35′21.5″W | — | — |
| WHVP | 91.1 FM | Hudson, New York | 60899 | A | 220 | 318 m (1,043 ft) | 42°18′28.3″N 73°29′33.4″W | Hudson Valley | WQFA (11/15/1991-6/1/1992) |
| WGWR | 88.1 FM | Liberty, New York | 79020 | A | 38 | 246 m (807 ft) | 41°48′4.2″N 74°47′3.5″W | — | — |
| WLJP | 89.3 FM | Monroe, New York | 60900 | A | 1,600 | 283 m (928 ft) | 41°22′44.2″N 74°8′12.1″W | — | — |
| WPGL | 90.7 FM | Pattersonville, New York | 60890 | A | 27 | 221 m (725 ft) | 42°50′53.4″N 74°4′13.3″W | — | WLGZ (2/26-12/20/1993) |
| WRPJ | 88.9 FM | Port Jervis, New York | 60889 | A | 500 | 180 m (590 ft) | 41°25′36.3″N 74°34′52.5″W | Radio Port Jervis | — |
| W235AY | 94.9 FM | Albany, New York | 60892 | D | 250 | 274.3 m (900 ft) | 42°38′13.3″N 73°59′49.5″W | | — |
| W229BH | 93.7 FM | Newburgh, New York | 81887 | D | 10 | 288.5 m (947 ft) | 41°29′32″N 73°58′38″W | | — |
| W206AW | 89.1 FM | Pawling, New York | 91575 | D | 250 | 212 m (696 ft) | 41°42′50.3″N 73°32′5.4″W | | — |

=== New Life Media Network ===
| Call sign | Frequency | City of license | ERP Watts | Class | FCC info | Rebroadcasts |
|---|---|---|---|---|---|---|
| WCIC | 91.5 FM | Pekin-Peoria, Illinois | 47,000 | B | FCC (WCIC) | WCIC |
| WSCT (Note: Full-power simulcast of WCIC) | 90.1 FM | Springfield, Illinois | 3,800 | A | FCC (WSCT) | WCIC |
| WPRC | 88.7 FM | Sheffield, Illinois | 8,500 | B1 | FCC (WPRC) | WCIC |
| W212AN | 90.3 FM | Jacksonville, Illinois | 55 | D | FCC (W212AN) | WSCT |
| W219DV | 91.7 FM | Jacksonville, Illinois | 38 | D | FCC (W219DV) | WSCT |
| W255AI | 98.9 FM | Bloomington, Illinois | 55 | D | FCC (W255AI) | WCIC |
| W263AO | 100.5 FM | Galesburg, Illinois | 19 | D | FCC (W263AO) | WCIC |
| K247BW | 97.3 FM | Bettendorf, Iowa | 40 | D | FCC (K247BW) | WPRC |
| WBGL | 91.7 FM | Champaign, Illinois | 20,000 | B | FCC (WBGL) | WBGL |
| WCFL (Note: Full-power simulcast of WBGL) | 104.7 FM | Morris, Illinois | 50,000 | B | FCC (WCFL) | WBGL |
| WIBI | 91.1 FM | Carlinville, Illinois | 50,000 | B | FCC (WIBI) | WBGL |
| WNLD | 88.1 FM | Decatur, Illinois | 1,000 | A | FCC (WNLD) | WBGL |
| WZGL | 88.1 FM | Charleston, Illinois | 2,100 | A | FCC (WZGL) | WBGL |
| WCRT-FM | 88.5 FM | Terre Haute, Indiana | 1,050 | A | FCC (WCRT-FM) | WBGL |
| WCBW-FM | 89.7 FM | East St. Louis, Illinois | 250 | A | FCC (WCBW-FM) | WBGL |
| WBMV | 89.7 FM | Mount Vernon, Illinois | 10,500 | B1 | FCC (WBMV) | WBGL |
| WVNL | 91.7 FM | Vandalia, Illinois | 100 | A | FCC (WVNL) | WBGL |
| WIMB | 89.1 FM | Murphysboro, Illinois | 3,500 | A | FCC (WIMB) | WBGL |
| W211AD | 90.1 FM | Granite City, Illinois | 60 | D | FCC (W211AD) | WIBI |
| W230BS | 93.9 FM | Effingham, Illinois | 38 | D | FCC (W230BS) | WBMV |
| K295FB | 106.9 FM | Cape Girardeau, Missouri | 92 | D | FCC (K295FB) | WBMV |
