= WJRF =

Christian radio station in Duluth, Minnesota

Coordinates: 46.789°N 92.119°W

Simulcasts WRVM Suring

Duluth, Minnesota; United States
- Broadcast area: Duluth-Superior
- Frequency: 89.5 MHz
- Branding: Voice of the Master

Programming
- Format: Christian radio

Ownership
- Owner: WRVM, Inc.

History
- Former call signs: WNCB (1982–2004)
- Call sign meaning: Jesus (is the) ReFuge (former branding)

Technical information
- Licensing authority: FCC
- Facility ID: 49348
- Class: A > C1 (CP)
- ERP: 1,650 watts > 40,000 watts (CP)
- HAAT: 168 > 223 (CP) meters

Links
- Public license information: Public file; LMS
- Website: wrvm.org

WJRF (89.5 FM) is a radio station in Duluth, Minnesota. The station currently simulcasts Christian radio station WRVM in Suring, Wisconsin. Historically, it was its own station and the centerpiece of a regional Christian network prior to its donation to Northwestern Media in 2019.

== History ==
The WJRF license was authorized in 1982 as WNCB. It was owned by North-Central Christian Broadcasting. WNCB moved from 89.1 to 89.3 MHz in 1992 and to 89.5 in 2002. In the early 1990s, it began to build out a translator network, including a short-lived venture into the Twin Cities that was forced off the air by a relocated full-power station.

Shortly after the move to 89.5, North-Central Christian Broadcasting renamed itself Refuge Media Group. The WJRF call letters were adopted in 2004. In the early 2010s, several Refuge translators were sold off to commercial broadcasters to retransmit AM stations.

Former logo

On July 2, 2019, Refuge Media Group filed to donate the entire network of three main stations and 13 Refuge-owned translators to the University of Northwestern – St. Paul, which disbanded the network and used its frequencies (except WJRF) to broadcast other Northwestern stations in its Life and Faith networks. Refuge-operated translators owned by third parties, such as Minn-Iowa Christian Broadcasting, were not included in the transaction.

In February 2020, WJRF was granted a construction permit by the FCC, to improve its signal from a class A station using 1,650 watts of power to a class C1 station using 40,000 watts of power.

On May 5, 2025, the University of Northwestern – St. Paul applied to sell WJRF and its technical equipment to WRVM, Inc. for $150,000. WRVM operates a Christian radio network with six full-power FM stations and 25 FM translators in northeastern Wisconsin and Upper Michigan. The purchase closed on July 18.

On July 21, 2025, WJRF switched to the Voice of the Master network programming.

== Translators ==
In operation, Refuge had 13 translators at the end of its life, as well as two full-power licenses outside of Duluth, KRGM in Marshall and KRFG in Nashwauk. These stations became full-power repeaters of Northwestern Media Life stations, and the translators were divided among Northwestern's existing Life and Faith stations.

The following translators were not owned by Refuge Media Group and thus not part of the donation of the network. The Estherville translator repeats off-air a translator reassigned to a Northwestern station and is being donated to Northwestern as of February 2020.

Call sign	Frequency	City of license	FID	ERP (W)	HAAT	Class	FCC info
K257CH	(99.3 (Note: Owned by Lakes Area Christian Radio. Received WJRF from K210CG, which now rebroadcasts KNWC-FM.)) FM	Estherville, Iowa	83434	80	53 m (174 ft)	D	LMS
K218DK	(91.5 (Note: Owned by Minn-Iowa Christian Broadcasting)) FM	Bloomington, Minnesota	49352	216	49 m (161 ft)	D	LMS
K293BA	(106.5 (Note: Owned by Minn-Iowa Christian Broadcasting. Received WJRF from K218DK.)) FM	Elko, Minnesota	138094	196	83 m (272 ft)	D	LMS
K212FM	(90.3 (Note: Owned by Heartland Christian Broadcasters, Inc.)) FM	Warroad, Minnesota	84774	250	53 m (174 ft)	D	LMS
