= KNWS =

KNWS may refer to:

- KNWS (AM), a radio station (1090 AM) licensed to Waterloo, Iowa, United States
- KNWS-FM, a radio station (101.9 FM) licensed to Waterloo, Iowa, United States
- KNWS-LD, a television station (channel 27, virtual 64) licensed to Brownsville, Texas, United States
- KYAZ, a television station (channel 47/PSIP 51) licensed to Katy, Texas, United States, which used the call sign KNWS-TV from 1993 to 2010
