= KNWI =

Contemporary Christian radio station in Osceola–Des Moines, Iowa

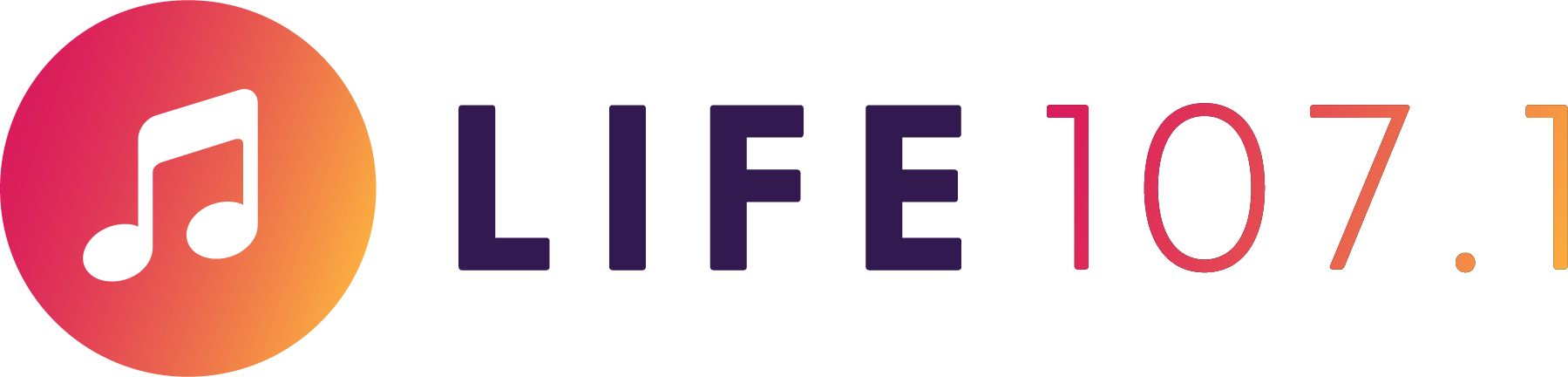
- Osceola, Iowa; United States
- Broadcast area: Des Moines metropolitan area
- Frequency: 107.1 MHz (HD Radio)
- Branding: Life 107.1

Programming
- Language: English
- Format: Christian adult contemporary
- Subchannels: HD2: Faith Radio (Christian talk and teaching)

Ownership
- Owner: Northwestern Media; (University of Northwestern - St. Paul)
- Sister stations: KNWM

History
- First air date: October 1, 1982
- Call sign meaning: Northwestern Iowa

Technical information
- Licensing authority: FCC
- Facility ID: 37454
- Class: C1
- ERP: 100,000 watts
- HAAT: 193 meters (633 ft)
- Transmitter coordinates: 41°09′06″N 94°02′42″W
- Translator: HD2: 100.7 K264CD (Des Moines)

Links
- Public license information: Public file; LMS
- Webcast: Listen live
- Website: www.life1071.com

Simulcast
- KNWM
- Madrid, Iowa; United States
- Broadcast area: Ames-Des Moines
- Frequency: 96.1 MHz

Ownership
- Owner: Northwestern Media; (University of Northwestern – St. Paul)

History
- First air date: 1997 (as KEZF)
- Former call signs: KEZF (1997); KLRX (1997–2004)
- Call sign meaning: Northwestern Media

Technical information
- Facility ID: 42083
- Class: A
- ERP: 6,000 watts
- HAAT: 100 meters (330 ft)
- Transmitter coordinates: 41°51′05″N 93°43′30″W

Links
- Public license information: Public file; LMS

KNWI (107.1 FM, "Life 107.1") is a Christian adult contemporary radio station, licensed to Osceola, Iowa, and serving the Des Moines metropolitan area. It is owned and operated by University of Northwestern – St. Paul in Roseville, Minnesota, a religious university which owns a chain of radio stations around the U.S. KNWI also simulcasts on KNWM (96.1 FM) in Madrid, Iowa.

== History ==
The station first signed on the air on October 1, 1982. The call sign was KJJC and the station played country music. It was owned by J. B. Broadcasting, Inc. and it was only powered at 3,000 watts, unable to be heard in the larger Des Moines radio market. In the late 90s and early 2000s, the stations ran a Sports talk format.

== Signal upgrades ==
Despite targeting Des Moines for decades, the city was outside the station's city-grade contour. In 2018, UNW proposed a modification to KNWI to upgrade it to 100 kW from a tower near Winterset. The move required KDSN-FM 107.1 in Denison to move to 104.9; in order to assure approval, UNW Northwestern subsidiary UNW Media Holdings LLC reached an agreement to buy KDSN-FM and its associated AM KDSN 1530 from Mikadety Radio Corporation for $1.25 million. (In September 2018, UNW Media divested the KDSN stations to JC Van Ginkel, James Field, & Rodney Christensen's Crawford County Broadcasting for $1.15 million.) The frequency changes were approved by the FCC on August 12, 2019. In October 2021, KNWI officially made the upgrade to 100,000 watts, and as a result, KNWM briefly dropped the KNWI simulcast.
