= KTIS =

KTIS may refer to:

- KTIS (AM), a radio station (900 AM) licensed to Minneapolis, Minnesota, United States
- KTIS-FM, a radio station (98.5 FM) licensed to Minneapolis, Minnesota, United States
