= KFNW =

KFNW may refer to:

- KFNW (AM), a radio station (1200 AM) licensed to West Fargo, North Dakota, United States
- KFNW-FM, a radio station (97.9 FM) licensed to Fargo, North Dakota, United States
