= WNWC =

WNWC may refer to:

- WNWC-FM, a radio station (102.5 FM) licensed to Madison, Wisconsin, United States
- WNWC (AM), a radio station (1190 AM) licensed to Sun Prairie, Wisconsin, United States
