= KNWC =

KNWC may refer to:

- KNWC (AM), AM 1270 in Sioux Falls, South Dakota
- KNWC-FM, 96.5 FM in Sioux Falls, South Dakota
