= KDNW =

Contemporary Christian music radio station in Duluth, Minnesota

Coordinates: 46.789°N 92.118°W

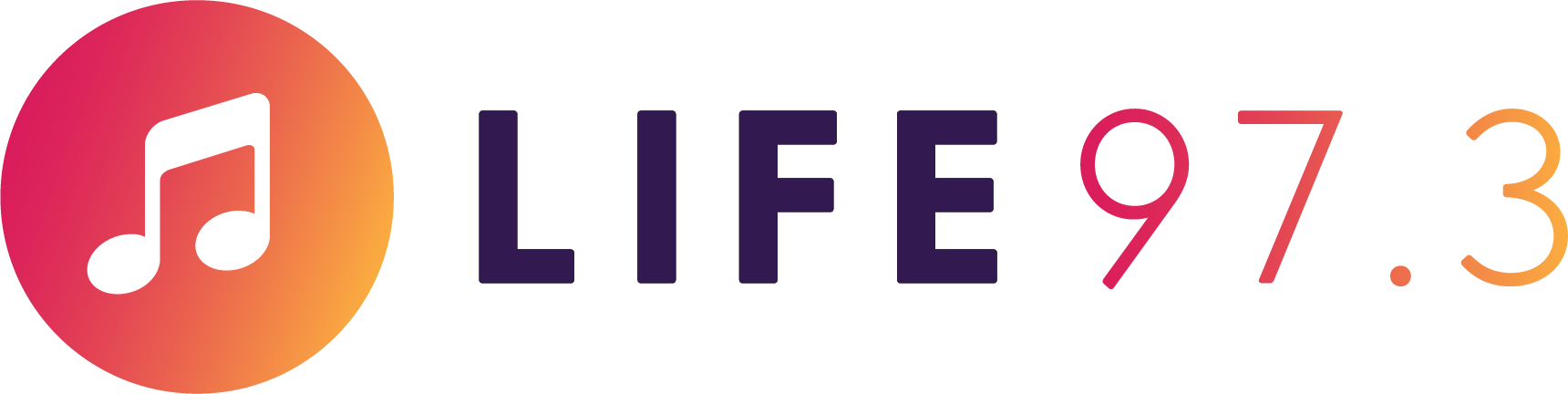
- Duluth, Minnesota; United States
- Broadcast area: Duluth-Superior
- Frequency: 97.3 MHz
- Branding: Life 97.3

Programming
- Format: Christian adult contemporary

Ownership
- Owner: Northwestern Media; (University of Northwestern-St. Paul)
- Sister stations: Duluth: KDNI; Hibbing: KRFG (FM)

History
- First air date: 1993; 33 years ago
- Call sign meaning: K Duluth NorthWestern College

Technical information
- Licensing authority: FCC
- Facility ID: 49797
- Class: C1
- ERP: 72,000 watts
- HAAT: 168 m (551 ft)
- Translator: see below

Links
- Public license information: Public file; LMS
- Webcast: Listen live
- Website: life973.com

KDNW (97.3 FM, "Life 97.3") is a Christian adult contemporary music radio station located in Duluth, Minnesota, owned and operated by Northwestern Media, a ministry of the University of Northwestern-St. Paul, a Christian university in Roseville, Minnesota.

Former logo

KDNW is a non-profit radio station, receiving most of its donations and contributions from its listeners. The station is also rebroadcast on several full powered stations and translators (low-powered rebroadcasters) outside of its main listening area.

== Translators ==
Call sign	Frequency	City of license	FID	ERP (W)	HAAT	Class	FCC info
KRFG	102.9 FM	Nashwauk, Minnesota	68633	25,000	77 m (253 ft)	C3	LMS
WDNW	91.9 FM	Ashland, Wisconsin	763947	4,500	103 m (338 ft)	A	LMS
KDGR	88.1 FM	Grand Rapids, Minnesota	763944	5,000	55 m (180 ft)	A	LMS

Broadcast translator for KDNW-FM
Call sign	Frequency	City of license	FID	ERP (W)	Class	FCC info
K205GG	88.9 FM	Grand Rapids, Minnesota	140253	250	D	LMS
W230AN	93.9 FM	Hayward, Wisconsin	86422	250	D	LMS
W268AT	101.5 FM	Spooner, Wisconsin	138580	19	D	LMS
K288BF	105.5 FM	Grand Marais, Minnesota	63341	122	D	LMS
