= KDSN =

KDSN may refer to:

- KDSN (AM), a radio station (1530 AM) licensed to Denison, Iowa, United States
- KDSN-FM, a radio station (104.9 FM) licensed to Denison, Iowa, United States
