= KNWS-FM =

Contemporary Christian music radio station in Waterloo, Iowa

Coordinates: 42.401°N 91.844°W

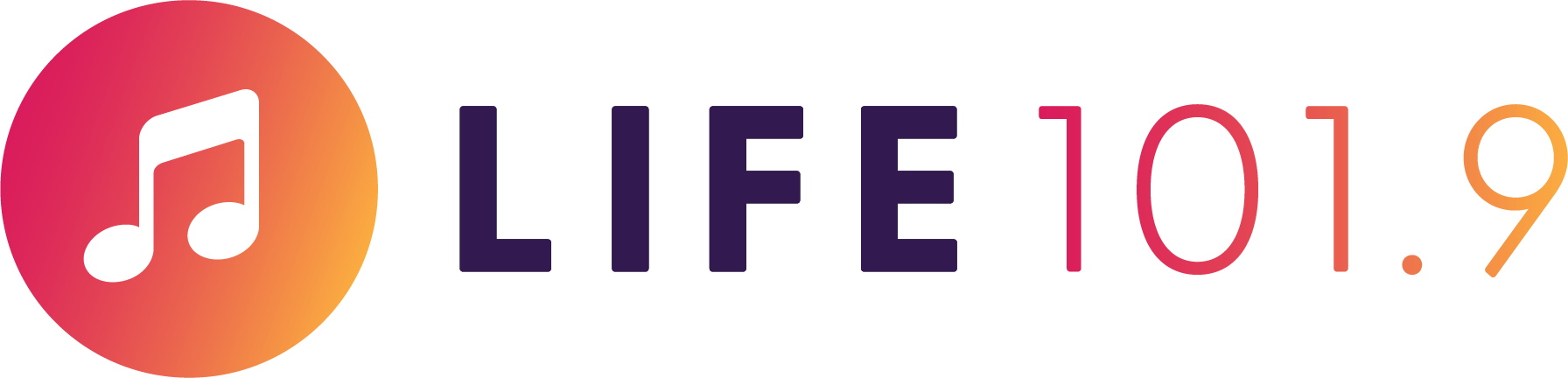
- Waterloo, Iowa; United States
- Broadcast area: Waterloo/Cedar Rapids/Iowa City/Dubuque
- Frequency: 101.9 MHz
- Branding: Life 101.9

Programming
- Format: Christian adult contemporary

Ownership
- Owner: Northwestern Media; (University of Northwestern - St Paul)
- Sister stations: KNWS

History
- First air date: 1965
- Call sign meaning: Northwestern College

Technical information
- Facility ID: 49786
- Class: C
- ERP: 100,000 watts
- HAAT: 479 meters (1,572 ft)

Links
- Website: life1019.com

KNWS-FM (101.9 MHz), also known as Life 101.9, is a radio station in Waterloo, Iowa, United States, owned and operated by Northwestern Media, a ministry of the University of Northwestern - St Paul in Roseville, Minnesota, and supported by donations from the local community.

Life 101.9 broadcasts Christian adult contemporary music. Its signal covers Waterloo, Cedar Rapids, Iowa City and surrounding areas in eastern Iowa. A live stream is available on the Life 101.9 website, mobile app and on Amazon smart speakers. The station also broadcasts its programming on translator stations K245AZ, serving Dubuque at 96.9FM; and, K242BX, serving Marshalltown at 96.3 FM.

The radio station broadcasts commercial-free contemporary Christian music 24 hours a day. David A. Dein hosts the Morning Show from 6-10am weekdays. Other station personalities include Jessie Browning, Ashley Owens, and Seth Baron.

Life 101.9 is active in the community and encourages listeners to help other non-profit organizations in Eastern Iowa on a regular basis.

Life 101.9's sister station, Faith Radio, broadcasts a Christian talk and teaching format.

== Translators ==
Broadcast translators for KNWS-FM
Call sign	Frequency	City of license	FID	ERP (W)	Class	FCC info
K245AZ	96.9 FM	Dubuque, Iowa	152221	170	D	LMS
K232EK	96.3 FM	Marshalltown, Iowa	139123	250	D	LMS
