= KDNI =

Faith Radio station in Duluth, Minnesota

Coordinates: 46.789°N 92.114°W

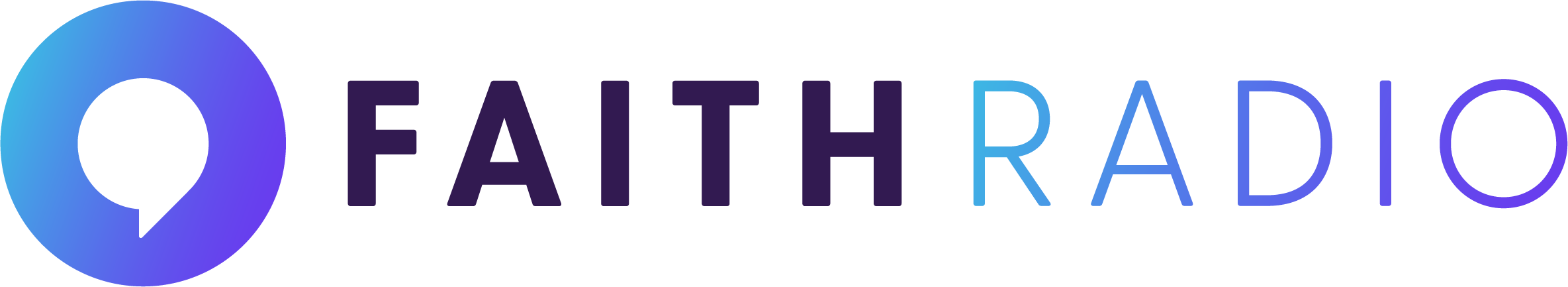
- Duluth, Minnesota; United States
- Broadcast area: Duluth-Superior
- Frequency: 90.5 MHz
- Branding: Faith 90.5, Faith Radio

Programming
- Format: Christian talk and teaching
- Affiliations: Northwestern Media's Faith Network

Ownership
- Owner: Northwestern Media; (University of Northwestern - St Paul)
- Sister stations: Duluth: KDNW; Hibbing: KRFG (FM)

Technical information
- Licensing authority: FCC
- Facility ID: 49768
- Class: C3
- ERP: 2,000 watts
- HAAT: 222 m (728 ft)

Links
- Public license information: Public file; LMS

KDNI (90.5 FM), known on-air as Faith 90.5 FM, or by the network name Faith Radio, is a radio station in Duluth, Minnesota, owned and operated by University of Northwestern - St Paul and is a non-profit, listener-supported radio station relying on donations from the local community throughout the year. It covers Duluth-Superior and surrounding areas in Minnesota and Wisconsin.

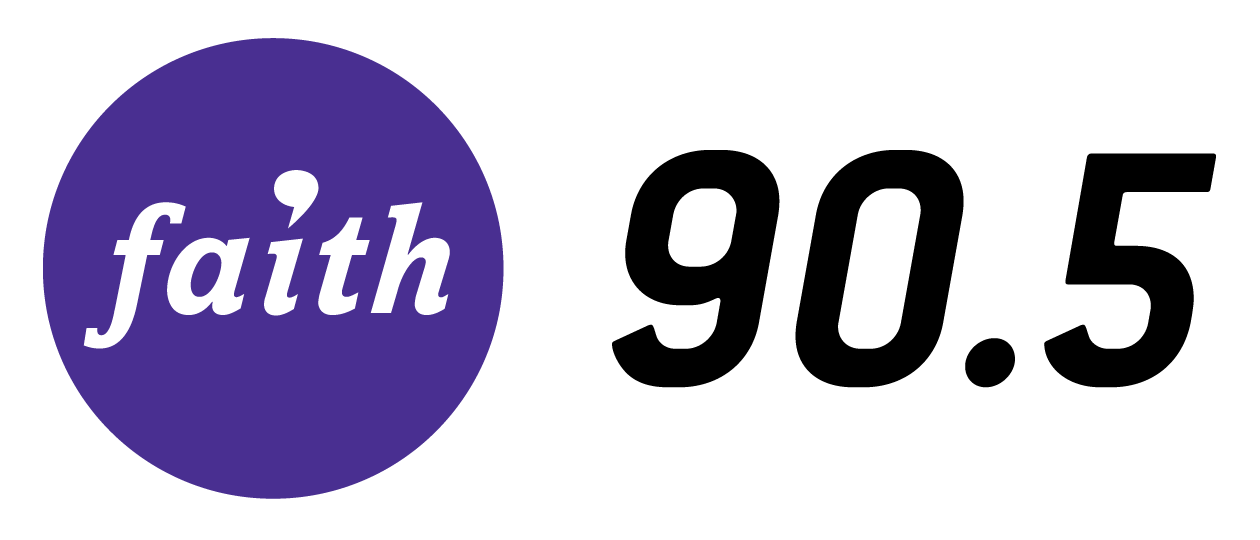
Former logo

Programming is nearly 100 percent satellite delivered and produced by Northwestern Media.

The format is mainly Christian talk and teaching, with programs such as Turning Point with David Jeremiah; Focus on the Family; Family Life Today with Dennis Rainey; Insight for Living with Chuck Swindoll; Living on the Edge with Chip Ingram; In Touch with Charles Stanley; Walk in the Word with James McDonald; Just Thinking with Ravi Zacharias; and others.

== Translators ==
Broadcast translators for KDNI-FM
Call sign	Frequency	City of license	FID	ERP (W)	Class	FCC info
K254DS	98.7 FM	Grand Rapids, Minnesota	142037	250	D	LMS
K220BI	91.9 FM	Grand Marais, Minnesota	49790	34	D	LMS
K202EO	88.3 FM	Hibbing, Minnesota	49769	27	D	LMS
