= KHGN =

KHGN may refer to:

- KHGN (FM), a radio station (106.7 FM) licensed to serve Hugoton, Kansas, United States
- KVSR, a radio station (90.7 FM) licensed to serve Kirksville, Missouri, United States, which held the call sign KHGN from 1996 to 2010
