= KFFW =

KFFW may refer to:

- KFFW-LP, a low-power radio station (107.7 FM) licensed to serve Atwater, California, United States
- KCVY, a radio station (89.9 FM) licensed to serve Cabool, Missouri, United States, which held the call sign KFFW from 2001 to 2008
