= KVLQ =

KVLQ may refer to:

- KVLQ (FM), a radio station (90.1 FM) licensed to serve La Pine, Oregon, United States
- KLBF, a radio station (89.1 FM) licensed to serve Lincoln, North Dakota, United States, which held the call sign KVLQ from 2003 to 2008
