= KCVJ =

- Osceola, Missouri; United States
- Frequency: 100.3 MHz
- Branding: Spirit FM

Programming
- Format: Christian Adult Contemporary
- Affiliations: Spirit FM

Ownership
- Owner: University of Northwestern – St. Paul

History
- Former call signs: KBUG (1990–1999)

Technical information
- Licensing authority: FCC
- Facility ID: 69666
- Class: A
- ERP: 6,000 watts
- HAAT: 86.0 meters (282.2 ft)
- Transmitter coordinates: 38°3′43.00″N 93°33′24.00″W

Links
- Public license information: Public file; LMS
- Webcast: Listen Live
- Website: spiritfm.org

KCVJ (100.3 FM) is a radio station licensed to Osceola, Missouri, United States. The station is an affiliate of Spirit FM, broadcasting a Christian Adult Contemporary format with a few Christian talk and teaching programs, and is currently owned by the University of Northwestern – St. Paul.

== History ==
The station was assigned the call sign KBUG on May 2, 1990. On April 29, 1999, the station changed its call sign to the current KCVJ.
