= KCVK =

- Otterville, Missouri; United States
- Frequency: 107.7 MHz
- Branding: Spirit FM

Programming
- Format: Christian Adult Contemporary
- Affiliations: Spirit FM

Ownership
- Owner: University of Northwestern – St. Paul

History
- Former call signs: KOTT (1998–2001)

Technical information
- Licensing authority: FCC
- Facility ID: 83870
- Class: A
- ERP: 3,700 watts
- HAAT: 125.0 meters (410.1 ft)
- Transmitter coordinates: 38°39′21.00″N 92°54′27.00″W
- Translator: 98.7 K254BU (Marshall)

Links
- Public license information: Public file; LMS
- Webcast: Listen Live
- Website: spiritfm.org

KCVK (107.7 FM) is a radio station licensed to Otterville, Missouri, United States. The station is an affiliate of Spirit FM, broadcasting a Christian Adult Contemporary format with a few Christian talk and teaching programs, and is currently owned by the University of Northwestern – St. Paul.

== History ==
The station was assigned the call sign KOTT on May 8, 1998. On October 23, 2001, the station changed its call sign to the current KCVK. On October 3, 2001, the station was sold to Lake Area Educational Broadcasting Foundation.

Effective July 5, 2023, the Lake Area Educational Broadcasting Foundation sold KCVK, fourteen sister stations, eight translators, and six construction permits to the University of Northwestern – St. Paul for $1.25 million.
