= KRFG (FM) =

Christian radio station in Nashwauk, Minnesota

Simulcasts KDNW Duluth
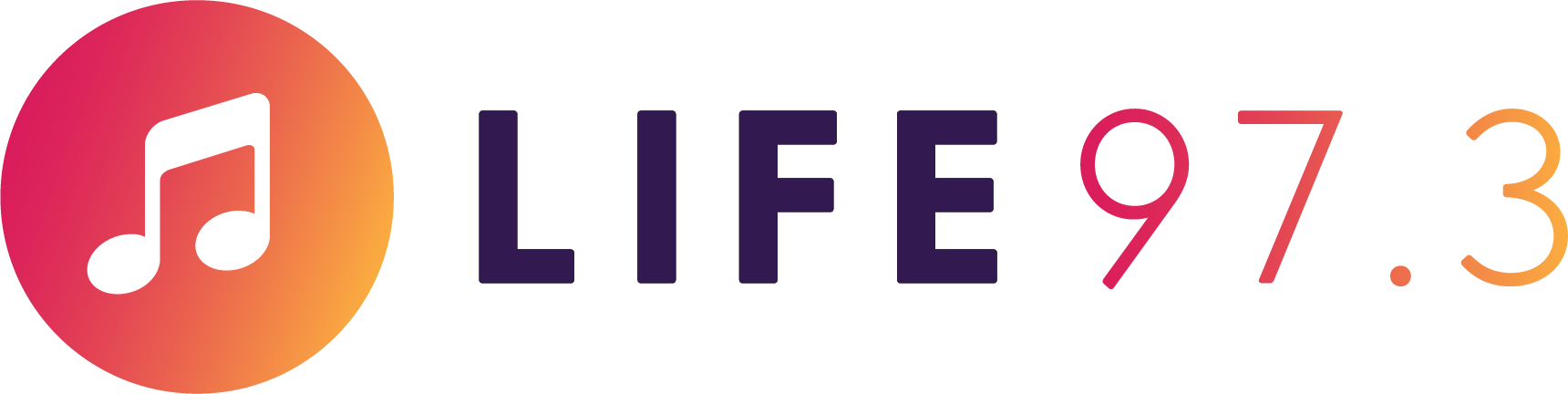
- Nashwauk, Minnesota; United States
- Broadcast area: Iron Range
- Frequency: 102.9 MHz
- Branding: Life 97.3

Programming
- Format: Christian adult contemporary
- Affiliations: Northwestern Media

Ownership
- Owner: University of Northwestern - St. Paul
- Sister stations: KDNI, KDNW

History
- First air date: 1997 (as KMFG)
- Former call signs: KMFG (1997–2016)
- Call sign meaning: K ReFuGe Radio (previous branding)

Technical information
- Licensing authority: FCC
- Facility ID: 68633
- Class: C3
- ERP: 25,000 watts
- HAAT: 77 meters (253 ft)
- Transmitter coordinates: 47°24′30″N 92°57′5″W
- Translator: 98.7 K254DS (Grand Rapids)

Links
- Public license information: Public file; LMS
- Website: life973.com

KRFG (102.9 MHz) is an FM radio station licensed to Nashwauk, Minnesota, USA, serving the Iron Range area. It is currently owned by the University of Northwestern - St. Paul following a donation in 2019.

== History ==
The station originally went on air with call letters KMFG and branded as "The Classic Rock Station". Previously, KRFG was owned by Midwest Communications. In 2016, it was sold to Refuge Media Group, the call letters changed to KRFG, and it was rebranded as "Refuge Radio", with a Christian AC format.

On July 2, 2019, Refuge Media Group filed to donate the entire network of three main stations and 13 Refuge-owned translators to the University of Northwestern – St. Paul, which operates a Christian Talk/Teaching/Instruction "Faith" network (two FM stations, six AM stations and seven translators in eight markets), and a Contemporary Christian "Life" network (ten FM stations and 19 translators in nine markets). Refuge-operated translators owned by a third party such as Minn-Iowa Christian Broadcasting were not included in the transaction.
