= WNWC-FM =

Radio station in Madison, Wisconsin

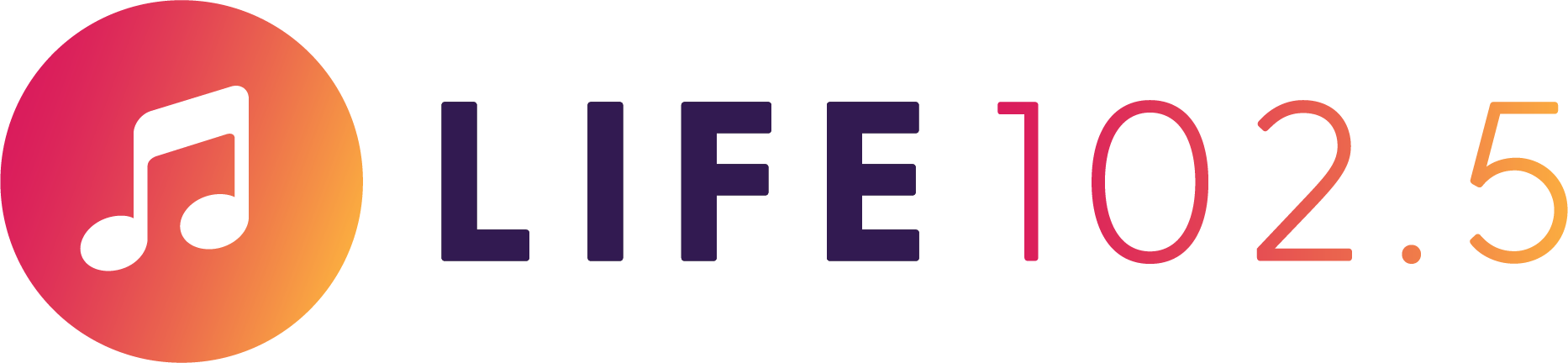
- Madison, Wisconsin; United States
- Frequency: 102.5 MHz (HD Radio)
- Branding: Life 102.5

Programming
- Format: Christian adult contemporary
- Subchannels: HD2: WNWC simulcast

Ownership
- Owner: Northwestern Media; (University of Northwestern – St. Paul)
- Sister stations: Faith Radio

History
- First air date: 1959
- Former call signs: WRVB-FM (1959–1973)
- Call sign meaning: The station's owner was formerly known as Northwestern College

Technical information
- Licensing authority: FCC
- Facility ID: 49781
- Class: B
- ERP: 50,000 watts
- HAAT: 150 meters (490 ft)
- Transmitter coordinates: 43°2′8.00″N 89°30′25.00″W
- Repeater: See § Translators

Links
- Public license information: Public file; LMS
- Website: life1025.com

WNWC-FM (102.5 FM, "Life 102.5") is an American radio station broadcasting a Christian adult contemporary music format. Licensed to Madison, Wisconsin, United States, "Life 102.5" has an AM sister station, "Faith 1190" (WNWC), that broadcasts programs on Christian faith. Both stations are currently owned by University of Northwestern – St. Paul and run by Northwestern Media, a ministry of UNWSP.

WNWC transmits from a tower in Elver Park on Madison's Southwest Side.

== Translators ==
In addition to the main station, WNWC-FM is relayed by an additional two broadcast translators to widen its coverage area.

Broadcast translator for WNWC-FM
Call sign	Frequency	City of license	FID	ERP (W)	Class	FCC info
W237CO	95.3 FM	Richland Center, Wisconsin	150577	10	D	LMS
