= KCVX =

- Salem, Missouri; United States
- Frequency: 91.7 MHz
- Branding: Spirit FM

Programming
- Format: Christian Adult Contemporary
- Affiliations: Spirit FM

Ownership
- Owner: University of Northwestern – St. Paul

History
- Former call signs: KYMR (2001–2003)

Technical information
- Licensing authority: FCC
- Facility ID: 92246
- Class: C2
- ERP: 30,000 watts
- HAAT: 64.0 meters (210.0 ft)
- Transmitter coordinates: 37°36′16.00″N 91°32′46.00″W

Links
- Public license information: Public file; LMS
- Webcast: Listen Live
- Website: spiritfm.org

KCVX (91.7 FM) is a radio station licensed to Salem, Missouri, United States. The station is an affiliate of Spirit FM, broadcasting a Christian Adult Contemporary format with a few Christian talk and teaching programs, and is currently owned by the University of Northwestern – St. Paul.

== History ==
The station was assigned the call sign KYMR on March 2, 2001. On September 24, 2003, the station changed its call sign to the current KCVX.
