= KFNW-FM =

Contemporary Christian music radio station in Fargo, North Dakota

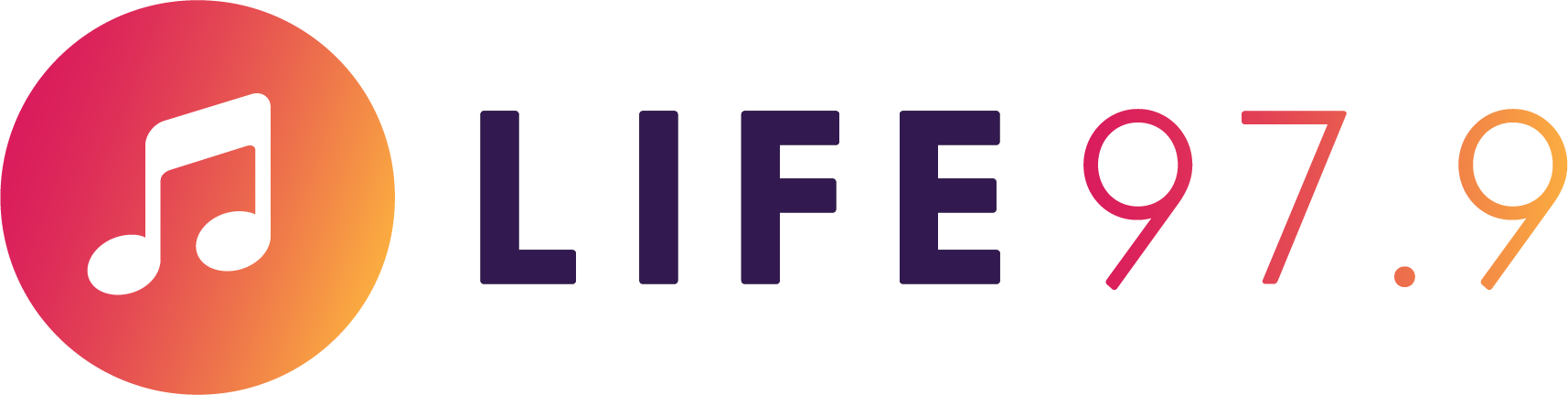
- Fargo, North Dakota; United States
- Broadcast area: Fargo-Moorhead
- Frequency: 97.9 MHz
- Branding: Life 97.9

Programming
- Format: Christian contemporary

Ownership
- Owner: Northwestern Media; (University of Northwestern - St. Paul)
- Sister stations: KFNW, Faith Radio

History
- First air date: March 12, 1965
- Call sign meaning: Fargo, University of Northwestern - St. Paul

Technical information
- Licensing authority: FCC
- Facility ID: 49772
- Class: C
- ERP: 100,000 watts
- HAAT: 305 meters
- Transmitter coordinates: 47°0′35.9″N 97°11′42.3″W
- Translator: 93.9 K230AS (Fergus Falls, Minnesota)

Links
- Public license information: Public file; LMS
- Webcast: Listen Live
- Website: life979.com

KFNW-FM (97.9 MHz) is a Christian adult contemporary music formatted radio station located in Fargo, North Dakota. Branded Life 97.9, the station is owned and operated by Northwestern Media, a ministry of the University of Northwestern- St. Paul in St. Paul, Minnesota.

KFNW is a non-profit radio station, receiving its funding from listener donations. The station is also aired on several low-powered broadcast translators outside of its main listening area. The station's programming is also streamed on the internet.

Its studios are located on 53rd Avenue South in Fargo, while its transmitter is located near Amenia.

== History ==
On March 12, 1965, the station signed on the air.

On June 1, 2007, a fire in the antenna system used by KFNW-FM, WDAY-FM, and KRWK put all three stations off the air. KFNW-FM later resumed broadcasting from a backup transmitter site at reduced power.

In May 2020, KFNW-FM won the award for Small Market Station of the Year given by the Christian Music Broadcasters.

In May 2021, KFNW-FM moved their studios and offices to a remodeled facility located on 53rd Avenue South in Fargo.

== Translators ==
Broadcast translator for KFNW-FM
Call sign	Frequency	City of license	FID	ERP (W)	Class	FCC info
K230AS	(93.9 MHz) FM	Fergus Falls, Minnesota	141499	250	D	LMS
