= KSJI =

Simulcasts KJNW Kansas City
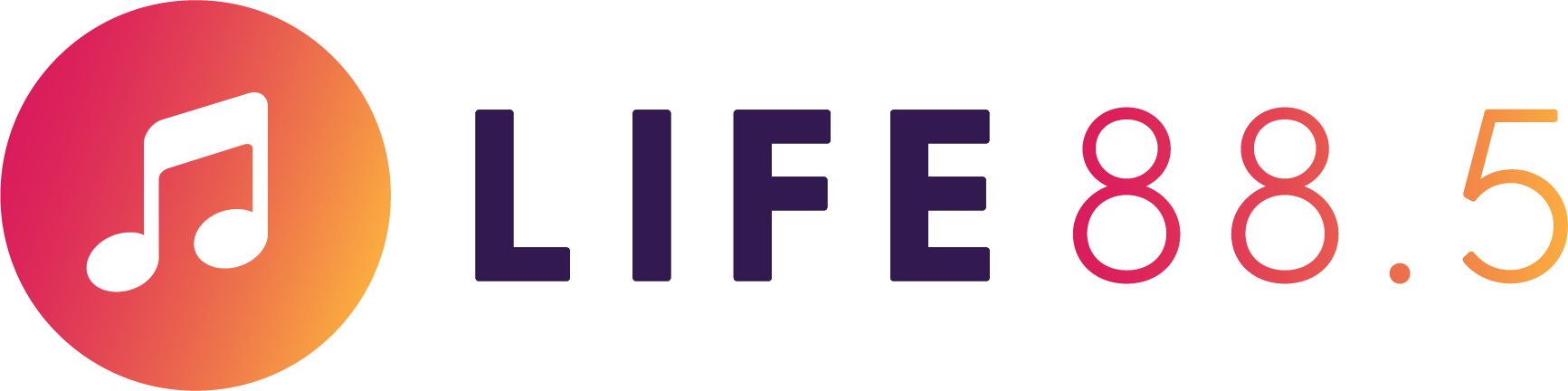
- St. Joseph, Missouri; United States
- Broadcast area: Northeastern KS, Northwest MO, Southeastern NE, Northern KC Metro
- Frequency: 91.1 MHz
- Branding: Life 88.5

Programming
- Format: Christian Adult Contemporary
- Affiliations: Northwestern Media

Ownership
- Owner: University of Northwestern – St. Paul

History
- First air date: 2010

Technical information
- Licensing authority: FCC
- Facility ID: 81962
- Class: C3
- ERP: 14,000 watts
- HAAT: 131 meters (430 ft)
- Transmitter coordinates: 39°44′03″N 94°47′24″W

Links
- Public license information: Public file; LMS
- Website: life885.com

KSJI (91.1 FM) is a radio station broadcasting a Christian Adult Contemporary format. Licensed to St. Joseph, Missouri, the station is owned and operated by the University of Northwestern - St. Paul, simulcasting KJNW "Life 88.5" from Kansas City. On July 1, 2024, the owned and operated affiliate Spirit FM left the St. Joseph market after 4 years prior to the acquisition of the independent religious radio station in July 2023.

Prior to being bought out by the then independent Spirit FM, KSJI was its own independent station, playing a CCM (Contemporary Christian Music) format known as "Joy 91.1/Joy 91.1 KSJI". The station was managed by Chris Meikel (who is now the Manager of Community Engagement for Bott Radio Network).
