= KLBF =

Faith Radio station in Lincoln–Bismarck, North Dakota

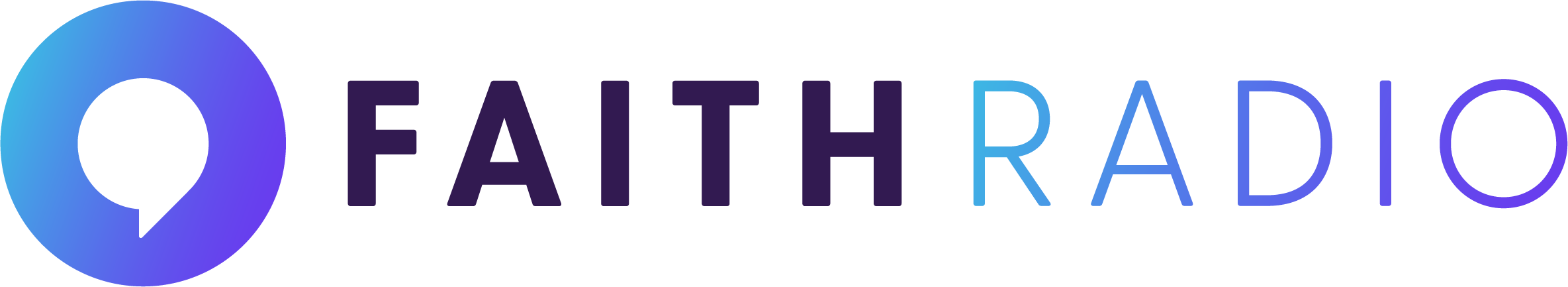

Lincoln, North Dakota; United States
- Broadcast area: Bismarck-Mandan
- Frequency: 89.1 MHz
- Branding: Faith Radio

Programming
- Format: Christian talk and teaching
- Network: Faith Radio

Ownership
- Owner: Northwestern Media; (University of Northwestern - St Paul)

History
- First air date: 2006
- Former call signs: KVLQ (2003–2008); KGCD (2008–2010)

Technical information
- Licensing authority: FCC
- Facility ID: 91457
- Class: C3
- ERP: 2,300 watts
- HAAT: 213 meters
- Transmitter coordinates: 46°35′24″N 100°47′47″W
- Translators: 88.3 K202EN (Fairmont, MN); (88.3 MHz) K202EO (Hibbing, MN); 89.5 K208EX (Brandon, SD); 89.9 K206DI (Mankato, MN); (91.9 MHz) K220BI (Grand Marais)

Links
- Public license information: Public file; LMS
- Webcast: Listen live
- Website: myfaithradio.com

KLBF (89.1 FM, "Faith Radio") is a radio station licensed to serve Lincoln, North Dakota, serving the Bismarck-Mandan area. The station is owned by the University of Northwestern - St Paul. It airs a Christian talk/music format.

== History ==
The station was assigned the KVLQ call letters by the Federal Communications Commission on March 28, 2003, and aired the K-Love network until 2008. From 2008 to November 2010 the station was branded as "God's Country Radio" airing a Christian country and Southern Gospel. After the Educational Media Foundation (EMF) stopped distributing God's Country, KGCD changed its call sign to KLBF and returned to carrying K-Love, even though KBMK (88.3 FM) also carried K-Love programming in Bismarck.

The University of Northwestern - St Paul agreed to acquire KLBF from EMF for $50,000 in April 2017, with the intent of using the station to carry its Faith Radio network. Following a silent period, KLBF began carrying Faith Radio by October 2017.
