= KTIS (AM) =

Christian radio station in Minneapolis, Minnesota

Faith Radio flagship station
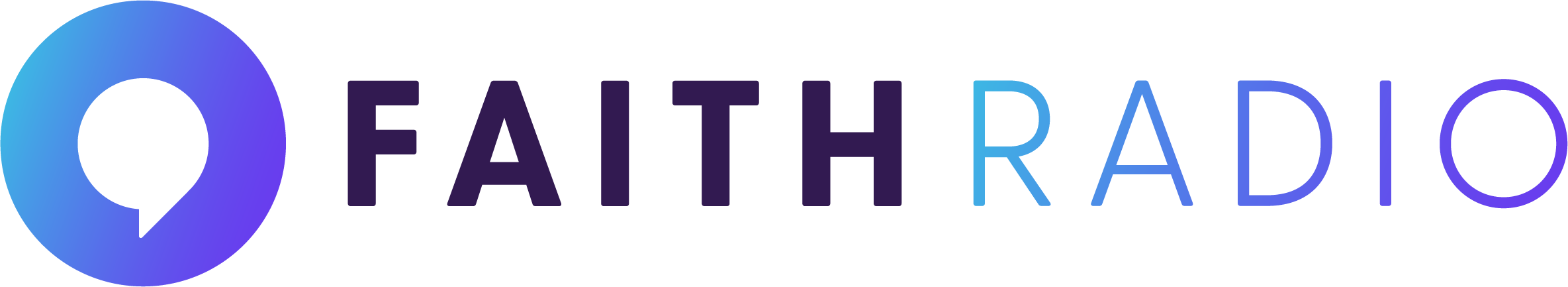
- Minneapolis, Minnesota; United States
- Broadcast area: Minneapolis-St. Paul
- Frequency: 900 kHz
- Branding: Faith Radio

Programming
- Format: Christian talk and teaching
- Affiliations: SRN News

Ownership
- Owner: Northwestern Media; (University of Northwestern - St Paul)
- Sister stations: KTIS-FM

History
- First air date: February 7, 1949; 77 years ago

Technical information
- Licensing authority: FCC
- Facility ID: 49770
- Class: B
- Power: 50,000 watts (day); 500 watts (night)
- Transmitter coordinates: 44°59′24″N 92°58′52″W
- Translator: See § Translators
- Repeater: See § Faith Radio stations

Links
- Public license information: Public file; LMS
- Webcast: Listen live
- Website: myfaithradio.com

KTIS (900 AM) is a radio station based in Minneapolis, Minnesota, owned and operated by University of Northwestern - St Paul. It is a non-profit, listener-supported radio station relying on donations from the local community throughout the year. KTIS's studios are located on Snelling Avenue in St. Paul, while its transmitter is located in the Hazel Park neighborhood of Oakdale. The station broadcasts throughout the midwest.

KTIS is the flagship station of Faith Radio, a network whose programming features mainly Christian talk and teaching, with programs such as Susie Larson Live with Susie Larson; Focus on the Family; Family Life Today with Dave and Anne Wilson; Insight for Living with Chuck Swindoll; Living on the Edge with Chip Ingram; In Touch with Dr. Charles Stanley; and others. Programming is nearly 100 percent satellite deliverable and produced by Northwestern Media.

== History ==
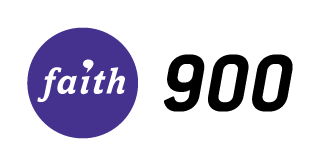
Former "Faith 900" logo

KTIS and KTIS-FM (98.5) were founded in 1949 by Rev. Billy Graham when he was president of the University of Northwestern - St Paul.

On February 6, 2015, KTIS began simulcasting on FM translator K214DF (90.7 FM), which is better received in the western (Minneapolis) suburbs, via the HD2 channel of sister station KTIS-FM. The station added a second translator on W248CU (97.5 FM), which is better received in the eastern (St. Paul) suburbs, in June 2017, though there is significant overlap with 90.7. The second translator, licensed to Minneapolis but transmitting from St. Paul, forced a low-powered FM KPPS-LP to apply for an emergency increase in power from 50 watts to 100 watts due to interference. KPPS-LP already had an application to move to 88.9 FM however, so the request to increase power was denied by the FCC. In addition, the translator on 97.5 FM is on the same frequency as KNXR licensed to Rochester, causing some complaints from listeners in the south metro who could no longer hear the station. This is not the first time KNXR has been interfered with via a licensed broadcast station.

== Faith Radio stations ==
Call sign	Frequency	City of license	State	Facility ID	Class	Power (W)	ERP (W)	Height (m (ft))
WNWW	1290 AM	West Hartford	Connecticut	25073	D	490 day 11 night	—	—
KNWS	1090 AM	Waterloo	Iowa	49784	D	1,000 day	—	—
KDNI	90.5 FM	Duluth	Minnesota	49768	C3	—	2,000	222 m (728 ft)
KTIS-HD2	98.5-2 FM (HD)	Minneapolis	Minnesota	49787	C0	—	100,000	315 m (1,033 ft)
KJNW-HD2	88.5-2 FM (HD)	Kansas City	Missouri	8401	C1	—	100,000	227 m (745 ft)
KNWI-HD2	107.1-2 FM (HD)	Osceola	Iowa	37454	C1	—	100,000	299 m (981 ft)
KLBF	89.1 FM	Lincoln	North Dakota	91457	C3	—	2,300	213 m (699 ft)
KFNW	1200 AM	West Fargo	North Dakota	49792	B	50,000 day 13,000 night	—	—
KNWC	1270 AM	Sioux Falls	South Dakota	49774	B	5,000 day 2,300 night	—	—
WNWC	1190 AM	Sun Prairie	Wisconsin	17381	D	4,800 day 21 night	—	—
KLMP	88.3 FM	Rapid City	South Dakota	88452	C	—	63,000	522 m (1,713 ft)
KLMP-FM1	88.3 FM	Rapid City	South Dakota	161655	D	—	2,300	0 m (0 ft)

=== Translators ===
Broadcast translators for KTIS
Call sign	Frequency	City of license	FID	ERP (W)	Class	FCC info
K214DF	(90.7 (Note: Owned by the Educational Media Foundation and relays KTIS via KTIS-FM's HD2 subchannel.)) FM	Golden Valley, Minnesota	90816	99	D	LMS
K215DU	(90.9 (Note: Relays KTIS via KTIS-FM's HD2 subchannel.)) FM	Hutchinson, Minnesota	106579	230	D	LMS
W248CU	97.5 FM	Minneapolis, Minnesota	138656	250	D	LMS
K277CC	103.3 FM	Pennock, Minnesota	141147	170	D	LMS
