= KCVY =

- Cabool, Missouri; United States
- Frequency: 89.9 MHz
- Branding: Spirit FM

Programming
- Format: Christian Adult Contemporary
- Affiliations: Spirit FM

Ownership
- Owner: University of Northwestern – St. Paul

History
- Former call signs: KVBD (2000–2001); KFFW (2001–2008)

Technical information
- Licensing authority: FCC
- Facility ID: 90453
- Class: C3
- ERP: 10,500 watts
- HAAT: 151.0 meters (495.4 ft)
- Transmitter coordinates: 37°5′32.00″N 92°3′10.00″W

Links
- Public license information: Public file; LMS
- Webcast: Listen Live
- Website: spiritfm.org

KCVY (89.9 FM) is a radio station licensed to Cabool, Missouri, United States. The station is an affiliate of Spirit FM, broadcasting a Christian Adult Contemporary format with a few Christian talk and teaching programs, and is currently owned by the University of Northwestern – St. Paul.

== History ==
The station was assigned the call sign KVBD on October 17, 2000. On May 17, 2001, the station changed its call sign to KFFW, on August 7, 2008 to the current KCVY, and on August 3, 2006, the station was sold to Lake Area Educational Broadcasting Foundation.

Effective July 5, 2023, Lake Area Educational Broadcasting Foundation sold KCVY, fourteen sister stations, eight translators, and six construction permits to the University of Northwestern – St. Paul for $1.25 million.
