= WNWC (AM) =

Faith Radio station in Sun Prairie–Madison, Wisconsin

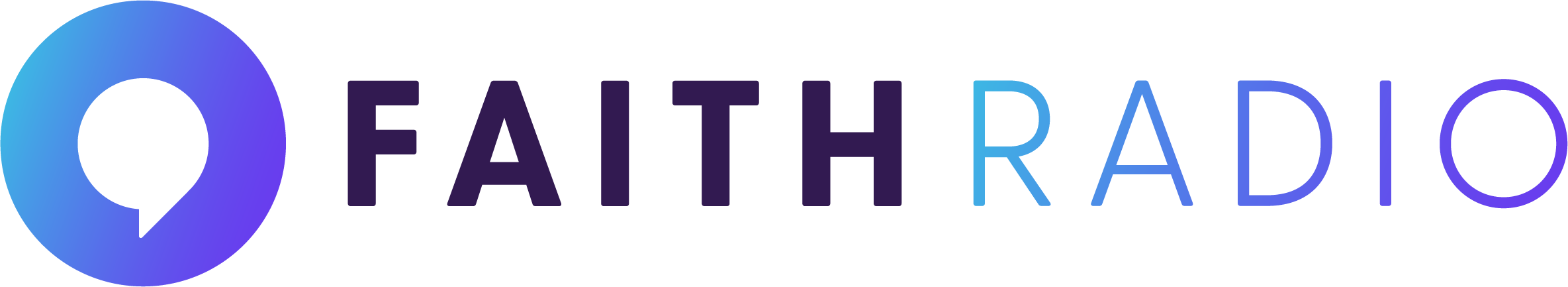

Sun Prairie, Wisconsin; United States
- Broadcast area: Madison, Wisconsin
- Frequency: 1190 kHz
- Branding: Faith Radio

Programming
- Format: Christian talk and teaching
- Affiliations: Northwestern Media's Faith Radio Network

Ownership
- Owner: Northwestern Media; (University of Northwestern - St Paul)
- Sister stations: WNWC-FM

History
- Former call signs: WERU (1981–1995); WMAD (1985–1997)

Technical information
- Licensing authority: FCC
- Facility ID: 17381
- Class: D
- Power: 4,800 watts day 21 watts night
- Transmitter coordinates: 43°9′36.00″N 89°12′55.00″W
- Translator: 104.7 W284CW (Madison)
- Repeater: 102.5 WNWC-HD2 (Madison)

Links
- Public license information: Public file; LMS
- Website: myfaithradio.com

WNWC (1190 kHz "Faith 1190 WNWC" or "Faith Radio") is an AM radio station in Sun Prairie, Wisconsin, owned and operated by University of Northwestern – St. Paul. It is a non-profit, listener-supported radio station relying on donations from the local community throughout the year. It also broadcasts on an FM translator at 104.7 FM, covering Madison, Wisconsin and surrounding areas from a transmitter located south of Sun Prairie.

== History ==
=== Early success and financial trouble ===
Erin Broadcasting Corporation, owned by Nancy and John McMahon, put the 1190 frequency on the air in Madison as WERU on January 13, 1982. WERU, a daytime-only station, initially aired an adult standards format using the Music of Your Life syndicated format. Before signing on, the station scored a major coup when it lured market "morning institution" Jim Mader from WIBA (1310 AM). The company also purchased WMAD (92.1 FM) before WERU signed on. The station made an immediate impression in the Madison radio ratings, ranking third in the market in its first book.

However, the 8.3 posted in its first year would be the high water mark for the frequency, as ratings fell every year in the 1980s after the station's debut. Mader left in 1984 for WNLT (94.9 FM), a move that prompted a breach of contract lawsuit. Erin sold WERU and WMAD to Jay and Loretta Blackburn in 1985 for $2.4 million. As part of an engineering overhaul, WERU kept its format but became WMAD, matching the FM. Ratings continued to slide despite the changes. The Blackburns, however, had more pressing issues of a financial nature, including debts owed to the Internal Revenue Service. After they could not meet their obligations to the original owners, the McMahons bought back WMAD-AM-FM for one dollar in November 1986.

=== All-news and bank intervention ===
In February 1989, WMAD went briefly off air to install new equipment. When it returned, it had shed its three live air staff and instituted a broader oldies format. Continued low ratings prompted the station to change again that September to the audio of CNN Headline News, with an assortment of weekend specialty shows including an afternoon big band show.

After several years, WMAD ran into financial trouble again. In 1991, McMahon surrendered the assets of WMAD-AM-FM to the Bank of Sun Prairie. Under the bank's ownership, in January 1992, WMAD returned to its adult standards format under the name "Memories 1190". Five months later, however, on June 2, 1992, the bank opted to cease operating the stations. The move came as a shock to the employees of the two stations, particularly as three new staff had started at WMAD-AM-FM in the ten days preceding the closure, one of them the preceding day. One staffer, who called the move by the Bank of Sun Prairie "premeditated murder", claimed that a board member of the institution had compared the pair to a "stock that wasn't performing to our expectations" that they had sold. In a statement, the bank said it had only been operating the outlets while it tried to find a buyer.

After the bank took the two stations silent, they were sold twice, first to Allen Shaw in October 1992 and then to Lee Leicinger, part-owner of WIBA-AM-FM; the FM station returned in June 1993, and a month later, WMAD AM and its standards programming were reactivated.

=== Point Communications sale and cluster spin-off ===
The WIBA and WMAD stations were sold in 1995 to Point Communications, an investment firm from New York; Leicinger continued as manager. A year later, Point announced its plans to merge with the three stations of Mid-Continent Broadcasting of Wisconsin. The combined firm could own six stations in Madison, and the two groups had seven. WMAD AM was immediately designated to be divested, as the weakest outlet in the combined cluster. Northwestern College, which had maintained a presence on the FM band in Madison since 1973 with WNWC-FM, submitted an offer to buy the AM frequency.

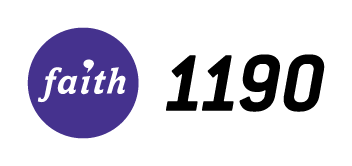
Former logo

Northwestern's $85,000 purchase of WMAD closed on January 2, 1997. The college took over and renamed the station WNWC, initially simulcasting the FM but with plans to institute the Christian talk format heard today. In 2007, Northwestern filed for and was approved to add nighttime operation to WNWC, using 21 watts.

== Programming ==
WNWC, like Northwestern's other AM stations, airs its Faith Radio Christian talk and teaching format, which is delivered from Northwestern Media's studio base in Minneapolis. Programs on Faith Radio include Turning Point with David Jeremiah; Focus on the Family; Family Life Today with Dennis Rainey; Insight for Living with Chuck Swindoll; Living on the Edge with Chip Ingram; In Touch with Charles Stanley; and others.

== Translators ==
In 2016, this station started broadcasting on W284CW 104.7 FM.

Broadcast translator for WNWC AM
Call sign	Frequency	City of license	FID	ERP (W)	Class	FCC info
W284CW	104.7 FM	Madison, Wisconsin	138668	250	D	LMS
