= KJNW =

Radio station in Kansas City

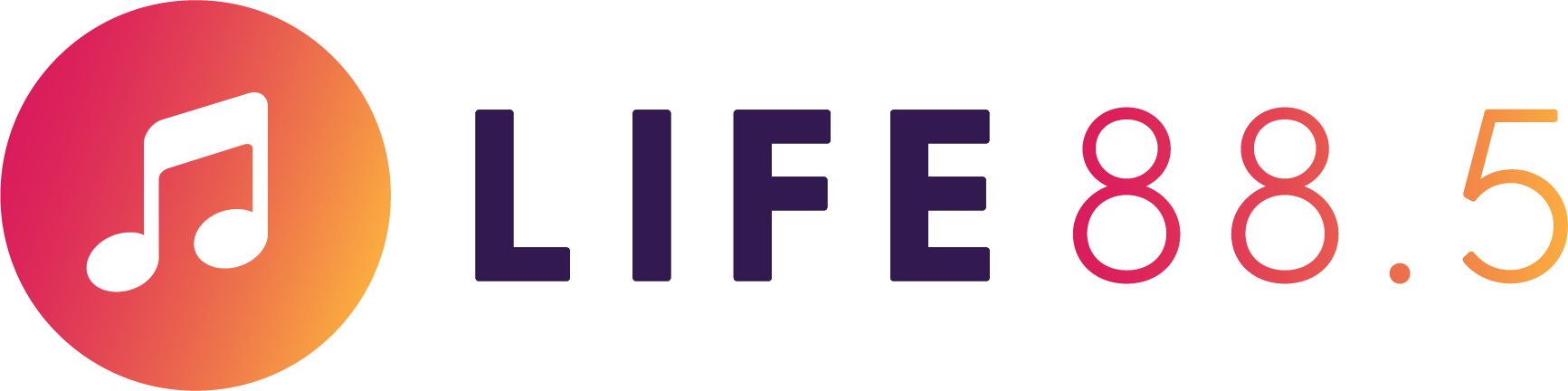
- Kansas City, Missouri; United States
- Broadcast area: Kansas City metropolitan area
- Frequency: 88.5 MHz (HD Radio)
- Branding: Life 88.5

Programming
- Format: Christian adult contemporary
- Subchannels: HD2: Faith Radio (Christian Talk and Music)
- Affiliations: Northwestern Media

Ownership
- Owner: University of Northwestern – St. Paul

History
- First air date: August 9, 1970 (as KLJC)
- Former call signs: KLJC (1970–2013)

Technical information
- Licensing authority: FCC
- Facility ID: 8401
- Class: C1
- ERP: 100,000 watts
- HAAT: 227 meters (745 ft)
- Transmitter coordinates: 39°04′24″N 94°29′06″W
- Repeaters: 91.1 KSJI (St. Joseph)

Links
- Public license information: Public file; LMS
- Website: life885.com

KJNW (88.5 FM, "Life 88.5") is a listener-supported, non-commercial radio station licensed to Kansas City, Missouri. The station is owned by Northwestern Media, a ministry of University of Northwestern – St. Paul, and airs a Christian adult contemporary radio format. KJNW's studios and offices located on Indian Creek Parkway, Overland Park, Kansas City, while its transmitter is located on Wallace Avenue in Kansas City, near Interstate 435. It broadcasts an HD Radio signal, and features a Christian talk and music format on its HD2 subchannel.

== History ==
The station signed on the air on August 9, 1970. Its call sign was KLJC and was owned by the Calvary Bible College. The station aired a Christian radio format, including music and teaching programs. At first, the station ran at only at 510 watts, a fraction of its current power.

By 1980, the power was boosted to 6,000 watts, allowing it to cover Kansas City and its adjacent suburbs. It added news from the ABC Information Network. In the early 2000s, the power was raised to the maximum 100,000 watts, using Kansas City's tallest FM and TV antenna on Wallace Avenue, giving KLJC coverage over much of Western Missouri and Eastern Kansas.

After running the station for 33 years, the college sold the station University of Northwestern - St. Paul in January 2013 for $6 million. On June 16, 2013, the call letters were changed to KJNW, to reflect the station's new owner.

In 2014, KJNW was a top 3 finalist for CMB Large Market Station of the Year. That same year, "Life 88.5" also finished as runner-Up for the National Religious Broadcasters (NRB) Station of the Year.

In 2021, KJNW was named the CMB Large Market Station of the Year.
