= KFNW (AM) =

Faith Radio station in West Fargo, North Dakota

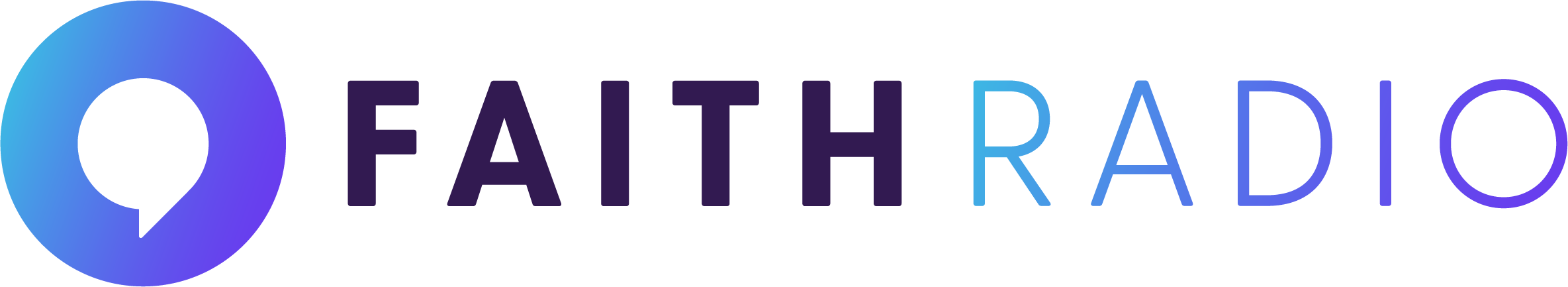
- West Fargo, North Dakota; United States
- Broadcast area: Fargo-Moorhead
- Frequency: 1200 kHz
- Branding: Faith 1200, Faith Radio

Programming
- Format: Christian talk and teaching
- Affiliations: Northwestern Media's Faith Network

Ownership
- Owner: Northwestern Media; (University of Northwestern - St. Paul)
- Sister stations: KFNW-FM

History
- First air date: October 25, 1955
- Former call signs: KVNW (1955, CP)
- Call sign meaning: "Fargo Northwestern College"

Technical information
- Licensing authority: FCC
- Facility ID: 49792
- Class: B
- Power: 50,000 watts day 13,000 watts night
- Transmitter coordinates: 46°48′06″N 96°52′59″W
- Translator: 102.5 K273DJ (West Fargo)

Links
- Public license information: Public file; LMS
- Website: myfaithradio.com

KFNW, known on-air as Faith 1200 KFNW, or by the network name Faith Radio, is a radio station in Fargo, North Dakota (licensed to serve adjacent West Fargo), owned and operated by University of Northwestern - St. Paul and is a non-profit, listener-supported radio station relying on donations from the local community throughout the year. It broadcasts on 1200 AM, covering Fargo-Moorhead and surrounding areas in North Dakota.

KFNW AM moved from their studios, offices and transmitter array on 52nd Avenue South in Fargo to new sites. They moved to their new studios and offices in May 2021 on 53rd Ave South in Fargo to a building that was purchased and remodeled. The transmitter array moved to a new site in Aug 2021 that was purchased and prepared near the towns of Davenport, ND and Kindred, ND.

Programming is nearly 100 percent satellite delivered and produced by Northwestern Media.

The format is mainly Christian talk and teaching, with programs such as Turning Point with David Jeremiah; Focus on the Family; Family Life Today with Dennis Rainey; Insight for Living with Chuck Swindoll; Living on the Edge with Chip Ingram; In Touch with Charles Stanley; and others.

== History ==
Former logo

KFNW was built by Northwestern and came to air October 25, 1955. It broadcast on 900 kHz with daytime-only operation. In 1974, it was allowed to move to 1170 kHz and broadcast full-time; the next year, it applied for its first power increase, to 10,000 watts. In 1982, it was approved to relocate again, to 1200 kHz.

== Translators ==
Broadcast translator for KFNW-AM
Call sign	Frequency	City of license	FID	ERP (W)	Class	FCC info
K273DJ	102.5 FM	West Fargo, North Dakota	202255	250	D	LMS
