= KNWS (AM) =

Faith Radio station in Waterloo, Iowa

Coordinates: 42°26′38″N 92°17′57″W

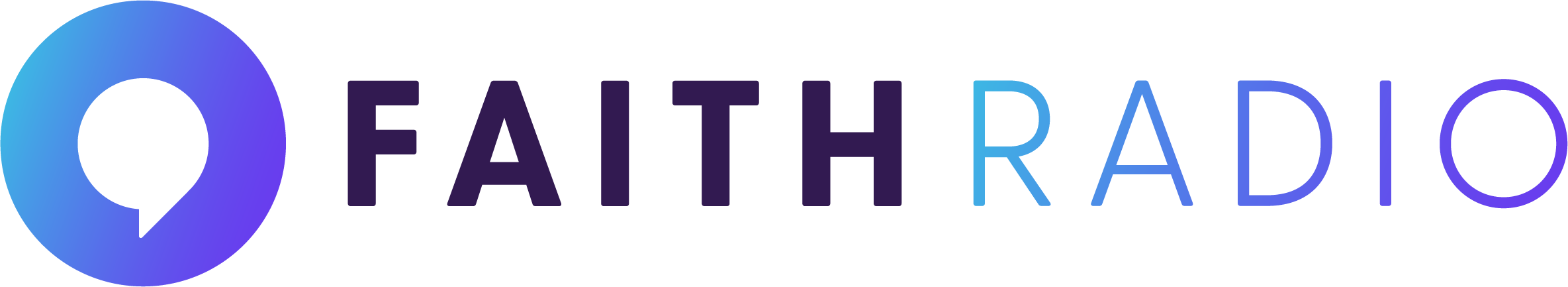
- Waterloo, Iowa; United States
- Broadcast area: Eastern Iowa
- Frequency: 1090 kHz

Programming
- Format: Christian radio
- Network: Faith Radio

Ownership
- Owner: Northwestern Media; (University of Northwestern – St. Paul)
- Sister stations: KNWS-FM

History
- First air date: May 1947
- Former call signs: KAYX (1947–1950); KBOK (1950–1953)
- Call sign meaning: University of Northwestern

Technical information
- Licensing authority: FCC
- Facility ID: 49784
- Class: D
- Power: 1,000 watts day 57 watts night
- Translator: 93.1 K226CK (Waterloo)

Links
- Public license information: Public file; LMS
- Website: myfaithradio.com

KNWS (1090 kHz) is a non-commercial AM radio station licensed to Waterloo, Iowa, United States, and serving much of eastern Iowa. It is owned and operated by the University of Northwestern – St. Paul and carries the Christian-formatted Faith Radio network. KNWS is also heard around the clock over low-power FM translator K226CK at 93.1 MHz.

== History ==
The station signed on the air in May 1947 as KAYX, owned by the Waterloo Broadcasting Company.

The station became KBOK on April 27, 1950, with the new call letters making their on-air debut on May 8. At that time, Waterloo Broadcasting sought to move the station to 1280 kHz, using a new tower site, but eventually requested that the construction permit be canceled.

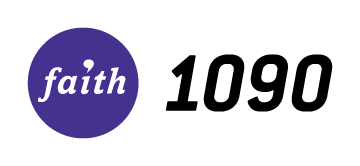
Former logo

In January 1953, it was announced that the Northwestern Schools would acquire KBOK, converting it to a noncommercial Christian format. The studios would be moved from downtown to the transmitter site. On April 1, 1953, Northwestern began operating the new KNWS, KNWS would be Northwestern Schools first expansion outside of Minneapolis-St. Paul.

== Translators ==
Broadcast translator for KNWS-AM
Call sign	Frequency	City of license	FID	ERP (W)	Class	FCC info
K226CK	93.1 FM	Waterloo, Iowa	150570	250	D	LMS
