= KNWC (AM) =

Faith Radio station in Sioux Falls, South Dakota

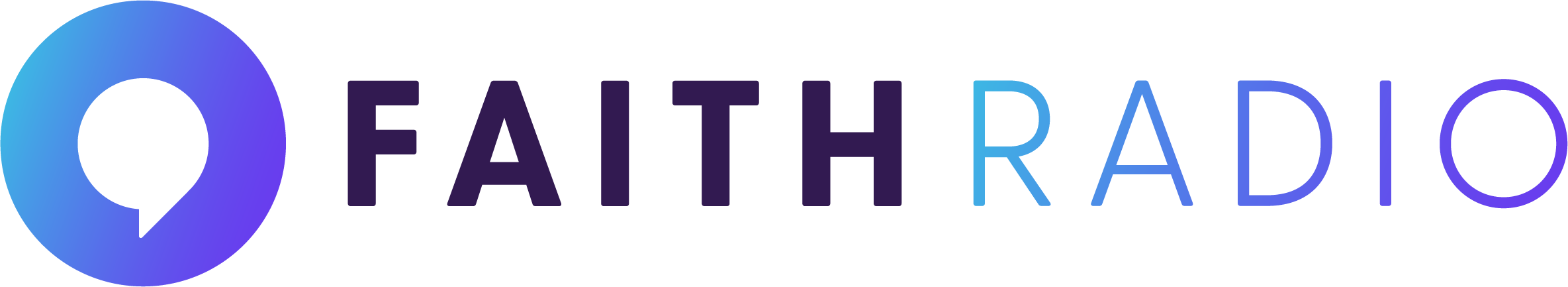
- Sioux Falls, South Dakota; United States
- Broadcast area: Sioux Empire
- Frequency: 1270 KHz
- Branding: Faith Radio

Programming
- Format: Christian talk and teaching
- Network: Faith Radio
- Affiliations: Northwestern Media

Ownership
- Owner: Northwestern Media; (University of Northwestern – St Paul)
- Sister stations: KNWC-FM

History
- First air date: 1948
- Former call signs: KIHO (1948–1961)
- Call sign meaning: Northwestern College

Technical information
- Licensing authority: FCC
- Facility ID: 49774
- Class: B
- Power: 5,000 watts day 2,300 watts night
- Transmitter coordinates: 43°17′6.9″N 96°45′54.2″W
- Translator: 107.5 K298CY (Sioux Falls)

Links
- Public license information: Public file; LMS
- Webcast: Available on website
- Website: www.myfaithradio.com

KNWC, known on-air as Faith 1270 KNWC, or by the network name Faith Radio, is a radio station in Sioux Falls, South Dakota, owned and operated by University of Northwestern – St Paul and is a non-profit, listener-supported radio station relying on donations from the local community throughout the year. It broadcasts on 1270 AM, covering the Sioux Empire and surrounding areas in South Dakota.

== Programming ==
Former logo

Programming is nearly 100 percent satellite delivered and produced by Northwestern Media. The format is mainly Christian talk and teaching, with programs such as Turning Point with David Jeremiah; Focus on the Family; Family Life Today with Dennis Rainey; Insight for Living with Chuck Swindoll; Living on the Edge with Chip Ingram; In Touch with Dr. Charles Stanley; and others.

== Translators ==
Broadcast translator for KNWC
Call sign	Frequency	City of license	FID	ERP (W)	Class	FCC info
K298CY	107.5 FM	Sioux Falls, South Dakota	202254	250	D	LMS
