= KCKP =

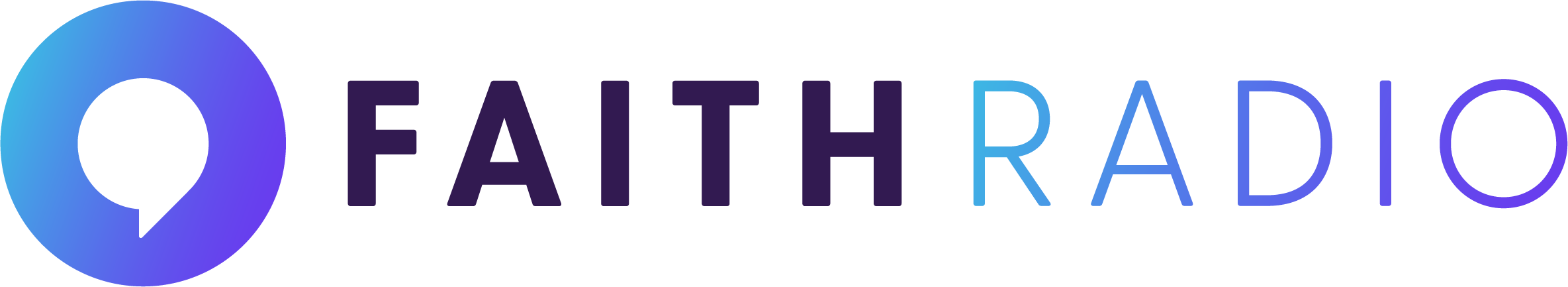
- Laurie, Missouri; United States
- Frequency: 100.9 MHz
- Branding: FAITH 100.9 FM

Programming
- Format: Christian talk and teaching

Ownership
- Owner: University of Northwestern – St. Paul

Technical information
- Licensing authority: FCC
- Facility ID: 184972
- Class: C3
- ERP: 23,500 watts
- HAAT: 103 meters (338 ft)
- Transmitter coordinates: 38°06′32″N 92°44′11″W
- Translators: 89.3 K207AY (St. Robert); 90.1 K211FV (Sedalia); 104.9 K285FC (Jefferson City)

Links
- Public license information: Public file; LMS
- Webcast: Listen Live
- Website: Official Website

KCKP (100.9 FM) is a radio station licensed to serve the community of Laurie, Missouri. The station is owned by the University of Northwestern – St. Paul. It airs a Christian talk and teaching format.

The Federal Communications Commission (FCC) assigned the call sign KCKP to the station on August 19, 2011. It was established as a non-commercial educational facility to serve the Lake of the Ozarks region. The station was originally licensed to the Lake Area Educational Broadcasting Foundation. In early 2023, the foundation entered an agreement to transfer the license of KCKP and its associated translators.

KCKP is currently owned and operated by the University of Northwestern - St. Paul. This ownership transition placed the station within the university’s "Faith Radio" network, which manages dozens of stations across the Midwest.

The station broadcasts a Christian Talk and Teaching format, identified on-air as "Faith 100.9 FM". The schedule features syndicated Bible teaching from speakers such as Dr. David Jeremiah, Alistair Begg, and Chuck Swindoll. KCKP serves as a primary hub for regional translators, extending its signal to Jefferson City on 104.9 FM (K285FC), Sedalia on 90.1 FM (K211FV), and St. Robert on 89.3 FM (K207AY).
