= KVSR =

- Kirksville, Missouri; United States
- Frequency: 90.7 MHz
- Branding: Spirit FM

Programming
- Format: Christian Adult Contemporary
- Affiliations: Spirit FM

Ownership
- Owner: University of Northwestern – St. Paul

History
- First air date: 1998
- Former call signs: KHGN (1996–2010)

Technical information
- Licensing authority: FCC
- Facility ID: 78923
- Class: C1
- ERP: 50,000 watts
- HAAT: 143 meters (469 ft)
- Transmitter coordinates: 40°13′46″N 92°32′36″W

Links
- Public license information: Public file; LMS
- Webcast: Listen Live
- Website: spiritfm.org

KVSR (90.7 FM) is a Christian radio station licensed to Kirksville, Missouri, United States. The station is an affiliate of Spirit FM, broadcasting a Christian Adult Contemporary format with a few Christian talk and teaching programs, and is currently owned by the University of Northwestern – St. Paul.

== History ==
The station was previously owned by Care Broadcasting, and held the callsign KHGN from the time it came on the air in 1998 until July 2010. The station was initially known as "The Heartland's Good News Station", and primarily aired Christian talk and teaching programming as an affiliate of Moody Broadcasting Network. KHGN became an affiliate of Spirit FM in March 2007, and was sold to Lake Area Educational Broadcasting Foundation on April 22, 2010. On July 27, 2010, the station's call sign was changed to KVSR.

Effective July 5, 2023, Lake Area Educational Broadcasting Foundation sold KVSR, fourteen sister stations, eight translators, and six construction permits to the University of Northwestern – St. Paul for $1.25 million.
