= KTIS-FM =

Christian radio station in Minneapolis, Minnesota

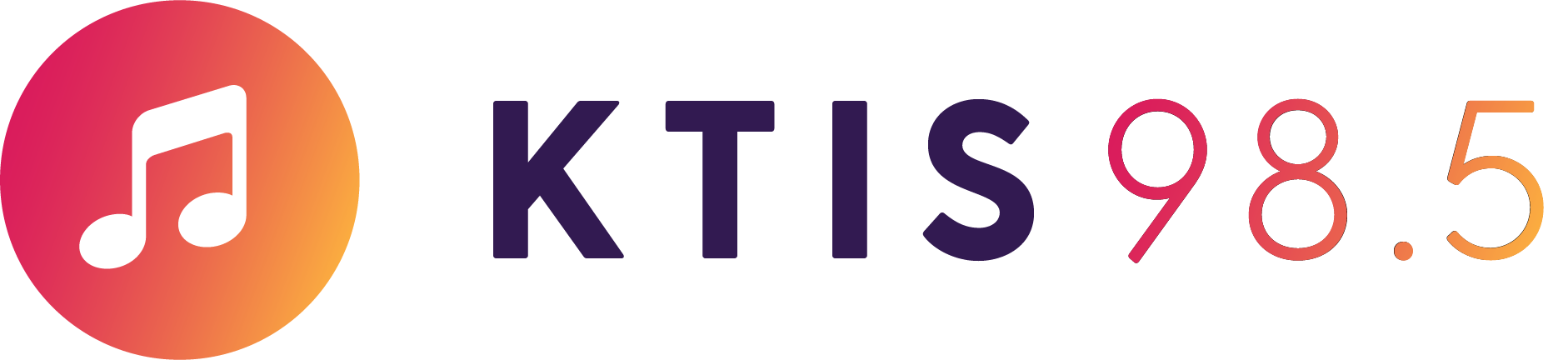
- Minneapolis, Minnesota; United States
- Broadcast area: Minneapolis-St. Paul
- Frequency: 98.5 MHz (HD Radio)
- Branding: 98.5 KTIS

Programming
- Format: Christian adult contemporary
- Subchannels: HD2: Christian (KTIS); HD3: Contemporary worship music

Ownership
- Owner: Northwestern Media; (University of Northwestern – St. Paul)
- Sister stations: KTIS

Technical information
- Licensing authority: FCC
- Facility ID: 49787
- Class: C0
- ERP: 100,000 watts
- HAAT: 315 meters (1,033 ft)
- Transmitter coordinates: 45°3′29.9″N 93°7′27.8″W
- Translator: See § Translators

Links
- Public license information: Public file; LMS
- Webcast: Listen live
- Website: myktis.com

KTIS-FM (98.5 FM) is a Christian adult contemporary music formatted radio station located in Minneapolis, Minnesota owned and operated by Northwestern Media, a ministry of the University of Northwestern - St. Paul. The station's studios are located on Snelling Avenue in Roseville (which is next to St. Paul), while its transmitter is located on the KMSP Tower in Shoreview.

KTIS is a non-profit radio station, receiving most of its donations and contributions from its listeners. The station is also aired on low-powered translators outside its main listening area. The station's programming is also streamed on the Internet.

KTIS hosts many different service projects and activities with which to better the community, such as the "Drive-thru Difference" and the web application PrayerWorks, which lets users submit prayer requests to be viewed by other users. The other users can then send a notification to the person who first submitted the request, letting them know that their prayer has been prayed.

== KTIS-FM-HD3 ==
KTIS-FM-HD3 is "The Mel", a student-operated station from University of Northwestern's Broadcasting Department. The station features eclectic music and clips from popular preachers and podcasts, as well as other features from the students of Northwestern.

== Translators ==
Broadcast translators for KTIS-FM
Call sign	Frequency	City of license	FID	ERP (W)	Class	FCC info
K299AL	107.7 FM	Albert Lea, Minnesota	22545	250	D	LMS
K215DU	90.9 FM	Hutchinson, Minnesota	106579	230	D	LMS
K235BH	94.9 FM	Mankato, Minnesota	74439	250	D	LMS
K270DZ	101.9 FM	New Ulm, Minnesota	141257	250	D	LMS
K232EK	94.3 FM	Rochester, Minnesota	139123	115	D	LMS
K224DB	(92.7 (HD)) FM	Willmar, Minnesota	139124	170	D	LMS
