= KNWC-FM =

Christian radio station in Sioux Falls, South Dakota

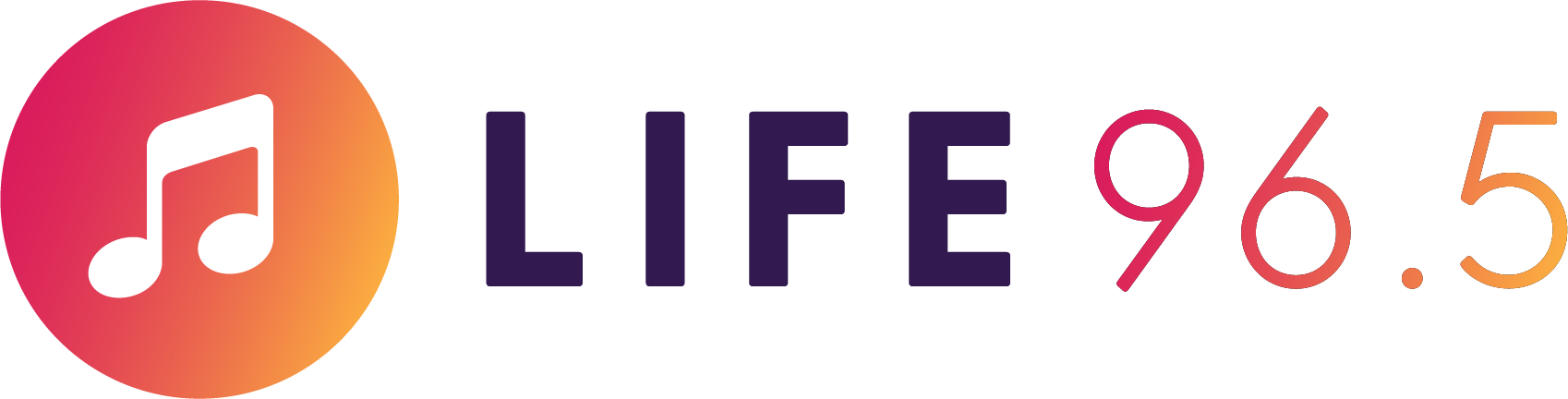
- Sioux Falls, South Dakota; United States
- Frequency: 96.5 MHz
- Branding: Life 96.5

Programming
- Format: Christian adult contemporary

Ownership
- Owner: Northwestern Media; (University of Northwestern – St. Paul)
- Sister stations: KNWC

History
- First air date: March 28, 1969
- Call sign meaning: Northwestern College

Technical information
- Licensing authority: FCC
- Facility ID: 49776
- Class: C
- ERP: 100,000 watts
- HAAT: 488 meters (1,601 ft)
- Transmitter coordinates: 43°31′6.9″N 96°32′6.2″W

Links
- Public license information: Public file; LMS
- Webcast: Listen live
- Website: www.life965.com

KNWC-FM (96.5 MHz), also known as Life 96.5, is an American Christian radio station located in Sioux Falls, South Dakota owned and operated by University of Northwestern – St. Paul, a Christian college in St. Paul, Minnesota. KNWC-FM concentrates on Christian adult contemporary music.

Its studios are located on South Tallgrass Avenue in Sioux Falls, while its transmitter is located near Rowena.

Life 96.5 is the official radio station of LifeLight Festival.

== 2007 FM transmitter failure ==
On Wednesday, January 24, 2007, KNWC-FM's main transmitter, which had been in service since 1983, failed. New parts were ordered so that the transmitter could serve as a backup in the future, as there was no backup main transmitter. This forced the purchase of a new transmitter. On Thursday, February 8, 2007, Life 96.5 was back up to full power, operating on the original transmitter; the new, permanent transmitter would be installed at a later date.

On Tuesday, March 6, 2007, the transmitter was again down. The new transmitter was installed on Thursday, March 8, 2007, but ice on the tower from a blizzard fell on the antenna, which resulted in more damage. That forced KNWC-FM to operate at low power on a backup antenna until the problem could be corrected. In late March 2007, KNWC-FM was operating at higher, but still reduced, power. KNWC-FM announced that the new antenna would be installed in May 2007, and Life 96.5 would operate on reduced power until then. After a long summer at reduced power due to circumstances beyond control, station manager Jeff Rupp announced KNWC-FM was back to full power on Friday, August 31, 2007.

== 2013 antenna failure ==
In May 2013, an ice storm took out KNWC-FM's antenna, forcing the station to briefly broadcast with lower power.

== Refuge Radio acquisition ==
The disbanding of Refuge Radio upon its donation to UNWSP in 2019 resulted in a substantial increase to KNWC-FM's network of translators, including a full-power repeater, KRGM in Marshall, Minnesota.

== Translators ==
Call sign	Frequency	City of license	FID	ERP (W)	HAAT	Class	FCC info
KRGM	89.9 FM	Marshall, Minnesota	173790	4,250	163 m (535 ft)	C3	LMS

Broadcast translator for KNWC-FM
Call sign	Frequency	City of license	FID	ERP (W)	Class	FCC info
K210CG	89.9 FM	Spirit Lake, Iowa	90145	250	D	LMS
K220HY	91.9 FM	Spencer, Iowa	94038	250	D	LMS
K220IT	91.9 FM	Watertown, South Dakota	138402	79	D	LMS
K229BK	93.7 FM	North Sioux City, South Dakota	139165	120	D	LMS
K231AR	94.1 FM	Mitchell, South Dakota	139171	250	D	LMS
K257CH	(99.3 (Note: Owned by Lakes Area Christian Radio. Received WJRF from K210CG, which now rebroadcasts KNWC-FM. In February 2020, Lakes Area filed to donate the translator to Northwestern Media.)) FM	Estherville, Iowa	83434	80	D	LMS
K288EV	105.5 FM	Brookings, South Dakota	72915	250	D	LMS
K288GA	105.5 FM	Sioux Falls, South Dakota	138081	220	D	LMS
