= Pennock, Minnesota =

City in Minnesota, United States

Pennock
- City
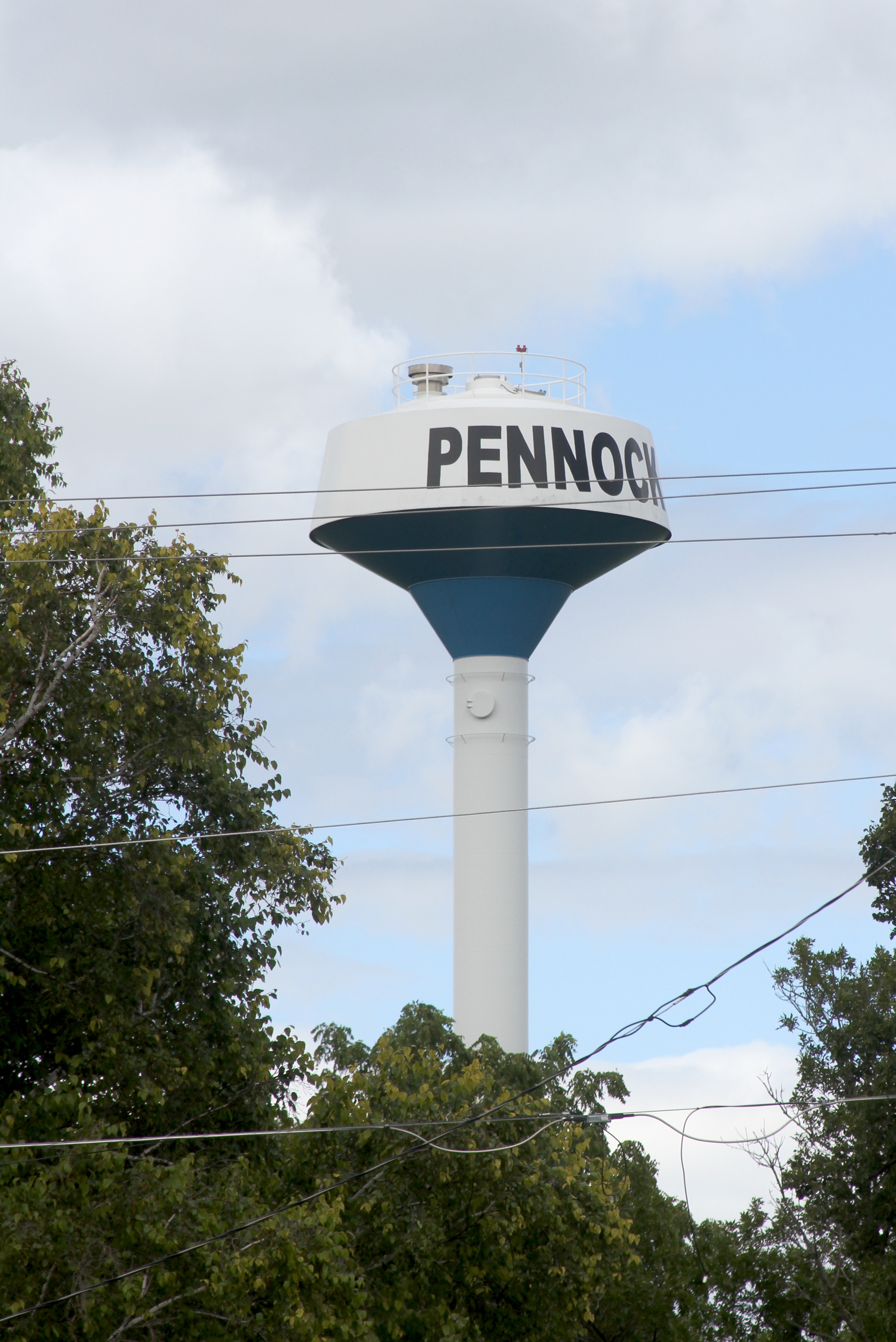
- Water tower

- Location of Pennock, Minnesota
- Coordinates: 45°08′45″N 95°10′30″W
- Country: United States
- State: Minnesota
- County: Kandiyohi

Area
  - Total: 1.02 sq mi (2.64 km^{2})
  - Land: 1.02 sq mi (2.64 km^{2})
  - Water: 0 sq mi (0.00 km^{2})
- Elevation: 1,122 ft (342 m)

Population (2020)
  - Total: 479
  - Density: 469/sq mi (181.1/km^{2})
- Time zone: UTC-6 (Central (CST))
  - Summer (DST): UTC-5 (CDT)
- ZIP code: 56279
- Area code: 320
- FIPS code: 27-50344
- GNIS feature ID: 2396177
- Website: https://www.cityofpennock.com/

Pennock is a city in Kandiyohi County, Minnesota, United States. The population was 479 at the 2020 census.

== History ==
Pennock was originally called Saint Johns, and under the latter name was laid out in 1871 when the railroad was extended to that point. A post office was established as Saint Johns in 1871, and the name was changed to Pennock in 1891. The present name is for George Pennock, a railroad official.

== Geography ==
According to the United States Census Bureau, the city has a total area of 1.06 square miles (2.75 km^{2}), all land.

U.S. Route 12 serves as a main route in the community.

== Demographics ==
Historical population
Census	Pop.	Note	%±
1910	189		—
1920	251		32.8%
1930	191		−23.9%
1940	219		14.7%
1950	238		8.7%
1960	257		8.0%
1970	255		−0.8%
1980	410		60.8%
1990	476		16.1%
2000	504		5.9%
2010	508		0.8%
2020	479		−5.7%
U.S. Decennial Census

=== 2010 census ===
As of the census of 2010, there were 508 people, 174 households, and 138 families living in the city. The population density was 479.2 inhabitants per square mile (185.0/km^{2}). There were 184 housing units at an average density of 173.6 per square mile (67.0/km^{2}). The racial makeup of the city was 91.5% White, 1.4% Asian, 3.9% from other races, and 3.1% from two or more races. Hispanic or Latino of any race were 16.9% of the population.

There were 174 households, of which 42.5% had children under the age of 18 living with them, 60.3% were married couples living together, 13.8% had a female householder with no husband present, 5.2% had a male householder with no wife present, and 20.7% were non-families. 14.9% of all households were made up of individuals, and 6.3% had someone living alone who was 65 years of age or older. The average household size was 2.92 and the average family size was 3.25.

The median age in the city was 30.6 years. 28.9% of residents were under the age of 18; 12.1% were between the ages of 18 and 24; 27.4% were from 25 to 44; 24% were from 45 to 64; and 7.7% were 65 years of age or older. The gender makeup of the city was 49.2% male and 50.8% female.

=== 2000 census ===
As of the census of 2000, there were 504 people, 166 households, and 130 families living in the city. The population density was 510.5 inhabitants per square mile (197.1/km^{2}). There were 173 housing units at an average density of 175.2 per square mile (67.6/km^{2}). The racial makeup of the city was 87.30% White, 1.98% Native American, 0.20% Asian, 8.53% from other races, and 1.98% from two or more races. Hispanic or Latino of any race were 11.90% of the population.

There were 166 households, out of which 53.6% had children under the age of 18 living with them, 63.9% were married couples living together, 10.8% had a female householder with no husband present, and 21.1% were non-families. 17.5% of all households were made up of individuals, and 4.8% had someone living alone who was 65 years of age or older. The average household size was 3.04 and the average family size was 3.41.

In the city, the population was spread out, with 35.7% under the age of 18, 9.1% from 18 to 24, 33.5% from 25 to 44, 14.3% from 45 to 64, and 7.3% who were 65 years of age or older. The median age was 30 years. For every 100 females, there were 102.4 males. For every 100 females age 18 and over, there were 102.5 males.

The median income for a household in the city was $42,273, and the median income for a family was $44,167. Males had a median income of $30,000 versus $20,481 for females. The per capita income for the city was $16,296. About 1.5% of families and 4.6% of the population were below the poverty line, including 2.8% of those under age 18 and 5.1% of those age 65 or over.
