= KDSN (AM) =

- Denison, Iowa; United States
- Frequency: 1530 kHz

Programming
- Format: Country
- Affiliations: ABC News Radio

Ownership
- Owner: Wireless Communications Corp.; (Crawford County Broadcasting Corp.)
- Sister stations: KDSN-FM

History
- First air date: 1956

Technical information
- Licensing authority: FCC
- Facility ID: 39380
- Class: D
- Power: 500 watts day 13 watts night
- Transmitter coordinates: 42°02′10″N 95°19′44″W

Links
- Public license information: Public file; LMS
- Webcast: Listen Live
- Website: www.kdsnradio.com

KDSN (1530 kHz) is a commercial AM radio station serving the Denison, Iowa area. The station primarily broadcasts an agricultural programming and folk music format. KDSN is licensed to Crawford County Broadcasting Corp.

Former logo
