= KDSN-FM =

Radio station in Denison, Iowa

Coordinates: 42°02′10″N 95°19′44″W

- Denison, Iowa; United States
- Frequency: 104.9 MHz

Programming
- Format: Adult contemporary
- Affiliations: ABC News Radio; Westwood One

Ownership
- Owner: Crawford County Broadcasting Corp.
- Sister stations: KDSN

History
- First air date: 1968 (at 107.1)
- Former frequencies: 107.1 MHz (1968–2020)

Technical information
- Licensing authority: FCC
- Facility ID: 39381
- Class: A
- ERP: 6,000 watts
- HAAT: 92 m (302 ft)

Links
- Public license information: Public file; LMS
- Webcast: Listen Live
- Website: kdsnradio.com

KDSN-FM (104.9 MHz) is a commercial radio station that serves the Denison, Iowa area. The station broadcasts an adult contemporary format.

According to the KDSN website, the FM station began broadcasting at 107.1 FM in 1968.

The transmitter and broadcast tower are located on the northeast side of Denison. According to the Antenna Structure Registration database, the tower is 74 m (243 ft) tall with the FM broadcast antenna mounted at the 72 m (236 ft) level. The calculated height above average terrain is 92 m (302 ft). The FM antenna array is a FML-2E-HW manufactured by ERI.

KDSN-FM & KDSN stations carry a large amount of local news and farm information, with a mix of adult contemporary and classic rock on FM and country and polka on AM. They deliver the only city-grade signals to Denison.

In September 2018, UNW Media divested the station to JC Van Ginkel, James Field, James Van Ginkel, John Van Ginkel, & Rodney Christensen's Crawford County Broadcasting. The majority owners also operate KNOD-FM, Harlan Iowa and KJAN, Atlantic Iowa.

On January 14, 2020, the signal changed from 107.1 to 104.9 as planned in the transfer agreement between the current owners and UNW Media.
