= Lincoln, North Dakota =

- City
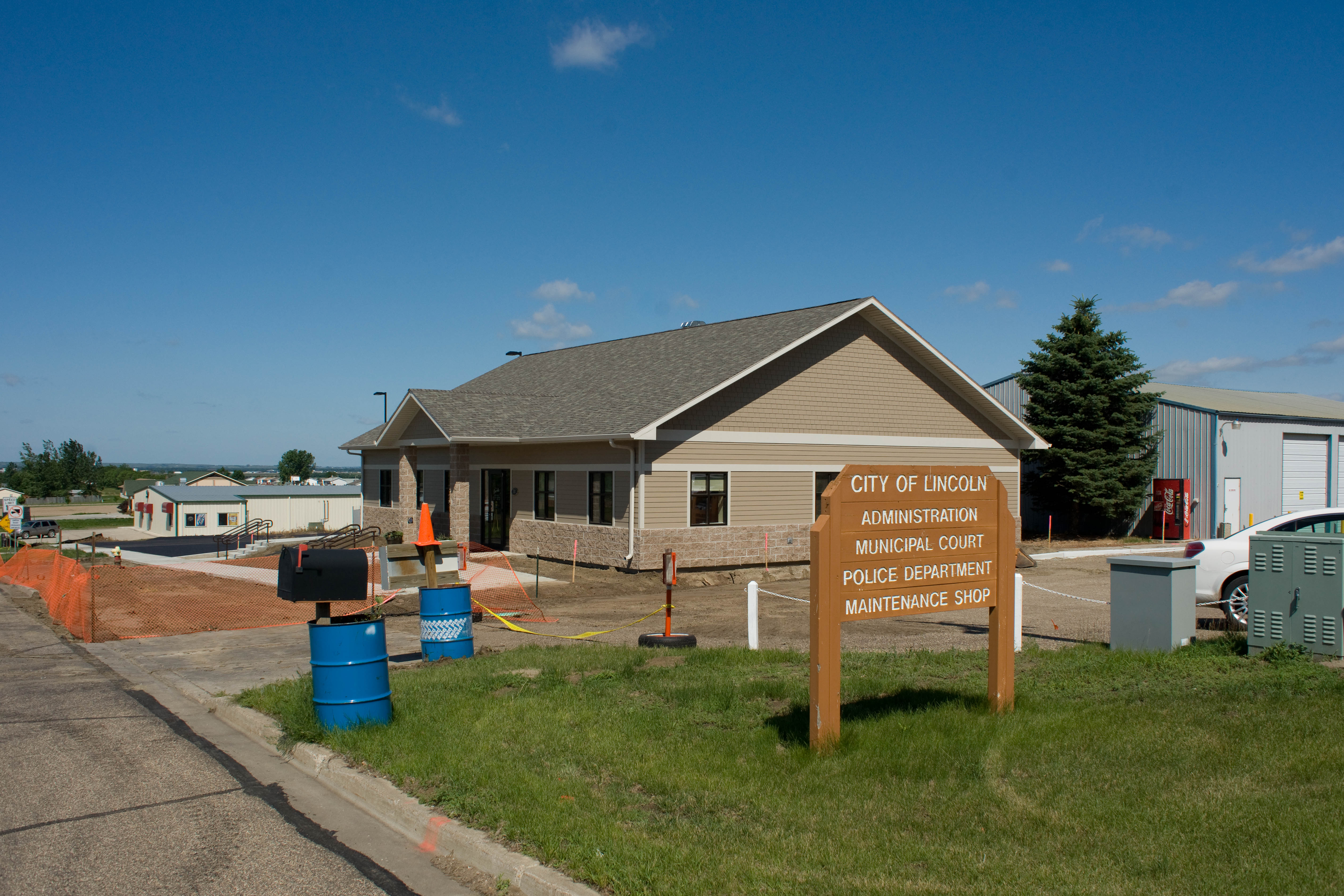
- Administrative Building in Lincoln

- Logo

- Location of Lincoln, North Dakota
- Coordinates: 46.768934°N 100.697738°W
- Country: United States
- State: North Dakota
- County: Burleigh
- Founded: 1977
- Incorporated: July 12, 1977

Government
  - Mayor: Keli Berglund
  - Administration: Amanda Davis
  - City Council: Derek Bjornstad; Anne Artavia
  - Public Safety: Carrie Praska

Area
  - Total: 1.551 sq mi (4.017 km^{2})
  - Land: 1.551 sq mi (4.017 km^{2})
  - Water: 0 sq mi (0.000 km^{2}) 0.00%
- Elevation: 1,690 ft (515 m)

Population (2020)
  - Total: 4,257
  - Estimate (2024): 4,502
  - Density: 2,903.4/sq mi (1,121.01/km^{2})
- Time zone: UTC–6 (Central (CST))
  - Summer (DST): UTC–5 (CDT)
- ZIP Code: 58504
- Area code: 701
- FIPS code: 38-46640
- GNIS feature ID: 1036131
- Sales tax: 7.0%
- Website: cityoflincolnnd.com

Lincoln is a city in Burleigh County, North Dakota, United States. It is a suburb of adjacent Bismarck, and also a core city of the Bismarck-Mandan Metropolitan Statistical Area. The population was 4,257 at the 2020 census, and was estimated to be 4,502 in 2024, making it the 15th most populous city in North Dakota. Lincoln was founded in 1977 and incorporated as a city on July 12, 1977.

== History ==
A Lincoln Township south of present-day Bismarck has been shown on maps dating back to 1872, when Edwinton – as Bismarck was originally known – was first platted. Efforts to formerly organize a township and city under the name of Lincoln have persisted, including one in 1965.

What is today considered the City of Lincoln was first established as a 300-acre, 492-lot housing development called Fort Lincoln Estates in 1972. It was originally considered part of Apple Creek Township. Billy Rippley was the principal developer. 24 homes were constructed by 1973.

Lincoln, along with eleven other sections of Apple Creek Township, entered the Bismarck Public School district through annexation in 1973.

Residents voted 312-185 to incorporate Lincoln as a city on July 12, 1977.

Lincoln Elementary opened in 2014 – the first public school in the city. Prior to that, students were bused into Bismarck.

== Geography ==
According to the United States Census Bureau, the city has a total area of 1.551 square miles (4.02 km^{2}), all land.

== Climate ==
This climatic region is typified by large seasonal temperature differences, with warm to hot (and often humid) summers and cold (sometimes severely cold) winters. According to the Köppen Climate Classification system, Lincoln has a humid continental climate, abbreviated "Dfb" on climate maps.

== Demographics ==
Historical population
Census	Pop.	Note	%±
1980	656		—
1990	1,132		72.6%
2000	1,730		52.8%
2010	2,406		39.1%
2020	4,257		76.9%
2024 (est.)	4,502		5.8%
U.S. Decennial Census; 2020 Census

According to realtor website Zillow, the average price of a home as of May 31, 2025, in Lincoln is $306,640.

As of the 2023 American Community Survey, there are 1,400 estimated households in Lincoln with an average of 3.08 persons per household. The city has a median household income of $83,387. Approximately 6.4% of the city's population lives at or below the poverty line. Lincoln has an estimated 83.5% employment rate, with 18.3% of the population holding a bachelor's degree or higher and 97.8% holding a high school diploma.

The top five reported ancestries (people were allowed to report up to two ancestries, thus the figures will generally add to more than 100%) were English (99.3%), Spanish (0.3%), Indo-European (0.4%), Asian and Pacific Islander (0.0%), and Other (0.0%).

=== Racial and ethnic composition ===
Lincoln, North Dakota – racial and ethnic composition Note: the US Census treats Hispanic/Latino as an ethnic category. This table excludes Latinos from the racial categories and assigns them to a separate category. Hispanics/Latinos may be of any race.
Race / ethnicity (NH = non-Hispanic)	Pop. 1990	Pop. 2000	Pop. 2010	Pop. 2020	% 1990	% 2000	% 2010	% 2020
White alone (NH)	1,107	1,683	2,274	3,710	97.79%	97.28%	94.51%	87.15%
Black or African American alone (NH)	0	4	22	51	0.00%	0.23%	0.91%	1.20%
Native American or Alaska Native alone (NH)	20	26	47	149	1.77%	1.50%	1.95%	3.50%
Asian alone (NH)	2	0	2	14	0.18%	0.00%	0.08%	0.33%
Pacific Islander alone (NH)	—	0	0	0	—	0.00%	0.00%	0.00%
Other race alone (NH)	0	0	1	1	0.00%	0.00%	0.04%	0.02%
Mixed race or multiracial (NH)	—	13	48	198	—	0.75%	2.00%	4.65%
Hispanic or Latino (any race)	3	4	12	134	0.27%	0.23%	0.50%	3.15%
Total	1,132	1,730	2,406	4,257	100.00%	100.00%	100.00%	100.00%

=== 2020 census ===
As of the 2020 census, there were 4,257 people in Lincoln. The median age was 31.5 years. 32.4% of residents were under the age of 18 and 7.1% were 65 years of age or older. For every 100 females, there were 106.0 males, and for every 100 females age 18 and over, there were 101.2 males age 18 and over.

Of residents, 0.0% lived in urban areas and 100.0% lived in rural areas.

There were 1,525 households and 1,134 families in the city. Of all households, 45.4% had children under the age of 18 living in them. About 57.4% were married-couple households, 16.7% were households with a male householder and no spouse or partner present, and 16.8% were households with a female householder and no spouse or partner present. About 18.8% of households were made up of individuals, and 4.9% had someone living alone who was 65 years of age or older.

There were 1,612 housing units, of which 5.4% were vacant. The homeowner vacancy rate was 1.4% and the rental vacancy rate was 13.1%. The population density was 2,744.68 inhabitants per square mile (1,059.7/km^{2}), and there were 1,039.33 per square mile (401.3/km^{2}) housing units per square mile.

The racial makeup of the city was 88.1% White, 1.2% African American, 3.8% Native American, 0.3% Asian, 0.0% Pacific Islander, 0.6% from some other races, and 5.9% from two or more races. Hispanic or Latino people of any race were 3.1% of the population.

=== 2010 census ===
As of the 2010 census, there were 2,406 people, 821 households, and 660 families living in the city. The population density was 2,148.2 inhabitants per square mile (829.4/km^{2}). There were 836 housing units at an average density of 746.4 per square mile (288.2/km^{2}). The racial makeup of the city was 94.64% White, 0.91% African American, 2.04% Native American, 0.12% Asian, 0.00% Pacific Islander, 0.12% from some other races and 2.16% from two or more races. Hispanic or Latino people of any race were 0.50% of the population.

There were 821 households, of which 51.3% had children under the age of 18 living with them, 63.8% were married couples living together, 9.6% had a female householder with no husband present, 6.9% had a male householder with no wife present, and 19.6% were non-families. 14.4% of all households were made up of individuals, and 2.6% had someone living alone who was 65 years of age or older. The average household size was 2.93 and the average family size was 3.22.

The median age in the city was 29.6 years. 32% of residents were under the age of 18; 8.3% were between the ages of 18 and 24; 35.9% were from 25 to 44; 20% were from 45 to 64; and 3.7% were 65 years of age or older. The gender makeup of the city was 51.3% male and 48.7% female.

=== 2000 census ===
As of the 2000 census, there were 1,730 people, 527 households, and 452 families living in the city. The population density was 1,700.3 inhabitants per square mile (656.5/km^{2}). There were 541 housing units at an average density of 531.7 inhabitants per square mile (205.3/km^{2}). The racial makeup of the city was 97.46% White, 0.23% African American, 1.50% Native American, 0.00% Asian, 0.00% Pacific Islander, 0.06% from some other races and 0.75% from two or more races. Hispanic or Latino people of any race were 0.23% of the population.

There were 527 households, out of which 63.2% had children under the age of 18 living with them, 67.9% were married couples living together, 13.9% had a female householder with no husband present, and 14.2% were non-families. 11.4% of all households were made up of individuals, and 1.5% had someone living alone who was 65 years of age or older. The average household size was 3.28 and the average family size was 3.53.

In the city, the population was spread out, with 40.2% under the age of 18, 6.8% from 18 to 24, 37.2% from 25 to 44, 13.6% from 45 to 64, and 2.2% who were 65 years of age or older. The median age was 27 years. For every 100 females, there were 100.2 males. For every 100 females age 18 and over, there were 99.0 males.

The median income for a household in the city was $38,884, and the median income for a family was $40,703. Males had a median income of $28,417 versus $18,438 for females. The per capita income for the city was $13,233. About 3.1% of families and 3.8% of the population were below the poverty line, including 5.3% of those under age 18 and 5.7% of those age 65 or over.

== Politics ==
Lincoln is governed by a City Council. The current mayor is Keli Berglund.

== Education ==
It is in the Bismarck Public Schools.

Residents are zoned to Lincoln Elementary School, Wachter Middle School and Bismarck High School.
