= Nashwauk, Minnesota =

City in Minnesota, United States

Nashwauk
- City
- Location of the city of Nashwauk within Itasca County, Minnesota
- Coordinates: 47°22′35″N 93°9′36″W
- Country: United States
- State: Minnesota
- County: Itasca
- Founded: 1902
- Incorporated: January 12, 1903

Government
  - Mayor: Greg Heybloom

Area
  - Total: 15.51 sq mi (40.17 km^{2})
  - Land: 14.81 sq mi (38.36 km^{2})
  - Water: 0.70 sq mi (1.81 km^{2})
- Elevation: 1,483 ft (452 m)

Population (2020)
  - Total: 970
  - Estimate (2022): 961
  - Density: 65.5/sq mi (25.29/km^{2})
- Time zone: UTC−6 (Central (CST))
  - Summer (DST): UTC−5 (CDT)
- ZIP Code: 55769
- Area code: 218
- FIPS code: 27-44980
- GNIS feature ID: 0648428
- Sales tax: 7.875%
- Website: nashwaukmn.gov

Nashwauk (/ˈnæʃwɔːk/ NASH-wawk) is a city in Itasca County, Minnesota, United States. The population was 970 at the 2020 census.

U.S. Highway 169 and Minnesota State Highway 65 are two of the main routes in Nashwauk.

== Geography ==
According to the United States Census Bureau, the city has a total area of 15.30 square miles (39.63 km^{2}), of which 14.58 square miles (37.76 km^{2}) is land and 0.72 square miles (1.86 km^{2}) is water.

== Demographics ==
Historical population
Census	Pop.	Note	%±
1910	2,080		—
1920	2,414		16.1%
1930	2,555		5.8%
1940	2,228		−12.8%
1950	2,029		−8.9%
1960	1,712		−15.6%
1970	1,341		−21.7%
1980	1,419		5.8%
1990	1,026		−27.7%
2000	935		−8.9%
2010	983		5.1%
2020	970		−1.3%
2022 (est.)	961		−0.9%
U.S. Decennial Census; 2020 Census

=== 2010 census ===
As of the census of 2010, there were 983 people, 452 households, and 258 families living in the town. The population density was 67.4 inhabitants per square mile (26.0/km^{2}). There were 551 housing units at an average density of 37.8 per square mile (14.6/km^{2}). The racial makeup of the town was 96.4% White, 0.9% Native American, 0.1% Asian, 0.1% from other races, and 2.4% from two or more races. Hispanic or Latino of any race were 0.8% of the population.

There were 452 households, of which 25.7% had children under the age of 18 living with them, 40.3% were married couples living together, 9.3% had a female householder with no husband present, 7.5% had a male householder with no wife present, and 42.9% were non-families. 37.8% of all households were made up of individuals, and 21.1% had someone living alone who was 65 years of age or older. The average household size was 2.17 and the average family size was 2.79.

The median age in the town was 42.4 years. 21.8% of residents were under the age of 18; 6.8% were between the ages of 18 and 24; 23.7% were from 25 to 44; 27.1% were from 45 to 64; and 20.5% were 65 years of age or older. The gender makeup of the town was 47.4% male and 52.6% female.

=== 2000 census ===
As of the census of 2000, there were 935 people, 434 households, and 266 families living in the town. The population density was 165.8 inhabitants per square mile (64.0/km^{2}). There were 467 housing units at an average density of 82.8 per square mile (32.0/km^{2}). The racial makeup of the town was 98.82% White, 0.53% Native American, 0.11% Asian, and 0.53% from two or more races. Hispanic or Latino of any race were 0.21% of the population. 24.1% were of German, 13.9% Italian, 9.9% Finnish, 8.9% Norwegian, 5.3% French and 5.2% American ancestry.

There were 434 households, out of which 23.3% had children under the age of 18 living with them, 48.8% were married couples living together, 9.9% had a female householder with no husband present, and 38.7% were non-families. 35.5% of all households were made up of individuals, and 21.2% had someone living alone who was 65 years of age or older. The average household size was 2.15 and the average family size was 2.74.

In the town, the population was spread out, with 20.2% under the age of 18, 8.8% from 18 to 24, 23.0% from 25 to 44, 23.6% from 45 to 64, and 24.4% who were 65 years of age or older. The median age was 43 years. For every 100 females, there were 90.4 males. For every 100 females age 18 and over, there were 88.4 males.

The median income for a household in the town was $26,146, and the median income for a family was $31,938. Males had a median income of $31,136 versus $20,000 for females. The per capita income for the town was $15,954. About 11.5% of families and 14.6% of the population were below the poverty line, including 19.9% of those under age 18 and 11.0% of those age 65 or over.

== Notable person ==
- Robert R. Gilruth – aviation and space pioneer who was born in Nashwauk.
- Joseph J.Dasovich- Sheriff Itasca County. Born in Nashwauk
