= University of Northwestern – St. Paul =

Private Christian college in Roseville, Minnesota, U.S.

- Former name: List: Northwestern Bible and Missionary Training School (1902–1944); Northwestern Theological Seminary (1935–1944); Northwestern Theological Seminary and the Bible School (1944–1956); Northwestern College (1956–2013)
- Type: Private university
- Established: October 2, 1902; 124 years ago
- Religious affiliation: Nondenominational Christian
- President: Corbin Hoornbeek
- Faculty: 15:1
- Students: 3,188
- Undergraduates: 1,406
- Other students: 1,686 Dual Enrollment Students
- Location: Roseville, Minnesota, United States; 45°2′16″N 93°10′9″W
- Campus: 106-acre (43 ha) campus on Lake Johanna; 15 buildings
- Colors: (Purple & gold)
- Nickname: Eagles
- Sporting affiliations: NCAA Division III – UMAC
- Mascot: Screech
- Website: unwsp.edu

The University of Northwestern – St. Paul (UNW) is a private evangelical Christian university in Roseville, Minnesota, United States.

== History ==
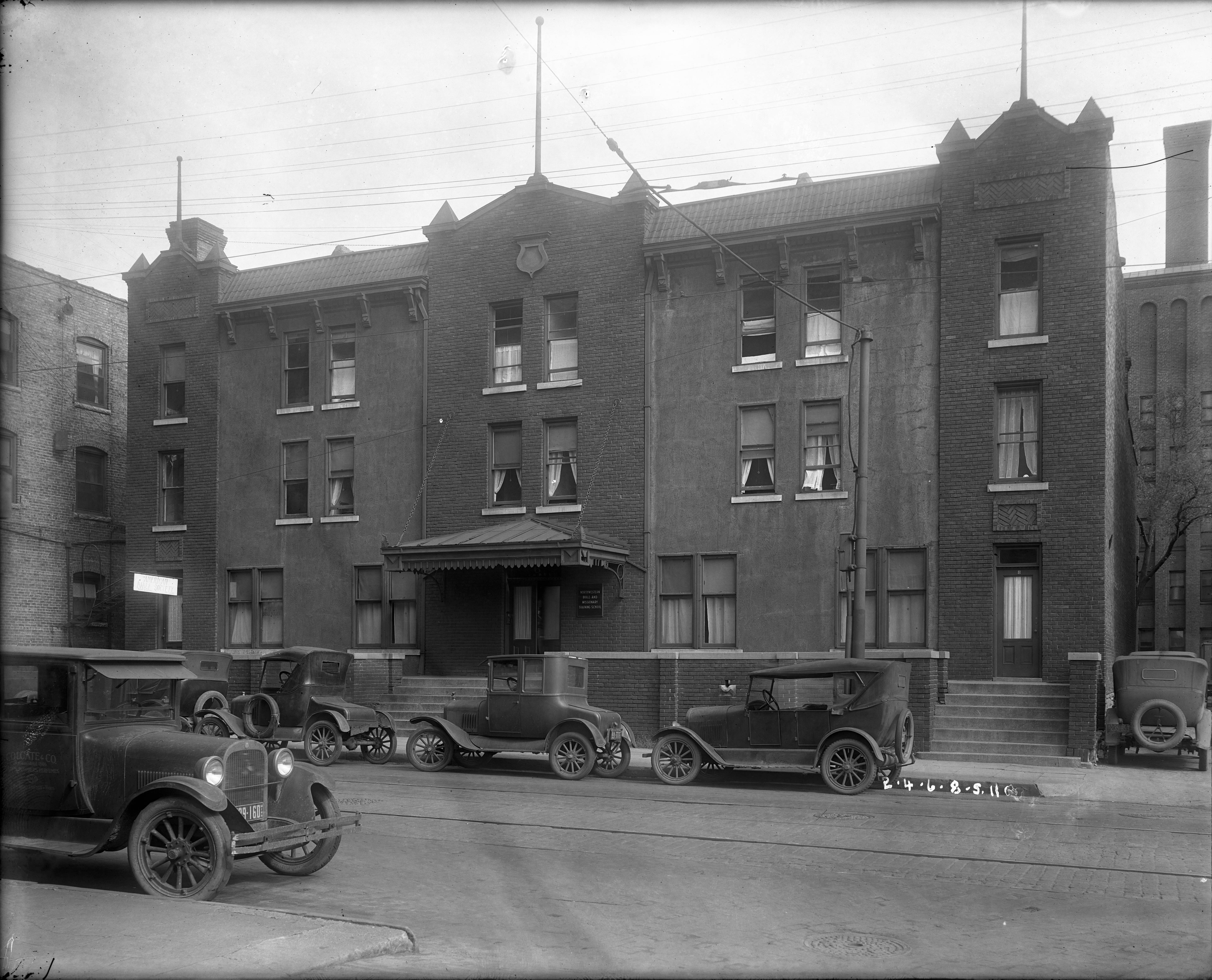
Early home of Northwestern Bible College on 11th Street South in Minneapolis

The predecessor to the current university was first established in 1902 as the Northwestern Bible and Missionary Training School by William Bell Riley, a pastor at First Baptist Church of Minneapolis. In October 1922, the school sponsored a lecture at the State Theater by William Jennings Bryan, who attacked science and scientists. This lecture would kickstart the anti-evolution movement in Minnesota.

In 1935, the school opened the Northwestern Evangelical Seminary. The College of Liberal Arts was added in 1944. In the late 1940s and early 1950s, the three schools were commonly known together as "The Northwestern Schools".

In 1951, the Bible school was rebranded as a Bible college and offered baccalaureate degrees alongside the college of liberal arts. In 1956, the seminary was closed, and the Bible college was subsumed into liberal arts college, renaming it Northwestern College. The school closed from 1966 to 1972 after failing to earn accreditation from the North Central Association, although it was eventually able to reopen after the purchase of the former Nazareth Hall Preparatory Seminary from the Archdiocese of Saint Paul and Minneapolis and the sale of its former campus in Loring Park. Accreditation was finally received in 1978. In 2013, Northwestern College was reorganized as a university under the current name University of Northwestern – St. Paul.

UNW also owns a chain of radio stations across the Midwest and Eastern United States, broadcasting listener-supported Christian music and teaching programs. Noted evangelist Billy Graham served as the school's second president from 1948 to 1952.

== Academics ==
The University of Northwestern offers over 50 areas of study, including offerings undergraduate programs, graduate programs, and adult education.

The Graduate Studies program offers the following graduate degrees:

- Master of Business Administration
- Master of Organizational Leadership
- Master of Divinity
- Master of Theological Studies
- Master of Ministry Leadership

Northwestern also offers a secondary major in Great Books & Ideas through their Classical Christian Honors College. This three-year classical education program supplements a student's primary major with Socratic seminar classes that cover the great works that have shaped western civilization.

In 2026, Northwestern alumni Dan and Robin Stoltz gave the largest single philanthropic commitment in Northwestern's history. In recognition of this gift, Northwestern renamed its school of business in honor of the Stoltzes.

=== Associations and accreditations ===
The university is a member of the Council for Christian Colleges and Universities and the Minnesota Private College Council.

University of Northwestern is accredited by the National Association of Schools of Music. The School of Nursing is approved by the Minnesota Board of Nursing and its baccalaureate degree is accredited by the Commission on Collegiate Nursing Education. The Bachelor of Science in Engineering program is accredited by the Engineering Accreditation Commission of ABET under the General Criteria (ABET).

== Media ==
In February 1949, the Northwestern Schools opened KTIS AM and KTIS-FM in the Twin Cities area, the first in a series of radio stations across the Upper Midwest.

Major markets served by Northwestern stations include the Twin Cities; Fargo; Duluth; Madison; Waterloo, Iowa; Des Moines; Rapid City; Sioux Falls; Hartford, Connecticut; Kansas City; and Omaha. Northwestern also operates the Faith Radio Network The mission statement for the University of Northwestern – St. Paul's media ministry is: "to lead people to Christ and to nurture them in their spiritual growth through Christ Centered media".

University of Northwestern – St. Paul students operate a campus radio station, theMEL.fm, and a student television station. theMEL.fm is a station that broadcasts on KTIS-HD3 as well as a live Internet stream.

== Performing arts ==
Music ensembles at Northwestern include the Northwestern Choir, UNW Orchestra, Symphonic Band, Jazz Band, Con Brio Men's Chorus, Amata Women's Chorale, Opera Workshop, and numerous chamber ensembles. University of Northwestern is accredited by the National Association of Schools of Music (NASM). The program has boasted awards from The American College Theatre Festival (ACTF). The Department of Music & Theatre hosts five theatrical productions each year with a total of 17,755 tickets sold in the 24-25 school year alone. The program has put on broadway titles such as The Prince of Egypt, Newsies, Mary Poppins, and Peter Pan.

Each year, the university puts on Christmas At Northwestern, a concert of worship that includes students from all of the major ensembles. The performance is widely attended and beloved by the surrounding community.

== Athletics ==
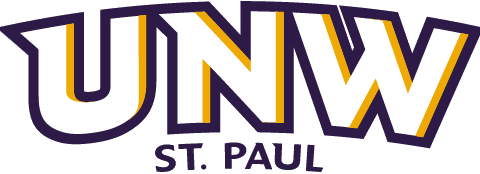
University of Northwestern – St. Paul athletics wordmark

The University of Northwestern – St. Paul's sponsors 18 varsity intercollegiate athletic sports, including football, women's volleyball, men's and women's soccer, men's and women's cross country, men's and women's golf, men's and women's basketball, baseball, softball, men's and women's indoor and outdoor track, men's and women's tennis, and men's and women's lacrosse. Northwestern is a member of the NCAA Division III, a Division I member of the National Christian College Athletic Association, and is one of nine full-time members of the Upper Midwest Athletic Conference (UMAC). Prior to its NCAA Division III membership, which began on a full-time basis prior to the 2008–2009 academic year, the Eagles were a member of the National Association of Intercollegiate Athletics (NAIA).

Since becoming a Division III member in 2008, the schools teams have earned bids to 32 NCAA Tournaments. In 2015 two University of Northwestern – St. Paul teams advanced to NCAA Sweet 16 appearances in men's basketball and women's volleyball. The Eagles volleyball team has advanced to ten of the last eleven NCAA Tournaments, 2 Sweet 16's (2015 & 2017), a Final Four (2016), and was a recipient of the NCAA's Sportsmanship Award for all divisions in 2009. The men's basketball team has also advanced to nine of the last ten NCAA national tournaments. The University of Northwestern – St. Paul became the first college football team in modern history to play two games on the same day. On October 8, 2005, under head coach Kirk Talley, the Eagles defeated Trinity Bible College 59–0 in a 12 noon kickoff before defeating Macalester College 6.5 miles down Snelling Avenue at 7 p.m. that night, 47–14. The UNW football team has won two NCCAA Victory Bowls in 2000 and 2008.

The University of Northwestern – St. Paul men's basketball team won the 2010 NCCAA Division I Men's Basketball National Tournament, defeating King College (Tennessee - NCAA Division II), for its first ever Division I championship by a score of 58–54.

University of Northwestern – St. Paul athletic and recreation facilities consist of the Ericksen Center (1996) (volleyball, men's and women's basketball) and the Reynolds Field complex (2014), which houses the Johnson Tennis Complex and 100 percent artificially turfed fields for baseball, softball, football, soccer and lacrosse. The outdoor facility also offers a running and jumping pit for track and field participants, a stadium, and four locker rooms.

== Notable alumni ==
- Jonathan Papik - justice of the Nebraska Supreme Court
- Roger Youderian - evangelical Christian missionary to Ecuador martyred in 1956
- Dallas Jenkins - film and television director, writer and film producer
- Sherman Augustus - actor and professional football player
- Brian Lohse - attorney and politician
- Elmer L. Towns - Christian academic, pastor, and writer who co-founded Liberty University

== See also ==
- List of colleges and universities in Minnesota
- Higher education in Minnesota
