= Mass media in Duluth, Minnesota =

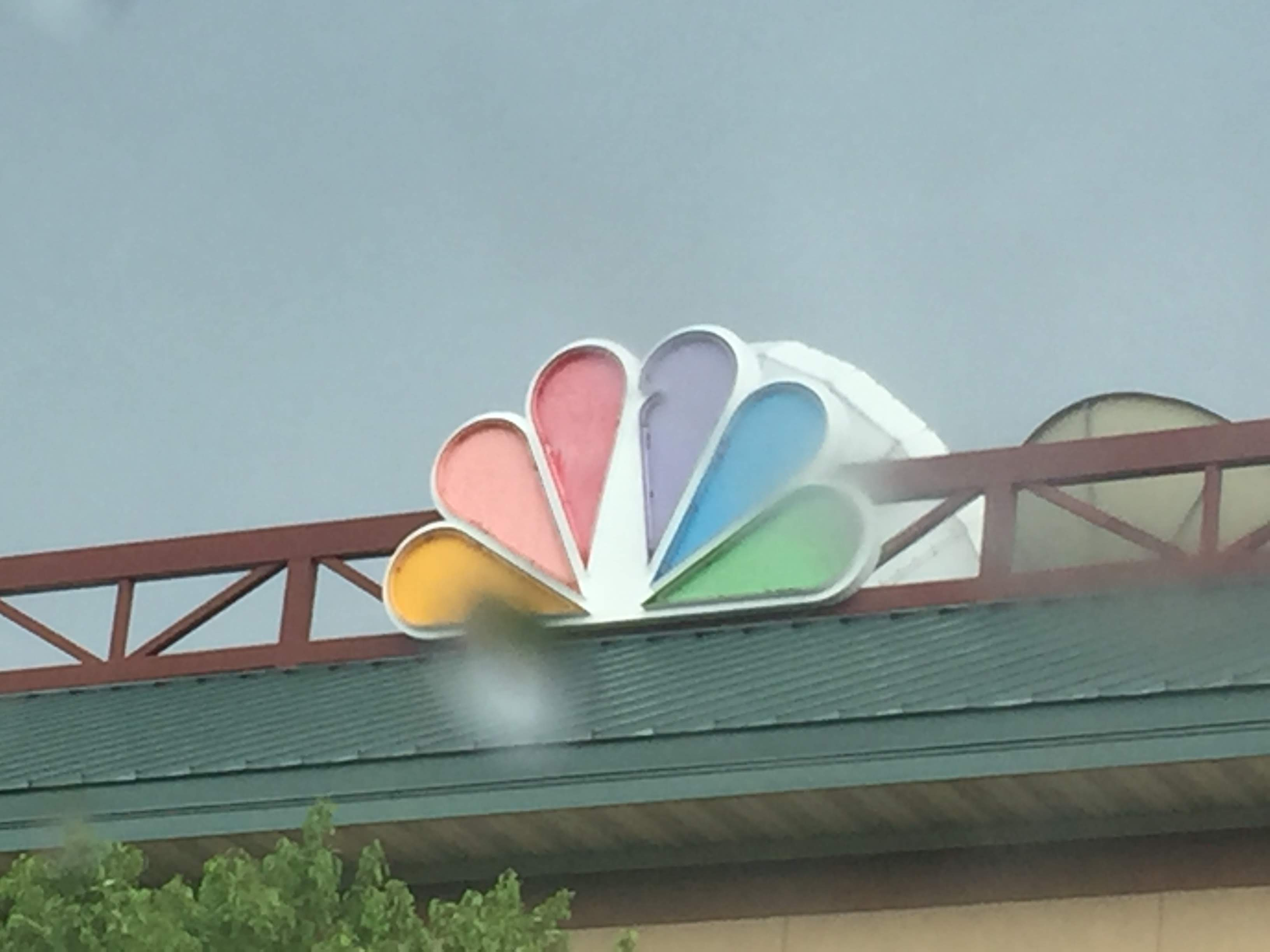
NBC logo on top of the KBJR-TV building in Canal Park.

This is a list of radio stations and television channels in Duluth, Minnesota. Most of the AM, FM and TV transmitters are located on the hills to the north of the city.

== AM radio ==
AM radio stations
Frequency	Call sign	Name	Format	Owner
560	WEBC	Sasquatch 106.5	Classic rock	Townsquare Media
610	KDAL	NewsTalk 610	News/Talk	Midwest Communications
710	WDSM		Talk	Midwest Communications
850	WQRM	VCY America	Christian	VCY America
970	WDUL		Sports	Midwest Communications
1230	WLKL		Adult standards	Fond du Lac Band of Lake Superior Chippewa
1490	KJOQ	1490 The Fan	Sports	Red River Broadcasting

== FM radio ==
FM radio stations
Frequency	Call sign	Name	Format	Owner
88.1	WWEN		Catholic	Real Presence Radio
88.5	WSSU		Public Radio	University of Wisconsin-Superior
89.1	WGZS	The Moon	Community radio	Fond du Lac Band of Lake Superior Ojibwe
89.5	WJRF	The Refuge	Contemporary Christian	Refuge Media Group
90.5	KDNI	Faith 90.5	Christian	University of Northwestern – St. Paul
90.9	W215CG (KZIO Translator)	The Current	AAA	Minnesota Public Radio
91.3	KUWS	Wisconsin Public Radio	Public Radio	University of Wisconsin-Superior
92.1	WWPE-FM	92.1 The Fan	Sports	Red River Broadcasting
92.9	WSCD	Classical MPR	Classical	Minnesota Public Radio
93.7	WGHF (LPFM)	3ABN	Christian	3ABN
94.1	K231BI (KZIO Translator)	The Current	AAA	Minnesota Public Radio
94.9	KQDS	95 KQDS	Classic rock	Red River Broadcasting
95.7	KDAL	My 95.7	Adult Contemporary	Midwest Communications
96.5	WKLK	K 96.5	Classic Rock	Fond du Lac Band of Lake Superior Chippewa
97.3	KDNW	Life 97.3	Contemporary Christian	University of Northwestern – St. Paul
97.7	W249CX (WQRM-AM Translator)	VCY America	Christian	VCY America
98.1	W251CD (WDSM-AM Translator)		Talk	Midwest Communications
98.9	KTCO	Kat Country 98.9	Country	Midwest Communications
100.5	WSCN	MPR News	Public Radio	Minnesota Public Radio
101.7	KLDJ	Kool 101.7	Classic Hits	Townsquare Media
102.5	KDKE	Duke FM	Classic Country	Midwest Communications
103.3	WDSE	The North	AAA	Duluth-Superior Area Educational Television Corporation
103.9	W280FB (KDAL-AM Translator)	NewsTalk 610	News/Talk	Midwest Communications
104.3	KZIO	The Current	AAA	Minnesota Public Radio
105.1	KKCB	B105	Country	Townsquare Media
106.5	W293CT (WEBC-AM Translator)	Sasquatch 106.5	Classic rock	Townsquare Media
107.3	WNXR		Classic hits	Heartland Comm. License, LLC
107.7	KBMX	Mix 108	Top 40 (CHR)	Townsquare Media

== Television ==
Duluth has experienced firsthand the consequences of media consolidation. On March 8, 2005 the sale of Duluth's CBS affiliate to Malara Broadcast Group of Sarasota, Florida was announced. The group agreed to pay Granite Broadcasting Group, which already runs the NBC affiliate KBJR, to take over the operations for KDLH. The majority of the news staff of KDLH was dismissed.

Channel	Callsign	Affiliation	Branding	Subchannels		Owner
(Virtual)	Callsign	Affiliation	Branding	Channel	Programming	Owner
3.1	KDLH	CW	CW 2	3.2; 3.3; 3.4; 3.5; 3.6	True Crime Network; Laff; Court TV; Ion Mystery; Quest	Gray Television
6.1	KBJR	NBC	KBJR 6	6.2; 6.3	CBS; MyNetworkTV/Heroes & Icons	Gray Television; licensed to Superior
8.1	WDSE	PBS		8.2; 8.3; 8.4; 8.5	PBS Second Chance; Create; Minnesota Channel; PBS Kids	Duluth-Superior Area Educational Television Corporation
10.1	WDIO	ABC		10.2; 10.3; 10.4; 10.5; 10.6	MeTV; Ion; Defy TV; Grit; Scripps News	Hubbard Broadcasting
21.1	KQDS	FOX		21.2	Antenna TV	Coastal Television Broadcasting Company
23.1	K23MQ-D	Circle				Gray Television
27.1	KCWV	TCT		27.2; 27.3; 27.4; 27.5; 27.7	SBN; Shop LC; Bounce TV; Start TV; Get	Total Christian Television
30.1	K30QX-D (KCWV Translator)	TCT		30.2; 30.3; 30.4; 30.5; 30.7	SBN; Shop LC; Bounce TV; Start TV; Get	Total Christian Television
32.6	KMYN-LD	Telemundo				SagamoreHill Broadcasting
