= KKCB =

Coordinates: 46.789°N 92.114°W

- Duluth, Minnesota; United States
- Broadcast area: Duluth-Superior
- Frequency: 105.1 MHz
- Branding: B105

Programming
- Format: Country
- Affiliations: Compass Media Networks

Ownership
- Owner: Townsquare Media; (Townsquare License, LLC)
- Sister stations: KBMX; KLDJ; WEBC; WWPE-FM

History
- First air date: January 15, 1966 (as WWJC-FM)
- Former call signs: WWJC-FM (1966–1970); WGGR (1970–1983); WAVC (1983–1996)
- Call sign meaning: "B105"

Technical information
- Licensing authority: FCC
- Facility ID: 49686
- Class: C1
- ERP: 100,000 watts
- HAAT: 241 m (791 ft)

Links
- Public license information: Public file; LMS
- Webcast: Listen live
- Website: b105country.com

KKCB (105.1 FM, "B105") is a radio station in Duluth, Minnesota, owned by Townsquare Media, airing a country music format.

The 105.1 frequency came into use in January 1966 when WWJC-FM launched. WWJC and its successor, WGGR, were primarily beautiful music stations. After being acquired in 1983, the station flipped to country as WAVC-FM and became one of the leading stations in Duluth. The present brand and call sign were adopted in 1996.

== History ==
The Twin Ports Christian Broadcasting Corporation, owner of radio station WWJC (1270 AM), applied to the Federal Communications Commission (FCC) on April 7, 1964, seeking authority to build a new FM radio station licensed to Superior, Wisconsin. It received a construction permit on July 1, 1964. WWJC-FM began broadcasting on January 15, 1966. It aired classical and semi-classical music as well as inspirational programming and news. After three years in operation, Twin Ports Christian sold off WWJC-FM in 1969 to a new corporation of Minneapolis investors: William Gregory, Herbert Gross, and Gordon Ritz. Ritz was a founding owner of the Minnesota North Stars and later served as the team's president. As part of the transaction, the new ownership, the Titanic Corporation, sought to change the city of license from Superior to Duluth. These applications were granted on March 11, 1970, Titanic relaunched the station as WGGR on July 17, 1970. Named for the last names of its three owners, it programmed a beautiful music format and broadcast in stereo. The station programmed just four commercial breaks an hour and limited talk, with news and weather reports kept to a minimum and no announcement of songs played. Ritz became the sole owner in 1976, and the licensee name was changed to ComRad Broadcasting Corporation in 1979.

In 1982, Midwest Radio of Duluth agreed to purchase WGGR from Ritz and general manager John Bartikoski. Midwest Radio owned Duluth AM station WEBC. Midwest relaunched the station on January 31, 1983, as WAVC with a country music format. It was the first Duluth-based FM country music station, arriving in town at the same time as a translator of WKKQ-FM from Hibbing. WEBC and WAVC were in turn sold to Northland Broadcasting—a subsidiary of Evansville, Indiana–based Brill Media—the next year.

As a country station, WAVC immediately eroded the listenership of Duluth's established country music outlet on AM, WDSM. Its program manager, Tim Michaels, told the News-Tribune & Herald that WDSM lost half its audience as a result of facing an FM competitor. After Michaels left WDSM to join WAVC, the station switched in 1989 from a satellite-fed format to a locally originated playlist, responding to a decline in ratings.

The relaunch of KTCO as a country station in 1994 prompted WAVC's ratings to decline, particularly among listeners, in the mid-1990s. As a result, in January 1996, station management opted to change tack. They fired Michaels—who sued, claiming the dismissal was based on his age. In March, the station was relaunched with new KKCB call letters and branded as B105. Between the spring and fall ratings surveys that year, KKCB increased its listenership to become the number-one station in Duluth. In 1999, the Brill cluster moved to studios on Central Entrance, which had previously been used by Color Tile.

Brill Media filed for bankruptcy reorganization in 2002 after missing a bond payment, which it attributed to the post-September 11 recession. The Brill Duluth cluster, which by this time consisted of four stations, was acquired by Regent Communications at auction. The company then traded the stations to Clear Channel Communications for Clear Channel's five-station cluster in Evansville, Indiana.

When Clear Channel was taken private in 2006, it opted to sell 448 stations located outside the top 100 radio markets. For more than $74 million, GapWest Broadcasting acquired the Duluth cluster and 56 other stations in four states. GapWest was folded into Townsquare Media in 2010. Townsquare moved its Duluth operations inside the Holiday Center downtown in 2019.
