= KQDS =

KQDS may refer to:

- KQDS-FM, a radio station (94.9 FM) licensed to serve Duluth, Minnesota, United States
- KQDS-TV, a television station (channel 18, virtual 21) licensed to serve Duluth, Minnesota
- KJOQ, a radio station (1490 AM) licensed to serve Duluth, Minnesota, which held the call sign KQDS from 1988 to 1997 and from 1999 to 2017
