= KDAL =

KDAL may refer to:

- KDAL (AM), a radio station (610 AM) licensed to Duluth, Minnesota, United States
- KDAL-FM, a radio station (95.7 FM) licensed to Duluth, Minnesota, United States
- KDLH, a television station (channel 3) licensed to Duluth, Minnesota, United States, which held the call sign KDAL-TV from 1954 until February 1979
- the ICAO code for Dallas Love Field in Dallas, Texas, United States
