= WMFG =

WMFG can refer to:

- WMFG (AM), a radio station (1240 AM) licensed to Hibbing, Minnesota, United States
- KQDX, formerly WMFG-FM, a radio station (106.3 FM) licensed to Hibbing, Minnesota, United States
