= WEEP (Minnesota) =

- Virginia, Minnesota; United States
- Frequency: 1400 kHz

Ownership
- Owner: Full Armor Ministries, Inc.

History
- First air date: October 12, 1936
- Last air date: November 2002
- Former call signs: WHLB (1936–2001)

Technical information
- Facility ID: 70307
- Class: C
- Power: 1,000 watts (unlimited)
- Transmitter coordinates: 47°30′32.7″N 92°32′31.7″W

WEEP (1400 AM) was a radio station licensed to serve Virginia, Minnesota. The station was last owned by Full Armor Ministries, Inc.

The station went on the air in 1936 as WHLB as part of Morgan Murphy's group of radio stations, and was owned by the Befera family from 1958 until 2001. It was then purchased by Full Armor Ministries, who programmed a religious radio format on the renamed WEEP until a transmitter fire took the station silent in 2002. Despite an attempt to sell the station to the city of Virginia, the WEEP license was not renewed before its expiration on April 1, 2005.

== History ==
The station began broadcasting on October 12, 1936, as WHLB, with a power of 250 watts. It was the ninth oldest station in Minnesota. WHLB, owned by Head of the Lakes Broadcasting, was part of the regional Arrowhead Network, along with WEBC in Duluth and WMFG in Hibbing; all three stations were principally owned by Morgan Murphy, publisher of the Superior Telegram in Wisconsin. Initially an independent station, WHLB joined the CBS Radio Network, along with WMFG, on October 31, 1937; advertising was sold in conjunction with KDAL, Duluth's CBS affiliate. The station would join the NBC Radio Network, along with WMFG, on January 1, 1942; advertising could be purchased in a package with WEBC. Both stations carried programming from both NBC networks: Red and Blue.

The station, along with WMFG in Hibbing, was purchased for $169,000 in 1958 by Harold J. Praise, the stations' general manager, and Frank P. Befera, a pioneer in Minnesota broadcasting. Ownership of WHLB and WHLB-FM 107.1 (which signed on in 1971) would pass to Befera's son Frank in 1985. The station remained in the Befera family (doing business as Virginia Broadcasting Company) until it was sold to Full Armor Ministries of Eveleth, Minnesota in 2001, for a reported sale price of $52,000; Virginia Broadcasting retained WUSZ, the former WHLB-FM. Ahead of the sale, WHLB went off the air on October 1, 2000. The sale gained Federal Communications Commission (FCC) approval on February 13, 2001; on March 7, the station was assigned the WEEP call letters. The new owners programmed WEEP with Christian music.

WEEP went silent following a transmitter fire in November 2002; Full Armor, which did not have the money to put the station back on the air, then put it up for sale. The tower, lacking basic maintenance, was described as "rusting away" during an August 2005 visit by radio journalist Scott Fybush.

Efforts to sell the station to the city of Virginia were complicated and ultimately thwarted by licensee Full Armor Ministries' failure to file a timely license renewal. A renewal application was not filed by December 1, 2004; the license expired on April 1, 2005, and was canceled on June 27, 2006. In January 2008, the FCC denied a petition for reconsideration from the (now former) licensee and the city.

In 2008, the city of Virginia gave permission to a local firm to dismantle the former studio building and radio tower. The building was moved and the tower taken down. Today, only a small grove of trees marks the area where the radio station was located. The city hoped that the site would eventually be used for future economic endeavors.
