= KQDS-FM =

Radio station in Duluth, Minnesota

Coordinates: 46.794°N 92.118°W

- Duluth, Minnesota; United States
- Broadcast area: Duluth-Superior
- Frequency: 94.9 MHz
- RDS: PI: 3AA0; PS/RT: Title BY Artist on 95 KQDS
- Branding: 95 KQDS

Programming
- Format: Classic rock
- Affiliations: United Stations Radio Networks

Ownership
- Owner: Midwest Communications; (Midwest Communications, Inc.)
- Sister stations: KDAL; KDAL-FM; KDKE; KTCO; WDSM; WDUL

History
- First air date: April 1, 1976 (as KAOH-FM)
- Former call signs: KAOH-FM (1976–1980); KQDS-FM (1980–1981); KQDS (1981–1988)
- Call sign meaning: "Quality Duluth-Superior" (modeled after KQRS-FM in Minneapolis)

Technical information
- Licensing authority: FCC
- Facility ID: 65660
- Class: C1
- ERP: 100,000 watts
- HAAT: 258 m (846 ft)
- Repeater: 106.3 KQDX (Hibbing)

Links
- Public license information: Public file; LMS
- Webcast: Listen live
- Website: www.95kqds.com

KQDS-FM (94.9 MHz, "95 KQDS") is a classic rock music formatted radio station located in Duluth, Minnesota. Established in 1976 as KAOH-FM, the station is owned by Midwest Communications, and follows a format similar to that of the well-known KQRS-FM in the Twin Cities.

The studios are located in downtown Duluth, along with KDAL, KDAL-FM, KDKE, KTCO, WDSM, and WDUL.

KQDS-FM is simulcast on KQDX (106.3) in Hibbing. Prior to Midwest selling the stations, KQDS-FM was also simulcast on WXXZ (95.3 FM, later WFNX) in Grand Marais and KAOD (106.7 FM, now KZJZ) in Babbitt. KQ 95's main competitor is Townsquare Media's WWPE (92.1 FM).

KQDS-FM is probably best known for "The KQ Morning Show" which for the last decade has been rated first among adults 25-54 and Men 25–54. The show's longtime host, Bill Jones left the station, the broadcast industry and the city of Duluth December 15, 2009. Jones' Co-host, Jason Manning has returned to KQ with a "revamped" morning show with new co-host Frank Befera. In 2011, Befera was let go and the Morning Show switched to its current line-up of Jason Manning and longtime afternoon DJ Scott Savage.

== History ==
The station signed on April 1, 1976, as KAOH-FM, a country music station. In 1980, the station became KQDS-FM, a progressive rock station. The original on-air staff included Stu Taran, Big G Walters, Annie Steamer, Dan Culhane, Jonathon Hanley, Tony Jasmin, Bruce MacGregor, Marty Essen, and Lisa Barr. The general manager was Mark Alan. On August 1, 1981, the station boosted its power to 100,000 watts and became a classic rock station.

On August 24, 2016, Midwest Communications announced that it was purchasing KQDS-FM, WXXZ, and KAOD from Red Rock Radio in a deal that also included sister stations WEVE-FM in Eveleth and KGPZ in Coleraine, as well as translators W221AU, W252AN, and W288AI; the sale was completed on December 31, 2016, at a purchase price of $5.625 million.

Effective September 22, 2017, Midwest sold KQDS-FM's simulcast partners WXXZ and KAOD, along with translator W288AI, to Aurora Broadcasting L.L.C.
