= WWPE-FM =

- Hermantown, Minnesota; United States
- Broadcast area: Duluth-Superior
- Frequency: 92.1 MHz
- Branding: Sasquatch 92.1

Programming
- Format: Mainstream rock
- Affiliations: Compass Media Networks; United Stations Radio Networks

Ownership
- Owner: Townsquare Media; (Townsquare License, LLC)
- Sister stations: KBMX, KKCB, KLDJ, WEBC

History
- First air date: June 17, 1996
- Former call signs: WWAX (1996–2020)

Technical information
- Licensing authority: FCC
- Facility ID: 26004
- Class: C3
- ERP: 5,400 watts
- HAAT: 215 meters (705 ft)
- Transmitter coordinates: 46°47′41″N 92°07′05″W

Links
- Public license information: Public file; LMS
- Webcast: Listen live
- Website: squatchrocks.com

WWPE-FM (92.1 FM, "Sasquatch 92.1") is a radio station licensed to Hermantown, Minnesota, United States, and serves the Twin Ports. Established in 1996, the station is owned by Townsquare Media, through licensee Townsquare License, LLC. It airs a mainstream rock format with studios located in Duluth's downtown and transmitter sited off South Blackman Avenue, in the Duluth antenna farm.

== History ==
The station signed on in 1996 as WWAX, carrying a modern adult contemporary satellite feed. The call sign was similar to the WAKX call sign formerly used by WDUL and KTCO. A change to local programming was made in 1997. WWAX branded itself as "92.1 Kiss FM" until being warned by Clear Channel (now iHeartMedia) which holds the trademark for the "Kiss" moniker. The station changed its moniker to "92.1 The Beat" by 2004. It had fluctuated between the formats of modern AC, hot AC, top 40 (CHR) and adult CHR from 1997 to early 2007, and competed with KBMX "Mix 108".

92.1 The Beat tweaked its format to rhythmic leaning CHR in February 2007, and went adult contemporary as "92.1 Lite FM" on February 29, 2008.

In October 2008, announcements were already made on the station's webpage that "A 'Lite' Christmas was coming soon". By November 1 of that year, 92.1 Lite was playing all Christmas music around the clock. For 2009, the station started around the clock Christmas music during the middle of November instead of at the beginning.

On September 2, 2010, WWAX changed its format to hot adult contemporary, branded as "NU 92" (pronounced as "New 92"). This came just after 102.5 flipped from classic rock to top 40 (CHR) as KDWZ on August 30, with NU 92 and KDWZ both competing with KBMX on both sides of the pop music spectrum.

On March 2, 2015, WWAX changed its format to sports, branded as "92.1 The Fan". Much of its programming originated from the "Fan Radio Network", based at KFXN-FM in Minneapolis–St. Paul.

On April 19, 2017, Red Rock Radio announced that it would sell WWAX and KQDS to Twin Ports Radio for $200,000; through a time brokerage agreement, Twin Ports assumed control of the stations on May 1. Twin Ports' owner, Dan Hatfield, also ran Christian radio station WJRF; following the sale, WWAX and KQDS moved their studios to WJRF's facilities, but retained their sports formats. The sale was consummated on June 30, 2017.

On January 30, 2020, Townsquare Media announced that it would acquire WWAX; it assumed control of the station via local marketing agreement on February 1, at which point the classic rock format of WEBC began simulcasting on WWAX as "Sasquatch 92.1", with the sports talk format moving to WEBC as "Fan 106.5" on February 17. The $370,000 sale to Townsquare was completed on October 9; on October 20, the call sign was changed to WWPE-FM.

On April 7, 2025, WWPE-FM shifted their format from classic rock to mainstream rock, adding more 90s, 2000s, and current rock music to the station’s playlist, while also changed its slogan from “Real Classic Rock For The Northland” to “Real Rock For The Northland”. Before then, there was no radio station in the Duluth-Superior area that played new rock since KZIO 94.1/104.3 (known as “94X” at that time) were sold to MPR and flipped to AAA as “The Current” in 2017 and KDAL-FM (known as “Rock 96” at that time) changed its format to adult contemporary as “FM 95.7” in 2014 (FM 95.7 rebranded to My 95.7 in 2015).
