= KZIO =

Coordinates: 46.941°N 91.983°W

Satellite of KCMP, Northfield/Minneapolis–Saint Paul
- Two Harbors, Minnesota; United States
- Broadcast area: Duluth-Superior
- Frequency: 104.3 MHz
- RDS: PS: KZIO; RT: Current
- Branding: 94.1/104.3 The Current

Programming
- Format: Adult Album Alternative (KCMP simulcast)

Ownership
- Owner: American Public Media Group; (Minnesota Public Radio)
- Sister stations: WSCD-FM, WSCN

History
- First air date: September 1995; 30 years ago (as WRSR) (as WRSR)
- Former call signs: WRSR (1988–1997)

Technical information
- Facility ID: 68610
- Class: C2
- ERP: 50,000 watts
- HAAT: 121 meters (397 ft)
- Translator: 94.1 K231BI (Duluth)

Links
- Webcast: Listen Live
- Website: thecurrent.org

KZIO (104.3 / 94.1 FM) is a non-commercial, listener-supported radio station licensed to Two Harbors, Minnesota, and serving the Duluth-Superior area. It is a satellite station to KCMP, Minnesota Public Radio's Adult Album Alternative (AAA) station known as "The Current." The station is owned by the American Public Media Group, parent organization of MPR. KZIO has inserts for local weather, underwriting messages, and a local music program that airs on Sunday evenings.

KZIO is a Class C2 FM station. It has an effective radiated power (ERP) of 50,000 watts. Programming is also heard on FM translator 94.1 K231BI, which serves Duluth.

== History ==
The station signed on in September 1995. Its former owner was Red River Broadcasting, which also owned KQDS-TV channel 21, KQDS 1490, KQDS-FM 94.9, and WWAX 92.1 before deciding to sell the company's radio assets through 2015 into 2017. The studios under RRB ownership were located at Grandma's Marketplace in Canal Park in Duluth.

Its previous monikers were derived from its Duluth translator (low-power rebroadcaster), K231BI which operates at 94.1 FM. 104.3 FM can be heard in Duluth, though its signal is spotty. The former active rock format signed on as "X106" using 106.3 as the translator until upgrading to 94.1 FM.

The call letters KZIO were originally located at what is now KDKE 102.5 MHz in the same market. 102.5 KZIO aired a Top 40 format in the 1980s and 1990s until switching formats in 1996.

104.3 began as WRSR with a smooth jazz format in September 1995. After smooth jazz, it tried several adult-based radio formats until flipping to active rock in March 2003.

Over the years, 94X has aired some mainstream rock and classic rock music that is not typically a part of the active rock format in an effort to fend off rock-based formats at various competing stations.

Past and Present 94X DJ's include Zooch, Hans, The Kid, Ray, Ace Rockolla, The Milkman, Diesel, Smiling Mike, Alli Foxx, Todd Spoons and Skid Mark.

On February 27, 2017, Red Rock announced plans to sell KZIO and K231BI to Minnesota Public Radio for $300,000. The station switched to a non-commercial operation. MPR confirmed late in March that the station would carry their The Current network in the market upon the sale's closing.

The application to transfer the licenses was granted on April 24, 2017. The transaction closed on May 15, and KZIO went silent after the sale closing during a transition period. MPR asked for a waiver to operate the station remotely as a satellite of "The Current"'s main station KCMP. KZIO returned to the air and began broadcasting The Current in the first week of June 2017.
