= KBMX =

Radio station in Proctor–Duluth, Minnesota

Coordinates: 46.787°N 92.122°W

- Proctor, Minnesota; United States
- Broadcast area: Duluth-Superior
- Frequency: 107.7 MHz
- Branding: MIX 108

Programming
- Format: Contemporary hits
- Affiliations: Compass Media Networks; Premiere Networks; United Stations Radio Networks

Ownership
- Owner: Townsquare Media; (Townsquare License, LLC)
- Sister stations: KKCB, KLDJ, WEBC, WWPE-FM

History
- First air date: 1994
- Former call signs: KUSZ (1994–2002)
- Call sign meaning: "Best Mix"

Technical information
- Licensing authority: FCC
- Facility ID: 4588
- Class: C2
- ERP: 7,700 watts
- HAAT: 278 meters (912 ft)

Links
- Public license information: Public file; LMS
- Webcast: Listen live
- Website: mix108.com

KBMX (107.7 FM, "MIX 108") is a commercial radio station licensed to Proctor, Minnesota, United States, and serving the Duluth-Superior market. It is owned by Townsquare Media and it airs a contemporary hit format. Along with three sister stations, KBMX has its offices and studios at 14 E. Central Entrance, on the west side of Duluth. KBMX's transmitter is sited on Observation Road in Duluth.

== History ==
The station signed on the air in 1994 as KUSZ. It started out with a country music format simulcasting WUSZ 99.9. Then it was known as "Z-Rock," airing a classic rock format. It later flipped to adult contemporary as "The Point".

After becoming a Hot AC station as Mix 108 on April 1, 2002, the station gradually evolved to a Top 40 (CHR) sound. The station had aired Open House Party on weekends. For a time, it had Top 40/CHR competition from WWAX "92.1 The Beat". That station is now "Sasquatch 92.1" airing classic rock. It then got Top 40/CHR competition from KDWZ (now classic country KDKE "102.5 Duke FM") and Hot AC WWAX as "Nu 92" (now classic rock WWPE).

These days, Mix 108 serves as one of two Top 40 stations for the Duluth-Superior area, competing against AM 970 and FM 98.1 WDUL "Hot 98.1".
