= KQDS-TV =

Television station in Duluth, Minnesota

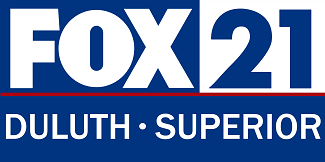
- Duluth, Minnesota; Superior, Wisconsin; United States
- City: Duluth, Minnesota
- Channels: Digital: 18 (UHF); Virtual: 21
- Branding: Fox 21

Programming
- Affiliations: 21.1: Fox; 21.2: Antenna TV

Ownership
- Owner: Coastal Television Broadcasting Company LLC; (CTMN License LLC)

History
- Founded: December 9, 1991
- First air date: March 21, 1995
- Former call signs: KRBR (1991−1994); KNLD (1994–1999)
- Former channel numbers: Analog: 21 (UHF, 1994–2009); Digital: 17 (UHF, 2001–2020)
- Former affiliations: Independent (1994–1999)
- Call sign meaning: Quality Duluth–Superior (from former sister station KQDS-FM)

Technical information
- Licensing authority: FCC
- Facility ID: 35525
- ERP: 1,000 kW
- HAAT: 297 m (974 ft)
- Transmitter coordinates: 46°47′37″N 92°7′4″W
- Translator(s): see § Translators

Links
- Public license information: Public file; LMS
- Website: www.fox21online.com

KQDS-TV (channel 21) is a television station in Duluth, Minnesota, United States, affiliated with the Fox network. Owned by Coastal Television Broadcasting Company, the station has studios on London Road in Duluth (along I-35), and its transmitter is located west of downtown in Hilltop Park. Master control and some internal operations are based out of the studio facilities of co-owned station and fellow Fox affiliate KVRR on South 40th Street and South 9th Avenue in Fargo, North Dakota.

== History ==
The station first signed on the air on March 21, 1995, as KNLD, the Duluth–Superior market's first independent station. Very few people knew it was actually on the air at this time, as it transmitted at low power with an extremely limited schedule of programming, usually airing for only three hours per day each morning—the minimum required by the Federal Communications Commission (FCC) to cover the license, due to ongoing negotiations with Granite Broadcasting, owner of KBJR-TV. While the Northland had grown large enough to support an independent station at least a decade earlier, it is a very large market geographically. UHF stations do not cover large areas very well. Additionally, the major stations in the market need sizable networks of translators to adequately cover the market, and the cost of building a translator network scared off perspective owners. By the 1990s, cable television—a must for acceptable television in much of this market—had gained enough penetration to make an independent station viable. In addition, two independent stations from the Minneapolis–Saint Paul market—KMSP-TV and WFTC—were present on some of the area's cable providers.

Although its lineup once included syndicated Big Ten college football (since returned as network coverage), most of the station's schedule was filled with programming from the Shop at Home Network by the late 1990s.

In 1998, Red River Broadcasting (via sister company KQDS Acquisition Corporation) purchased KNLD and several area radio stations including KQDS (1490 AM), KQDS-FM (94.9 FM), WWAX (92.1 FM) and KZIO (94.1 and 104.3 FM), and later changed the television station's call sign to KQDS-TV. The new owners immediately set about giving the station a technical overhaul, but not without controversy. They had won a construction permit for a new tower to replace its old transmitter facility located adjacent to Duluth Central High School, which would give it a coverage area comparable to the other Duluth stations. However, some school and city officials expressed concern about the danger of ice falling from the tower onto the school's parking lot. Eventually, Red River agreed to build the tower further from the parking lot than initially planned.

On September 1, 1999, KQDS-TV activated its new transmitter tower, along with the sign-on of eight translators. That same day, the station became the Duluth–Superior market's first Fox affiliate. Prior to affiliating with the network, Fox programming was available in the market only through cable systems that had carried the network through KMSP-TV (which served as the network's affiliate from 1986 to 1988) and later WFTC (which became an affiliate of the network in late 1988 and lost the network back to KMSP-TV in 2002), with Foxnet being carried in areas where neither station was available via cable. Some areas of the market received Fox on cable from KVRR from Fargo (KQDS' sister station), WLUK from Green Bay (which replaced WGBA-TV in 1995), WGKI from Cadillac, Michigan, or even WKBD from Detroit (prior to that station disaffiliating from the network in 1994).

On November 30, 2021, Forum Communications (owner of ABC affiliate WDAY-TV in Fargo) announced its intent to purchase KQDS, as well as KVRR and its satellites, from Red River Broadcasting for $24 million. Forum had sought a waiver from the FCC allowing it to own a second top–four ranked full-power station in the Fargo–Grand Forks market, though it would not consolidate the newsrooms of WDAY and KVRR. In the absence of FCC action, the deal was terminated in June 2023. On December 1, 2023, it was announced that Red River would sell the stations to the Coastal Television Broadcasting Group; the sale was completed on April 5, 2024.

== News operation ==
In its early years as a Fox affiliate, KQDS entered into a news share agreement with NBC affiliate KBJR to produce a 9 p.m. newscast; the program was broadcast out of KBJR's studios on South Lake Avenue in Duluth, and was anchored by Mark Mallory with weather and sports segments respectively helmed by meteorologist Paul Heggen and sports anchor Tom Hansen. The program was canceled after about nine months due to low ratings, and was replaced by a half-hour simulcast of CNN Headline News. KBJR would not produce a prime time newscast again until September 2002, when that station launched a UPN affiliate on its second digital subchannel.

In its first ratings period in May 2007, KQDS placed third among all evening newscasts in the Duluth market. The station drew more viewers than KBJR's Northland's NewsCenter Tonight at 9 and KDLH's 10 p.m. newscast. In August of that year, after just six months on the air, KQDS's news operation was nominated for three Upper Midwest Emmy Awards in the categories of "Best Newscast", "Best News Special" and "Investigative Series". In July 2009, KQDS registered its best newscast ratings period to date, placing third with about 8,650 viewers (about 2,000 fewer viewers than KBJR's 10 p.m. newscast). In the fall of 2009, the station won two regional Emmy Awards for "Best Newscast" and "Overall Station Excellence". On June 28, 2010, KQDS debuted a half-hour weeknight newscast at 6 p.m.

=== Notable former on-air staff ===
- Tracee Carrasco – weekend anchor/reporter

== Technical information ==
=== Subchannels ===
The station's signal is multiplexed:

Subchannels of KQDS-TV
Channel	Res.	Short name	Programming
21.1	720p	KQDS-DT	Fox
21.2	480i	Antenna	Antenna TV (4:3)

=== Analog-to-digital conversion ===
KQDS-TV discontinued regular programming on its analog signal, over UHF channel 21, on February 1, 2009. The station's digital signal remained on its pre-transition UHF channel 17, using virtual channel 21.

=== Translators ===
Nine translators relay KQDS-TV's programming to areas of the market outside its primary signal contour. All of the translators, except for K31GH and K39GG, had construction permits to air low-power digital signals, but the permits expired without any of the stations converting from analog to digital transmission. To comply with FCC mandates related to the digital television transition, all of the stations had to obtain new permits and convert to digital by September 1, 2015, in order to remain on the air. On April 24, 2015, it was announced that the conversion date for standard LPTVs and translators still broadcasting in analog had been suspended until further notice, due to economic problems that may arise from the then-upcoming spectrum auction. After the auction's completion in 2017, the FCC announced on May 12 of that year that all analog low-power stations and transmitters must convert by July 13, 2021.

All translators except for K39GG have been upgraded to digital as of November 1, 2016, and remap to virtual channel 21.

- W15EE-D Ashland, WI
- K21KY-D Bigfork–Marcell, MN
- K29EB-D Grand Rapids, MN
- K31GH-D Hayward, WI
- K15GT-D Hibbing, MN
- K20NR-D International Falls, MN
- W32CV-D Ironwood, MI
- K33OG-D Max, MN
- K22MR-D Virginia, MN

==== Defunct translator ====
K39GG in Aitkin, Minnesota, went silent sometime in June 2018, and its license was canceled by the FCC on June 27, 2018. KQDS stated the translator's viewership was insufficient to support its continued operation. It also was located in the Minneapolis–Saint Paul television market, which is claimed by KMSP-TV, and Fox has strictly enforced stations remaining in their DMA boundaries since the early 2010s in their affiliation agreements for ratings tabulation purposes.
