= Weep (disambiguation) =

One who weeps is crying.

Weep or WEEP may also refer to:

- Weep (architecture), a small opening that allows water to drain
- Weep (band), an American rock band from New York City
- WEEP (Minnesota), a defunct radio station in Virginia, Minnesota, U.S.
- WWNL, known as WEEP 1992–1995, a radio station in Pittsburgh, U.S.

== See also ==
- "Jesus wept", a phrase in the Bible
- Pleurants, or weepers, sculpted figures on a monument representing mourners
