= WEBC =

Coordinates: 46°38′36.8″N 91°59′9.7″W

- Duluth, Minnesota; United States
- Broadcast area: Duluth-Superior
- Frequency: 560 kHz
- Branding: Northland Fan

Programming
- Format: Sports
- Affiliations: KFXN-FM; Fox Sports Radio; Minnesota Vikings

Ownership
- Owner: Townsquare Media; (Townsquare License, LLC)
- Sister stations: KBMX, KKCB, KLDJ, WWPE-FM

History
- First air date: June 1, 1924
- Call sign meaning: Edwina and Barbara Clinton

Technical information
- Licensing authority: FCC
- Facility ID: 49689
- Class: B
- Power: 5,000 watts
- Translator: 106.5 W293CT (Duluth)

Links
- Public license information: Public file; LMS
- Webcast: Listen live
- Website: northlandfan.com

WEBC (560 AM) is a commercial radio station licensed to Duluth, Minnesota, United States, and serving the Duluth-Superior market. Owned by Townsquare Media and it airs a sports format known as "Northland Fan", an affiliate of KFXN-FM's statewide network. The studios and offices are on West Superior Street.

WEBC's transmitter is on Humane Society Road near U.S. Route 2 and U.S. Route 53 in the Parkland section of Superior. The AM station feeds FM translator W293CT at 106.5 MHz.

== History ==
=== Early years ===
WEBC is the oldest radio station in the Duluth-Superior market, signing on the air on June 1, 1924. It was founded by Leslie Ross, who owned Ross Electric Shop in Superior, Wisconsin. Ross ran WEBC as a hobby. It was funded on a "shoe-string budget" by proceeds from the store. WEBC was broadcast from a small top-floor room of the three-story Superior Evening Telegram newspaper building. On the roof were two towers, one on each end of the building, with the transmitting antenna hung between them, as was the manner of broadcast stations of the day.

Ross's tower engineer was Walter C. Bridges. He helped WEBC sign on, using 50 watts of power. The studios moved from Superior to Duluth in 1926. They were on the second floor of the Spalding Hotel. The city of license was later changed to Duluth, though WEBC's transmitter has always remained on the Wisconsin side of the bridge. In its early years, WEBC broadcast on 1240 kilocycles.

=== Pres. Calvin Coolidge ===
The station was temporarily raised to 500 watts in 1928 in order to provide radio service to President Calvin Coolidge, who was vacationing nearby. Charles B. Persons, who Ross hired at the age of 17 in 1926, produced and broadcast content that included details of Coolidge's activities, such as fishing on the Brule River in Wisconsin during his three-month vacation, as well as Mr. & Mrs. Coolidge touring the streets of Duluth by chauffeured motorcar to greet devoted supporters. The New York Times nicknamed WEBC "The President's Station." WEBC became an affiliate of the NBC Red Network at this time to provide the vacationing president with coverage of the national political conventions. Persons continued to work for WEBC for 28 years, covering local and national news, sports, presidential administrations and wars.

WEBC's owners founded WMFG in Hibbing, Minnesota, in 1935. The next year, the owners founded WHLB in Virginia, Minnesota. The three stations were linked for local programming as part of the Arrowhead Radio Network. WEBC's influence in regional programming was strengthened in 1942 when WMFG and WHLB switched to NBC from CBS.

WEBC and its NBC programming dominated the market in the 1930s and 1940s. Like most other stations during the "Golden Age of Radio", WEBC carried its network's dramas, comedies, news, sports, soap operas, game shows and big band broadcasts. The station relocated to 560 kHz in the mid-1950s after a series of upgrades and frequency changes. In 1955, with radio losing listeners to TV, WEBC dropped NBC and adopted a new format: Top 40. WEBC featured announcers such as Lance "Tac" Hammer, Jack McCoy, Lew Latto, Pat McKay, and "Doctor" Don Rose, among many others.

=== FM and TV stations ===
Bridges was an early adopter of FM radio and created a sister station in 1940, WEBC-FM. Unfortunately, few people owned FM receivers in that era and management doubted it could be made profitable. WEBC-FM went off the air in 1950.

Bridges and the Head of the Lakes Broadcasting Company applied to construct a television station in June 1949. But that television station never was built. Instead, WDSM 710 AM and KDAL 610 AM overcame their longtime rivalry by going into television first in 1953. WDSM-TV (now KBJR-TV) became an NBC-TV affiliate, which contributed to WEBC's decision in 1955 to leave the NBC network.

=== Changes in ownership ===
WEBC's first ownership change came in 1958 when Bridges sold the station to George Clinton of Clarkesburg, West Virginia for $250,000. At the time of the purchase, Clinton also owned WTMA and WTMA-FM in Charleston.

WEBC began carrying ABC Contemporary Radio Network newscasts in 1964.

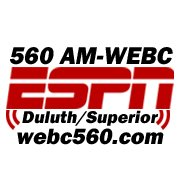
Logo as an ESPN Radio affiliate

WEBC was a top-rated station until the mid-1970s, when FM began to attract more listeners. WEBC briefly switched to country music and then tried an oldies format. Talk programming was added to the lineup by the late-1980s and took over the entire schedule by 1990.

=== Sports Radio and Classic Rock ===
The format was then changed to All-Sports in 2003 after a sale to Clear Channel Communications. To supply programming, WEBC began carrying the syndicated "FAN" radio network from KFAN in Minneapolis. After the station was sold to GapWest Broadcasting in 2007, WEBC joined ESPN Radio, with "FAN" programming soon moving to rival KQDS 1490 AM. GapWest was folded into Townsquare Media on August 13, 2010.

At 6 p.m. on September 30, 2015, WEBC dropped its sports format and began stunting with Christmas music, branded as "Ho Ho 106.5" (now simulcasting on FM translator W293CT 106.5 FM Duluth). At 1 p.m. on October 6, WEBC flipped to classic rock as "Sasquatch 106.5" after a 23-hour marathon of the 1975 song "Bigfoot" by Bro Smith.

On January 30, 2020, Townsquare Media announced that it would acquire WWAX 92.1 FM. Townsquare took over that station under a local marketing agreement (LMA) on February 1st. WEBC's classic rock format moved to WWAX as "Sasquatch 92.1". After a temporary simulcast, WWAX's former sports talk format moved to WEBC as "Fan 106.5" on February 17. That returned "Fan" network programming (now based at KFXN-FM) to the station.
