= 610 AM =

AM radio frequency

The following radio stations broadcast on AM frequency 610 kHz: The Federal Communications Commission classifies 610 AM as a regional broadcast frequency.

== In Argentina ==
- LRK 201 in Añatuya, Santiago del Estero.

== In Bolivia ==
- CP 63 in La Paz

== In Brazil ==
- ZYH249 Maceió
- ZYH786 in Luziânia
- ZYI425 in Sinop, Mato Grosso
- ZYI544 in Redenção, Pará
- ZYI-678 in Souza (Sousa), Paraíba
- ZYI-899 in Teresina
- ZYK-532 in Mogi Mirim
- ZYK-577 in Catanduva
- ZYK-726 in Piraju
- ZYK-589 in Guaratinguetá
- ZYL-268 in Nova Lima and Belo Horizonte.

== In Canada ==
Call sign	City of license	Daytime power (kW)	Nighttime power (kW)	Transmitter coordinates
CHNL	Kamloops, British Columbia	25	5	50.6472°N 120.272°W
CHTM	Thompson, Manitoba	1	0.19	55.702222°N 97.882222°W
CKTB	St. Catharines, Ontario	10	5	43.036667°N 79.166389°W

== In Chile ==
- CD-061 in Base Teniente R. Marsh Martin / Base Presidente Eduardo Frei Montalva / Villa las Estrellas

== In Colombia ==
- HJKL in Bogotá
- HJD90 in Uribia

== In Costa Rica ==
- TIRPT in San José

== In Cuba ==
- CMGA in Trinidad
- CMJA in Mayarí Arriba

== In the Dominican Republic ==
- HIRJ in Santiago de los Caballeros

== In Ecuador ==
- HCMJ1 in Quito

== In El Salvador ==
- YSS in El Divisadero, Morazán

== In Guatemala ==
- TGGA in Senorial, Mixco

== In Haiti ==
- 4VJS in Delmas, Ouest, Port-au-Prince

== In Honduras ==
- HRLP 4 in Santa Rosa de Copán
- HRLP in Tegucigalpa

== In Paraguay ==
- ZP 30 in Filadelfia

== In Mexico ==
- XEGS-AM in Guasave, Sinaloa
- XEUF-AM in Uruapan, Michoacán
- XEUM-AM in Valladolid, Yucatán

== In Panama ==
- HOHM in Panama City

== In the United States ==
Call sign	City of license	Facility ID	Class	Daytime power (kW)	Nighttime power (kW)	Unlimited power (kW)	Transmitter coordinates
KARV	Russellville, Arkansas	19827	B	1	0.5		35.298889°N 93.1525°W
KCSR	Chadron, Nebraska	10081	D	1	0.118		42.832222°N 103.016667°W
KDAL	Duluth, Minnesota	60230	B	5	5		46.720556°N 92.176667°W
KEAR	San Francisco, California	1082	B	5	5		37.849444°N 122.295556°W
KFNZ	Kansas City, Missouri	11270	B	5	5		38.984167°N 94.628333°W
KILT	Houston, Texas	25440	B	5	5		29.917778°N 95.425833°W
KNML	Albuquerque, New Mexico	68608	B	5	5		35.032222°N 106.658889°W (daytime); 35.032778°N 106.662222°W (nighttime)
KOJM	Havre, Montana	49262	B	1	1		48.58°N 109.648333°W
KONA	Kennewick-Richland-Pasco, Washington	67668	B	5	5		46.173056°N 119.068611°W
KRTA	Medford, Oregon	19557	B	2.5	5		42.3875°N 122.769722°W
KVNU	Logan, Utah	55459	B	10	1		41.675°N 111.935°W
WAGG	Birmingham, Alabama	48717	B	5	0.61		33.494167°N 86.8725°W
WCEH	Hawkinsville, Georgia	67705	D	0.5	0.126		32.280556°N 83.443611°W
WEXS	Patillas, Puerto Rico	12819	B	0.25	1		18.01°N 66.024444°W
WFNZ	Charlotte, North Carolina	53974	B	5	1		35.300833°N 80.888333°W
WGIR	Manchester, New Hampshire	35237	B	5	1		43.015833°N 71.48°W
WIOD	Miami, Florida	14242	B	50	20		25.849444°N 80.155°W
WPLO	Grayson, Georgia	8066	D	1.5	0.225		33.953056°N 83.970833°W
WRUS	Russellville, Kentucky	73971	D	1.8	0.059		36.844444°N 86.9225°W
WSNG	Torrington, Connecticut	13716	B	1	0.5		41.757778°N 73.051667°W
WTEL	Philadelphia, Pennsylvania	28626	B			5	39.865278°N 75.109444°W
WTVN	Columbus, Ohio	11269	B	5	5		39.876111°N 82.980278°W
WVTJ	Pensacola, Florida	9319	D	0.5	0.157		30.4525°N 87.240556°W
WXVA	Winchester, Virginia	4668	B	0.38	0.5		39.123889°N 78.212222°W (daytime); 39.198056°N 78.220278°W (nighttime)

== In Uruguay ==
- CX4 in Montevideo

== In Venezuela ==
- YVSE in Barquisimeto

== In Vietnam ==
- VOH AM 610, Voice of Ho Chi Minh City
