= Marty Essen =

Marty Essen is an American naturalist, author, photographer, and professional speaker. He has written nine books, Cool Creatures, Hot Planet: Exploring the Seven Continents, Endangered Edens: Exploring the Arctic National Wildlife Refuge, Costa Rica, the Everglades, and Puerto Rico, Time Is Irreverent, Time Is Irreverent 2: Jesus Christ, Not Again! Time Is Irreverent 3: Gone for 16 Seconds, Hits, Heathens, and Hippos: Stories from an Agent, Activist, and Adventurer, Doctor Refurb, The Silver Squad: Rebels With Wrinkles, and The Sliver Squad Rides Again.

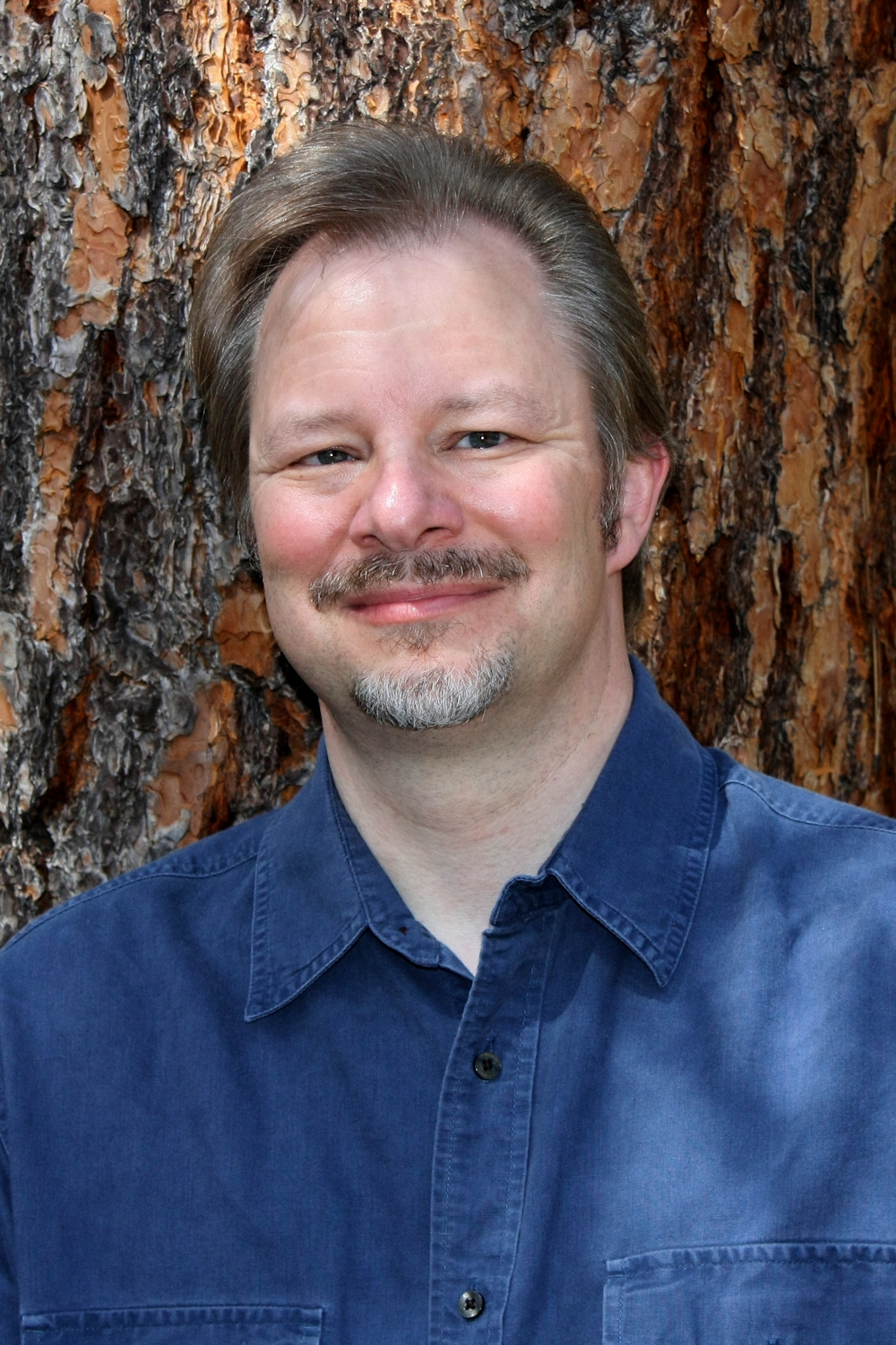
Marty Essen in Montana

.

== Early life ==
Essen was born in Duluth, Minnesota, United States. He attended Duluth East High School and University of Minnesota Duluth.

== Career ==
Essen worked as a radio announcer at WEBC-AM and KQDS-FM. In 1982, he moved to Minneapolis, Minnesota, where he ran two music talent management agencies, National Talent Associates and Twin City Talent. In 1996, Essen moved to Montana to found Essen Communications Corporation, a local telephone company, and later became an author and a college speaker.

His first book, Cool Creatures, Hot Planet, became a Minneapolis Star-Tribune Top-10 Green Book. He performs a live college show, Around the World in 90 Minutes, based on Cool Creatures, Hot Planet. One adventure, documented in both his first book and his live show, is surviving a hippo attack in Zimbabwe.

Essen's nature photography is featured prominently in his books and live show. His outdoor photographs are also in Deb Essen's book, Easy Weaving with Supplemental Warps: Overshot, Velvet, Shibori, and More. Magazines publishing his photos include Reptiles Magazine and Handwoven Magazine.

Essen's three nonfiction books advocate for protecting endangered species and the environment, and his six fiction books are comedies that advocate for the protection of human rights and the environment.

== Personal life ==
Essen resides in Montana and is married to weaving designer and author Deb Essen.

== Book awards ==
- 2006 Foreword Reviews' INDIEFAB Book of the Year Award Winner (Bronze)
- 2007 Benjamin Franklin Award for Travel/Essay
- 2007 IPPY Bronze Medal for Travel/Essay
- 2009 Green Book Festival Award for Animals
- 2016 Nautilus Award for Animals & Nature (Silver)
- 2016 Nautilus Award for Middle Grades Non-Fiction (Silver)
- 2016 Readers' Favorite Gold Medal for Non-Fiction Environment
- 2024 Indies Today Award for Best Humor Book
- 2025 IPPY Gold Medal for Humor
- 2025 National Indie Excellence Award for Best Romantic Comedy
- 2025 Readers' Favorite Gold Medal Fiction - Humor/Comedy
- 22nd Annual Best Book Awards-Humor/Comedy/Satire
- 2025 Best Indie Book Award (BIBA)–Humor Satire
- 2025 IAN Book of the Year Award-Humor/Comedy/Satire

== Books ==
- Cool Creatures, Hot Planet: Exploring the Seven Continents
- Endangered Edens: Exploring the Arctic National Wildlife Refuge, Costa Rica, the Everglades, and Puerto Rico
- Time Is Irreverent
- Time Is Irreverent 2: Jesus Christ, Not Again!
- Time Is Irreverent 3: Gone for 16 Seconds
- Hits, Heathens, and Hippos: Stories from an Agent, Activist, and Adventurer
- Doctor Refurb
- The Silver Squad: Rebels With Wrinkles
- The Silver Squad Rides Again

== Live Shows ==
Essen has been touring the United States, performing Around the World in 90 Minutes, at hundreds of colleges since 2007.
