= WBVR =

WBVR may refer to:

- WBVR (AM), a radio station (1340 AM) licensed to Bowling Green, Kentucky, United States
- WBVR-FM, a radio station (94.3 FM) licensed to Horse Cave, Kentucky
- WRUS, a radio station (610 AM) licensed to Russellville, Kentucky, which held the call sign WBVR from September to October 1994
- WUBT, a radio station (101.1 FM) licensed to Russellville, Kentucky, which held the call sign WBVR from 1984 to 1994
