= WTBX =

Coordinates: 47.373°N 93.014°W

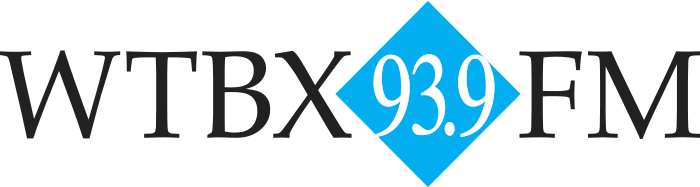
- Hibbing, Minnesota; United States
- Broadcast area: Iron Range
- Frequency: 93.9 MHz
- RDS: PI: 8705; PS/RT: Title BY ARTIST On WTBX-FM 93.9
- Branding: 93.9 WTBX

Programming
- Format: Hot adult contemporary
- Affiliations: Premiere Networks; United Stations Radio Networks; Westwood One

Ownership
- Owner: Midwest Communications; (Midwest Communications, Inc.)
- Sister stations: KDAH; KQDX; WDKE; WEVE-FM; WMFG; WUSZ

History
- First air date: 1981 (as WKKQ-FM)
- Former call signs: WKKQ-FM (1981–1983)
- Call sign meaning: "The Best Mix"

Technical information
- Licensing authority: FCC
- Facility ID: 73172
- Class: C1
- ERP: 100,000 watts
- HAAT: 162 meters (531 ft)

Links
- Public license information: Public file; LMS
- Webcast: Listen live
- Website: www.wtbx.com

WTBX (93.9 FM) is a U.S. radio station in Hibbing, Minnesota, serving the Iron Range region. The station is owned by Midwest Communications and airs a hybrid format of hot adult contemporary and modern adult contemporary.

WTBX broadcasts from a 486-foot (148 m) tower located southwest of downtown Hibbing on Town Line Road using a twelve-bay FM antenna combined with sister station WUSZ. WTBX is not licensed by the FCC to broadcast in digital HD Radio.

== History ==
WTBX began as WKKQ-FM, the FM counterpart to WKKQ in the Hibbing area. FCC application records show that the construction permit for the 93.9 MHz facility was accepted on June 6, 1980, and granted on October 16, 1980. The station's license-to-cover application was accepted on January 23, 1981, and granted on June 30, 1981. FCCInfo's call-sign history lists the station as WKKQ-FM from January 23, 1981, until the WTBX call sign was assigned on June 20, 1983.

By late 1984, WTBX was being promoted as "The Star Station" at "94 FM" and was paired with WKKQ 1060 AM under the slogan "The Best Of Both Worlds!" A December 17, 1984, WKKQ/WTBX verification letter carried the WKKQ/WTBX letterhead and was signed by station manager Jerry J. Collins.

In 1985, WKKQ Inc., owned by Jerry J. Collins and Catherine Collins, agreed to sell WKKQ(AM) and WTBX(FM) to Midwest Communications Inc. for $1.1 million. At the time of the sale, Broadcasting listed WTBX as operating on 93.9 MHz with 100 kW and an antenna height of 548 feet above average terrain. FCCInfo records show that the transfer of control was granted on January 16, 1986.

During the 1980s, WTBX had a FM translator on W249AM 97.7 MHz in Duluth, Minnesota. The translator was owned by Jayen Communications in Duluth and went off the air when the company had sold the tower and broadcast equipment in the late '90s. Today a new translator W249CX operates on 97.7 which relays WQRM and is operated by VCY America.

In 1996, WKKQ and WTBX became part of a larger transaction between Midwest Communications and Central States Network LP. Broadcasting & Cable reported that Midwest Communications acquired WROE, WNCY-FM and WNFL in Wisconsin from Central States Network for $9.5 million plus a tax-free exchange of WKKQ(AM) and WTBX(FM). The same listing identified WTBX's format as CHR. In 1997, Thomas L. Bookey Family LP acquired the remaining 70 percent of the limited-partnership interests in WKKQ and WTBX; Broadcasting & Cable again listed WTBX as a CHR station.

By 2000, Thomas L. Bookey's Midwest Radio Network LLC was described as the owner of WNMT(AM) and WTBX(FM) in Hibbing. That year, Midwest Radio Network agreed to buy WMFG(AM), WMFG-FM and KMFG(FM), expanding its Hibbing-area station group.

In 2004, Heartland Communications Group LLC, headed by Thomas L. Bookey, sold WTBX, WNMT, WMFG, WMFG-FM, KMFG and WUSZ to Midwest Communications Inc. for $5.8 million. In that transaction listing, Broadcasting & Cable identified WTBX's format as hot adult contemporary.

In 2008, the station began leaning adult top 40 during the evening hours with the addition of tracks topping contemporary hit radio charts, similar to KBMX in Duluth. The station has since shifted to a hot AC-leaning contemporary hit radio format in order to fill the hot AC void in the Hibbing market. Even with the musical shifts, the station continues to have a heavy emphasis on new hit music, and continues to air CHR slated shows, such as American Top 40 and Open House Party.

In 2023, Midwest Communications filed an FCC transfer-of-control application for WTBX and other stations, transferring control from Duey E. Wright to Mary K. Ross, Michael Wright, Jeffrey Wright, Peter Tanz and Paul Rahmlow. FCCInfo lists that transfer as granted on June 9, 2023.

== Sister stations ==
Midwest Communications also owns WUSZ, WMFG, KQDX, WDKE, WEVE and KDAH on the Iron Range. All seven stations, along with the former KMFG, were sold to Midwest for $5.4 million. All seven stations share the same studio location on W. 37th Street in Hibbing.
