= WEVE-FM =

- Eveleth, Minnesota; United States
- Broadcast area: Iron Range
- Frequency: 97.9 MHz
- RDS: PI: 615E; PS: Title BY Artist On WEVE-FM
- Branding: 97-9 WEVE

Programming
- Format: Adult contemporary
- Affiliations: Fox News Radio

Ownership
- Owner: Midwest Communications; (Midwest Communications, Inc.)
- Sister stations: KDAH; KQDX; WDKE; WMFG; WTBX; WUSZ

History
- First air date: June 26, 1978
- Call sign meaning: Eveleth

Technical information
- Licensing authority: FCC
- Facility ID: 29194
- Class: C1
- ERP: 100,000 watts
- HAAT: 158 meters (518 ft)
- Transmitter coordinates: 47°35′52.7″N 92°13′26.6″W
- Translator: 92.1 W221AU (Virginia)

Links
- Public license information: Public file; LMS
- Website: 979weve.com

WEVE-FM (97.9 MHz) is a radio station in Eveleth, Minnesota. The station is programmed with an adult contemporary format targeted towards the 25-54 age group. Established in 1978, WEVE-FM is owned by Midwest Communications.

On August 24, 2016, Midwest Communications announced that it was purchasing WEVE-FM from Red Rock Radio in a deal that included sister stations KQDS-FM in Duluth, WXXZ in Grand Marais, KAOD in Babbitt, and KGPZ in Coleraine, as well as translators W221AU, W252AN, and W288AI; the sale was completed on December 31, 2016, at a purchase price of $5.625 million.

== History ==
WEVE-FM was operating by 1979 under Iron Range Broadcasting, Inc., when the Federal Communications Commission granted Iron Range a construction permit for K288BN, a new 105.5 MHz translator at Orr, Minnesota, to rebroadcast WEVE-FM in Eveleth. Early FM listings placed the station at 100.1 MHz in Eveleth.

The station later moved to the present 97.9 MHz allocation. A Federal Register rulemaking changed the Eveleth allotment from Channel 261A to Channel 250, corresponding to the move from 100.1 MHz to 97.9 MHz. In April 1985, Broadcasting reported that WEVE-FM, then listed at 97.9 MHz, had been granted an application to change transmitter location, increase effective radiated power to 71,000 watts, and operate with an antenna height above average terrain of 527.75 feet.

A Minnesota broadcasting directory listed WEVE-FM as an adult contemporary station affiliated with ABC, operating 24 hours a day with 71,000 watts and a 550-foot antenna height. The same listing identified Iron Range Broadcasting as the owner, with Lewis Latto as president, Jerry Sylvester as vice president, Susan Latto as secretary, and Lewis Latto as treasurer.

In 2007, Iron Range Broadcasting applied for another minor change to WEVE-FM's licensed facilities. The resulting license-to-cover was granted in 2008; FCCInfo lists the station as a Class C1 facility operating with 100,000 watts effective radiated power at 158 meters HAAT, using a directional antenna.

Longtime owner Lew Latto remained associated with WEVE-FM for decades. The Pavek Museum notes that after selling WAKX and KXTP in 1994, Latto still owned WEVE-FM, KRBT and KGPZ. Latto died on August 24, 2011; his obituary stated that he continued to own and operate WEVE-FM, KRBT-AM and KGPZ-FM at the time of his death. After Latto's death, the FCC accepted an application for involuntary transfer of control of WEVE-FM from Iron Range Broadcasting to the Estate of Lewis M. Latto Jr.

Later in 2011, the FCC accepted an application to assign WEVE-FM from Iron Range Broadcasting, Inc., to Red Rock Radio Corp. Radio Business Report reported the KRBT-AM/WEVE-FM transaction at $1,036,512, with $900,985.44 allocated to WEVE-FM and $134,616.56 allocated to KRBT.

Red Rock later sold WEVE-FM as part of a group transaction with Midwest Communications. Radio Online reported in January 2017 that the sale of KQDS, WEVE, KGPZ, WXXZ, KAOD and translators W252AN, W288AI and W221AU from Red Rock Radio Corp. to Midwest Communications had closed. Midwest Communications currently identifies the station as 97.9 WEVE, an adult contemporary station branded with the slogan "Today's Hits and All of Your Favorites".

== Translators ==
WEVE's primary station coverage is augmented by two translators:

Broadcast translator for WEVE-FM
| Call sign | Frequency | City of license | FID | ERP (W) | Class | FCC info |
|---|---|---|---|---|---|---|
| W221AU | 92.1 FM | Virginia, Minnesota | 29193 | 7 | D | LMS |
