= KDAH =

Coordinates: 47°22′30.8″N 93°0′56.7″W

Simulcasting KDAL Duluth
- Nashwauk, Minnesota; United States
- Broadcast area: Hibbing, Minnesota; Iron Range
- Frequency: 650 kHz
- Branding: Northland News Radio

Programming
- Format: News/talk
- Affiliations: NBC News Radio; Compass Media Networks; Premiere Networks; Minnesota News Network; Minnesota Timberwolves; Minnesota Twins; Minnesota Wild; KBJR-TV (local news and weather)

Ownership
- Owner: Midwest Communications; (Midwest Communications, Inc.)
- Sister stations: KQDX; WDKE; WEVE-FM; WMFG; WTBX; WUSZ

History
- First air date: June 1, 1975 (as WKKQ at 1060)
- Former call signs: WKKQ (1975–1998); WNMT (1998–2025)
- Former frequencies: 1060 kHz (1975–1985)

Technical information
- Licensing authority: FCC
- Facility ID: 73173
- Class: B
- Power: 10,000 watts day; 1,000 watts night

Links
- Public license information: Public file; LMS
- Webcast: Listen live
- Website: northlandnewsradio.com

KDAH (650 AM) is a talk radio station in Nashwauk, Minnesota. KDAH is owned by Midwest Communications. Midwest owns 5 radio stations on the Iron Range; KDAH, KQDX, WMFG, WTBX, and WUSZ. All 5 stations share the same studio location on W. 37th Street in Hibbing.

KDAH broadcasts a typical AM station pattern during the day which gives it good coverage over most of Northeastern Minnesota. However at nighttime, the station broadcasts a directional pattern from five towers which makes it difficult to receive south of the immediate Iron Range. This is done to protect signals to the south broadcasting on the same frequency; particularly clear-channel station WSM in Nashville, Tennessee.

== History ==
WKKQ signed on the air on June 1, 1975, at 1060 AM with a clear channel daytime-only signal. The station was variously known as "The Super Q" and "Clear Channel Country". The first song played was John Denver's "Thank God I'm a Country Boy". The station signed off at sunset with a special arrangement of "Happy Trails" ending with "Happy trails to you from WKKQ". WKKQ was affiliated with the United Press International Radio Network and provided strong local news and community calendars to compete with Hibbing's pioneer station WMFG.

The station moved to 650 AM in 1985 and was allowed to broadcast on reduced power from sunset to sunrise. At one point in time, the station also broadcast in AM stereo. The move to 650 kHz coincided with a switch to ABC Radio and WKKQ took Paul Harvey from WMFG. In early 1998, the call letters were changed to WNMT, followed by a format change to talk in April 1998.

On October 1, 2025, WNMT began simulcasting Duluth sister station KDAL, branded as "Northland News Radio" under new KDAH call letters. The change replaced WNMT's entirely-syndicated programming with KDAL's local and regional daytime programming.

Starting May 23, 2026, KDAH, as a result of the closure of CBS News Radio became an NBC News Radio affiliate.
