= Victor, Montana =

- Census-designated place
- Location of Victor, Montana
- Coordinates: 46°24′58″N 114°8′57″W
- Country: United States
- State: Montana
- County: Ravalli

Area
  - Total: 0.45 sq mi (1.16 km^{2})
  - Land: 0.45 sq mi (1.16 km^{2})
  - Water: 0 sq mi (0.00 km^{2})
- Elevation: 3,416 ft (1,041 m)

Population (2020)
  - Total: 789
  - Density: 1,765.7/sq mi (681.73/km^{2})
- Time zone: UTC-7 (Mountain (MST))
  - Summer (DST): UTC-6 (MDT)
- ZIP code: 59875
- Area code: 406
- FIPS code: 30-76900
- GNIS feature ID: 2409511

Victor is a census-designated place (CDP) in Ravalli County, Montana, United States. The population was 789 at the 2020 Census, compared to 745 at the 2010 census.

== History ==
Victor is named for Chief Victor of the Bitterroot Salish, whose proper name was Xweɫxƛ̣ ̓cín (Many Horses). Chief Victor met Lewis and Clark when he was 15 years old in September 1805 at Ross' Hole and later he would refuse to cede the Bitterroot Valley to the United States' Washington Territory. After Chief Victor's death in 1870, the Salish were forced to move to the Flathead Reservation.

The townsite was platted in 1881. Repeal of the Sherman Silver Purchase Act in 1893 hit Victor hard, forcing many of the local mines to close. The economy rebounded in the late 1890s with the growth of the timber industry and agricultural enterprises.

== Geography ==
Victor is in southwestern Montana, along the Bitterroot River between the Bitterroot Range and Sapphire Mountains.

According to the United States Census Bureau, the CDP has a total area of 0.46 square miles (1.2 km^{2}), all land.

== Demographics ==
Historical population
Census	Pop.	Note	%±
2020	789		—
U.S. Decennial Census

As of the census of 2000, there were 859 people, 351 households, and 230 families residing in the CDP. The population density was 537.6 inhabitants per square mile (207.6/km^{2}). There were 375 housing units at an average density of 234.7 per square mile (90.6/km^{2}). The racial makeup of the CDP was 96.16% White, 0.12% African American, 1.51% Native American, 0.12% Pacific Islander, 0.70% from other races, and 1.40% from two or more races. Hispanic or Latino of any race were 2.56% of the population.

There were 351 households, out of which 34.5% had children under the age of 18 living with them, 50.1% were married couples living together, 10.0% had a female householder with no husband present, and 34.2% were non-families. 27.1% of all households were made up of individuals, and 9.1% had someone living alone who was 65 years of age or older. The average household size was 2.45 and the average family size was 2.97.

In the CDP, the population was spread out, with 29.2% under the age of 18, 7.2% from 18 to 24, 27.5% from 25 to 44, 21.0% from 45 to 64, and 15.1% who were 65 years of age or older. The median age was 35 years. For every 100 females, there were 90.9 males. For every 100 females age 18 and over, there were 90.6 males.

The median income for a household in the CDP was $38,618, and the median income for a family was $42,986. Males had a median income of $29,917 versus $17,250 for females. The per capita income for the CDP was $17,599. About 6.6% of families and 7.7% of the population were below the poverty line, including 14.0% of those under age 18 and none of those age 65 or over.

== Education ==
Victor Public Schools educates students from kindergarten through 12th grade. In the 2021-2022 school year, a total of 261 students were enrolled in the district. Victor High School's team name is the Pirates.

== Media ==
The FM radio station KXEH is licensed in Victor. It plays a religious format.

== Infrastructure ==
Victor is located along U.S. Route 93. The nearest airport is Missoula Montana Airport 39 miles (63 km) north.

== Notable people ==
- Hoyt Axton, singer, songwriter, actor
- Marty Essen, ten-time award-winning author, photographer, professional speaker
- Tom Hewitt, actor

== See also ==
- List of census-designated places in Montana
