= KLDJ =

Coordinates: 46.787°N 92.122°W

- Duluth, Minnesota; United States
- Broadcast area: Duluth-Superior
- Frequency: 101.7 MHz
- Branding: Kool 101.7

Programming
- Format: Classic hits
- Affiliations: Compass Media Networks; Premiere Networks; Westwood One

Ownership
- Owner: Townsquare Media; (Townsquare License, LLC)
- Sister stations: KBMX, KKCB, WEBC, WWPE-FM

History
- First air date: 1991 (as KVNW)
- Former call signs: KVNW (1991–1993); KLXK (1993–1996)
- Call sign meaning: "Kool DJ"

Technical information
- Licensing authority: FCC
- Facility ID: 53999
- Class: C2
- ERP: 18,500 watts
- HAAT: 251 m (823 ft)

Links
- Public license information: Public file; LMS
- Webcast: Listen Live
- Website: kool1017.com

KLDJ (101.7 FM, "Kool 101.7") is a radio station in Duluth, Minnesota, owned by Townsquare Media, airing a classic hits music format.

== History ==
=== Construction permit and KLXK launch ===
KLDJ originated as a new commercial FM construction permit for 101.7 MHz in Duluth. FCC application records list the original construction permit as BPH-19890425MA, granted on February 8, 1991, and FCCInfo's call sign history shows that the facility received the call letters KVNW on April 5, 1991.

The facility remained a construction permit into the early 1990s. In June 1993, The M Street Journal listed "KVNW(CP)-101.7" in Duluth as a new station planned for an oldies format that September. The call letters changed from KVNW to KLXK on November 15, 1993. In April 1994, The M Street Journal reported KLXK as a new 101.7 MHz station carrying the JSN oldies format. The FCC granted the station's initial license to cover on October 12, 1994.

=== Northland Broadcasting and Kool 101.7 ===
The station entered the Northland Broadcasting/WEBC group in the mid-1990s. FCC records show an assignment of authorization for KLDJ granted on September 5, 1995. A history of WEBC's operations published by NorthPine states that, in late 1995, duopoly reached WEBC when KLXK was added to the Northland Broadcasting family. The station had been broadcasting a satellite-delivered 1960s/1970s oldies service, and management kept the format while using the Scott Studios automation system to originate the programming locally from hard drive.

The station adopted the KLDJ call sign on March 29, 1996. FMedia! listed the change in 1996 as "KLDJ (KLXK), 'Kool 101.7'", confirming the station's long-running oldies/classic hits identity under the Kool 101.7 brand. FCC records show a minor modification granted in 1996, followed by a license to cover granted on September 24, 1996.

=== Brill, Regent, Clear Channel, GapWest and Townsquare ===
Northland Broadcasting was part of Brill Media's Duluth holdings during the 1990s. In January 2002, the FCC accepted for filing a transfer-of-control application for KLDJ, Facility ID 53999, from Alan R. Brill to Broadcasting, Inc.; FCCInfo lists that transfer as granted on January 11, 2002.

In 2002, Regent Communications agreed to acquire 12 stations from Brill Media Company for $62 million, including stations in Duluth. Regent's later SEC filing stated that the company completed the Brill acquisition on February 25, 2003, and that the Duluth stations acquired in the transaction were KKCB-FM, KLDJ-FM, KBMX-FM and WEBC-AM.

Regent did not keep the Duluth cluster for long. On January 28, 2004, Regent completed an exchange agreement with Clear Channel Broadcasting in which Regent traded KKCB-FM, KLDJ-FM, KBMX-FM and WEBC-AM, plus $2.7 million in cash, for five Clear Channel stations in Evansville, Indiana. The same filing states that Clear Channel had begun providing programming and other services to the Duluth stations on March 1, 2003, before the exchange closed.

By 2009, KLDJ was identified as a GapWest Broadcasting station, still using the Kool 101.7 branding. Townsquare Media completed its acquisition of GAP Radio Broadcasting on August 13, 2010, adding 111 radio stations and associated digital assets in 23 markets. KLDJ has remained part of Townsquare Media's Duluth cluster, and Townsquare lists the station as "KOOL 101.7 - KLDJ 101.7-FM The Northland's Favorite Hits".

=== Studios and technical facilities ===
KLDJ was added to the WEBC group while the cluster was based in Duluth's East Hillside neighborhood. In 1999, the group moved to a former Color Tile building on Central Entrance, where it later added KBMX. In November 2019, Townsquare's Duluth stations moved from Central Entrance to street-level studios in the Holiday Center on Superior Street in downtown Duluth. Townsquare currently lists its Duluth cluster, including KLDJ, at 207 W. Superior Street, Suite 130, Duluth, Minnesota.

KLDJ is licensed as a Class C2 commercial FM station on 101.7 MHz in Duluth. FCCInfo lists the station with an effective radiated power of 18.5 kW and an antenna height above average terrain of 249 meters. Its transmitter is on the WDIO-TV tower at 10 Observation Road in Duluth. FCCInfo lists Townsquare License, LLC as the licensee and shows the station's current license expiring on April 1, 2029.

== Previous logo ==
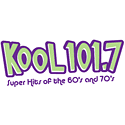
