= Tracee Carrasco =

- Born: September 2, 1981 (age 45); Honolulu, Hawaii, United States
- Education: B.A. Azusa Pacific University
- Occupation: Television Journalist
- Years active: 2007–present

Tracee Carrasco (born September 2, 1981) is an American TV news reporter, formerly for Fox Business Network. Carrasco also previously reported for CBS 2 News, WCBS-TV in New York City.

== Biography ==
Carrasco was born in Honolulu, Hawaii, the daughter of Sheril (née Carrasco) and Gilbert Tolentino. She was raised in Hawaii and Southern California. She is of Filipino descent. Carrasco graduated from Azusa Pacific University in Southern California with a degree in Communication Studies where she interned at KABC-TV (Channel 7) News, Los Angeles. Other internships included KCBS-TV (Channel 2) / KCAL-TV (Channel 9) News, Los Angeles (Entertainment Dept. 2004). Later, she was a field reporter as well as fill-in anchor in Torrance, California CitiCable 3.

In February 2010, she accepted a position as the Weekend Anchor / Weekday Reporter for the Fox affiliate KQDS serving the upper Minnesota, Wisconsin and Michigan regions. Her reporting for KQDS earned two Upper Midwest Emmy nominations in the categories Public / Current / Community Affairs ("Honest Northland Series") and Historic / Cultural / Nostalgic (“A Tribute to Ben Larson: Missionary Killed in Haiti’s Earthquake”). In August 2011, she accepted a position as a fill-in anchor and reporter for the ABC affiliate in Nashville, Tennessee, WKRN News 2. In June 2013, she accepted a position as general assignment reporter for WCBS-TV and WLNY 10/55 in New York. In May 2017, she joined the Fox Business Network as a general assignment reporter.

Carrasco has also appeared with CNN's Nancy Grace on HLN.

== Publications ==
Carrasco has had pieces published in various newspapers and magazines such as the Duluth News Tribune, San Gabriel Valley Tribune, and Equities Magazine.

== See also ==
- New Yorkers in journalism
