= WSCN =

Minnesota Public Radio station in Cloquet, Minnesota

Coordinates: 46.789°N 92.114°W

- Cloquet, Minnesota; United States
- Broadcast area: Duluth-Superior
- Frequency: 100.5 MHz (HD Radio)

Programming
- Format: Public; News/Talk
- Subchannels: HD2: The Current
- Affiliations: Minnesota Public Radio, NPR, American Public Media

Ownership
- Owner: Minnesota Public Radio
- Sister stations: KZIO, WSCD-FM

History
- First air date: November 17, 1975; 50 years ago
- Former call signs: WKLK-FM (1975–1988)
- Former frequencies: 100.9 MHz (1975–1988)

Technical information
- Licensing authority: FCC
- Facility ID: 42975
- Class: C1
- ERP: 97,000 watts
- HAAT: 267 meters (876 ft)
- Translator: HD2: 90.9 W215CG (Duluth)

Links
- Public license information: Public file; LMS
- Webcast: Stream
- Website: Minnesota Public Radio News

WSCN (100.5 FM) is a radio station licensed to Cloquet, Minnesota, serving the Duluth-Superior area. The station is owned by Minnesota Public Radio (MPR), and airs MPR's "News and Information" network, originating from the Twin Cities. The station has inserts at least once an hour for local underwriting and weather. MPR also maintains an office and studio in downtown Duluth.

WSCN broadcasts in HD.

== History ==
WSCN signed on as WKLK-FM at 100.9 MHz on November 17, 1975. It was owned with WKLK (1230 AM) and almost entirely simulcast it. The station was sold to Minnesota Public Radio in 1988 for $200,000 and upgraded its signal from 3,000 watts to 100,000 watts, and relocating to 100.5.

On January 20, 2016, MPR announced that WSCD-FM translator 90.9 W215CG and WSCN-HD2 would air its adult album alternative network The Current beginning February 1, 2016. Programming originates from MPR's studios in St. Paul, but a local program featuring Duluth music is produced for the network.
