= WDKE (FM) =

Simulcast of KDKE, Superior, Wisconsin
- Coleraine, Minnesota; United States
- Broadcast area: Iron Range
- Frequency: 96.1 MHz
- RDS: PI: 5D9C; PS/RT: Title - Artist
- Branding: 96.1 Duke FM

Programming
- Format: Classic country

Ownership
- Owner: Duey E. Wright; (Midwest Communications, Inc.)
- Sister stations: KDAH; KQDX; WEVE-FM; WMFG; WTBX; WUSZ

History
- First air date: July 1, 1995 (as KGPZ)
- Former call signs: KGPZ (1995–2017)
- Call sign meaning: Format and station named in tribute to Midwest Communications founder Duey "Duke" Wright

Technical information
- Licensing authority: FCC
- Facility ID: 36688
- Class: C1
- ERP: 100,000 watts
- HAAT: 176 meters (577 ft)
- Transmitter coordinates: 47°19′30.7″N 93°16′18.7″W
- Translator: 98.3 W252AN (Hibbing)

Links
- Public license information: Public file; LMS
- Website: dukecountry.fm

WDKE (96.1 FM; "Duke FM") is a radio station broadcasting a classic country format. Licensed to Coleraine, Minnesota, United States, the station serves the Iron Range area. Established in 1995 as KGPZ, the station is owned by Midwest Communications.

In April 2012, KGPZ changed to "Z96 North Country", adding more new country hits and no longer broadcasting Cumulus Media Networks' "Real Country" network. The station now directly competed with WUSZ (99.9 FM).

On January 1, 2017, as a result of a sale between Red Rock Radio and Midwest Communications (Midwest acquired KGPZ in the sale), KGPZ adjusted its format to classic country, as "96.1 Duke FM"; the sale essentially turned the station from a rival to WUSZ into a flanker for it. On January 30, 2017, KGPZ changed its call letters to WDKE, to go with the "Duke FM" branding. WDKE was locally programmed until early 2025, when it shifted to a simulcast of KDKE in Superior, Wisconsin.
