= WSCD-FM =

Radio station in Duluth, Minnesota

- Duluth, Minnesota; United States
- Broadcast area: Duluth-Superior
- Frequency: 92.9 MHz (HD Radio)
- Branding: Your Classical MPR

Programming
- Format: Public radio and classical
- Affiliations: Minnesota Public Radio, NPR, APM

Ownership
- Owner: Minnesota Public Radio; (Minnesota Public Radio)

History
- First air date: December 11, 1979

Technical information
- Licensing authority: FCC
- Facility ID: 42940
- Class: C1
- ERP: 70,000 watts
- HAAT: 185 meters (607 ft)
- Transmitter coordinates: 46°47′20″N 92°07′04″W

Links
- Public license information: Public file; LMS
- Webcast: Listen live
- Website: yourclassical.org/mpr

WSCD-FM (92.9 FM) is a radio station licensed to Duluth, Minnesota, serving the Duluth-Superior area. The station is owned by Minnesota Public Radio (MPR), and airs MPR's "Classical Music Network", originating from KSJN in Minneapolis/St. Paul.

WSCD broadcasts in HD Radio.

On January 20, 2016, MPR announced that WSCD translator 90.9 W215CG and WSCN-HD2 would air its adult album alternative network The Current beginning February 1, 2016. Programming will primarily originate from KCMP in Minneapolis, but local programs will also be included.

== See also ==
- Minnesota Public Radio
