= WRUS =

Coordinates: 36°50′40″N 86°55′21″W

- Russellville, Kentucky; United States
- Broadcast area: Bowling Green; Hopkinsville
- Frequency: 610 kHz
- Branding: WRUS 104.9 610

Programming
- Format: Full service

Ownership
- Owner: Logan Radio Incorporated

History
- First air date: August 28, 1953
- Former frequencies: 800 kHz (1953–1957)
- Call sign meaning: Russellville

Technical information
- Licensing authority: FCC
- Facility ID: 73971
- Class: D
- Power: 1,800 watts (day); 59 watts (night)
- Translators: W285GB (104.9 MHz, Russellville)

Links
- Public license information: Public file; LMS
- Webcast: Listen Live
- Website: www.wrusradio.com

WRUS (610 AM) is a radio station licensed to serve the community of Russellville, Kentucky. WRUS is owned by Logan Radio Inc. WRUS operates with a daytime power of 1800 watts and 59 watts at night per FCC authorization.

610 AM is a Regional broadcast frequency.

== History ==
WRUS began broadcasting on August 28, 1953. Under original ownership by South Kentucky Broadcasters, with Roth Hook as president, the station originally broadcast at 800 kilohertz for its first four years on the air. In 1957, its frequency was changed to 610 kHz where it still operates today.

The station launched WRUS-FM (101.1 MHz, now WUBT) in March 1965 to simulcast its AM signal. This simulcast lasted until 1974, when the FM begain airing its Top 40 format as WAKQ. WRUS's AM programming wouldn't become available on FM again until low-power translator W285GB was launched in the 2010s.

== FM translator ==
WRUS also broadcasts on an FM translator in order to provide improved sound and better nighttime coverage.

Broadcast translator for WRUS
Call sign	Frequency	City of license	FID	ERP (W)	HAAT	Class	FCC info
W285GB	104.9 FM	Russellville, Kentucky	201335	235	195 m (640 ft)	D	LMS

== Programming ==
The station features morning show host Chris McGinnis. Don Neagle, a member of the Kentucky Journalism Hall of Fame, continued to host the local Call-in show "Feedback" each weekday from 9a-10a until his 2022 retirement. Don began his career at WRUS on September 1, 1958. Midday host is Lucas Celsor. Afternoon host is Myla Porter.

WRUS airs a full service format with news, classic country, and oldies music throughout the day. WRUS also broadcasts many of the football and basketball games of Russellville High School and Logan County High School.
