= KQDX =

Radio station in Hibbing, Minnesota

Simulcasting KQDS-FM, Duluth
- Hibbing, Minnesota; United States
- Broadcast area: Iron Range
- Frequency: 106.3 MHz
- Branding: 95 KQDS

Programming
- Format: Classic rock
- Affiliations: United Stations Radio Networks

Ownership
- Owner: Midwest Communications; (Midwest Communications, Inc.)
- Sister stations: KDAH; WDKE; WEVE-FM; WMFG; WTBX; WUSZ

History
- First air date: 1971
- Former call signs: WMFG-FM (1971–1983); WMFG (1983–1987); WMFG-FM (1987–2025)
- Call sign meaning: similar to KQDS

Technical information
- Licensing authority: FCC
- Facility ID: 60912
- Class: C3
- ERP: 25,000 watts
- HAAT: 77 meters (253 ft)
- Transmitter coordinates: 47°24′29.8″N 92°57′4.7″W

Links
- Public license information: Public file; LMS
- Webcast: Listen live
- Website: www.95kqds.com

KQDX (106.3 MHz) is a radio station licensed to Hibbing, Minnesota. The station serves the Hibbing area as a simulcast of KQDS-FM, a classic rock station in Duluth. KQDX is owned by Midwest Communications.

KQDX is part of a Midwest cluster of stations on the Iron Range that also includes KDAH, WMFG, WTBX and WUSZ. All stations share the same studio location at 807 W. 37th Street, Hibbing.

== History ==
Plans for the station were reported in January 1968, when Hibbing Broadcasting Company, headed by Frank Befera, sought authorization for a new FM station in Hibbing operating with 600 watts on 106.3 MHz. The WMFG-FM call letters were assigned in 1968. WMFG-FM began broadcasting in 1971 under the same ownership as WMFG on 1240 AM. The Federal Communications Commission (FCC) granted its first broadcast license on July 13, 1971, authorizing an effective radiated power of 600 watts and an antenna height of 270 feet above average terrain.

By 1980, WMFG-FM was broadcasting in stereo and duplicating half of the AM station's programming. In an allotment proceeding that year, the FCC noted that WMFG-FM operated with 600 watts to avoid prohibited signal-contour overlap with commonly owned WHLB-FM in Virginia. The commission stated that its ownership rules prevented an upgrade to Class C facilities without a waiver.

In 1983, the FM station dropped its suffix and became WMFG, while its AM companion adopted the WGGR call letters. The 1984 Broadcasting/Cablecasting Yearbook listed the FM station as a full-time simulcast of WGGR, whose programming included Top 40 and progressive rock. In 1985, Hibbing Broadcasting proposed transferring control from Befera and his wife, Claire, to their daughter, station general manager Regina R. Stockman.

In June 1987, Radio & Records reported an agreement to sell WGGR and WMFG to DNS Broadcasting Inc., owned by Dennis Rice and members of his family, for $110,000. The report identified Stockman as Hibbing Broadcasting's president and described the stations' format as contemporary hit radio. On August 5, 1987, the AM station regained the WMFG call letters, and the FM station became WMFG-FM again.

In February 1993, Radio & Records reported a $255,000 agreement to sell WMFG and WMFG-FM from DNS Broadcasting to Sounds Unlimited of Red Wing Inc., owned by Alan Quarnstrom and Ross Fleischman. The publication listed the FM station's format as gold. Later that year, the FCC authorized 25,000-watt operation as a Class C3 station. A subsequent application for a 100,000-watt upgrade was dismissed in 1998 at Quarnstrom's request; WMFG-FM was then operating with 25,000 watts.

In July 2000, a $2.15 million agreement was reported for the sale of WMFG, WMFG-FM, and KMFG in Nashwauk from Al Quarnstrom and Dennis Martin to Midwest Radio Network LLC. The buyer, headed by Thomas L. Bookey, already owned WNMT and WTBX in the Hibbing market. WMFG-FM was carrying an oldies format.

By 2004, Midwest Radio Network had become Heartland Communications Group. That year, Heartland agreed to sell its Iron Range group—WMFG, WMFG-FM, WTBX, WNMT, KMFG, and WUSZ—to Midwest Communications. WMFG-FM retained its oldies format at the time of the agreement. Midwest Communications dates completion of the acquisition to June 30, 2004. During a 2005 visit, radio writer Scott Fybush documented the group's studios at 807 West 37th Street in Hibbing, where WMFG-FM shared a tower with WMFG and KMFG.

By January 1, 2017, WMFG-FM had replaced its syndicated classic hits programming with a simulcast of KQDS-FM, the classic rock station on 94.9 MHz in Duluth. The change followed Midwest Communications' acquisition of KQDS-FM from Red Rock Radio as part of a five-station purchase. WMFG-FM carried KQDS-FM's "95 KQDS" programming as Midwest divested its existing Iron Range classic rock station, KMFG.

The FCC approved an application to change WMFG-FM's call sign on February 10, 2025. The KQDX call letters became effective on February 14. The change was intended to align the station's call letters with those of KQDS-FM, which it rebroadcast.

A transmitter malfunction reduced KQDX's effective radiated power to 3,200 watts on September 22, 2025. The FCC subsequently granted special temporary authority for that operation. The station returned to its licensed 25,000 watts on March 18, 2026.
