= WDUL =

Coordinates: 46°43′28″N 92°07′11″W

- Superior, Wisconsin; United States
- Broadcast area: Duluth-Superior
- Frequency: 970 kHz
- Branding: 98X

Programming
- Language: English
- Format: Active rock
- Affiliations: Westwood One

Ownership
- Owner: Midwest Communications; (Midwest Communications, Inc.)
- Sister stations: KDAL, KDAL-FM, KDKE, KTCO, WDSM

History
- First air date: August 10, 1959 (as WQMN at 1320)
- Former call signs: WQMN (1959–1966); WAKX (1966–1982); KXTP (1982–2003); WGEE (2003–2015)
- Former frequencies: 1320 kHz (1959–1967)
- Call sign meaning: "Duluth"

Technical information
- Licensing authority: FCC
- Facility ID: 26590
- Class: D
- Power: 1,000 watts (day); 26 watts (night)
- Translator: 98.1 W251CD (Superior)

Links
- Public license information: Public file; LMS
- Webcast: Listen live
- Website: 98xrocks.com

WDUL (970 kHz) is a commercial AM radio station licensed to Superior, Wisconsin. It airs an active rock format and is owned and operated by Midwest Communications. Midwest's six Duluth-Superior radio stations share studios at 11 East Superior Street in downtown Duluth, Minnesota.

WDUL is a Class D AM station. It is powered at 1,000 watts by day, using a non-directional antenna. To avoid interference to other stations on 970 AM, at night it reduces power to 26 watts. Programming is also heard on 250-watt FM translator W251CD at 98.1 MHz in Superior. It uses the translator dial position in its moniker "98X".

== History ==
=== WQMN 1320 ===
The station signed on the air on August 10, 1959, as WQMN. It was a 1,000-watt daytime-only station transmitting on 1320 kHz. WQMN was owned by Quality Radio, Inc. in Superior, Wisconsin.

At noon on May 9, 1964, the station changed its call sign to WAKX ("WAX"), playing a Top 40 format. Lance "Tac" Hammer was the station's first program director.

=== WAKX 970 ===
WAKX moved to 970 kHz, formerly the home of WIGL in Superior, on October 26, 1967. The 1320 kHz frequency in the Duluth-Superior market is no longer in use.

Owner Lew Latto purchased the facilities of beautiful music station KPIR in September 1974, and began simulcasting the format of WAKX on both 970 AM and 98.9 FM.

=== KXTP ===
In 1982, the AM station changed its call sign to KXTP and switched to adult standards, airing the "Music of Your Life" syndicated format. WAKX-FM remained unchanged.

In 1994, Latto sold KXTP and WAKX to Ken Beuhler and Patty McNulty, the owners of WDSM and KZIO (currently KDKE). The FM station flipped from classic rock to country music and became KTCO. Later that decade, Buehler and McNulty sold their stations to Shockley Communications, which changed KXTP's format to country music and then Radio Disney network on April 2, 1998.

=== WGEE ===
It later switched to hot talk, and then to sports radio. Its call letters were WGEE. It aired ESPN Radio programming, as well as two syndicated programs, The Jim Rome Show and Loveline. It was also the local home of NASCAR races and ESPN Sunday Night Baseball.

AM 970 returned to the "Music of Your Life" adult standards format in September 2008, dropping ESPN Radio.

On March 7, 2014, WGEE changed formats from adult standards, back to sports, this time with programming from CBS Sports Radio.

=== WDUL ===
On March 16, 2015, WGEE changed its call sign to WDUL. Even though WDUL is licensed to Superior, Wisconsin, the call letters stand for Duluth, Minnesota.

On November 4, 2020, WDUL rebranded as "970 The Game". Its weekday daytime programming originated from WRNW, a sports station in Milwaukee owned by iHeartMedia.

=== Hot 98.1 ===
On April 25, 2022, WDUL changed formats from sports to CHR, branded as "Hot 98.1". WDUL aired programming from Westwood One's "Hits Now!" network, competing against Top 40 outlet KBMX. Some programs from the prior sports format were moved to sister station WDSM.

The switch to a CHR format was primarily for listeners to 98.1 FM, the station's translator outlet. This also returned the CHR format to 970 AM for the first time since then-KXTP dropped the Radio Disney affiliation in 2002.

In April 2025, WDUL shifted to hot adult contemporary, utilizing programming from Westwood One's "Hot AC" network due to the company shutting down its "Hits Now" network. The station maintained the "Hot 98.1" branding.

=== 98X ===
On March 27, 2026, a post was uploaded on the station’s Facebook page, revealing that the “X” brand and the active rock format would return to radio this time on this station.

On March 30, 2026, the post was confirmed, as WDUL dropped the hot adult contemporary and changed their format to active rock, branded as "98X", returning the “X” branding that was previously used on signals KZIO 94.1/104.3 until being sold to MPR, went silent after the sale closing, and change to AAA as “The Current” in 2017.
