= WVTJ =

Pensacola, Florida; United States
- Broadcast area: Pensacola area
- Frequency: 610 kHz

Programming
- Format: Gospel
- Affiliations: Salem Communications

Ownership
- Owner: Pensacola Radio Corporation (Wilkins Radio subsidiary)

History
- Call sign meaning: We're Victory Through Jesus

Technical information
- Licensing authority: FCC
- Facility ID: 9319
- Class: D
- Power: 500 watts day 157 watts night
- Transmitter coordinates: 30°27′0″N 87°14′26″W

Links
- Public license information: Public file; LMS
- Webcast: http://radio.securenetsystems.net/v5/WVTJ
- Website: http://www.wilkinsradio.com/our-stations/wvtj-610am-pensacola-fl/

WVTJ (610 AM) is a radio station broadcasting a Gospel format. Licensed to Pensacola, Florida, United States, the station serves the Pensacola area. The station is owned by Pensacola Radio Corporation and features programming from Salem Communications.
