= KDAL-FM =

Coordinates: 46.787°N 92.123°W

- Duluth, Minnesota; United States
- Broadcast area: Duluth-Superior
- Frequency: 95.7 MHz
- Branding: My 95.7

Programming
- Format: Hot adult contemporary
- Affiliations: Compass Media Networks

Ownership
- Owner: Midwest Communications; (Midwest Communications, Inc.)
- Sister stations: KDAL; KTCO; WDSM; WDUL; KDKE

History
- First air date: 1985; 41 years ago
- Call sign meaning: Dalton Alexander LeMasurier

Technical information
- Licensing authority: FCC
- Facility ID: 60237
- Class: C1
- ERP: 100,000 watts
- HAAT: 221 m (725 ft)

Links
- Public license information: Public file; LMS
- Webcast: Listen live
- Website: my957.com

KDAL-FM (95.7 MHz, "My 95.7") is an American radio station in Duluth, Minnesota, airing a hot adult contemporary format.

The current format consists of pop music from the 2000s to today along with some alternative rock tracks.

KDAL-FM is owned by Midwest Communications, which also owns KDKE, WDSM, WDUL, KDAL, and KTCO in Duluth. All the Duluth stations share the same studio location at 11 East Superior St. Suite 380, downtown Duluth.

== History ==
KDAL-FM previously carried an adult contemporary format under the names "96 Lite FM" and "Magic 95.7". KDAL-FM aired the syndicated Deliliah show weeknights. Upon changing its name to "The Bridge" on January 1, 2006, it aired a variation of the adult hits format that was best described as a classic hits/adult album alternative (AAA) hybrid. In 2008 the station began airing a full-fledged AAA format.

On September 13, 2010, KDAL-FM changed its format to classic rock, branded as "Rock 96" and focusing on rock music from the 1970s, 1980s, and 1990s. By the summer of 2011, "Rock 96" tweaked to a mainstream rock format playing a mix of classic rock and rock from the 1970s, 1980s, 1990s, 2000s, to current active rock music, competing between heritage classic rock 94.9 KQDS-FM and active rock 104.3/94.1 KZIO "94X".

On February 18, 2014, KDAL-FM changed its format to adult contemporary, branded as "FM 95.7". On September 21, 2015, KDAL-FM rebranded as "My 95.7". The format later evolved to hot adult contemporary in early 2026.

KDAL is now the Pop-music playing station owned by Midwest Communications after WDUL changed its format to Active Rock earlier this year.
