= WPLO =

Radio station in Grayson–Atlanta, Georgia

- Grayson, Georgia; United States
- Broadcast area: Atlanta metropolitan area
- Frequency: 610 kHz (analog)
- Branding: La Bonita 610 AM

Programming
- Language: Spanish
- Format: Spanish / Mexican Music Programming

Ownership
- Owner: Teresa Esquivel

History
- First air date: 1960?
- Former call signs: WLAW (1960s-1987); WGNN (1987–1990)
- Call sign meaning: W Schering Plough

Technical information
- Licensing authority: FCC
- Class: D
- Power: 1,500 watts daytime 225 watts nighttime
- Transmitter coordinates: 33.952972°N 83.971108°W
- Translators: W261EA (100.1 MHz, Atlanta)

Links
- Public license information: Public file; LMS
- Website: Official WPLO Website

WPLO ("La Bonita 610 AM") is an Atlanta area AM broadcasting station, licensed to Grayson, Georgia, that broadcasts Spanish language music programming. It transmits at a frequency of 610 kHz with 1,500 Watts of power during the daytime and 225 Watts during nighttime using a non-directional antenna. WPLO is a Class-D AM broadcasting station according to the Federal Communications Commission. The station has applied to the Federal Communications Commission to change its licensed city to Lawrenceville, Georgia.

== History ==
The radio station is not to be confused with the other AM broadcasting station in the Atlanta radio market which carried the WPLO call signs from 1959 until 1987. The 610 kHz station adopted the WPLO call signs in 1990 when it switched from its previous WGNN call signs. WLAW were the original call signs of this station before switching to WGNN in 1987.

The station was branded as "RadioMex 610 Atlanta" until 2009. Late in 2009, the station changed to the "La Bonita 610 AM" branding.

== AM stereo ==
WPLO is the Atlanta area's last remaining analog AM stereo radio station using the C-QUAM AM Stereo system.
