= WUSZ =

Coordinates: 47.373°N 93.014°W

- Virginia, Minnesota; United States
- Broadcast area: Iron Range
- Frequency: 99.9 MHz
- RDS: PI: 8B65; PS/RT: Title BY Artist On Radio USA
- Branding: 99.9 Radio USA

Programming
- Format: Country

Ownership
- Owner: Midwest Communications; (Midwest Communications, Inc.)
- Sister stations: KDAH; KQDX; WDKE; WEVE-FM; WMFG; WTBX

History
- First air date: June 2, 1971; 55 years ago (as WHLB-FM on 107.1 MHz)
- Former call signs: WHLB-FM (1971–1973); WIRN (1973–1979); WHLB-FM (1979–1987); WCDK-FM (1987–1993)
- Former frequencies: 107.1 MHz (1971–1988)
- Call sign meaning: "US"

Technical information
- Facility ID: 70302
- Class: C1
- ERP: 100,000 watts
- HAAT: 162 meters (531 ft)

Links
- Webcast: Listen live
- Website: www.radiousa.com

WUSZ (99.9 FM "Radio USA") is a commercial radio station licensed to Virginia, Minnesota, and serving the Iron Range region. It is owned by Midwest Communications and it airs a country radio format. The studios and offices are on West 37th Street in Hibbing. It is co-located with its Midwest Communications sister stations: KDAH, KQDX, WDKE, WEVE-FM, WMFG and WTBX.

WUSZ is a Class C1 station. It has an effective radiated power (ERP) of 100,000 watts, the maximum for most FM stations.

== History ==
Virginia Broadcasting Company filed an application on December 29, 1967, for a new FM station in Virginia, Minnesota, operating on 107.1 MHz. In June 1968, the Federal Communications Commission (FCC) designated the application for a hearing to examine whether common ownership with a proposed FM station in Hibbing would restrict the stations' future expansion under its rules against overlapping commonly owned FM signals. The FCC granted the construction permit on May 12, 1969, and assigned the WHLB-FM call letters on July 29.

WHLB-FM began broadcasting on June 2, 1971, as the FM companion to Virginia Broadcasting's WHLB on 1400 AM. It operated with an effective radiated power of 3,000 watts and an antenna approximately 105 feet (32 m) above average terrain. Its studios and transmitter were at Sixth Avenue West and Seventeenth Street South in Virginia; the FCC granted its broadcast license on June 28, 1971. Its early music programming was adult contemporary. The station became WIRN on April 12, 1973. The 1977 Broadcasting Yearbook listed WIRN as duplicating WHLB's programming in full. The WHLB-FM call sign was restored on April 23, 1979.

Frank Befera's son, Frank R. Befera, took over the WHLB stations in 1985. In 1987, the FCC authorized WHLB-FM to move from 107.1 to 99.9 MHz, relocate its transmitter, and increase its effective radiated power to 100,000 watts as a Class C1 station. The call letters changed to WCDK-FM on November 15, 1987. On April 8, 1988, the station relaunched on 99.9 MHz with a country format branded "Alive and Kickin' K100". Its initial staff included program director and afternoon host Tom Baldrica, morning announcer J. D. Richards, and midday announcer Mary Grillo.

In 1990, the original station building in Virginia was demolished and replaced by a double-wide trailer that housed both WHLB and the FM station. WCDK-FM became WUSZ on April 6, 1993. By that April, it used the "USA Radio" name and promoted its programming on both 99.9 MHz and "Metro 107.1", the separately licensed translator W296AV in Arnold, near Duluth. Baldrica left the station for a promotion position with BNA Records in 1993. In August 1994, The M Street Journal reported that the new KUSZ on 107.7 MHz in Proctor was simulcasting WUSZ under a local marketing agreement.

By 1995, Frank and Mary Befera were handling programming for the FM operation and co-hosting a four-hour weekday morning show. Mary, who used her maiden name Grillo on the air, was also music director. A Billboard profile described the WUSZ–KUSZ format as a mixture of contemporary country, American rock, and album tracks, with both stations identified as "USA Radio". KUSZ adopted a rock format branded "Z-Rock" in April 1997. WUSZ program director Tom Martinez received Gavin's small-market country operations manager/program director award in 1999.

WUSZ moved its studios from Virginia to Hibbing in 2000; Befera subsequently sold the AM station separately to a religious broadcaster. In October 2000, Country Airplay Monitor reported that WUSZ had begun operating under a local marketing agreement with Chicago-based Midwest Radio. Martinez departed, Scott Hanson became the morning host, and WTBX program director Rich Collins assumed operations duties for the combined group.

In March 2004, Midwest Communications agreed to acquire the Iron Range station group operated by Heartland Communications Group, formerly Midwest Radio Network. Heartland was to exercise its option to purchase WUSZ from Virginia Broadcasting before completing the sale to Midwest. Heartland's purchase of WUSZ was priced at $1.35 million; the subsequent $5.8 million package comprised WUSZ, WTBX, WNMT, WMFG, WMFG-FM, and KMFG. Midwest completed the six-station acquisition on June 30, 2004.

A construction permit subsequently provided for WUSZ to use the transmitter site south of Hibbing shared by WTBX and WNMT. The FCC granted the license covering WUSZ's new facilities on November 18, 2005, authorizing 100,000 watts with an antenna 162 metres (531 ft) above average terrain.

In September 2015, Midwest appointed Baldrica to the newly created position of corporate country brand strategist, with on-air responsibilities at WUSZ and KTCO in Duluth. He resumed his former afternoon shift at WUSZ. In December 2024, Baldrica announced his retirement from full-time work, with his final WUSZ broadcast scheduled for December 13. In 2025, WUSZ remained a Midwest Communications country station using the "Radio USA" name.
