= WDSM =

Coordinates: 46°39′13″N 92°08′50″W

- Superior, Wisconsin; United States
- Broadcast area: Duluth-Superior
- Frequency: 710 kHz
- Branding: 710 The Game

Programming
- Format: Sports
- Affiliations: Westwood One Sports; Minnesota Wild; Packers Radio Network; Wisconsin Sports Radio Network

Ownership
- Owner: Midwest Communications; (Midwest Communications, Inc.)
- Sister stations: KDAL, KDAL-FM, KDKE, KTCO, WDUL

History
- First air date: October 1939; 87 years ago
- Call sign meaning: Duluth-Superior Mutual (original network)

Technical information
- Licensing authority: FCC
- Facility ID: 71356
- Class: B
- Power: 10,000 watts day; 5,000 watts night

Links
- Public license information: Public file; LMS
- Website: wdsm710.com

WDSM (710 AM) is a commercial radio station licensed to Superior, Wisconsin, serving the Duluth-Superior area of Northeastern Minnesota and Northwestern Wisconsin. WDSM is owned and operated by Midwest Communications and broadcasts a sports radio format. The radio studios and offices for WDSM, KDAL, KDAL-FM, KDKE, WDUL and KTCO are at 11 East Superior Street, Suite 380, in downtown Duluth.

By day, WDSM transmits with 10,000 watts non-directional. Because 710 AM is a clear channel frequency reserved for WOR New York City and KIRO Seattle, WDSM reduces power to 5,000 watts and uses a directional antenna with a four-tower array at night to avoid interference.

== Programming ==
WDSM airs a sports format branded as The Game with daytime programming originating from WSSP in Milwaukee's Wisconsin Sports Radio Network. The station airs Westwood One Sports nights and weekends. Some play by play sports events also air on WDSM when there are conflicts on KDAL.

In 2022, Midwest Communications merged the former news-talk format heard on WDSM into sister station KDAL. Local talk shows hosted by Neill Atkins and Brad Bennett can now be heard on KDAL, in addition to some of the syndicated programs previously heard on WDSM.

== History ==
WDSM signed on the air in October 1939. The requested call sign stood for "Duluth Superior Mutual", referring to the station's network affiliation with the Mutual Broadcasting System (MBS). WDSM provided Mutual programming throughout the Iron Range of Northern Minnesota as well as the Duluth-Superior market. It carried Mutual's dramas, comedies, news and sports during the "Golden Age of Radio".

In the early 1940s, WDSM was a 100-watt station and broadcast on 1200 kHz. The studios were in the Board of Trade Building in Superior. Robert Ridder purchased WDSM in 1948, and became its president.

WDSM switched network affiliations with WEBC (560 AM) in 1955. WEBC became the Mutual affiliate and WDSM began carrying NBC Radio programming and news. This was a direct result of WDSM's commitment to television and its founding of WDSM-TV on March 1, 1954, as an NBC affiliate (now KDLH-TV).

WDSM stayed with NBC Radio until the early 1990s. The station aired a country format during the 1980s, and then sports radio during the 1990s. Around 2000, WDSM switched to a talk radio format. It carried The Rush Limbaugh Show in middays as the cornerstone of its talk programming.

On February 7, 2022, WDSM changed its format from talk to sports, branded as "710 The Game".
