= KDKE =

Radio stations in Superior, Wisconsin

Coordinates: 46.789°N 92.119°W

Superior, Wisconsin; United States
- Broadcast area: Duluth-Superior
- Frequency: 102.5 MHz
- RDS: PI: 1A41
- Branding: 102.5 Duke FM

Programming
- Format: Classic country

Ownership
- Owner: Midwest Communications; (Midwest Communications, Inc.)
- Sister stations: KDAL; KDAL-FM; KTCO; WDSM; WDUL

History
- First air date: 1979 (as KZIO)
- Former call signs: KZIO (1979–1996); KRBR-FM (1996–2008); KHQG (2008–2010); KDWZ (2010–2016)
- Call sign meaning: Format and station named in tribute to Midwest Communications founder Duey "Duke" Wright

Technical information
- Facility ID: 71355
- Class: C1
- ERP: 100,000 watts
- HAAT: 183 m (600 ft)
- Repeater: 96.1 WDKE (Coleraine, Minnesota)

Links
- Webcast: Listen live
- Website: dukecountry.fm

KDKE (102.5 FM, "Duke FM") is a classic country radio station located in Duluth, Minnesota (licensed to Superior, Wisconsin). KDKE is owned by Midwest Communications, which also owns WDSM, WDUL, KDAL, KDAL-FM and KTCO in Duluth. All the Duluth stations share the same studio location at 11 East Superior St. Suite 380, downtown Duluth. Most of KDKE's personalities are voice-tracked or syndicated.

== History ==
The station was Top 40/CHR as "102.5 KZIO" (call sign now used by 104.3/94.1) until November 1996 when it switched to modern/alternative rock as "102.5 The Bear" with the KRBR-FM call sign. The Bear transitioned to active rock in 1998, and broadened its playlist by 2002. By 2006, "The Bear" moniker was dropped as the station branded as "102.5 KRBR" and added a significant amount of Classic Rock to its playlist to become a mainstream rock station. On March 3, 2008, KRBR-FM changed its call sign to KHQG, and began branding itself as "102.5 The Hog" while remaining with a mainstream rock format. In March 2009, KHQG shifted from mainstream rock to "Classic Rock 102.5." In the classic rock arena, 102.5 more solidly targeted the market's heritage classic rock station, KQDS-FM 94.9. The previous format had fallen between KQ and its active rock sister, 94X.

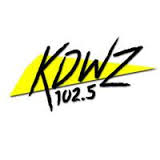
Former logo

On August 30, 2010, KHQG flipped back to Top 40 (CHR) as "102.5 KDWZ", the branding and callsign a nod to KDWB-FM in Minneapolis. The KDWZ call sign was previously used with Top 40 stations in Des Moines, Iowa (was known on-air as "Z93", now oldies formatted KIOA), and Grand Forks, North Dakota (now country formatted KYCK), in the 1980s.

On September 21, 2015, at 10 am, KDWZ flipped to Classic Country as "102.5 Duke FM". It currently airs a mix of classic country music. Many KDWZ staff members, including The Jake and Tanner Morning Show, moved to My 95.7. The station changed its call sign to the current KDKE on December 1, 2016.

KDKE began simulcasting on WDKE in Coleraine, Minnesota, in early 2025. WDKE had previously been a separately-programmed "Duke FM" station for the Iron Range.
