= KDAL (AM) =

Coordinates: 46°43′13.8″N 92°10′36.7″W

- Duluth, Minnesota; United States
- Broadcast area: Duluth-Superior
- Frequency: 610 kHz
- Branding: Nortland News Radio

Programming
- Format: News/talk
- Affiliations: NBC News Radio; Compass Media Networks; Premiere Networks; Minnesota News Network; Minnesota Timberwolves; Minnesota Twins; Minnesota Wild; KBJR-TV (local news and weather)

Ownership
- Owner: Midwest Communications; (Midwest Communications, Inc.)
- Sister stations: KDAL-FM; KTCO; WDSM; WDUL; KDKE

History
- First air date: November 22, 1936; 89 years ago
- Call sign meaning: Dalton Alexander LeMasurier (founder)

Technical information
- Licensing authority: FCC
- Facility ID: 60230
- Class: B
- Power: 5,000 watts
- Translator: 103.9 W280FB (Duluth)
- Repeater: 650 KDAH (Nashwauk)

Links
- Public license information: Public file; LMS
- Webcast: Listen live
- Website: northlandnewsradio.com

KDAL (610 kHz) is a commercial AM radio station in Duluth, Minnesota, serving the Duluth-Superior area of Northeastern Minnesota and Northwestern Wisconsin. KDAL is owned and operated by Midwest Communications and broadcasts a talk radio format. The studios and offices for KDAL, KDAL-FM, KDKE, WDSM, WDUL and KTCO are at 11 East Superior Street, Suite 380, in downtown Duluth.

By day, KDAL transmits with 5,000 watts non-directional. At night, to protect other stations on 610 AM, KDAL uses a directional antenna. Programming is also heard on 250-watt FM translator W280FB at 103.9 MHz and on KDAH (formerly WNMT) on the Iron Range.

== Programming ==
Weekdays begin with Dave Stranberg and the KDAL Morning Show, featuring news, sports, weather, school closings and local information. Bruce Ciskie hosts a late morning sports show and Bob Sansevere is heard in afternoons. The rest of the weekday schedule comes from nationally syndicated talk shows including The Ramsey Show with Dave Ramsey, Markley, VanCamp and Robbins, Our American Stories with Lee Habeeb, Ground Zero with Clyde Lewis, This Morning, America's First News with Gordon Deal and Coast to Coast AM with George Noory.

Weekends feature shows on health, money, religion, technology, travel, cars and home repair, with a polka music show on Saturday mornings. Weekend syndicated shows include Leo Laporte, The Tech Guy, Somewhere in Time with Art Bell and World Travel Connection with Rudy Maxa. KDAL broadcasts Minnesota Twins baseball and University of Minnesota Duluth Bulldogs college football and basketball. Most hours begin with world and national news from NBC News Radio. Local news and weather is supplied by KBJR-TV.

== History ==
KDAL signed on the air as a 100-watt station at 1500 kHz on November 22, 1936. The KDAL call sign came from the station's founder, Dalton A. LeMasurier, who was president and general manager of KDAL for many years. On September 5, 1937, power increased to 250 watts and the station joined the CBS Radio Network. KDAL broadcast CBS's dramas, comedies, news, sports, soap operas, game shows and big band broadcasts during the "Golden Age of Radio". With the enactment of the North American Regional Broadcasting Agreement (NARBA), the station moved to 1490 kHz in early 1941.

KDAL switched frequencies to the current 610 kHz on October 24, 1941, increasing power to 1,000 watts. The switchover was dramatically made from a plane flying over the city. In 1947, a new transmitter and tower were constructed at 63rd Avenue West along the harborfront. The facilities remain to this day. KDAL got another power increase again to 5,000 watts on August 7, 1947. A new transmitter and tower were constructed for the boost in wattage. This enabled KDAL to serve a wider area. The event was celebrated with a "Kilowatt Karnival" in the Duluth Armory.

In the 1948-1949 season, CBS raided NBC and grabbed some of their biggest stars. Radio's highest rated program, The Jack Benny Program, moved to CBS and KDAL in January 1949. Amos 'n' Andy, George Burns and Gracie Allen, Edgar Bergen and Charlie McCarthy, and Bing Crosby also made the switch. CBS was suddenly the number one network and KDAL finally made some headway against NBC affiliate WEBC.

KDAL made the jump to television as KDAL-TV (now KDLH) in 1953. FM station KDAL-FM went on the air in 1985.

Network programming moved from radio to television in the 1950s. KDAL featured a full service, middle of the road (MOR) format of popular music, news and sports in the 1950s, 1960s and 1970s. In the 1980s and 1990s, the music was updated to adult contemporary. By the late 1990s, the music shows were eliminated and the station became a full time talk outlet.

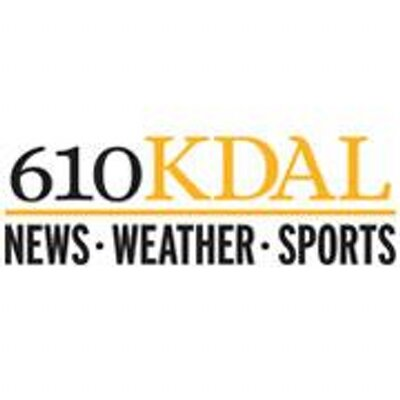
Logo prior to FM translator.

Logo prior to simulcast on KDAH

In the beginning of the 2000s, Midwest acquired KDAL, KDAL-FM, KRBR-FM, WDSM, KTCO and KXTP in the Duluth/Superior market. KDAL would gain an additional sister station in the form of KQDS-FM in 2016, acquired by Midwest from Red Rock Radio.

In 2022, Midwest Communications merged the news-talk programming of sister station WDSM into KDAL. Simultaneously, WDUL's sports-talk format was moved to WDSM. AM 710 is now branded as The Game with most programming originating from WRNW in Milwaukee. The 98.1 translator from WDSM moved to WDUL, which now airs an active rock format as 98X.

On October 1, 2025, KDAL rebranded as "Nortland News Radio" and began simulcasting on KDAH in Nashwauk.

In May of 2026, coinciding with the closure of CBS News Radio, KDAL became an NBC News Radio affiliate.
