= WMFG (AM) =

- Hibbing, Minnesota; United States
- Broadcast area: Iron Range
- Frequency: 1240 kHz
- Branding: America's Best Music

Programming
- Format: Adult standards
- Affiliations: Westwood One

Ownership
- Owner: Midwest Communications; (Midwest Communications, Inc.)
- Sister stations: KDAH; KQDX; WDKE; WEVE-FM; WTBX; WUSZ

History
- First air date: October 12, 1935
- Former call signs: WMFG (1935–1983); WGGR (1983–1987)
- Former frequencies: 1210 kHz (1935-1941)

Technical information
- Licensing authority: FCC
- Facility ID: 60911
- Class: C
- Power: 1,000 watts unlimited
- Transmitter coordinates: 47°24′29.8″N 92°57′4.7″W

Links
- Public license information: Public file; LMS
- Website: mwcradio.com/station/wmfg-am/

WMFG (1240 kHz) is an AM radio station broadcasting an adult standards format. Licensed to Hibbing, Minnesota, United States, the station serves the Iron Range area. The station is owned by Midwest Communications and features programming from Westwood One.

Midwest owns five radio stations on the Iron Range; KDAH, KQDX, WMFG, WTBX, and WUSZ. All five stations share the same studio location on W. 37th Street in Hibbing.

== History ==
The Federal Communications Commission (FCC) granted the Head of the Lakes Broadcasting Company a construction permit for WMFG on October 16, 1934, authorizing 100 watts on 1210 kHz in Hibbing. The station's first license was issued on September 24, 1935. WMFG began broadcasting in 1935 from the Androy Hotel, becoming the first radio station on Minnesota's Iron Range. Morgan Murphy, publisher of the Superior Telegram, and Walter Bridges, manager of WEBC in Duluth–Superior, held interests in both WMFG and WEBC.

Daytime power was licensed at 250 watts in December 1936, with nighttime power remaining at 100 watts. WMFG was a CBS affiliate by 1938. The FCC authorized 250-watt nighttime operation on September 6, 1939, and reassigned WMFG to 1240 kHz effective March 29, 1941, under the North American Regional Broadcasting Agreement. WMFG also belonged to the Arrowhead Network, which interconnected the Head of the Lakes company's three stations—WEBC, WMFG, and WHLB in Virginia—for shared programming.

In 1954, the FCC authorized moving WMFG's studios and transmitter out of the Androy Hotel. The relocated facilities, at West 37th Street and Seventh Avenue West, were licensed on November 21, 1955. Assignment of the license to the Hibbing Broadcasting Company was approved on September 17, 1958, and became effective on November 1. Frank P. Befera obtained controlling interest in Hibbing Broadcasting on March 14, 1960, by purchasing shares from Harold J. Parise and Selma Parise. The 1960 Broadcasting Yearbook listed WMFG as an NBC affiliate. On September 6, 1961, the FCC licensed 1,000-watt daytime operation; nighttime power remained 250 watts.

The AM station's call sign changed to WGGR on November 1, 1983. In June 1987, Radio & Records reported a $110,000 agreement to sell WGGR and its 106.3 MHz FM companion, which then used the WMFG call letters, from Hibbing Broadcasting to DNS Broadcasting Inc. The report identified Regina Stockman as Hibbing Broadcasting's president and listed the stations with a contemporary hit radio format. The FCC approved the AM license assignment on July 7, 1987, and the WMFG call sign was restored to the AM station on August 5.

By early 1997, WMFG had replaced adult standards programming with a sports format. A further sale was reported in July 2000, when Al Quarnstrom and Dennis Martin agreed to sell WMFG, WMFG-FM, and KMFG to Midwest Radio Network LLC for $2.15 million. Midwest Radio Network, headed by Thomas L. Bookey, already owned WNMT and WTBX in the Hibbing market. The FCC approved assignment of WMFG's license on August 9, 2000.

In March 2004, Heartland Communications Group, formerly Midwest Radio Network, agreed to sell its Iron Range station group to Midwest Communications. The six-station package comprised WMFG, WMFG-FM, WTBX, WNMT, KMFG, and WUSZ; WMFG was still carrying sports programming at the time of the agreement. Midwest Communications dates completion of the acquisition to June 30, 2004.

By January 2005, following the ownership change, WMFG had dropped sports for soft oldies programming, also described as adult standards. During an August 2005 visit, radio writer Scott Fybush documented the group's studios at 807 West 37th Street in Hibbing. The site housed all six stations' studios, and WMFG shared its tower with WMFG-FM and KMFG. As of October 2026, Midwest described WMFG's format as adult standards under the "America's Best Music" name, with Minnesota Twins baseball and Minnesota Wild hockey broadcasts.
