= KTCO =

Coordinates: 46.791°N 92.117°W

- Duluth, Minnesota; United States
- Broadcast area: Duluth-Superior
- Frequency: 98.9 MHz
- Branding: Kat Country 98.9

Programming
- Format: Commercial; Country

Ownership
- Owner: Midwest Communications; (Midwest Communications, Inc.)
- Sister stations: KDAL, KDAL-FM, KDKE, WDSM, WDUL

History
- First air date: September 1974
- Former call signs: WAKX (1974–1994)
- Call sign meaning: KaT COuntry

Technical information
- Licensing authority: FCC
- Facility ID: 26591
- Class: C1
- ERP: 100,000 watts
- HAAT: 183 m (600 ft)

Links
- Public license information: Public file; LMS
- Webcast: Listen Live
- Website: katcountry989.com

KTCO (98.9 FM, "Kat Country 98.9") is a radio station in Duluth, Minnesota, airing a country music format. KTCO is owned by Midwest Communications, which also owns KDKE, WDSM, WDUL, KDAL, and KDAL-FM in Duluth. All the Duluth stations share the same studio location at 11 East Superior St. Suite 380, downtown Duluth.

From 1974 to 1994, this frequency respectively aired Top 40, soft rock, and classic rock, as "99 WAKX." The station originally went on air in 1972 as a beautiful music station, KPIR-FM "Pier 99."

Its main competitor is Townsquare Media's KKCB "B105".
