= WQRM =

- Duluth, Minnesota; United States
- Broadcast area: Duluth–Superior
- Frequency: 850 kHz

Programming
- Format: Christian radio
- Network: VCY America

Ownership
- Owner: VCY America

History
- First air date: April 26, 1963
- Former call signs: WWJC (1963–2014)
- Former frequencies: 1270 kHz (1963–1970)

Technical information
- Licensing authority: FCC
- Facility ID: 74191
- Class: D
- Power: 50,000 watts (days only); 14,000 watts (critical hours)
- Transmitter coordinates: 46°39′19.00″N 92°12′40.00″W
- Translator: 97.7 W249CX (Duluth)

Links
- Public license information: Public file; LMS
- Webcast: Listen live
- Website: vcyamerica.org

WQRM (850 AM) is a non-commercial radio station licensed to Duluth, Minnesota, United States. Operating during the daytime hours only, it carries a Christian radio format, owned and operated by VCY America. WQRM's transmitter is on East McCuen Street in Duluth, near the St. Louis River.

Programming is heard around the clock on 250-watt FM translator W249CX at 97.7 MHz.

== History ==
The station signed on the air on April 26, 1963, as WWJC. It has always broadcast a Christian radio format. The original owner was the Twin Ports Christian Broadcasting Corporation. It originally broadcast at 1270 kHz and ran 5,000 watts. Its original city of license was Superior, Wisconsin. In 1970, its frequency was changed to 850 kHz which was coupled with a power increase to 10,000 watts. The city of license was changed to Duluth, Minnesota.

In 2014, the station was sold to VCY America for $400,000. In 2016, WQRM was granted a license to increase daytime power to 50,000 watts, with critical hours set at 14,000 watts.

On August 8, 2021, WQRM was the victim of a fire that totally destroyed the new transmitter as well as the backup transmitters. The fire caused over $500,000 in damage to the transmitter and other equipment and $75,000 in structural damage.
