= KJOQ =

Coordinates: 46°43′28″N 92°07′11″W

- Duluth, Minnesota; United States
- Broadcast area: Duluth MN–WI Metropolitan Area
- Frequency: 1490 kHz
- Branding: Worship 24/7

Programming
- Format: Worship music

Ownership
- Owner: Daniel and Alana Hatfield; (Twin Ports Radio, LLC)

History
- First air date: March 11, 1963; 63 years ago
- Former call signs: KAOH (1963–1980); KQDS (1980–1981); WNLT (1981–1984); KBXT (1984–1988); KQDS (1988–1997); KDDS (1997–1999); KQDS (1999–2017)
- Call sign meaning: "Jock" (previous format)

Technical information
- Licensing authority: FCC
- Facility ID: 65661
- Class: C
- Power: 1,000 watts
- Translator: 100.9 W265DO (Duluth)

Links
- Public license information: Public file; LMS
- Webcast: Listen Live
- Website: worship247.com

KJOQ (1490 AM, "Worship 24/7") is a commercial AM radio station in Duluth, Minnesota. Established in 1963 as KAOH, the station is owned by Daniel and Alana Hatfield, through licensee Twin Ports Radio, LLC, and airs a worship music format. The studios are located in Duluth's Central Hillside at 806 East 4th street in Duluth. The AM transmitter is located off Maryland Avenue in Superior, Wisconsin and the 100.9 FM translator is co-located with former sister station WWPE-FM 92.1 in the Duluth antenna farm.

== History ==
The station first signed on the air on March 11, 1963, using the original call letters KAOH. It was established by Great Duluth Broadcasting, Inc. and originally broadcast on 1390 kHz before moving to its long-time home at 1490 kHz. In 1980, the station adopted the KQDS call sign to align with its FM sister station, a name derived from the phrase "Quality Duluth-Superior." Throughout the 1980s and 1990s, the station underwent frequent identity shifts, briefly operating as WNLT, KBXT, and KDDS before returning to the KQDS identity in 1999.

The then-KQDS previously aired a progressive talk radio format with programming from Air America Radio along with The Ed Schultz Show until February 2007, when it began airing an oldies format with Scott Shannon's True Oldies Channel from ABC Radio.

In 2009, the station became the Duluth affiliate for the FAN Radio Network, providing Minnesota-centric sports talk.

On April 19, 2017 Red Rock Radio announced that it would sell KQDS and WWAX to Twin Ports Radio for $200,000; through a time brokerage agreement, Twin Ports assumed control of the stations on May 1. Twin Ports' owner, Dan Hatfield, also runs Christian radio station WJRF; following the sale, WWAX and KQDS were to move their studios to WJRF's facilities, but would retain their sports formats. The terms of the sale required KQDS to change its call letters. Upon consummation of the sale on June 30, 2017, KQDS changed their call letters to KJOQ and rebranded as "The Jock 1490".

At the end of February 2021, it was announced that the Oregon-based radio network Worship 24/7 would begin operations on KJOQ by March 8 of the same year. On March 7, 2021, KJOQ switched to the Worship 24/7 network. The AM signal is supplemented by FM translator W265DO at 100.9 MHz, which began broadcasting in January 2018 to provide better coverage to the Duluth area.
