= Twin Ports =

Duluth–Superior Duluth, MN–WI MSA Twin Ports
- MSA
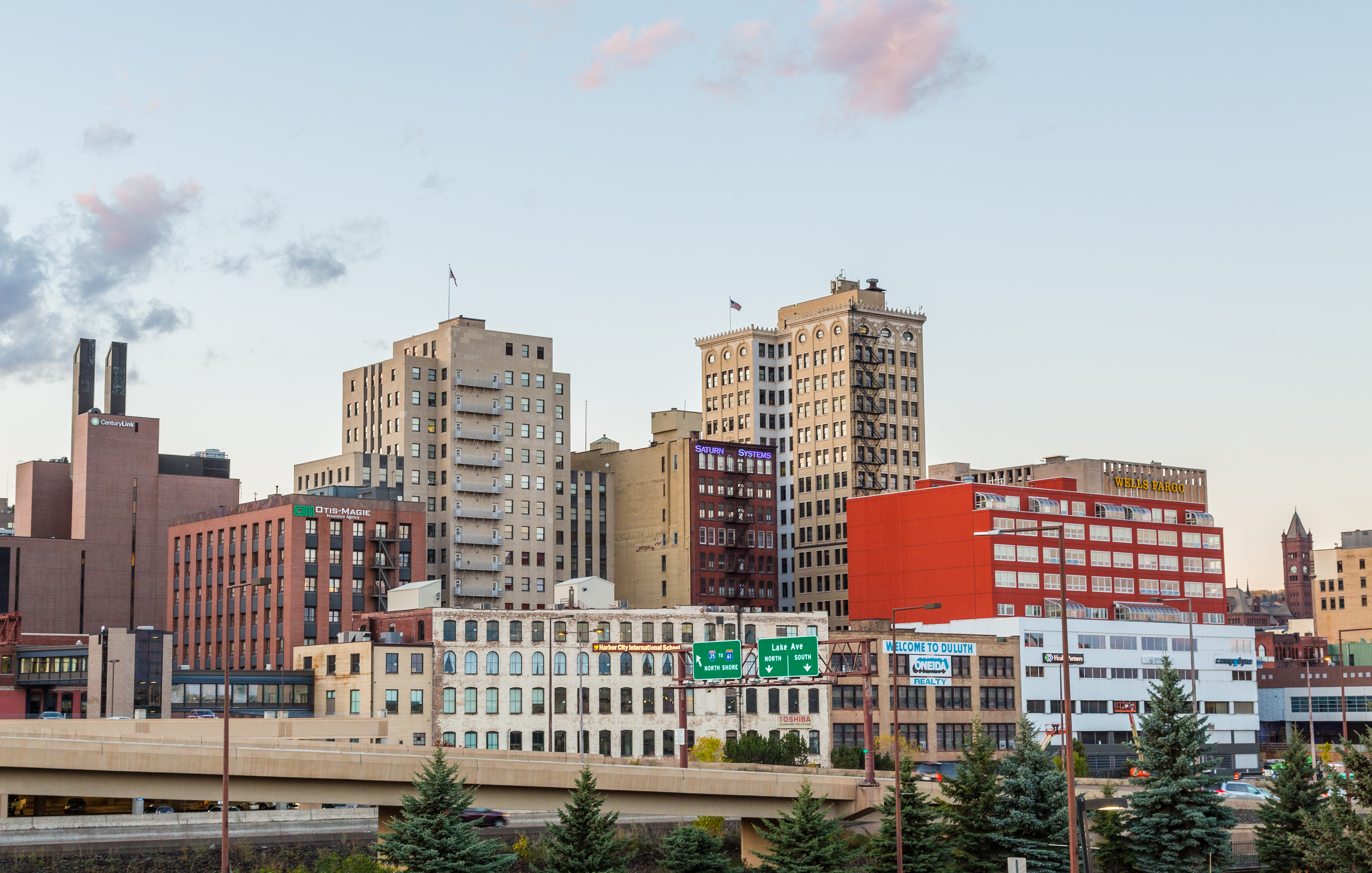
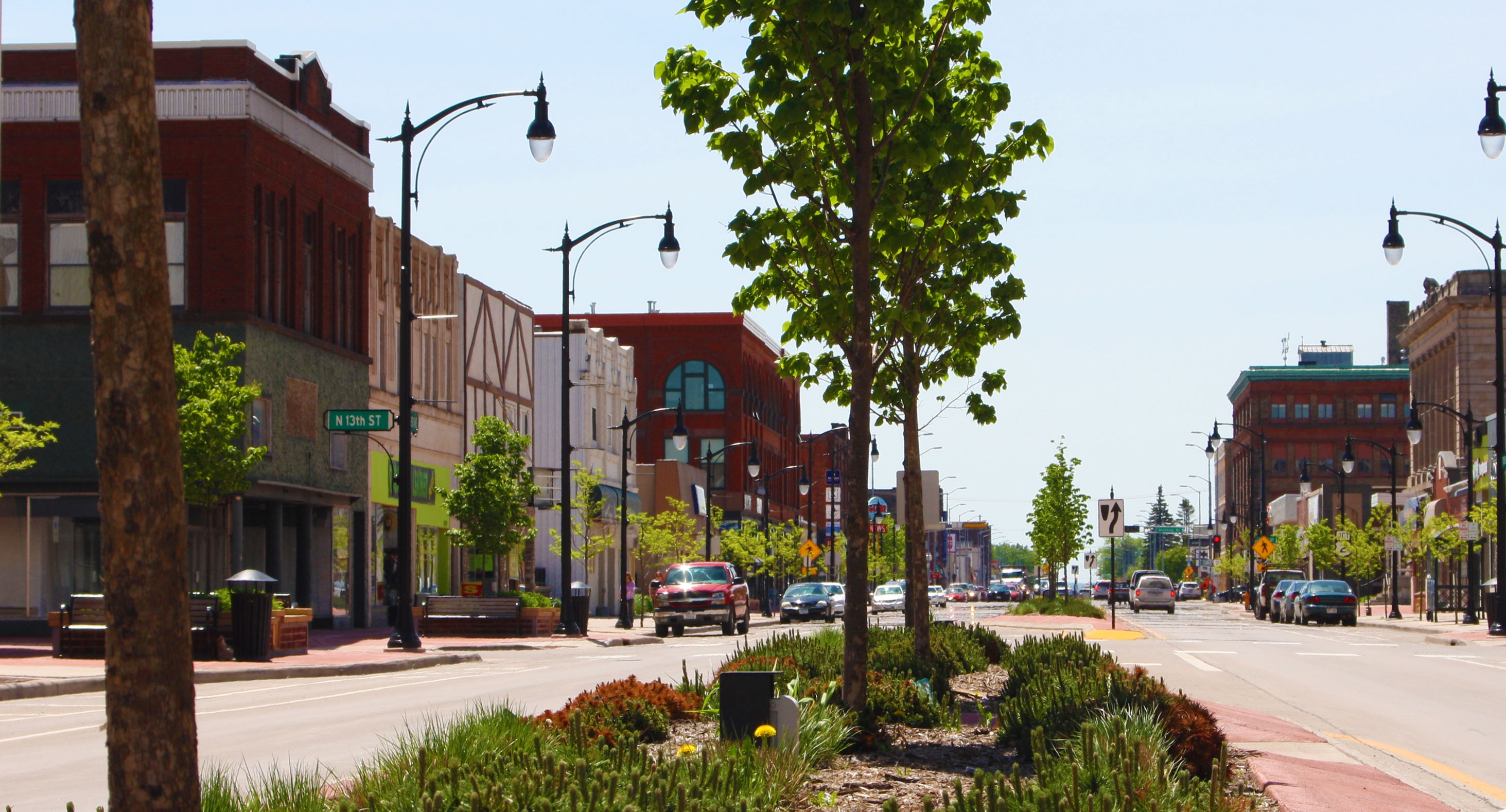
- Duluth skyline (top) and Downtown Superior (bottom)
Map of Duluth–Grand Rapids, MN–WI CSA
Duluth, MN–WI MSA
Grand Rapids, MN µSA
City of Duluth
City of Superior
- Country: United States
- State: Minnesota; Wisconsin
- Principal cities: Duluth, Minnesota; Superior, Wisconsin; Grand Rapids, Minnesota

Area
  - Urban: 80 sq mi (208 km^{2})

Population
  - MSA: 291,638

GDP
  - Metro: $16.822 billion (2022)
- Time zone: UTC−6 (CST)
  - Summer (DST): UTC−5 (CDT)
- Area codes: 218, 715, 320

The Twin Ports, is a small metropolitan area centered around the cities of Duluth, Minnesota, and Superior, Wisconsin. They are located at the western part of Lake Superior (the westernmost part of North America's Great Lakes) and together are considered one of the larger cargo ports in the United States. The form the urban core of the Duluth, MN-WI Metropolitan Statistical Area. The Twin Ports are close to many natural attractions such as the North Shore, the North Country National Scenic Trail, the Apostle Islands, and the Superior National Forest.

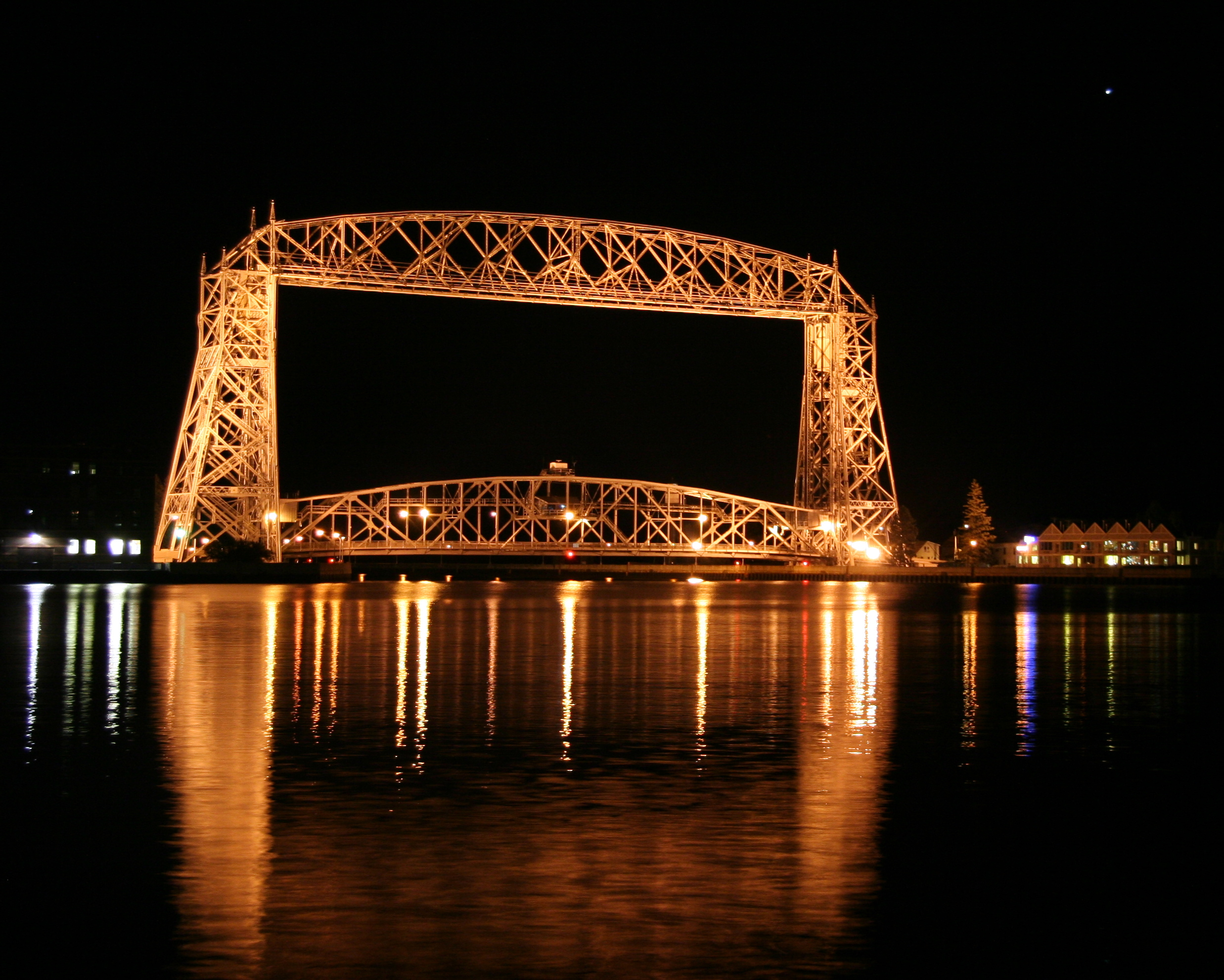
The Duluth Aerial Lift Bridge

The area is home to two long bridges: the Richard I. Bong Memorial Bridge (carrying U.S. Route 2) and the John Blatnik Bridge (carrying Interstate 535 and U.S. Route 53). Each bridge reaches across more than 1.5 miles (2.5 km) across the mouth of the Saint Louis River. The Aerial Lift Bridge was constructed in 1905 and is on the National Register of Historic Places. It must be raised each time a vessel enters or leaves Duluth's harbor; the inlet on the Wisconsin side is not similarly obstructed.

Together, the cities rank as the 20th-busiest port in the country by tonnage, with over 29 million short tons (26.3 million tonnes) of cargo volume in 2022.

== Infrastructure ==
The four tallest buildings are in Duluth, the Alworth Building, Historic Old Central High School, Maurices Headquarters, Medical Arts Building. The Bong Bridge leads to from Duluth to Superior. The Bong bridge was built in 1985 and is 11,800 ft (3,600 m) long. The Blatnik Bridge also leads to from Duluth to Superior. The Blatnik Bridge was built in 1965 and is 7,975 feet (2,431 m) long. Canal Park is a heavy tourist area in Downtown Duluth. In Virginia the tallest bridge in Minnesota (Hwy 53 Bridge) connecting Eveleth to Virginia. The Hwy 53 Bridge covers the Rouchleau Mine. The bridge opened in 2017 and is 204 ft. high in the air and spans 1,125 ft.

=== Hospitals ===
- Essentia Health St. Mary's Medical Center - Duluth - (Level 1 Trauma Center)
- St. Luke's Hospital - Duluth - (Level 2 Trauma Center)
- Essentia Health St. Mary's Hospital - Superior - (Level 4 Trauma Center)
- Community Memorial Hospital - Cloquet - (Level 4 Trauma Center)

=== Shopping ===
- Miller Hill Mall

=== Attractions ===
- Aerial Lift Bridge
- AMSOIL Arena
- Anchor Bar and Grill
- Bayfront Festival Park
- Blatnik Bridge
- Canal Park
- Enger Tower
- Glensheen Mansion
- Gooseberry Falls
- Great Lakes Aquarium
- Lake Superior Railroad Museum
- Leif Erikson Ship
- Minnesota Point
- Nemadji Golf Course
- Oldest Operating Hockey Arena in Minnesota
- Spirit Mountain Ski Area
- Superior City FC Soccer Games
- Tallest Bridge in Minnesota
- World's Largest Freestanding Hockey Stick

== Education ==
=== Colleges and universities ===
- College of St. Scholastica - Duluth
- Fond du Lac Tribal and Community College - Cloquet
- Lake Superior College - Duluth
- Northwood Technical College - Superior, Wisconsin
- University of Minnesota Duluth - Duluth
- University of Wisconsin, Superior - Superior, Wisconsin

== Transportation ==
=== Major highways ===
==== Interstates ====
- I-35
- I-535

==== U.S. Highways ====
- US 2
- US 53
- US 169

==== Minnesota Highways ====
- MN 23
- MN 61 – North Shore
- MN 194 – Central Entrance – Mesaba Avenue
- MN 210

==== St. Louis County Highways ====
- Saint Louis County Road 4 – Rice Lake Road

=== Transit ===
- Duluth Transit Authority
- Arrowhead Transit Buses
- Indian Trails
- Jefferson Lines

=== Airports ===
- Duluth International Airport - Duluth (DLH)
- Sky Harbor Airport & Seaplane Base - Duluth (KDYT)
- Cloquet Carlton County Airport - Cloquet (COQ)

== Duluth, MN-WI Metropolitan Statistical Area ==
The Duluth, MN–WI Metropolitan Statistical Area covers an area much larger than the Twin Ports urban area. The MSA includes 3 counties, of which two are in Minnesota and one is in Wisconsin. St. Louis County is Minnesota's largest county by area.

Duluth, MN–WI Metropolitan Statistical Area

County	Seat	2025 Estimate	2020 Census	Change	Area	Density
St. Louis	Duluth	200,518	200,231	+0.14%	6,860 sq mi (17,800 km^{2})	29/sq mi (11/km^{2})
Douglas, WI	Superior	43,990	44,295	−0.69%	1,480 sq mi (3,800 km^{2})	30/sq mi (11/km^{2})
Carlton	Carlton	36,711	36,207	+1.39%	875 sq mi (2,270 km^{2})	42/sq mi (16/km^{2})
Total		281,219	280,733	+0.17%	9,215 sq mi (23,870 km^{2})	31/sq mi (12/km^{2})

The Duluth–Grand Rapids, MN–WI Combined Statistical Area is made up of three counties in Minnesota and one county in Wisconsin. The statistical area includes the Duluth, MN–WI Metropolitan Statistical Area and the Grand Rapids, MN Micropolitan Statistical Area.

Statistical Area	2025 Estimate	2020 Census	Change	Area	Density
Duluth, MN–WI Metropolitan Statistical Area	281,219	280,733	+0.17%	9,215 sq mi (23,870 km^{2})	31/sq mi (12/km^{2})
Grand Rapids, MN Micropolitan Statistical Area	45,404	45,014	+0.87%	2,668 sq mi (6,910 km^{2})	17/sq mi (7/km^{2})
Total	326,623	325,747	+0.27%	11,883 sq mi (30,780 km^{2})	27/sq mi (11/km^{2})

The following is a list of places in the three-county Duluth, MN–WI Metropolitan Area categorized based on the United States Census Bureau 2025 population estimates. This list includes census-designated places (CDPs) and villages in Wisconsin, but excludes unincorporated towns in Wisconsin, known as civil townships in other states. No population estimates are released for CDPs, which are marked with an asterisk (*) and categorized based on their 2020 Census population.

=== Principal city ===
- Duluth (88,330)

=== Places with 10,000 to 50,000 inhabitants ===
- Superior, WI (26,397)
- Hibbing (15,823)
- Cloquet (12,399)
- Hermantown (10,110)

=== Places with fewer than 10,000 inhabitants ===
- Virginia (8,187)
- Chisholm (4,625)
- Rice Lake (4,169)
- Eveleth (3,381)
- Ely (3,231)
- Proctor (3,054)
- Moose Lake (2,948)
- Mountain Iron (2,835)
- Esko* (2,082)
- Hoyt Lakes (1,978)
- Gilbert (1,644)
- Aurora (1,643)
- Babbitt (1,363)
- Lake Nebagamon, WI (1,134)
- Scanlon (989)
- Biwabik (970)
- Carlton (965)
- Buhl (946)
- Solon Springs, WI (674)
- Superior (village), WI (664)
- Poplar, WI (626)
- Barnum (605)
- Cook (515)
- Floodwood (511)
- Big Lake* (464)
- Wrenshall (457)
- Tower (422)
- Oliver, WI (409)
- Soudan* (285)
- Mahtowa* (332)
- Cromwell (258)
- Mahnomen* (231)
- Nett Lake* (230)
- Orr (210)
- Brule, WI* (208)
- Wright (170)
- Kettle River (168)
- Winton (161)
- Kinney (148)
- Gordon, WI* (145)
- Meadowlands (137)
- Brookston (113)
- Iron Junction (105)
- McKinley (103)
- Leonidas (51)

== See also ==
- List of ports in the United States
- McDougall Duluth Shipbuilding Company
- Fraser Shipyards
