= List of high schools in North Dakota =

This is a list of high schools in the state of North Dakota.

== Adams County ==
- Hettinger High School - Hettinger

== Barnes County ==
- Valley City High School - Valley City
- Barnes County North High School - Wimbledon

=== Defunct ===
- North Central High School - Rogers (closed in 2016)
- Wimbledon-Courtenay High School - Wimbledon (closed 2016)

== Benson County ==
- Four Winds Community High School - Fort Totten
- Leeds High School - Leeds
- Maddock High School - Maddock
- Minnewaukan High School - Minnewaukan
- Warwick High School - Warwick

== Bottineau County ==
- Bottineau High School - Bottineau
- Newburg-United High School - Newburg
- Westhope High School - Westhope
- Willow City High School - Willow City

== Bowman County ==
- Bowman County High School - Bowman
- Scranton High School - Scranton

=== Defunct ===
- Rhame High School - Rhame (closed in 2006)

== Burke County ==
- Bowbells High School - Bowbells
- Burke Central High School - Lignite
- Powers Lake High School - Powers Lake

== Burleigh County ==
- Wing High School - Wing

=== Bismarck ===
- Bismarck High School
- Century High School
- Dakota Adventist Academy
- Legacy High School
- St. Mary's Central High School
- Shiloh Christian High School
- South Central Alternative High School

== Cass County ==
- Central Cass High School - Casselton
- Horace High School - Horace
- Kindred High School - Kindred
- Maple Valley High School - Tower City
- Northern Cass High School - Hunter

=== Fargo ===
- Fargo Davies High School
- Fargo North High School
- Fargo South High School
- Oak Grove Lutheran School
- Shanley High School

=== West Fargo ===
- Sheyenne High School
- West Fargo Community High School
- West Fargo High School

== Cavalier County ==
- Border Central High School - Calvin
- Langdon Area High School - Langdon
- Munich High School - Munich

== Dickey County ==
- Ellendale High School - Ellendale
- Oakes High School - Oakes

== Divide County ==
- Divide County High School - Crosby

== Dunn County ==
- Halliday High School - Halliday
- Killdeer High School - Killdeer

=== Defunct ===
- Dodge High School - Dodge
- Dunn Center High School - Dunn Center

== Eddy County ==
- New Rockford-Sheyenne High School - New Rockford (formerly called New Rockford High School)

=== Defunct ===
- Sheyenne High School - Sheyenne
- St. James High School New Rockford

== Emmons County ==
- Hazelton-Moffit-Braddock High School - Hazelton
- Linton High School - Linton
- Strasburg High School - Strasburg

== Foster County ==
- Carrington High School - Carrington
- Midkota High School - Glenfield

== Golden Valley County ==
- Beach High School - Beach

== Grand Forks County ==
- Larimore High School - Larimore
- Midway High School - Inkster
- Northwood High School - Northwood
- Thompson High School - Thompson

=== Grand Forks ===
- Central High School
- Red River High School

== Grant County ==
- Elgin/New Leipzig High School - Elgin
- Roosevelt High School - Carson

=== Defunct ===
- Border Central High School - Carson (closed in 2006)

== Griggs County ==
- Griggs County Central High School - Cooperstown
- Midkota Middle School - Binford

== Hettinger County ==
- Mott/Regent High School - Mott
- New England High School - New England

== Kidder County ==
- Steele-Dawson High School - Steele
- Tappen High School - Tappen
- Tuttle-Pettibone High School - Tuttle

== LaMoure County ==
- Edgeley High School - Edgeley
- Kulm High School - Kulm
- LaMoure High School - LaMoure
- Litchville-Marion High School - Marion

=== Defunct ===
- Verona High School - Verona (closed in 2006)

== Logan County ==
- Gackle-Streeter High School - Gackle
- Napoleon High School - Napoleon

== McHenry County ==
- Anamoose High School - Anamoose
- Drake High School - Drake
- Granville High School - Granville
- TGU-Towner High School - Towner
- Velva High School - Velva

== McIntosh County ==
- Ashley High School - Ashley
- Wishek High School - Wishek
- Zeeland High School - Zeeland

== McKenzie County ==
- Alexander High School - Alexander
- Mandaree High School - Mandaree

=== Watford City ===
- Johnson Corners Christian Academy
- Watford City High School

== McLean County ==
- Garrison High School - Garrison
- Max High School - Max
- Turtle Lake-Mercer High School - Turtle Lake
- Underwood High School - Underwood
- Washburn High School - Washburn
- White Shield High School - White Shield
- Wilton High School - Wilton

=== Defunct ===
- Riverdale High School - Riverdale

== Mercer County ==
- Beulah High School - Beulah
- Hazen High School - Hazen
- Stanton High School - Stanton

=== Defunct ===
- Golden Valley High School - Golden Valley
- Zap High School - Zap

== Morton County ==
- Flasher High School - Flasher
- Glen Ullin High School - Glen Ullin
- Hebron High School - Hebron
- New Salem High School - New Salem

=== Mandan ===
- Mandan High School
- School of the Holy Family

== Mountrail County ==
- New Town High School - New Town
- Parshall High School - Parshall
- Stanley High School - Stanley

== Nelson County ==
- Dakota Prairie High School - Petersburg
- Lakota High School - Lakota

== Oliver County ==
- Center-Stanton High School - Center

== Pembina County ==
- Cavalier High School - Cavalier
- Drayton High School - Drayton
- Neche High School - Neche
- Pembina High School - Pembina
- St. Thomas High School - Saint Thomas
- Valley High School - Crystal
- Walhalla High School - Walhalla

== Pierce County ==
- Rugby High School - Rugby

== Ramsey County ==
- Devils Lake High School - Devils Lake
- Edmore High School - Edmore
- Starkweather High School - Starkweather

== Ransom County ==
- Enderlin High School - Enderlin
- Lisbon High School - Lisbon

== Renville County ==
- Glenburn High School - Glenburn
- Mohall Lansford Sherwood High School - Mohall

=== Defunct ===
- Mohall High School - Mohall
- Sherwood High School - Sherwood

== Richland County ==
- Fairmount Public School - Fairmount
- Hankinson High School - Hankinson
- Lidgerwood High School - Lidgerwood
- Richland Junior-Senior High School - Colfax
- Wahpeton High School - Wahpeton
- Wyndmere High School - Wyndmere

== Rolette County ==
- Dunseith High School - Dunseith
- Mount Pleasant High School - Rolla
- Rolette High School - Rolette
- St. John High School - Saint John
- Turtle Mountain High School - Belcourt

== Sargent County ==
- Milnor High School - Milnor
- North Sargent High School - Gwinner
- Sargent Central High School - Forman

== Sheridan County ==
- Goodrich High School - Goodrich
- McClusky High School - McClusky

== Sioux County ==
- Selfridge High School - Selfridge
- Solen High School - Solen
- Standing Rock Community School - Fort Yates

== Stark County ==
- Belfield High School - Belfield
- Richardton-Taylor High School - Richardton
- South Heart High School - South Heart

=== Defunct ===
- Gladstone High School - Gladstone

=== Dickinson ===
- Dickinson High School
- Hope Christian Academy High School
- Trinity High School

== Steele County ==
- Finley-Sharon High School - Finley
- Hope-Page High School - Hope

== Stutsman County ==
- Jamestown High School - Jamestown
- Kensal High School - Kensal
- Medina High School - Medina
- Montpelier High School - Montpelier
- Pingree-Buchanan High School - Pingree

== Towner County ==
- North Star High School - Cando (formerly Cando High School)

=== Defunct ===
- Bisbee-Egeland High School - Bisbee (closed in 2008)
- North Central High School - Rocklake

== Traill County ==
- Central Valley High School - Buxton
- Hatton High School - Hatton
- Hillsboro High School - Hillsboro
- May-Port CG High School - Mayville

== Walsh County ==
- Edinburg High School - Edinburg
- Fordville-Lankin High School - Fordville
- Grafton High School - Grafton
- Minto High School - Minto
- Park River Area High School - Park River
- Valley High School - Hoople

=== Defunct ===
- Adams High School - Adams

== Ward County ==
- Des Lacs-Burlington High School - Des Lacs/Burlington
- Kenmare High School - Kenmare
- Lewis & Clark High School - Berthold
- Lewis & Clark North Shore - Plaza
- Sawyer School - Sawyer
- Surrey High School - Surrey

=== Minot ===
- Bishop Ryan High School
- Dakota Memorial High School
- Minot High School
- Minot North High School
- Nedrose High School
- Our Redeemer's High School
- South Prairie High School

== Wells County ==
- Fessenden-Bowdon High School - Fessenden
- Harvey High School - Harvey

=== Defunct ===
- Bowdon High School - Bowdon
- Sykes High School - Sykeston

== Williams County ==
- Eight Mile High School - Trenton
- Grenora High School - Grenora
- Ray High School - Ray
- Tioga High School - Tioga

=== Williston ===
- Trinity Christian High School
- Williston High School - Williston, North Dakota

=== Defunct ===
- Epping High School - Epping
- Wildrose-Alamo High School - Wildrose (closed in 2006)

== See also ==
- List of school districts in North Dakota
- List of high schools in the United States
