= Dakota Bowl =

The Dakota Bowl is the North Dakota High School Activities Association football championship weekend played at the Fargodome in Fargo, North Dakota. The first "original" Dakota Bowl was in 1978 in Sioux Falls, South Dakota. Bob Burns coach at O'Gorman brought the game to life as a fundraiser for Sioux Falls Catholic Schools. It has raised about 4 million dollars to date. It attracts over 10,000 fans yearly.

== History ==
The Dakota Bowl began in 1993 with the opening of the Fargodome. Prior to the Dakota Bowl, the football championship games were held at various sites across the state. Beginning in 2002, with the opening of the Alerus Center in Grand Forks, the Dakota Bowl alternated between the Fargodome (odd years) and the Alerus Center (even years). Starting in 2015, the Dakota Bowl will be held at the Fargodome until at least 2020.

== Results ==
=== 11-Man ===
==== Three Class System (1993–1996) ====
===== Class A =====
Year	Location	Champion	Runner-up	Score
1993	Fargodome	West Fargo	Fargo South	6-2
1994	Fargodome	Bismarck St. Mary's	Jamestown	28-19
1995	Fargodome	Fargo North	Bismarck St. Mary's	19-14
1996	Fargodome	Fargo South	Grand Forks Central	23-13

===== Class B =====
Year	Location	Champion	Runner-up	Score
1993	Fargodome	Des Lacs-Burlington	Harvey	6-0
1994	Fargodome	Minot Bishop Ryan	Grafton	42-13
1995	Fargodome	Killdeer	Harvey	30-14
1996	Fargodome	Hazen	Harvey	20-0

==== Four Class System (1997–2020) ====
===== Class AAA =====
Year	Location	Champion	Runner-up	Score
1997	Fargodome	Dickinson	Bismarck	28-26
1998	Fargodome	West Fargo	Wahpeton	12-7
1999	Fargodome	West Fargo	Minot	24-14
2000	Fargodome	Fargo North	Bismarck	43-22
2001	Fargodome	Bismarck	Fargo South	21-9
2002	Alerus Center	West Fargo	Minot	51-14
2003	Fargodome	West Fargo	Bismarck	45-21
2004	Alerus Center	Fargo South	Grand Forks Central	34-27
2005	Fargodome	Grand Forks Central	Fargo South	39-29
2006	Alerus Center	Fargo South	Minot	21-7
2007	Fargodome	Fargo South	Bismarck	40-14
2008	Alerus Center	Bismarck	Fargo South	28-19
2009	Fargodome	Bismarck	Fargo South	28-10
2010	Alerus Center	Fargo South	Bismarck	26-14
2011	Fargodome	Bismarck	Bismarck Century	21-3
2012	Alerus Center	Bismarck	Bismarck Century	21-10
2013	Fargodome	Fargo South	Bismarck	42-34
2014	Alerus Center	Fargo Davies	Minot	41-10
2015	Fargodome	Bismarck Century	Minot	28-21
2016	Fargodome	Bismarck Century	Bismarck	27-12
2017	Fargodome	West Fargo	Minot	56-28
2018	Fargodome	Bismarck	Bismarck Century	21-16
2019	Fargodome	Bismarck Century	West Fargo Sheyenne	10-0
2020	Fargodome	Bismarck Century	West Fargo Sheyenne	34-0

===== Class AA =====
Year	Location	Champion	Runner-up	Score
1997	Fargodome	Minot Bishop Ryan	Watford City	33-14
1998	Fargodome	Watford City	Rugby	42-14
1999	Fargodome	Minot Bishop Ryan	Lisbon	43-13
2000	Fargodome	Dickinson Trinity	Rugby	42-28
2001	Fargodome	Dickinson Trinity	Hazen	48-6
2002	Alerus Center	Cavalier	Dickinson Trinity	18-0
2003	Fargodome	Cavalier	Dickinson Trinity	28-7
2004	Alerus Center	Cavalier	Lisbon	36-12
2005	Fargodome	Dickinson Trinity	Beulah	21-7
2006	Alerus Center	Watford City	Dickinson Trinity	20-14
2007	Fargodome	Fargo Oak Grove	Devils Lake	28-0
2008	Alerus Center	Watford City	Valley City	40-20
2009	Fargodome	Fargo Shanley	Devils Lake	31-30 (OT)
2010	Alerus Center	Fargo Shanley	Devils Lake	24-21
2011	Fargodome	Grafton	Fargo Shanley	22-6
2012	Alerus Center	Fargo Shanley	Grafton	14-8
2013	Fargodome	Bismarck St. Mary's	Wahpeton	24-22
2014	Alerus Center	Bismarck St. Mary's	Fargo Shanley	21-7
2015	Fargodome	Beulah	Fargo Shanley	33-18
2016	Fargodome	Bismarck St. Mary's	Kindred	47-6
2017	Fargodome	Bismarck St. Mary's	Fargo Shanley	31-12
2018	Fargodome	Fargo Shanley	Bismarck St. Mary's	28-21
2019	Fargodome	Hillsboro/Central Valley	Beulah	35-12
2020	Fargodome	Bismarck St. Mary's	Beulah	17-7

===== Class A =====
Year	Location	Champion	Runner-up	Score
1997	Fargodome	Velva/Sawyer	Harvey	28-8
1998	Fargodome	Harvey	Stanley	29-12
1999	Fargodome	Stanley	Carrington	30-12
2000	Fargodome	Velva/Sawyer	Langdon	27-6
2001	Fargodome	Velva/Sawyer	Harvey	27-22
2002	Alerus Center	Stanley/Powers Lake	Carrington	20-12
2003	Fargodome	Velva/Sawyer	LaMoure/Litchville-Marion/Verona	20-13
2004	Alerus Center	Velva/Sawyer	Larimore	21-12
2005	Fargodome	Velva/Sawyer	Cavalier	33-12
2006	Alerus Center	Velva	Linton/Hazelton-Moffit-Braddock	33-8
2007	Fargodome	Harvey	Lisbon	21-18
2008	Alerus Center	Harvey	Linton/Hazelton-Moffit-Braddock	14-0
2009	Fargodome	Velva	Langdon/Munich	29-0
2010	Alerus Center	Velva	Milnor/North Sargent	25-20
2011	Fargodome	Stanley/Powers Lake	Linton/Hazelton-Moffit-Braddock	42-6
2012	Alerus Center	Hazen	Westhope/Newburg/Glenburn	55-28
2013	Fargodome	Hazen	Milnor/North Sargent	20-0
2014	Alerus Center	Park River/Fordville-Lankin	Killdeer	26-18
2015	Fargodome	Park River/Fordville-Lankin	Killdeer	38-14
2016	Fargodome	Ellendale/Edgeley/Kulm	Des Lacs-Burlington	42-20
2017	Fargodome	Hillsboro/Central Valley	Langdon Area/Edmore/Munich	16-14
2018	Fargodome	Langdon Area/Edmore/Munich	Hillsboro/Central Valley	28-20
2019	Fargodome	Langdon Area/Edmore/Munich	Bishop Ryan	42-14
2020	Fargodome	Langdon Area/Edmore/Munich	Lisbon	42-28

=== Class B 9-Man (1993–2020) ===
Year	Location	Champion	Runner-up	Score
1993	Fargodome	Sargent Central	Carson/Flasher	21-14
1994	Fargodome	Edgeley/Kulm	Rolla/Rock Lake	28-6
1995	Fargodome	New England/Regent	Thompson	30-14
1996	Fargodome	New England/Regent	Hillsboro	20-0
1997	Fargodome	New England/Regent	Rolette/Wolford	16-14
1998	Fargodome	Divide County (Crosby)	Hatton/Finley-Sharon	34-22
1999	Fargodome	Central Valley (Buxton)	Linton/Hazelton-Moffit-Braddock	40-24
2000	Fargodome	Linton/Hazelton-Moffit-Braddock	Hope-Page	30-8
2001	Fargodome	Strasburg/Zeeland	Maddock	36-8
2002	Alerus Center	Linton/Hazelton-Moffit-Braddock	Maddock	36-21
2003	Fargodome	Linton/Hazelton-Moffit-Braddock	New Rockford/Sheyenne	24-14
2004	Alerus Center	Edgeley/Kulm	New Rockford/Sheyenne	40-24
2005	Fargodome	Richland (Colfax)	Divide County (Crosby)	42-7
2006	Alerus Center	Napoleon/Gackle-Streeter	Turtle Lake-Mercer	26-12
2007	Fargodome	Mott-Regent	Napoleon/Gackle-Streeter	16-14
2008	Alerus Center	Hillsboro	Williams County (Tioga/Ray)	46-8
2009	Fargodome	Hankinson	Parshall/White Shield	27-12
2010	Alerus Center	Wyndmere/Lidgerwood	Wells County (Fessenden-Bowdon)	54-12
2011	Fargodome	Napoleon/Gackle-Streeter	North Star (Cando)	50-42
2012	Alerus Center	New Rockford-Sheyenne	Divide County (Crosby)	40-22
2013	Fargodome	Cavalier	Westhope/Newburg/Glenburn	54-6
2014	Alerus Center	Cavalier	Shiloh Christian (Bismarck)	36-6
2015	Fargodome	Richland (Colfax)	North Prairie (Rolla/Rolette/Wolford)	44-38
2016	Fargodome	Thompson	New Salem/Glen Ullin	54-20
2017	Fargodome	Wyndmere-Lidgerwood	Bismarck Shilo Christian	60-26
2018	Fargodome	Thompson	New Salem-Almont/Glen Ullin	42-28
2019	Fargodome	Kidder County	Cavalier	54-32
2020	Fargodome	Linton-HMB	Cavalier	32-24

==== Four Class System (since 2021) ====
===== Class 11AA =====
Year	Location	Champion	Runner-up	Score
2021	Fargodome	West Fargo Sheyenne	West Fargo	27-7
2022	Fargodome	Fargo Shanley	Bismarck Century	48-7
2023	Fargodome	Minot High	Fargo Shanley	38–35
2024	Fargodome	West Fargo Sheyenne	Fargo Davies	24–14
2025	Fargodome	Fargo Davies	Bismarck Century	41–19

===== Class 11A =====
Year	Location	Champion	Runner-up	Score
2021	Fargodome	Jamestown	Bismarck St. Mary's	41-27
2022	Fargodome	Jamestown	Fargo North	46-28
2023	Fargodome	Fargo North	Grand Forks Central	31-6
2024	Fargodome	West Fargo Horace	Grand Forks Red River	14–8
2025	Fargodome	Devils Lake	Minot North	39–34

===== Class 11B =====
Year	Location	Champion	Runner-up	Score
2021	Fargodome	Kindred	Hillsboro/Central Valley	37-14
2022	Fargodome	Velva/Drake/Anamoose/Garrison	Central Cass	22-20
2023	Fargodome	Kindred	Dickinson Trinity	36–7
2024	Fargodome	Velva/Drake/Anamoose/Garrison	Kindred	14–12
2025	Fargodome	Langdon Area/Munich	Bottineau	29–14

===== Class 9B =====
Year	Location	Champion	Runner-up	Score
2021	Fargodome	LaMoure-Litchville-Marion	Cavalier	42-14
2022	Fargodome	New Salem-Almont	Cavalier	28-26
2023	Fargodome	North Prairie	South Border	16–8
2024	Fargodome	New Rockford-Sheyenne	LaMoure/Litchville-Marion	62–26
2025	Fargodome	New Rockford-Sheyenne	LaMoure/Litchville-Marion	38–22
