= North Dakota High School Activities Association =

High school activities governing body

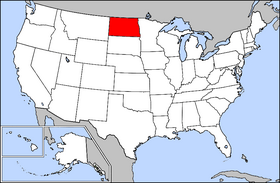
- Abbreviation: NDHSAA
- Formation: 1908
- Legal status: Association
- Purpose: Athletic/Educational
- Headquarters: 350 2nd ST NW; Valley City, North Dakota 58072 USA
- Region served: North Dakota
- Members: 171 high schools
- Executive Director: Matthew Fetsch
- Affiliations: National Federation of State High School Associations
- Staff: 8
- Website: ndhsaanow.com
- Remarks: (701) 845-3953

The North Dakota High School Activities Association (NDHSAA) is the governing body for the U.S. state of North Dakota's high-school athletics and fine arts. The current executive director of the NDHSAA is Matthew Fetsch and the headquarters are located in Valley City, North Dakota.

== History ==
In the fall of 1907 Superintendent G.W. Hanna of Valley City and invited representatives of a few other schools to a meeting in Valley City, North Dakota to discuss standardizing high school athletics in the state. A second meeting, called by Principal H.L. Rockwood of Valley City for the adoption of a constitution was held in Grand Forks on January 1 and 2, 1908 and would lead to the creation of the North Dakota High School League. 29 schools attended this meeting, but only four schools (Valley City, Jamestown, Grafton and Grand Forks) became charter members. Casselton and Hankinson joined later that school year. There was a steady growth in membership with 80 schools belonging by 1921 and 103 out of 162 classified high schools by 1925. Superintendent G.W. Hanna served as president for a first year and a half, and was succeeded by Superintendent A.G. Crane of Jamestown after the 1908–09 school year.

=== Basketball ===
From 1914 to 1932 all North Dakota High School Activities Association member high schools played basketball under a single classification. three small schools during this period won state titles: Tower City in 1915, Michigan in 1917, and Petersburg in 1919. In 1922, a number of schools from small towns organized the Consolidated League for the purpose of competing for a state championship with schools of similar enrollments. This league continued to operate through 1950. In 1933, the schools still competing under the sponsorship of the NDHSAA were divided up into Class A and Class B and, in 1948, the Class C division was created by the NDHSAA. The Consolidated League joined the Class C in 1950 and that combined organization remained in operation through 1963. From 1963 to 2023, all high school basketball teams compete in either Class B or Class A. Beginning in the 2023–24 season, a three class system was established with teams either competing in Class AA, Class A, or Class B.

== Sports offered ==
=== Football ===
Football Division in North Dakota is determined by the Male Enrollment of each School, divisions are realigned annually to reflect enrollment.

==== AAA ====
150+ and Above Male Enrollment (2025)

Institution	Location	Type	Male Enrollment	Championships	Nickname	Colors
Sheyenne High School	West Fargo, North Dakota	Public	700	2021, 2024	Mustangs	
West Fargo High School	West Fargo, North Dakota	Public	694	1998, 1999, 2002, 2003, 2017, 2023	Packers	
Davies High School	Fargo, North Dakota	Public		2014	Eagles	
Fargo North High School	Fargo, North Dakota	Public		1995, 2000, 2023	Spartans	
Shanley High School	Fargo, North Dakota	Private		2009, 2010, 2012, 2018, 2022	Deacons	
Horace High School	Horace, North Dakota	Public		2024	Hawks	
Williston High School	Williston, North Dakota	Public			Coyotes	
Bismarck High School	Bismarck, North Dakota	Public		2001, 2008, 2009, 2011, 2012, 2018	Demons	
Century High School	Bismarck, North Dakota	Public		2015,2016,2019, 2020	Patriots	
Legacy High School	Bismarck, North Dakota	Public			Sabers	
Mandan High School	Mandan, North Dakota	Public			Braves	
Minot High School	Minot, North Dakota	Public		2023	Magicians	

==== AA ====
150+ and Above Male Enrollment (2025)

Institution	Location	Type	Male Enrollment	Championships	Nickname	Colors
Grand Forks Central High School	Grand Forks, North Dakota	Public			Knights	
Red River High School	Grand Forks, North Dakota	Public			Rough Riders	
Fargo South High School	Fargo, North Dakota	Public			Bruins	
Central Cass	Casselton, North Dakota	Public			Squirrels	
St. Mary's Central High School	Bismarck, North Dakota	Private			Saints	
Wahpeton High School	Wahpeton, North Dakota	Public			Huskies	
Kindred High School	Kindred, North Dakota	Public			Vikings	
Jamestown High School	Jamestown, North Dakota	Public			Bluejays	
Watford City High School	Watford City, North Dakota	Public			Wolves	
Devils Lake High School	Devils Lake, North Dakota	Public			Firebirds	

Boys' Sports

- Baseball
- Basketball
- Cross Country
- Football
- 9 Man Football
- Golf
- Hockey
- Soccer
- Swimming & Diving
- Tennis
- Track & Field
- Wrestling

Girls' Sports

- Basketball
- Cheerleading
- Cross Country
- A Golf
- B Golf
- Gymnastics
- Hockey
- Soccer
- Softball
- Swimming & Diving
- Tennis
- Track & Field
- Volleyball
- Wrestling

== Activities ==
- Journalism
- Music
  - All-State Band
  - All-State Chorus
  - All-State Jazz Band
  - All-State Orchestra
- Region Music
- Speech
  - Debate & Individual Events
  - One-Act Play & Technical Theatre
  - Oral Interpretation
  - Student Council
  - Student Congress
- Visual Arts

== Member Schools ==
The NDHSAA is currently made up of 171 member high schools.

Member High Schools
Alexander High School Ashley High School Barnes County North High School Beach High School Belfield High School Beulah High School Bishop Ryan High School Bismarck Century High School Bismarck High School Bismarck Legacy High School Bismarck St. Mary's High School Bottineau High School Bowbells High School Bowman County High School Burke Central High School Capstone Classical Academy Carrington High School Cavalier High School Center-Stanton High School Central Cass High School Central Valley High School Dakota Adventist Academy Dakota Memorial High School Dakota Prairie High School Des Lacs-Burlington High School Devils Lake High School Dickinson High School Dickinson Trinity High School Divide County High School Drake-Anamoose High School Drayton High School Dunseith High School Edgeley High School Eight Mile School District Ellendale High School Enderlin High School Fairmount High School Fargo Davies High School Fargo North High School Fargo South High School Fessenden-Bowdon High School Finley-Sharon High School Flasher High School Fordville-Lankin High School Four Winds High School Gackle-Streeter High School Garrison High School Glen Ullin High School Glenburn High School Grafton High School Grand Forks Central High School Grand Forks Red River High School Grant County High School Grenora High School Griggs County Central High School Hankinson High School Harvey High School Hatton Eielson High School	Hazelton-Moffit-Braddock High School Hazen High School Hebron High School Hettinger High School Hillsboro High School Hope Christian Academy High School Hope-Page High School Jamestown High School Johnson Corners Christian Academy Kenmare High School Kensal High School Kidder County High School Killdeer High School Kindred High School Kulm High School Lakota High School LaMoure High School Langdon Area High School Larimore High School Leeds High School Lewis & Clark High School - Berthold Lewis & Clark North Shore-Plaza Lidgerwood High School Linton High School Lisbon High School Litchville-Marion High School Maddock High School Mandan High School Mandaree High School Maple Valley High School Max High School May-Port CG High School McClusky-Goodrich High School Medina High School Midkota High School Midway High School Milnor High School Minnewaukan High School Minot High School Minot North High School Minto High School Mohall-Lansford-Sherwood High School Montpelier High School Mott-Regent High School Munich Public School Napoleon High School Nedrose High School New England High School New Rockford-Sheyenne High School New Salem-Almont High School New Town High School Newburg High School North Border High School-Pembina North Border High School-Walhalla North Sargent High School North Star High School Northern Cass High School Northwood High School	Oak Grove High School Oakes High School Our Redeemer's High School Park River Area High School Parshall High School Pingree-Buchanan High School Powers Lake High School Ray High School Richardton-Taylor High School Richland High School Rolette High School Rolla High School Rugby High School Sargent Central High School Sawyer School School of the Holy Family - Mandan Scranton High School Selfridge High School Shanley High School Shiloh Christian High School Solen High School South Heart High School South Prairie High School St. John High School Standing Rock High School Stanley High School Starkweather High School Strasburg High School Surrey High School TGU Granville High School TGU Towner High School Thompson High School Tioga High School Turtle Lake-Mercer High School Turtle Mountain Community High School Underwood High School Valley City High School Valley-Edinburg School District Velva High School Wahpeton High School Warwick High School Washburn High School Watford City High School West Fargo High School West Fargo Horace High School West Fargo Sheyenne High School Westhope High School White Shield High School Williston High School Williston Trinity Christian High School Wilton High School Wing High School Wishek High School Wyndmere High School Zeeland High School

== Notable alumni ==
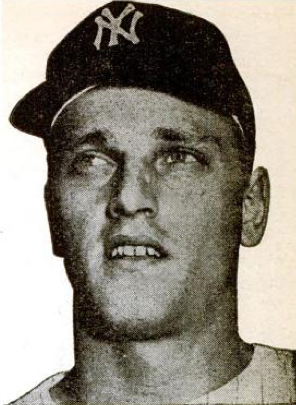
Roger Maris attended Fargo Central High School and Bishop Shanley High School in Fargo. The two time AL MVP played football and baseball for the Deacons.

- Roger Maris - Fargo Central High School and Bishop Shanley High School
- Phil Jackson - Williston High School
- Carson Wentz - Century High School
- Connor McGovern - Bishop Shanley High School
- Chris Coste - Fargo South High School
- Griffin Neal - Fargo South High School
- Laura Roesler - Fargo South High School
- Brooks Bollinger - Grand Forks Central High School
- Clifton Emmet "Cliff" Cushman - Grand Forks Central High School
- Tyler Kleven - Fargo Davies High School
- Grant Nelson - Devils Lake High School
- Darin Erstad - Jamestown High School
- Matt Strahm - West Fargo High School
- Cody Mauch - Hankinson High School
- Travis Hafner - Sykeston High School
- Rick Helling - Lakota High School and Bishop Shanley High School
- Britta Curl - Saint Mary's Central High School
- Lute Olson - Mayville High School and Grand Forks Central
- Doug Burgum - Arthur Dakota High School
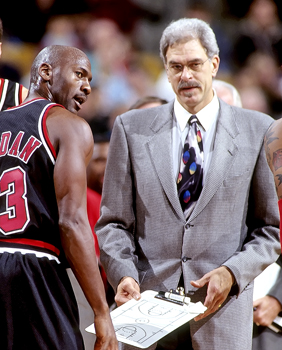
  Phil Jackson attended Williston High School. He won two NBA championships as a player for the New York Knicks and eleven NBA Championships as the head coach for the Chicago Bulls and Los Angeles Lakers.
