= List of people from Fargo, North Dakota =

The following list includes notable people who were born or have lived in Fargo, North Dakota.

== Academia ==
Name	Image	Birth	Death	Known for	Association	Reference
Nancy Friese		1948		Painter, printmaker, and educator; faculty at Rhode Island School of Design	Born in Fargo	
Kenneth Libbrecht		1958		Physicist and professor at the California Institute of Technology	Born in Fargo	

== Astronauts ==
Name	Image	Birth	Death	Known for	Association	Reference
James Buchli		June 20, 1945		United States Marine aviator; NASA astronaut; flew on four Space Shuttle missions	Graduated from Fargo Central High School	

== Media ==
Name	Image	Birth	Death	Known for	Association	Reference
Richard Edlund		Dec 6, 1940		Multiple Academy Award-winning visual effects artist for Star Wars, The Empire Strikes Back, Raiders of the Lost Ark, Return of the Jedi, and Ghostbusters	Born in Fargo	
CariDee English		Sep 23, 1984		Winner of America's Next Top Model, Cycle 7	Born in Fargo	
William H. Gass		Jul 30, 1924	Dec 6, 2017	Writer	Born in Fargo	
Chuck Klosterman		Jun 5, 1972		Author and journalist (Spin, Esquire, ESPN)	Lived in Fargo	
James Lileks		Aug 9, 1958		Writer, journalist, and blogger	Born in Fargo	
Audra Mari		Jan 8, 1994		Model, television host, and beauty pageant titleholder	Attended Davies High School in Fargo	
Carey McWilliams		Jul 5, 1973		Blind marksman and author	Born in Fargo	
Jamie Parsley		Dec 8, 1969		Poet	Born in Fargo	
Amber Preston				Stand-up comedian	Born in Fargo; 1996 graduate of West Fargo High School	
Adam Quesnell				Stand-up comedian	Lived in Fargo	
Kristin Rudrüd		May 23, 1955		Actress, known for starring in the films Fargo and Pleasantville	Born in Fargo	
Roxana Saberi		Apr 26, 1977		Journalist, 1997 Miss North Dakota	Worked at KVLY-TV	
Ed Schultz		Jan 27, 1954	Jul 5, 2018	Host of The Ed Show, a weekday news talk program, and The Ed Schultz Show, a talk radio show	Worked at KTHI-TV, WDAY-TV, and KFGO in Fargo	
Ari Shapiro		Sep 30, 1978		Reporter (NPR)	Born in Fargo	
Jon L. Wanzek		May 10, 1964		Film producer	Lives in Fargo	

== Musicians and singers ==
Name	Image	Birth	Death	Known for	Association	Reference
The Blenders				Vocal quartet		
Virginia Bruce		Sep 29, 1910	Feb 24, 1982	Singer and actress, starred in such films as Born to Dance and The Great Ziegfeld	Grew up in Fargo	
Shannon Curfman		Jul 31, 1985		Blues guitarist and singer	Born in Fargo	
Johnny Holm				Singer	Born in Fargo	
Dakota Dave Hull		Apr 19, 1950		Acoustic fingerstyle guitarist and music historian	Born in Fargo	
Jonny Lang		Jan 29, 1981		Blues guitarist and singer	Born in Fargo	
Peter Schickele		Jul 17, 1935	Jan 16, 2024	Musical composer (alter ego of PDQ Bach)		
Frank Scott		Jul 21, 1921	Oct 5, 1995	Musician and arranger with the Lawrence Welk orchestra	Born in Fargo	
Bobby Vee		Apr 30, 1943	Oct 24, 2016	1960s era pop music singer	Born in Fargo	

== Sports ==
Name	Image	Birth	Death	Known for	Association	Reference
Dan Arnold		Mar 15, 1996		Tight end for the New Orleans Saints 2017–2019, Arizona Cardinals 2019–2020, Carolina Panthers 2021–2021, Jacksonville Jaguars 2021-2022, Philadelphia Eagles 2023-2023; free agent 2023-present	Played football at Shanley High School in Fargo	
Jackson Blake		Aug 3, 2003		Right winger for the Carolina Hurricanes in the NHL	Born in Fargo; played hockey at the University of North Dakota in Grand Forks	
Henry Luke Bolley		Feb 1, 1865	Nov 9, 1956	First North Dakota State University football coach; plant pathologist	Lived and died in Fargo	
Jim Brandt		May 19, 1929		NFL and CFL player	Born in Fargo	
Joe Burrow		Dec 10, 1996		Quarterback for the LSU, 2019 Heisman Trophy winner, 2019–2020 College Football National Champion, NFL Pick No.1, quarterback for the Cincinnati Bengals	Attended Centennial Elementary School while his father was on the coaching staff for the NDSU Bison	
Joe Cichy		May 12, 1948		Safety for the North Dakota State Bison football team and inductee to the College Football Hall of Fame	Born in Fargo and played football at Shanley High School in Fargo	
Chris Coste		Feb 4, 1973		Major League Baseball catcher	Born in Fargo	
Kyle Emanuel		Aug 16, 1991		NFL linebacker for the Los Angeles Chargers 2015–2019	Played football at North Dakota State University in Fargo, host of NDSU Bison Football Pregame Show on KVLY-TV	
Paul Gaustad		Feb 3, 1982		Center for the Nashville Predators	Born in Fargo	
Andy Heck		Jan 1, 1967		Offensive line coach and player for the Kansas City Chiefs	Born in Fargo	
Gary Larsen		Mar 13, 1942		Defensive tackle for the Minnesota Vikings' Purple People Eaters	Born in Fargo	
Roger Maris		Sep 10, 1934	Dec 14, 1985	Outfielder for the Cleveland Indians, Kansas City Athletics, New York Yankees and St. Louis Cardinals; American League Most Valuable Player in 1960 and 1961	Raised in Fargo and graduate of Shanley High School	
Connor McGovern		Apr 27, 1993		Center for the Denver Broncos 2016–2019, center for the New York Jets 2020–present	Played football at Shanley High School in Fargo	
John Noah		Nov 21, 1927	Sep 3, 2015	Silver medalist at the 1952 Winter Olympics	Lived and died in Fargo	
Donny Schatz		Aug 10, 1977		Driver for the World of Outlaws		
Easton Stick		Sep 15, 1995		Quarterback for the Los Angeles Chargers, No.166 overall NFL draft pick	Played football at North Dakota State University in Fargo	
Erik Swanson	Sep 4, 1993			Relief pitcher for the Toronto Blue Jays, formerly played for the Seattle Mariners		
William Turner		Oct 17, 1991		NFL guard who is a free agent	Played football at North Dakota State University in Fargo	
Carson Wentz		Dec 30, 1992		Quarterback for the Kansas City Chiefs, No.2 overall NFL draft pick by the Philadelphia Eagles, Super Bowl Champion (LII)	Played football at North Dakota State University in Fargo	

== Statesmen (religious and political) ==
Name	Image	Birth	Death	Known for	Association	Reference
Doug Burgum		Aug 1, 1956		55th United States Secretary of the Interior (2025-present); 33rd governor of North Dakota (2016–2024); candidate for president in 2024	Graduate of North Dakota State University, lived in Fargo	
Ronald N. Davies		Dec 11, 1904	Apr 18, 1996	Federal judge for the district of North Dakota (1955–1985)	Lived and died in Fargo	
Leo Ferdinand Dworschak		Apr 6, 1900	Nov 5, 1976	Roman Catholic bishop of Fargo		
Aloisius Joseph Muench		Feb 18, 1889	Feb 15, 1962	Roman Catholic bishop of Fargo		
Collin Peterson		Jun 29, 1944		US congressman from Minnesota	Born in Fargo	
Ed Schafer		Aug 8, 1946		30th governor of North Dakota (1992–2000), 29th United States Secretary of Agriculture under George W. Bush	Lives in Fargo	
George A. Sinner		May 29, 1928	Mar 9, 2018	29th governor of North Dakota (1985–1992)	Born in Fargo	
Burleigh F. Spalding		Dec 3, 1853	Mar 17, 1934	US congressman	Lived and died in Fargo	
Evan S. Tyler		Mar 22, 1843	Aug 24, 1923	North Dakota state congressman	Lived and died in Fargo	

== Other ==
Name	Image	Birth	Death	Known for	Association	Reference
Sara Jane Olson		Jan 16, 1947		Far-left activist	Born in Fargo	
Salvador Rolando Ramos		May 16, 2004	May 24, 2022	Uvalde school shooting	Born in Fargo	
