= Napoleon High School =

Napoleon High School may refer to high schools in the following locations:

- Napoleon High School (Michigan), Napoleon, Michigan
- Napoleon High School (Napoleon, North Dakota), Napoleon, North Dakota
- Napoleon High School (Ohio), Napoleon, Ohio
