= Mike Peluso =

Mike Peluso may refer to:

- Mike Peluso (ice hockey, born 1965), American ice hockey forward with 458 NHL games
- Mike Peluso (ice hockey, born 1974), American ice hockey right winger with 38 NHL games
