= Connor McGovern =

Connor McGovern may refer to:

- Connor McGovern (American football, born 1993), center for the Denver Broncos and New York Jets
- Connor McGovern (American football, born 1997), guard for the Dallas Cowboys and center for Buffalo Bills
