= Gregory Rohde =

American former government official (born 1961)

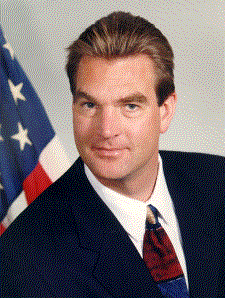

Assistant Secretary of Commerce for Communications and Information; Administrator of the National Telecommunications and Information Administration
- In office 1999–2001
- President: Bill Clinton
- Preceded by: Larry Irving
- Succeeded by: Nancy J. Victory

Personal details
- Born: Gregory Lewis Rohde; November 7, 1961 (age 64) Pierre, South Dakota, U.S.
- Education: University of Colorado Boulder; North Dakota State University; Catholic University of America

Gregory Lewis Rohde (born November 7, 1961) is an American former government official who served as the Assistant Secretary for Communications and Information at the United States Department of Commerce, and Administrator of the National Telecommunications and Information Administration during the administration of President Bill Clinton. Following his role in the Clinton Administration, Rohde founded e-Copernicus, a lobbying firm based in Washington, D.C.

== Early life and education ==
Rohde was born on November 7, 1961, in Pierre, South Dakota. He graduated from Century High School in Bismarck, North Dakota in 1980 and attended the University of Colorado Boulder and North Dakota State University on a track and cross-country scholarship. He received a Bachelor of Science in education with majors in Philosophy and Sociology from North Dakota State University in 1985 and a Bachelor of Sacred Theology from the Catholic University of America in 1988.

== Career ==
=== Early career ===
Rohde began his career as an educator, teaching social justice classes at a Catholic High School in Washington, D.C. He was active in politics, and was the campaign manager for Nicholas Spaeth's 1992 race for Governor of North Dakota.

During the Presidential transition of Bill Clinton, Rohde, served as a Team Coordinator for the Health Care Financing Administration section of the Clinton-Gore Transition Team.

He worked as a longtime senior aide and advisor to U.S. Senator Byron Dorgan, where he handled matters before the United States Senate Committee on Commerce, Science, and Transportation. Rohde contributed to the Telecommunications Act of 1996 and the Internet Tax Freedom Act.

=== Clinton administration ===
In August 1999, Rohde was nominated by President Clinton as Assistant Secretary for Communications and Information at the Department of Commerce, and Administrator of the National Telecommunications and Information Administration. He was confirmed by the U.S. Senate in November 1999.

In the role, he served as the chief advisor to the President on communications and information policy, representing the Executive Branch before governmental and private stakeholders. Rohde also directed the Critical Information Infrastructure Assurance Program, which was the U.S. government's first major cybersecurity initiative pre-9/11. Rohde also served as the Administration's liaison to the technology and information industries on the President's Critical Infrastructure Protection initiative. Rohde was also a member of the COPA Commission, a congressionally appointed panel that was mandated by the Child Online Protection Act.

=== Post-administration ===
After his government service, Rohde founded e-Copernicus, a lobbying firm based in Washington, D.C. In 2003, he was the founding executive director of the NG 9-1-1 Institute. Rohde also serves on the board of directors of Enough Is Enough.
