= Andrew Young (baseball) =

American baseball player (born 1994)

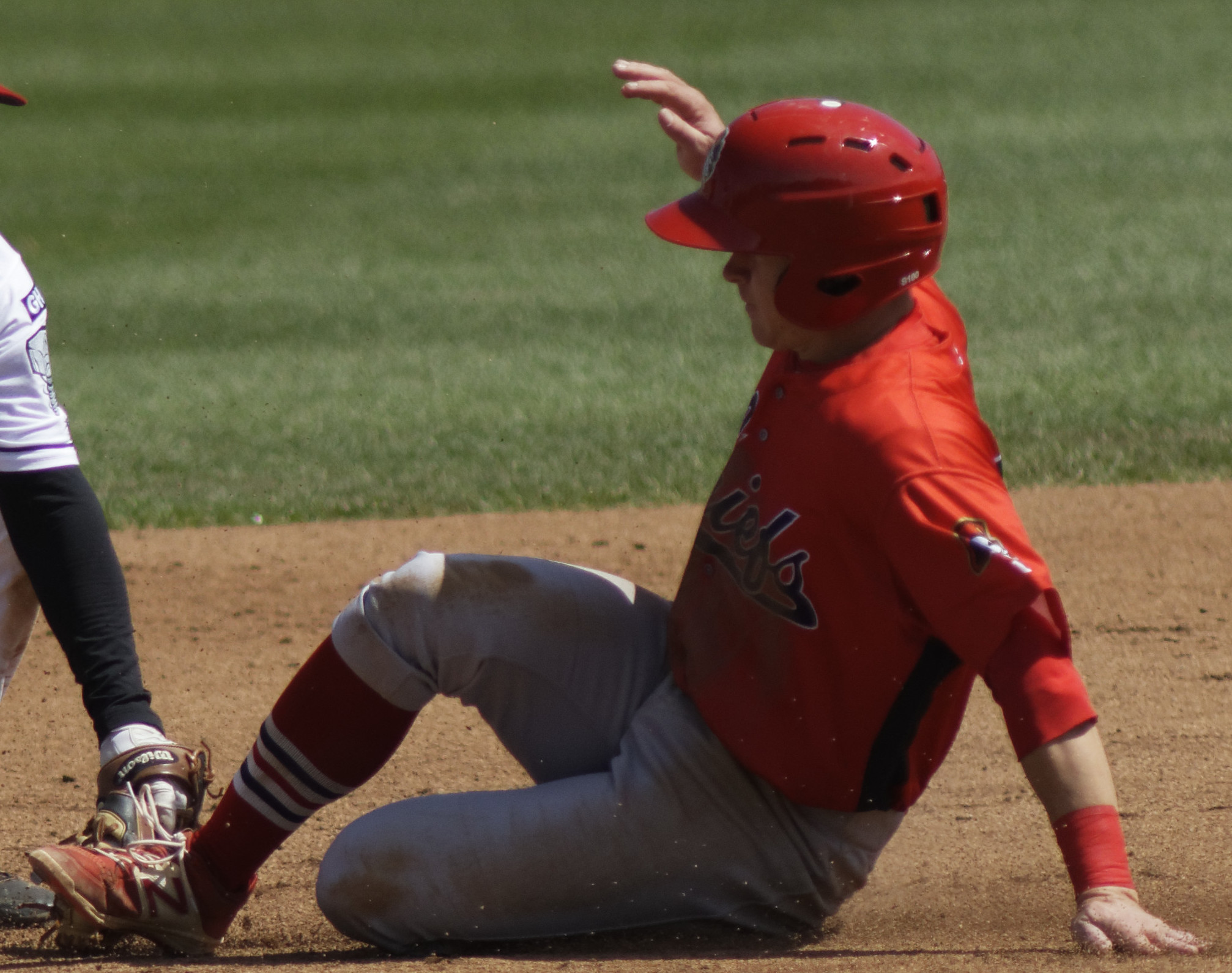
- Young with the Peoria Chiefs in 2017

Piratas de Campeche – No. 3
- Infielder
- Born: May 10, 1994 (age 32); West Fargo, North Dakota, U.S.
- Bats: Right Throws: Right

MLB debut
- August 1, 2020, for the Arizona Diamondbacks

MLB statistics (through 2021 season)
- Batting average: .205
- Home runs: 7
- Runs batted in: 19
- Stats at Baseball Reference

Teams
- Arizona Diamondbacks (2020–2021)

Andrew Jacob Young (born May 10, 1994) is an American professional baseball infielder for the Piratas de Campeche of the Mexican League. He played in Major League Baseball (MLB) for the Arizona Diamondbacks.

== Amateur career ==
Young attended West Fargo High School in West Fargo, North Dakota. As a senior in 2012, he was named the North Dakota Gatorade Baseball Player of the Year after he batted .389 with six home runs and 38 RBIs alongside pitching to a 5–0 record with a 1.47 ERA. Undrafted out of high school in the 2012 Major League Baseball draft, he enrolled at the University of Jamestown to play college baseball. After his freshman year, he transferred to Neosho County Community College. Following his sophomore season at Neosho, Young enrolled at Indiana State University. In 2015, as a junior at Indiana State, he batted .296 with seven home runs and 42 RBIs in 54 games and was awarded Missouri Valley Conference Honorable Mention. As a senior in 2016, Young slashed .299/.414/.480 with six home runs and 34 RBIs in 56 games, earning himself a spot on the Missouri Valley Conference Second Team. After his senior year, he was selected by the St. Louis Cardinals in the 37th round of the 2016 Major League Baseball draft.

== Professional career ==
=== St. Louis Cardinals ===
Young signed with St. Louis for $3,000 and made his professional debut with the Gulf Coast League Cardinals before receiving a promotion to the State College Spikes. In 53 games between the two clubs, he batted .271 with three home runs and 24 RBIs. He began 2017 with the Peoria Chiefs and was named to the Midwest League All-Star Game along with being invited to participate in the Home Run Derby. After batting .284 with 12 home runs and 38 RBIs in 58 games with Peoria, he was promoted to the Palm Beach Cardinals in June. In 57 games for Palm Beach, Young slashed .265/.327/.388 with five home runs and twenty RBIs. He also played in two games for the Springfield Cardinals at the end of the season. Young began 2018 with Palm Beach, with whom he was named a Florida State League All-Star and represented in the Home Run Derby, and was promoted to Springfield in July. In 119 games between the two clubs, he slashed .289/.379/.479 with 21 home runs and 58 RBIs. After the season, he played for the Surprise Saguaros of the Arizona Fall League.

=== Arizona Diamondbacks ===
On December 5, 2018, the Cardinals traded Young, Luke Weaver, Carson Kelly, and a draft pick to the Arizona Diamondbacks for Paul Goldschmidt.

Young was assigned to the Jackson Generals to open the 2019 season, slashing .260/.363/.453 with eight home runs and 28 RBIs over 65 games. He was promoted to the Reno Aces on June 16 and finished the year there. Over 68 games with Reno, Young batted .280 with 21 home runs and 53 RBIs. Young was added to the Diamondbacks 40–man roster following the 2019 season.

Young made his major league debut on August 1, 2020, vs. the Los Angeles Dodgers, replacing Ketel Marte in the top of the 9th inning. He hit his first career home run on August 9, 2020, against the San Diego Padres. He had 26 at-bats in 2020, batting .192. In 2021, Young appeared in 58 games for the Diamondbacks, slashing .209/.298/.484 with six home runs, 15 RBIs, and seven doubles over 91 at-bats. When not with the major league club, Young played with Reno, batting .304 with 11 home runs and 41 RBIs over 48 games. On November 30, 2021, the Diamondbacks outrighted Young off of their 40-man roster.

=== Washington Nationals ===
On December 8, 2021, the Washington Nationals selected Young from the Diamondbacks in the minor league phase of the Rule 5 draft. Following spring training, the Nationals assigned Young to the Triple-A Rochester Red Wings. In 92 games split between Rochester and the Double-A Harrisburg Senators, he slashed .211/.320/.387 with 14 home runs and 40 RBI. Young elected free agency following the season on November 10, 2022.

=== Piratas de Campeche ===
On February 21, 2026, after several years of inactivity and a year of coaching, Young came out of retirement and was announced as a spring training invitee for the Piratas de Campeche of the Mexican League. He officially signed with the team on April 14.

== Coaching career ==
In 2025, Young served as an assistant baseball coach at Concordia College.

== See also ==
- Rule 5 draft results
