= Roseglen, North Dakota =

- Unincorporated community
- Location within North Dakota Location within the United States
- Coordinates: 47°45′5″N 101°50′11″W
- Country: United States
- State: North Dakota
- County: McLean
- Elevation: 2,100 ft (640 m)
- Time zone: UTC-6 (Central (CST))
  - Summer (DST): UTC-5 (CDT)
- ZIP codes: 58775
- Area code: 701
- GNIS feature ID: 1030991

Roseglen is an unincorporated community in northwestern McLean County, North Dakota, United States. It lies along North Dakota Highway 37 northwest of the city of Washburn, the county seat of McLean County. Its elevation is 2,100 feet (640 m). Roseglen Township is served by the White Shield School District, which operates a K-12 public school program from one campus in Roseglen.
