= St. Mary's Central High School =

Location
- 5802 Ridgeland Dr; Bismarck, North Dakota 58503; United States

Information
- Other name: SMCHS
- Type: Private high school
- Religious affiliation: Roman Catholic
- Established: 1878
- School district: Light of Christ Catholic Schools
- Oversight: Roman Catholic Diocese of Bismarck
- NCES School ID: 01042651
- Principal: Connor Doll
- Teaching staff: 20.8 (on an FTE basis)
- Grades: 9–12
- Gender: Co-educational
- Enrollment: 336 (2021-2022)
- Student to teacher ratio: 16.2
- Colors: Blue and white
- Athletics conference: North Dakota High School Activities Association
- Nickname: Saints
- Newspaper: SM Messenger
- Website: www.smchs.org

St. Mary's Central High School (SMCHS) is a private, Roman Catholic, co-educational high school in Bismarck, North Dakota, United States. It is part of the Light of Christ Catholic Schools district and is located in the Roman Catholic Diocese of Bismarck.

Originally at 1025 North 2nd Street, it moved to a new campus in the far north of the metro area in 2019. The previous campus is now St. Mary's Academy, a dedicated middle school (grades 6–8).

== History ==
In 1878, four religious sisters from the convent of St. Benedict in St. Joseph, Minnesota, arrived in Bismarck to staff what was then the St. Mary's Academy and Boarding School. In 1916, the first high school classes were offered and the Spring of 1922 produced the first graduating class at St. Mary's High School.

In 1951, a new school campus was built at 1025 N 2nd Street and called St. Mary's Central High School. For 68 years, this campus was home to high school students. The final graduating class was the Class of 2019.

In Augusts of 2019, a new campus was opened for SMCHS in North Bismarck. Located at 5802 Ridgeland Drive, this new state-of-the-art campus features four centers: St. Thomas Aquinas Academic Center, Athletic Center, Our Lady of Victory Chapel and the Myron Atkinson and T. Clem Casey Fine Arts Center.

In the Fall of 2013, St. Mary's Academy was established as a middle school in the basement of the high school building. The middle school still resides in the 1025 N 2nd Street campus.

== Athletics and activities ==
=== Varsity sports ===
SMCHS currently sponsors 24 varsity sports with 12 of them being co-ops with surrounding Bismarck and Mandan high schools.

SMCHS also has a co-op which allows students from the School of the Holy Family in Mandan, North Dakota to participate in sports and activities at SMCHS.

SMCHS is a member of the North Dakota High School Activities Association (NDHSAA) and the Western Dakota Association (WDA)

==== Boys sports ====
- Cross Country (Co-op: Bismarck, Century, Legacy)
- Football
- Soccer (Co-op: Mandan)
- Tennis (Co-op: Bismarck, Century, Legacy)
- Basketball
- Ice Hockey (Co-op: Bismarck)
- Swimming and Diving (Co-op: Bismarck, Century, Legacy)
- Wrestling
- Golf
- Track and Field

==== Girls sports ====
- Cross Country (Co-op: Bismarck, Century, Legacy)
- Golf
- Swimming and Diving (Co-op: Bismarck, Century, Legacy)
- Ice Hockey (Co-op: Century)
- Wrestling (Co-op: Bismarck, Century, Legacy)
- Soccer
- Softball (Co-op: Bismarck, Century, Legacy)
- Tennis
- Track and Field
- Cheerleading

=== Activities ===
SMCHS has 7 different competitive activities which students can participate in under the NDHSAA.

- Debate (Co-op: Bismarck)
- Band
- Orchestra (Co-op: Century)
- Choir
- Play
- Speech
- Student Congress

Along with these activities SMCHS also offers Jazz Band, Steel Drum Band, Jazz Choir, Science Olympiad, Knights of Virtue, Leo Lions, SM Messenger, Vera Forma, Assistant Chaplains, Science Club, Robotics Club, Student Council, Art Club, Catholic Athletes for Christ, National Honor Society, Future Business Leaders of America (FBLA), and many others.

Steel Drum Band is unique as SMCHS is the only high school in the state of North Dakota with a steel drum band. Students are given the rare opportunity to perform music on steelpan instruments which trace their origins to Trinidad and Tobago and the Caribbean.

=== Championships ===
- State Class 'A' boys' Basketball: 1951, 1972, 2004
- State Class 'A' Football: 1951, 1959, 1988, 1991, 1994
- State Class 'AA' Football: 2013, 2014, 2016, 2017, 2020
- State Class 'A' Boys' Wrestling Team: 1964
- State Class 'A' Girls' Golf: 2016
- State Class 'A' Speech: 1996, 2011, 2012, 2013, 2014, 2015

== Notable alumni ==
- Britta Curl, Current professional hockey player for PWHL Minnesota and member of 2026 Winter Olympics USA Women's Hockey gold medal-winning team
- Tim Olson, Former Major League Baseball Player for the Diamondbacks (2004) and Rockies (2005)
- Dave St. Peter, Current President and CEO of the Minnesota Twins
