= New Rockford-Sheyenne Public School =

Coordinates: 47.681723°N 99.131277°W

Sheyenne Public School

Location
- 437 1st Avenue North; New Rockford, North Dakota 58356; United States

Information
- Type: Public
- School district: New Rockford-Sheyenne Public School District
- Superintendent: Jill Louters
- Principal: Avolt Baumbach (High school)
- Faculty: 30
- Grades: K-12
- Average class size: 25
- Colors: Columbia blue and gold
- Mascot: Rockets
- Newspaper: None
- Yearbook: The Dial
- Website: New Rockford-Sheyenne Public School website

New Rockford-Sheyenne Public School is a public elementary school and high school located in New Rockford, North Dakota.

== District ==
New Rockford-Sheyenne Public School District is a school district of the publicly funded school serving the cities of New Rockford, and Sheyenne, and the surrounding rural areas. The district administration offices are in New Rockford.

== Extracurricular activities ==
- Dial
- Family, Career, and Community Leaders of America
- Future Business Leaders of America (FBLA)
- One-Act Play
- Band and Choir
- SADD
- National Honor Society
- Speech
- Student Council

== Athletics ==
The athletic teams are known as the Rockets.

- Baseball (Sheyenne/New Rockford Black Sox)
- Basketball (boys' and girls')
- Football
- Track and Field (boys' and girls')
- Volleyball
- Wrestling^{1: This sport is joined with Carrington High School.}

=== Championships ===
- State Class 'B' boys' track and field: 1961, 1971
- State 9-Man football: 2012 2024 2025
- State Class 'B' boys' basketball: 2003 sixth place, 2004 fifth place, 2005 Champions
- State Class 'B' girls' basketball: 2009 fourth place

== Notable people ==
=== Former staff ===
- Joan Heckaman - North Dakota Senator

=== Former students and alumni ===
- Tracy Weber - journalist
