= Oak Grove Lutheran School =

Coordinates: 46.882899°N 96.772513°W

- Fargo, North Dakota; USA

Information
- Type: Private
- Established: 1906; 120 years ago
- Grades: Pre-K through grade 12
- Enrollment: 524
- Colors: Maroon and white
- Mascot: Grovers

Oak Grove Lutheran School is a private, Lutheran school for students in pre-Kindergarten through grade 12 in Fargo, North Dakota. It was founded in 1906. Oak Grove began as school that housed mostly Norwegian schoolgirls.

== History ==
In March 2009, the permanent dike surrounding the school was breached by the Red River, causing the school to relocate operations for the remainder of the school year.

== Athletics ==
Oak Grove competes in the North Dakota High School Activities Association. Oak Grove offers baseball, basketball, golf, track and field, and volleyball. In conjunction with other Fargo schools, it also offers softball, cross country, ice hockey, soccer, swimming and diving, tennis, wrestling, and gymnastics.

== Fine arts ==
Oak Grove students begin participating in music programs in elementary school. Students participate in choirs K-12. Elementary students can perform in the choir squad alongside their general music classes. Starting in 5th grade, students can participate in school bands. Middle school has both a general choir and an auditioned honor choir, and high school specialty choirs include concert choir, chapel choir, madrigals, and carolers.

== Activities ==
The Oak Grove Lutheran School chess team is open to anyone in grades 1-12 and is active in the fall, winter and spring. The speech team is active in the winter and spring and open to students in grades 7–12.
