= Griffin Neal =

American football quarterback

Profile
- Position: Quarterback

Personal information
- Born: Fargo, North Dakota, U.S.
- Listed height: 6 ft 4 in (1.93 m)
- Listed weight: 220 lb (100 kg)

Career information
- High school: Fargo South
- College: Concordia (MN)
- NFL draft: 2015: undrafted

Career history
- Hildesheim Invaders (2015); New Orleans Saints (2016)*
- * Offseason or practice squad member only
- Stats at Pro Football Reference

Griffin Neal is an American former professional football quarterback. He attended Fargo South High School, then went to Concordia College, an NCAA Division III school in nearby Moorhead, Minnesota, where he started at quarterback for three years and became the school's all-time leader in passing yards (5,614) and touchdown passes (47).

== Career ==
=== Hildesheim Invaders ===
Neal was signed and played professionally in 2015 for the Hildesheim Invaders, one of 16 teams playing at the second highest level in Germany, the German Football League 2.

=== New Orleans Saints ===
After the season in Germany, Neal was invited to Tulane's pro day, he caught the attention of New Orleans Saints executives, who gave him a second tryout and signed him to a contract on April 9, 2016. Neal was waived by the Saints on May 16.
