= Bismarck Public Schools =

School district in North Dakota, United States

Coordinates: 46.813563°N 100.794915°W

Location
- 806 North Washington Street Bismarck, Burleigh County, North Dakota

District information
- Type: Public
- Motto: Empower every learner to thrive.
- Grades: Pre K-12
- Established: 1874
- Superintendent: Jeff Fastnacht
- School board: Bismarck School Board
- Schools: 29
- NCES District ID: 3800014

Students and staff
- Teachers: 1,100
- Staff: 2,168
- Student–teacher ratio: 12.25

Other information
- Website: www.bismarckschools.org

Bismarck Public Schools (BPS) is a system of publicly funded K-12 schools in Bismarck, North Dakota. There are eighteen elementary schools, three middle schools, and three high schools. BPS also operates an alternative high school, a vocational center, and an early childhood program.

The district includes Bismarck, Apple Valley, and Lincoln.

== Schools ==
=== Elementary schools ===
- Centennial Elementary School (Roughriders)
- Elk Ridge Elementary School (Explorers)
- Grimsrud Elementary School (Grizzlies)
- Highland Acres Elementary School (Hawks)
- Liberty Elementary School (Rockets)
- Lincoln Elementary School (Lightning)- Located in Lincoln, North Dakota
- Miller Elementary School (Magicians)
- Moses Elementary School (Stars)
- Murphy Elementary School (Bulldogs)
- Myhre Elementary School (Mustangs)
- Northridge Elementary School (Superstars)
- Pioneer Elementary School (Panthers)
- Prairie Rose Elementary School (Panthers)
- Roosevelt Elementary School (Roughriders)
- Silver Ranch Elementary School (Stampede)
- Solheim Elementary School (Cougars)
- Sunrise Elementary School (Lions)
- Will-Moore Elementary School (Wildcats)

=== Middle schools ===
- Horizon Middle School (Huskies)
- Simle Middle School (Spartans)
- Wachter Middle School (Wildcats)

=== High schools ===
- Bismarck High School (Demons)
- Century High School (Patriots)
- Legacy High School (Sabers)
- South Central High School (Phoenix) (alternative high school)

=== Programs ===
- Adult Learning Center
- Bismarck Early Childhood Education Program (becep)(Bees)
- Career Academy & Technical Center
- Renew[Ed]
