= Dan Arnold (American football) =

American football player and coach (born 1995)

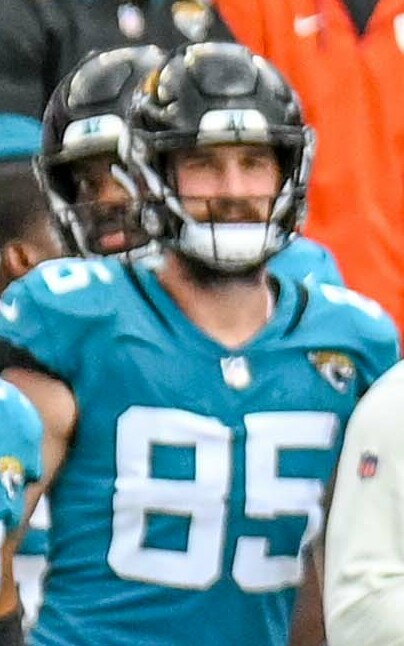
- Arnold with the Jacksonville Jaguars in 2022

Wisconsin–Platteville Pioneers
- Title: Quarterbacks coach & passing game coordinator

Personal information
- Born: March 15, 1995 (age 31); Milwaukee, Wisconsin, U.S.
- Listed height: 6 ft 6 in (1.98 m)
- Listed weight: 240 lb (109 kg)

Career information
- Position: Tight end (No. 85, 82)
- High school: Shanley (Fargo, North Dakota)
- College: UW–Platteville (2013–2016)
- NFL draft: 2017: undrafted

Career history

Playing
- New Orleans Saints (2017–2019); Arizona Cardinals (2019–2020); Carolina Panthers (2021); Jacksonville Jaguars (2021–2022); Philadelphia Eagles (2023)*
- * Offseason or practice squad member only

Coaching
- Wisconsin–Platteville (2025) Special teams coordinator & tight ends coach; Wisconsin–Platteville (2026–present) Quarterbacks coach & passing game coordinator

Career NFL statistics
- Receptions: 95
- Receiving yards: 1,258
- Receiving touchdowns: 7
- Stats at Pro Football Reference

Daniel Lewis Arnold (born March 15, 1995) is an American college football coach and former professional football tight end. He is the quarterbacks coach and passing game coordinator for the University of Wisconsin–Platteville, positions he has held since 2026. He has previously played in the National Football League (NFL) for the New Orleans Saints, Arizona Cardinals, Carolina Panthers, and Jacksonville Jaguars. He played college football and ran track at Wisconsin-Platteville.

== Early life ==
Arnold was born in Milwaukee, Wisconsin and raised in Janesville, Wisconsin, but attended school in Rockford, Illinois as his mother was a teacher at Boylan Catholic High School. He attended Boylan Catholic for three years before his family moved to North Dakota. He then attended Shanley High School in Fargo, North Dakota. Arnold attended college at University of Wisconsin-Platteville where he competed in the 110m hurdles. Arnold came second in the Division 3 110m hurdle championship, where he ran faster than Conor Murtagh, who finished in 3rd and Jacek Pikul who finished 6th.

== Professional career ==
Pre-draft measurables
Height	Weight	Arm length	Hand span	40-yard dash	10-yard split	20-yard split	20-yard shuttle	Three-cone drill	Vertical jump	Broad jump	Bench press
6 ft 4 7/8 in (1.95 m)	222 lb (101 kg)	32 1/8 in (0.82 m)	9 5/8 in (0.24 m)	4.63 s	1.60 s	2.62 s	4.30 s	6.81 s	39.5 in (1.00 m)	10 ft 7 in (3.23 m)	12 reps
All values from Pro Day

=== New Orleans Saints ===
Arnold went undrafted in the 2017 NFL draft, but received invitations to attend rookie minicamp and tryout for the Kansas City Chiefs and New Orleans Saints. On June 5, 2017, the Saints signed Arnold to a three-year, $1.66 million contract. On June 16, the Saints placed Arnold on injured reserve due to an unspecified injury. Arnold was initially waived/injured, but was placed on injured reserve after clearing waivers.

On July 26, 2018, it was reported that the New Orleans Saints' coaching staff had elected to move Arnold from wide receiver to tight end. Arnold was moved in order for him to have a better chance of making the roster. The move was partly due to the release of tight end Coby Fleener, leaving the a lack of depth at the position. Assistant head coach/tight ends coach Dan Campbell oversaw Arnold's transition to tight end and Arnold credits him with his success at tight end.

Throughout training camp, Arnold competed to be the third tight end on the depth chart against Michael Hoomanawanui, John Phillips, Garrett Griffin, and Deon Yelder. Arnold impressed the coaches with his ability during training camp and made the active 53-man roster. Head coach Sean Payton named Arnold the third tight end on the Saints' depth chart to begin the regular season, behind veterans Benjamin Watson and Josh Hill.

Arnold was inactive for the first four regular season games (Weeks 1–4) as a healthy scratch. On October 8, 2018, he made his NFL debut during the Saints' 43–19 win against the Washington Redskins in Week 5. In Week 7, he made his first career reception, a ten-yard reception from Saints' quarterback Drew Brees during the second quarter of a 24–23 win at the Baltimore Ravens. He finished the game with two receptions for 35 yards. On November 11, Arnold earned his first career start and made two receptions for 25 yards as the Saints defeated the Cincinnati Bengals 51–14 in Week 10. On November 22, Arnold scored his first touchdown against the Atlanta Falcons on a 25-yard reception. He appeared in ten games and started one in the 2018 season. Arnold finished with 12 receptions for 150 yards and a touchdown.

On August 31, 2019, Arnold was waived by the Saints and was re-signed to the practice squad the next day. He was promoted to the active roster on October 19. On December 4, Arnold was waived by the Saints.

=== Arizona Cardinals ===
On December 5, 2019, Arnold was claimed off waivers by the Arizona Cardinals. He finished the 2019 season with eight receptions for 127 yards and two touchdowns.

In Week 13 of the 2020 season against the Los Angeles Rams, Arnold recorded two catches for 61 yards that both resulted in touchdowns during the 38–28 loss. In the 2020 season, he appeared in 16 games and started five. He recorded 31 receptions for 438 receiving yards and four receiving touchdowns.

=== Carolina Panthers ===
On March 19, 2021, Arnold signed a two-year contract with the Carolina Panthers.

=== Jacksonville Jaguars ===
On September 27, 2021, Arnold was traded to the Jacksonville Jaguars along with a 2022 third-round pick in exchange for cornerback C. J. Henderson and a 2022 fifth-round pick. He suffered a sprained MCL in Week 12 and was placed on injured reserve on November 30. In the 2021 season, he appeared in 11 games and started four. He had 35 receptions for 408 yards.

In the 2022 season, Arnold appeared in all 17 regular season games and both playoff games for the Jaguars. He had nine receptions for 135 yards.

=== Philadelphia Eagles ===
Arnold was signed by the Philadelphia Eagles on May 4, 2023. He was released on August 27 as part of final roster cuts before the start of the season.
