= Des Lacs-Burlington High School =

Address
- 317 Roosevelt St. Des Lacs, North Dakota 58733; U.S.
- Coordinates: 48.255254°N 101.561166°W

Information
- Type: Public
- Established: 1965
- School district: United Public School District 7
- Teaching staff: 23.44 (on an FTE basis)
- Grades: 7–12
- Enrollment: 304 (2023–2024)
- Student to teacher ratio: 12.97
- Color(s): red, blue, and white
- Athletics: NDHSAA Class 'B' (Football: Class 'A')
- Website: School website

Location in North Dakota

Des Lacs-Burlington High School (DLBHS) is a public high school in Des Lacs, North Dakota that serves students in Burlington as well as Des Lacs. It is part of the United Public School District 7 and was formed from a merger between both of the towns school districts in the late 1960s. Des Lacs-Burlington High School students attend grades K-6 at Burlington-Des Lacs Elementary School in Burlington, and grades 7–12 at DLBHS.

== History ==
The school was formed by a merger of Des Lacs and Burlington High Schools in 1965. Originally, students in grades 7 and 8 attended DLBHS; this changed in 2000 with the addition of a junior high wing at BDLE. In 2017 an education referendum approved funding for the construction of a junior high school wing at DLBHS. The expansion included a new gymnasium and cafeteria, and was in use by April 2019. The former junior high wing at BDLE was converted into a Kindergarten and office space wing.

== Athletics ==
=== State championships ===
- Class 'B' volleyball: 1991
- Class 'B' football: 1993

== Administration ==
North Dakota State Principal of the Year

- 2001 - Alton Nygaard - Des Lacs-Burlington High School

North Dakota State Superintendent of the Year

- 2000 - Joe Lukach - United Public School District 7
- 2007 - Clark Ranum - United Public School District 7

North Dakota Teacher of the Year

- 2010 - Mary Elredge-Sandbo, biology teacher

== Notable alumni ==
- Jeremy Horst, MLB pitcher
