= Hettinger High School =

School in North Dakota, United States

Coordinates: 45°59′59″N 102°38′01″W

Location
- 209 S 8th St; Hettinger, North Dakota 58639; United States

Information
- Type: Public
- Principal: Darin Seamands
- Staff: 13.60 (FTE)
- Grades: 7–12
- Enrollment: 122 (2024–2025)
- Student to teacher ratio: 8.53
- Colors: Black, white and royal blue
- Nickname: Night Hawks
- District: Hettinger School District
- Website: www.hettinger.k12.nd.us

Hettinger High School is a public high school located in Hettinger, North Dakota, United States. It is a part of the Hettinger School District. In the school year of 2025-2026, Hettinger Junior and Senior High School served a total of 139 students in grades 7-12. The athletic teams are known as the Night Hawks.

== Athletics ==
=== Championships ===
- State Class 'B' boys' basketball: 1957, 1983
- State Class 'A' wrestling: 1966
- State Class 'B' wrestling: 1996, 2000, 2001, 2017

== Notable alumni ==
- Rick Berg, U.S. representative from North Dakota
