= Hazen High School (North Dakota) =

Coordinates: 47°17′55″N 101°37′23″W

Hazen High School (Hazen, North Dakota)

Location
- 520 1st Ave NE; Hazen, North Dakota 58545

Information
- Type: public
- Established: 1885
- School district: Hazen Public Schools
- Hazen High School
- Formerly listed on the U.S. National Register of Historic Places
- Location within North Dakota Location within the United States
- Website: www.hazen.k12.nd.us
- NRHP reference No.: 77001026

Significant dates
- Added to NRHP: August 12, 1977
- Removed from NRHP: March 15, 1991
- Principal: Jacob Kraft
- Staff: 13.25 (FTE)
- Grades: 7–12
- Enrollment: 166 (2023–2024)
- Student to teacher ratio: 12.53
- Colors: Green and white
- Mascot: The Bison

Hazen High School is a public high school located in Hazen, North Dakota. It currently serves 169 students and is a part of the Hazen Public Schools system. The official school colors are green and white and the athletic teams are known as The Bison.

== Athletics ==
=== Championships ===
- State class "B" girls' basketball: 1994 1995 1996 1997 1998 1999 2000 2001 2002
- State class "B" football: 1996
- State class "A" football: 2012, 2013,2014,2015,2016
- State Class 'B' boys' track and field: 1972 co-champions, 2007, 2008
- State Class 'B' girls' track and field: 1993, 1994, 1995, 1996, 1997, 1998, 2015, 2016, 2017
- State Class 'B' volleyball: 1993 1995 1997 1998 2004 2005
- State Class 'B' girls' golf: 2008, 2009
- State Class 'B' boys' golf: 2008, 2009
