= Mike Peluso (ice hockey, born 1974) =

American ice hockey player

- Born: September 2, 1974 (age 51) Bismarck, North Dakota, U.S.
- Height: 6 ft 1 in (185 cm)
- Weight: 208 lb (94 kg; 14 st 12 lb)
- Position: Right wing
- Shot: Right
- Played for: Chicago Blackhawks; Philadelphia Flyers
- National team: United States
- NHL draft: 253rd overall, 1994; Calgary Flames
- Playing career: 1998–2004

Mike "Loose" Peluso (born September 2, 1974) is an American former professional ice hockey right winger who played 38 games in the National Hockey League (NHL) during the 2001–02 and 2003–04 seasons for the Chicago Blackhawks and Philadelphia Flyers.

== Playing career ==
He was drafted by the Calgary Flames in the 10th round of the 1994 NHL entry draft. He spent a majority of his career in the minor leagues, although he did see short amounts of time in the NHL with the Chicago Blackhawks and Philadelphia Flyers. Along with many call up's to the NHL Peluso was forced into retirement due to injuries Other notable hockey accomplishments: Mike is a top 20 all-time scorer in points and a top 10 all-time goal scorer at the University of Minnesota Duluth. Mike also holds the North Dakota High School hockey single season scoring record with 99 points in 23 games during the old 15-minute period era.

Peluso represented Team USA at the World Championships in Russia in 2000. Along with playing in the world championship, he represented Team USA in numerous other select teams over his career. He was also a 4-time AHL All-Star selection, and USHL All-Star two times, winning the hardest shot competition both years, registering shots close to 100 mph.

He retired after the 2003–04 NHL season. NHL lockout and injuries were reason for retirement. Mike had offers to play overseas and also to become a player coach in the AHL that lockout year, but chose to return to Bismarck.

Peluso went on to coaching back in North Dakota after retirement. Four seasons as an assistant coach with NAHL Bismarck Bobcats and 11 seasons as the head coach of the Bismarck High Demons. The Demons won their first State Title under Peluso in 2014. They were also lllState lllRunners-up five other times under Peluso's guidance and WDA Tournament lllChampions 6 times. Lots of Peluso's former players went on to play high-level juniors and Division I College.

== Personal life ==
Peluso is the younger cousin of Stanley Cup champion Mike Peluso, who also played for Chicago. A lot of Peluso's family members played at high levels. His uncle Tom was an All-American at the University of Denver and played professionally. His father Jim played at Denver for four years. His cousin Marco Peluso played at Minnesota-Duluth and went onto professional ice hockey. Two other cousins Chris Peluso and Molly Arola played at Bemidji State University. Two other distant cousins played for the Minnesota Golden Gophers.

As a head hockey coach at Bismarck High School, Peluso coached the team to their first-ever state title. He coached BHS for 11 seasons, bringing them to the state title game six times.

== Career statistics ==
=== Regular season and playoffs ===
			Regular season					Playoffs
Season	Team	League	GP	G	A	Pts	PIM	GP	G	A	Pts	PIM
1992–93	Omaha Lancers	USHL	45	21	12	33	31	9	5	4	9	8
1993–94	Omaha Lancers	USHL	48	36	29	65	77	—	—	—	—	—
1994–95	University of Minnesota-Duluth	WCHA	38	11	23	34	38	—	—	—	—	—
1995–96	University of Minnesota-Duluth	WCHA	38	25	19	44	64	—	—	—	—	—
1996–97	University of Minnesota-Duluth	WCHA	37	20	20	40	53	—	—	—	—	—
1997–98	University of Minnesota-Duluth	WCHA	40	24	21	45	100	—	—	—	—	—
1998–99	Portland Pirates	AHL	26	7	6	13	6	—	—	—	—	—
1999–00	Portland Pirates	AHL	71	25	29	54	86	4	2	0	2	0
2000–01	Portland Pirates	AHL	19	12	10	22	17	—	—	—	—	—
2000–01	Worcester IceCats	AHL	44	17	23	40	22	11	3	3	6	4
2001–02	Chicago Blackhawks	NHL	37	4	2	6	19	—	—	—	—	—
2001–02	Norfolk Admirals	AHL	29	18	9	27	4	4	1	0	1	0
2002–03	Norfolk Admirals	AHL	74	24	31	55	35	9	1	2	3	4
2003–04	Philadelphia Flyers	NHL	1	0	0	0	0	—	—	—	—	—
2003–04	Philadelphia Phantoms	AHL	72	13	18	31	87	5	0	1	1	4
AHL totals			335	116	126	242	257	33	7	6	13	12
NHL totals			38	2	4	6	19	—	—	—	—	—

=== International ===
Year	Team	Event	GP	G	A	Pts	PIM
2000	United States	WC	7	2	2	4	0
Senior totals			7	2	2	4	0

== Awards and honors ==
Award	Year
USHL Clark Cup champion	1992–93, 1993–94
All-WCHA Rookie Team	1994–95
All-WCHA Third Team	1995–96, 1997–98
All-WCHA Second Team	1996–97
AHL All-Star Game	2000, 2001, 2003, 2004
Inducted into Bismarck High School Hall of Fame	2007
Inducted into University of Minnesota Duluth Hall of Fame	2016

- Inducted into the North Dakota Sports Hall of Fame 2020
- Held the North Dakota high school single-season scoring record with 99 points until 2024-25 and now shares it with West Fargo Packer Bryce Mattern.
- First Bismarck native to play in any of the four major North American sports leagues.
