= Fairmount Public School District 18 =

School in North Dakota, United States

Coordinates: 46°03′20″N 96°36′00″W

Fairmount High School

Location
- 400 East Main Street; Fairmount, (Richland County), North Dakota 58030; United States

Information
- Type: Public high school
- Principal: Jay Townsend
- Staff: 5.95 (FTE)
- Enrollment: 39 (2023-2024)
- Student to teacher ratio: 6.55
- Colors: Purple, gold and black
- Nickname: Tigers

Fairmount Public School District 18 is a public school district headquartered in Fairmount, North Dakota, United States. It operates one school, K-12: Fairmount Public School.

The district includes Fairmount Township and sections of Devillo and LaMars townships.

== History ==
In 1965, the district held a bond election for building a facility for elementary school. The voters approved it on a 324-64 basis.

In 2002, the district stated that it lost $161,050 due to the Richland County government not giving the district the updated tax valuation information from the government of North Dakota in relation to the 2001-2002 school year. The district, with three others, hired a lawyer to settle the dispute.

In June 2004, Barry Loos became the superintendent. In April 2005, the enrollment was around 100. Around that month, due to conflicts between the superintendent and the board of trustees, the latter chose someone to do an arbitration process.

In 2022, Fairmount Public School had competed in a competition called Cyber Madness. Their team name was 344 Jarvis AI and they have continue to compete in competitions to this day. They won second place in 2022.

In 2023, superintendent Steve Hall replaced his predecessor Brain Nelson.
