= White Shield School District =

School district in North Dakota, United States

Address
- 2 2nd Avenue W White Shield, North Dakota, 58775; United States

District information
- Type: Public
- Grades: K–12
- NCES District ID: 3819680

Students and staff
- Students: 176
- Teachers: 23.46
- Staff: 25.5
- Student–teacher ratio: 7.5

Other information
- Website: www.white-shield.k12.nd.us

White Shield Public School District 85 is a school district headquartered in Roseglen, North Dakota.

It is entirely within McLean County and serves White Shield. It is affiliated with the Bureau of Indian Education (BIE).

It previous building is from 1952, and by 2021 it was gaining a new building. The current two-story, 63,000-square-foot (5,900 m^{2}) facility was scheduled to open in 2016.

To deal with teacher shortages, White Shield hired Filipino/a national teachers with J-1 visas. By February 2020 the school had no more vacancies of teachers.
