= Litchville-Marion School District =

School district in North Dakota, United States

Address
- 104 2nd Street Marion, North Dakota, 58466; United States

District information
- Type: Public
- Grades: PreK–12
- NCES District ID: 3800057

Students and staff
- Students: 141
- Teachers: 16.41
- Staff: 14.08
- Student–teacher ratio: 8.59

Other information
- Website: www.litchville-marion.k12.nd.us

Litchville-Marion School District No. 46 is a school district headquartered in Marion, North Dakota. It has an elementary school in Litchville and a secondary school in Marion.

In the 1993–1994 school year the Litchville and Marion school districts decided to do a trial where the two districts had all elementary students in Litchville and all secondary students in Marion. In 2002 the two school districts permanently merged. As of 2021 it had 77 elementary and 53 secondary students.

It includes sections of Barnes, LaMoure, Ransom, and Stutsman counties.
