= Beulah High School =

Coordinates: 47°16′10″N 101°46′49″W

Location
- 204 5th St NW; Beulah, North Dakota; USA

Information
- Type: Public
- School district: Beulah Public Schools
- Principal: Kevin Hoherz
- Teaching staff: 18.03 (FTE)
- Grades: 9–12
- Enrollment: 205 (2023–2024)
- Student to teacher ratio: 11.37
- Colors: Blue and gold
- Mascot: The Miner
- Team name: Miners
- Website: Beulah High School

Beulah High School is a public high school located in Beulah, North Dakota. It currently serves 200 students and is a part of the Beulah Public Schools system. The official school colors are blue and gold and the athletic teams are known as the Miners.

== Athletics ==
=== Championships ===
- State class "B" baseball: 1956, 2012
- State class "B" football: 1989, 2015
- State Class 'B' boys' track and field: 1986, 1987, 1988, 1989, 1990
- State Class 'B' girls' track and field: 1987, 1988
- State Class 'B' volleyball: 1989, 1995, 1996
- State Class 'B' basketball: 2012
