= Warwick Public Schools (North Dakota) =

School district in North Dakota, United States

Warwick Public School District No. 29, also known as Warwick Public Schools, is a school district in Warwick, North Dakota.

Within Benson County it serves Warwick, and it also has a portion in Eddy County.

In 2019 the district had over 100 students, almost all of them being American Indians. The school uses a Native American mascot. Superintendent Dean Dauphinais, a member of the Turtle Mountain Band of Chippewa Indians, stated that the mascot helps Native American students find pride.

== History ==
In 1978 Joseph F. Moore began his term as superintendent. He had a contract expiring on July 1, 1983, In 1982 he began to experience blindness, and was dismissed from his position on December 22 of that year. He sued the school district, accusing it of unfairly terminating him.
