= Grafton High School (North Dakota) =

Coordinates: 48°24′26″N 97°25′27″W

Location
- 1548 School Rd. Grafton, North Dakota 58237; United States

Information
- Type: Public
- Established: 1981
- School district: Grafton Public Schools
- Superintendent: Darren Albrecht
- Staff: 20.00 (FTE)
- Grades: 9-12
- Student to teacher ratio: 14.55
- Colors: Maroon and gold
- Song: College Boy
- Mascot: Spoilers
- Website: www.gospoilers.org/o/ghs

Grafton High School is a public high school built in 1981 and located in Grafton, North Dakota. The school is part of the Grafton Public Schools system. The official school colors are maroon and gold and the athletic teams are known as the Spoilers. The current principal is Randy Rice, Activities Director and Assistant Principal is Jon Koehmstedt (RIP) and Superintendent is Darren Albrecht.

== Demographics ==
As of the 2017–18 school year, Grafton High School's student body racial demographics consisted of 64% White, 32% Hispanic, 2% Black, 1% American Indian/Alaskan Native, 0.4% Asian, and 0.4% Two or More Races.

== Athletics ==
Grafton High School offers 15 athletic varsity programs and is a member of the North Dakota High School Activities Association (NDHSAA).

=== Athletic co-ops ===
Grafton High School has played host to the Grafton-Park River hockey co-op since the 1982–83 season. GHS has also played host in football, boys' and girls' basketball, cross country, softball, and wrestling. Athletes from Park River, St. Thomas, Minto, Drayton, Cavalier, and Langdon have had the opportunity to participate in Spoiler activities.

=== Championships ===
- State Class "A" boys’ basketball: 1935, 1964,
- State Class "B" boys’ basketball: 1934, 1937, 2008
- State Class "A" boys' hockey: 1978, 1985, 1991†, 2002†, 2008†
- State Class "AA" football: 2011, 2021, 2023, 2024, 2025
- State Class "B" girls’ basketball: 2012, 2021
- State Class "B" girls' cross country: 2007

† As Grafton - Park River

== Notable alumni ==
- Lynn Frazier - politician; 12th Governor of North Dakota and U.S. Senator
