= Minot High School =

Location
- 1100 11th Ave. SW; Minot, North Dakota; United States; 48.227°N 101.31°W

Information
- Type: Public
- Established: 1887, 1918, 1974 (current)
- School district: Minot Public Schools
- Grades: 9–12
- Enrollment: 2,015 (2023–2024)
- Colors: Maroon, gold
- Athletics: NDHSAA Class A (Football: Class AAA)
- Athletics conference: Western Dakota (WDC)
- Mascot: Magicians
- Rival: Minot North (2024)
- Yearbook: Searchlight
- Feeder schools: Middle schools: Jim Hill, Central
- Elevation: 1,640 ft (500 m) AMSL
- Website: Minot High School

Location in the United States
Location in North Dakota

Minot High School (MHS) is a public high school in Minot, North Dakota, and serves the majority of the city. A second public high school, Minot North (48.26°N 101.324°W), opened in August 2024 with students from the northern portion of the city and Minot Air Force Base, thirteen miles (21 km) north.

Previously, MHS was divided between two main campuses: Magic City (1974, grades 11–12) and Central (1918, grades 9–10). Its enrollment was among the largest in the state, drawing from the entire city and the air base. Magic City is now Minot High School (9–12) and Central is the district's fourth middle school. MHS also includes an alternative campus: Souris River Campus.

== Athletics ==
The boys' athletic teams are known as the "Magicians" or "Magi", while the girls' teams are called the "Majettes". The school's mascot is a magician and the varsity teams compete against the largest high schools in the state in Class A (Class AAA for football, see North Dakota High School Activities Association).

Minot is known as the "Magic City" because of its rapid development in 1886, after the arrival of the Great Northern railroad.

=== State championships ===
==== Boys ====
- Football, Class 'A': 1910, 1935, 1941, 1980, 2023
- Basketball, Class 'A': 1916, 1934, 1936, 1937, 1949, 1950, 1955, 1961, 1965, 1971, 1980, 1988, 1990, 1995, 1999, 2015, 2016, 2017, 2022
- Hockey: 1992 (first West team to win), 2015
- Wrestling, Class 'A': 1967, 1968, 1969, 1970, 1971, 1993, 2017
- Swimming: 1975, 1978, 1979, 1980, 1981, 1982, 1983, 1988, 1989, 1990, 1991, 1992, 1993, 1999, 2000, 2001, 2002, 2003, 2004, 2005, 2006, 2007, 2008, 2010, 2011, 2018, 2019, 2020, 2021
- Soccer: 1989, 2006
- Track and field, Class 'A': 1942, 1974, 1975, 1976, 1977, 1978, 1979, 1980, 1984 co-champions, 1985, 2001, 2002
- Baseball, Class 'A': 1999, 2005 (first awarded in 1994)

==== Girls ====
- Basketball: Class 'A': 1978, 2022
- Soccer: Class 'A': 2021, 2022
- Swimming: 1978, 1979, 1980, 1981, 1982, 1983, 1984, 1985, 1986, 1987, 1988, 1994, 1995, 1996, 1997, 1998, 2003, 2004, 2005, 2006, 2007, 2008, 2013
- Track and field, Class 'A': 1966 (one class), 1972, 1978, 1981, 1984, 1988, 1989, 1991, 1992, 1993, 1994, 1995, 1996, 1997

== Notable alumni ==
- Ryan Bollinger, baseball pitcher
- Gary Cederstrom, retired Major League Baseball umpire
- Jerry Gaetz, North Dakota state senator
- David C. Jones, U.S. Air Force general, Chairman of the Joint Chiefs of Staff
- Herro Mustafa, U.S. Ambassador to Bulgaria
- Josh Duhamel, Actor
- Donny Schatz, race car driver
