= Shanley High School =

School in North Dakota, US

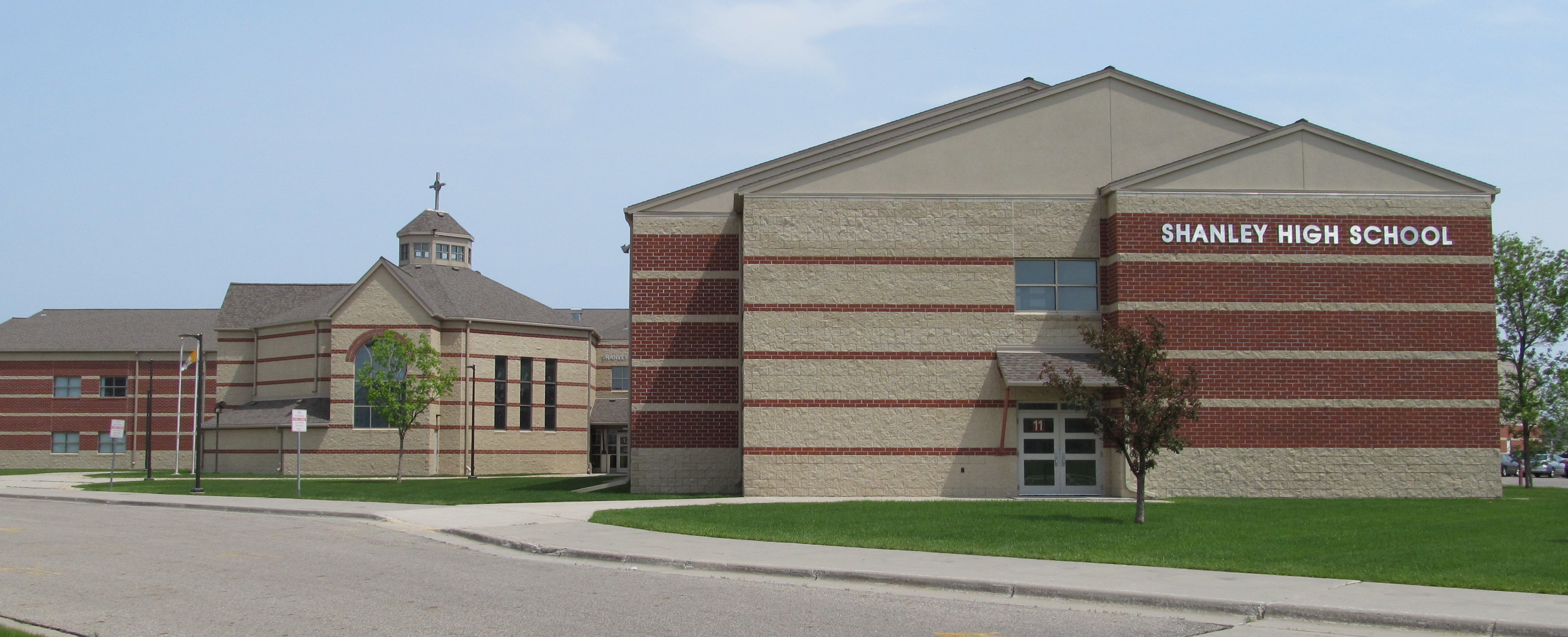

Location
- 5600 25th Street South; Fargo, United States of America, North Dakota 58104; United States; 46°47′56″N 96°49′2″W

Information
- Type: Private, coeducational
- Motto: "To teach the total person and foster the following of Christ"
- Religious affiliation: Roman Catholic
- School district: John Paul II Catholic Schools Network
- Principal: Kyle Metzger
- Grades: 9–12
- Colors: Red and white
- Fight song: Forward for Shanley High
- Team name: Deacons
- Accreditation: North Central Association of Colleges and Schools
- Newspaper: S.H.A.C.K.
- Yearbook: Reminiscor
- Former names: Sacred Heart Academy (1897-1950)
- Website: jp2schools.org/our-schools/shanley-high-school/

Shanley High School (formerly Sacred Heart Academy), is a Catholic high school located in Fargo, North Dakota and operated by the Diocese of Fargo as part of the John Paul II Catholic Schools Network. As of 2014, it served approximately 314 students. Academics are strongly oriented towards college preparatory with approximately 99% of the student body continuing to either a 2 or 4-year degree program. In addition to standard academics courses, student complete required religious education courses during each academic semester.

== History ==
In 1882, a group of Presentation Sisters from Ireland, immigrated to Fargo, North Dakota and opened St. Joseph's Academy, the first Catholic school in Fargo. In 1897, the school was renamed Sacred Heart Academy and moved into a new building on North Broadway. Sacred Heart originally provided primary and secondary education. After the 1950 academic year, the school moved to a new building, and was renamed Shanley High School in honor of John Shanley, the first bishop of Fargo. Less than a decade after opening, the school was severely damaged by a violent F5 tornado in 1957 that destroyed much of north Fargo.

Starting in 1964, the De LaSalle Christian Brothers began involvement with the school, acting as both administrators and teachers. Christian Brothers and Presentation Sisters would continue to work in the school until 1989.

In 2001, construction began on the joint Shanley High School and Sacred Heart Middle School building. This $13.9 million project moved the school from its original location (Note: 705 13th Ave. N., Fargo, ND) in north Fargo to an 80-acre site in south Fargo shared with Sts. Anne & Joachim Catholic Church. The final academic year in the original building completed in May 2002.

In the fall of 2010, Shanley High School completed construction and expansion of existing activities facilities along with the creation of a multi-purpose football and soccer field named "Sid Cichy Stadium" in honor of one of the program's former coaches. The project includes plans for a baseball field as well as track and field facilities.

In 2019, a Shanley bus driver, Bruce Arnold Tweed, was arrested and given a DUI by the Fargo Police. The police were given a report of a bus being driven erratically. Police followed the bus, which was on the route from Trinity School after the school day, into the parking lot of the Shanley-Sacred heart campus. The police confirmed that there were minors board and Bruce Arnold Tweed had blood alcohol content of .12.

== Activities ==
=== Athletics ===
Throughout the 1950s to 1970s, Shanley's football team rose to prominence under head coach Sid Cichy. Throughout his tenure (1948–1977) the team won 16 state titles and completed 11 undefeated seasons. At one time the Deacons held the record for longest consecutive unbeaten streak in the country, having won 59 games in a row.

In 2009, Shanley was reclassed to "AA", the second level of North Dakota's four-class football system. They returned to class "AAA" in 2019. Shanley also has shown its ability to produce NFL talent as of late.

==== North Dakota State Championships ====
- State Class 'A' boys' basketball: 1997, 1998, 2013
- State Class 'A' girls' basketball: 1980, 1982, 1983, 1989, 1996, 1997, 2002, 2014, 2015, 2016, 2020*
- Football: 1950, 1952, 1953, 1954, 1955, 1956, 1957, 1958, 1967, 1968, 1969, 1970, 1972, 1973, 1974, 1975, 1976, 1977, 1981, 1983, 2009, 2010, 2012, 2018
- State Class 'AAA' football: 2022
- State Class 'AA' football: 2009, 2010, 2012, 2018
- State Class 'B' football: 1939, 1940, 1941 (as Sacred Heart Academy)
- State Class 'A' volleyball: 1988, 1991, 2014
- State Class 'A' girls' soccer: 2012
- State Class 'A' girls' golf: 2005, 2006, 2007
- State Class 'A' boys' soccer: 2008, 2023
- State Class 'A' boys' golf: 2014
- State Class 'A' baseball: 2013, 2024
- State boys' ice hockey: 2023

=== Choral department ===
Members of the choir participate in numerous music festivals and competitions. In the fall of 2005, Shanley's Concert Chorale was given the designation of "Governor's Choir" for the state of North Dakota.

== Notable alumni ==
- Dan Arnold – National Football League player
- Joe Cichy – inductee of the College Football Hall of Fame
- Rick Helling – Major League Baseball player
- Liz Magill – legal scholar and academic administrator
- Roger Maris – Major League Baseball player and former single-season home run record holder
- Connor McGovern – National Football League player
