= Watford City High School =

Coordinates: 47°48′06″N 103°16′46″W

Location
- 2313 Wolves Den Parkway; Watford City, North Dakota 58854; USA

Information
- Type: Public
- Established: 1915
- School district: McKenzie County School District
- Principal: Terry Vanderpan
- Teaching staff: 42.00 (FTE)
- Grades: 9-12
- Enrollment: 511 (2023–2024)
- Student to teacher ratio: 12.17
- Color
- Mascot: Wolf
- Website: www.watford-city.k12.nd.us/schools/watford-high

Watford City High School is a public high school located in Watford City, North Dakota. Fall enrollment for the 2016–2017 school year was 549 students and is a part of the McKenzie County School District #1.

The athletic teams are known as the Wolves. Athletic teams in the area not affiliated with Watford City High School have other mascots, such as the hockey teams' mascot, the Oilers, and the public legion baseball teams' mascot, the Walleye. This may change with the new Watford City Event Center and a proposed hockey facility.

The new high school has officially opened as of February 16, 2016.

== Athletics ==
=== Championships ===
- State Class 'B' boys' basketball: 1991
- State Class 'B' football: 1975, 1976, 1978, 1979, 1985, 1986
- State Class 'AA' football: 1998, 2006, 2008
- State Class 'B' wrestling: 1972, 1973, 1974
- State Class 'B' girls' golf: 2007
- State Class 'B' baseball: 2014
