= Munich Public School District =

School in Munich, North Dakota, United States

Address
- 410 7th Ave Munich, North Dakota, 58352; United States
- Coordinates: 48.6669°N 98.8337°W

District information
- Grades: Pre-school - 12
- Superintendent: Kevin Baumgarn
- Enrollment: 89

Other information
- Telephone: (701) 682-5321
- Website: school.munich.k12.nd.us

The Munich Public School District is a public school district in Cavalier County, North Dakota in the United States, based in Munich, North Dakota.

== Schools ==
The Munich Public School District has one elementary school and one high school.

=== Elementary school ===
- Munich Elementary School

=== High school ===
- Munich High School (Cardinals)
