= Glenfield, North Dakota =

- City
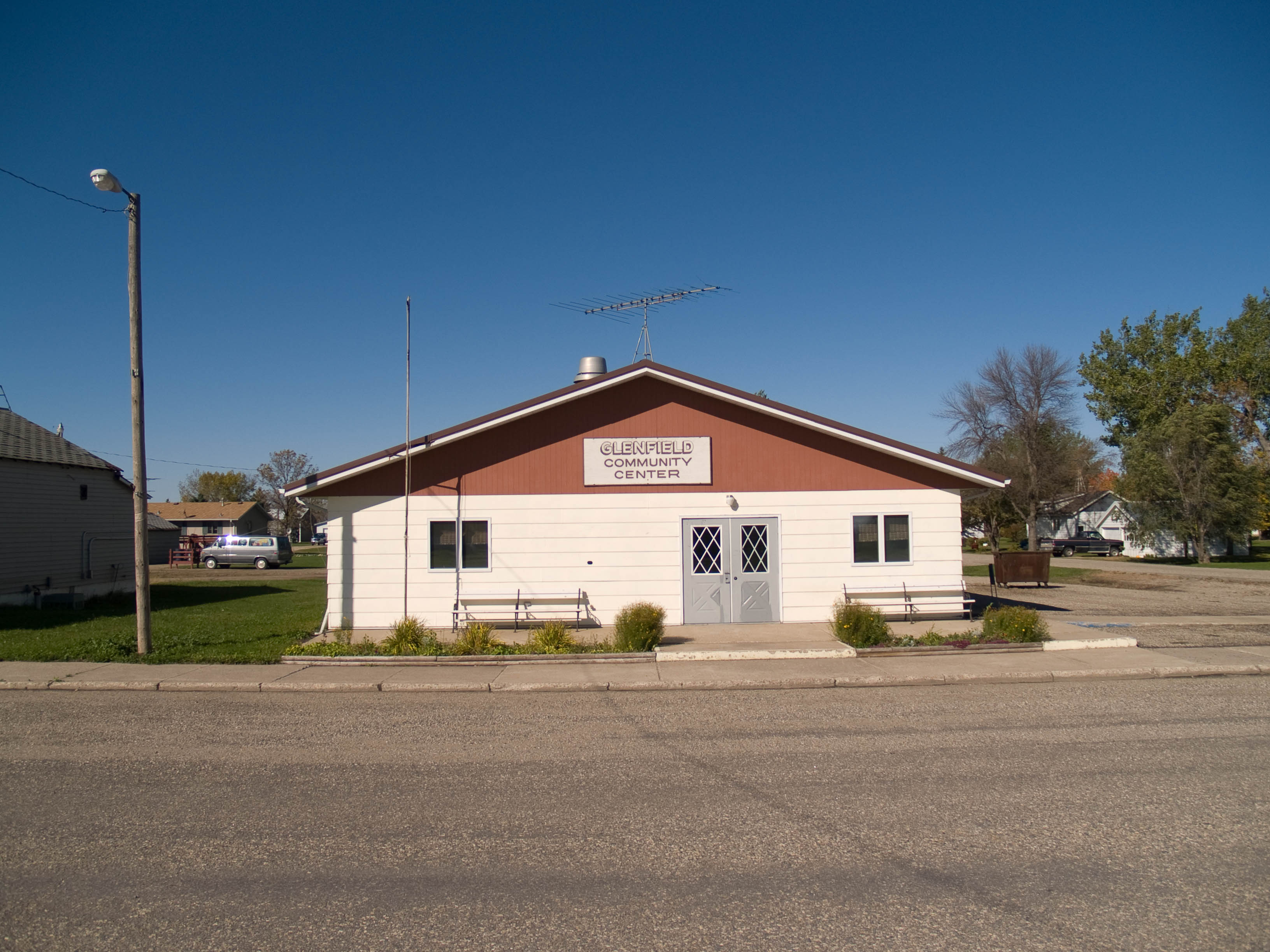
- Glenfield Community Center

- Location of Glenfield, North Dakota
- Coordinates: 47°27′18″N 98°33′58″W
- Country: United States
- State: North Dakota
- County: Foster
- Founded: 1912

Area
  - Total: 0.14 sq mi (0.35 km^{2})
  - Land: 0.14 sq mi (0.35 km^{2})
  - Water: 0 sq mi (0.00 km^{2})
- Elevation: 1,496 ft (456 m)

Population (2020)
  - Total: 94
  - Estimate (2022): 96
  - Density: 686.5/sq mi (265.04/km^{2})
- Time zone: UTC-6 (Central (CST))
  - Summer (DST): UTC-5 (CDT)
- ZIP code: 58443
- Area code: 701
- FIPS code: 38-30660
- GNIS feature ID: 1036057

Glenfield is a city in Foster County, North Dakota, United States. The population was 94 at the 2020 census. Glenfield was founded in 1912.

== Geography ==
According to the United States Census Bureau, the city has a total area of 0.14 square miles (0.36 km^{2}), all land.

== Demographics ==
Historical population
Census	Pop.	Note	%±
1960	129		—
1970	127		−1.6%
1980	164		29.1%
1990	118		−28.0%
2000	134		13.6%
2010	91		−32.1%
2020	94		3.3%
2022 (est.)	96		2.1%
U.S. Decennial Census; 2020 Census

=== 2010 census ===
As of the census of 2010, there were 91 people, 44 households, and 24 families residing in the city. The population density was 650.0 inhabitants per square mile (251.0/km^{2}). There were 57 housing units at an average density of 407.1 per square mile (157.2/km^{2}). The racial makeup of the city was 100.0% White.

There were 44 households, of which 20.5% had children under the age of 18 living with them, 43.2% were married couples living together, 6.8% had a female householder with no husband present, 4.5% had a male householder with no wife present, and 45.5% were non-families. 43.2% of all households were made up of individuals, and 22.8% had someone living alone who was 65 years of age or older. The average household size was 2.07 and the average family size was 2.83.

The median age in the city was 47.8 years. 18.7% of residents were under the age of 18; 5.5% were between the ages of 18 and 24; 22% were from 25 to 44; 27.5% were from 45 to 64; and 26.4% were 65 years of age or older. The gender makeup of the city was 53.8% male and 46.2% female.

=== 2000 census ===
As of the census of 2000, there were 134 people, 57 households, and 38 families residing in the city. The population density was 1,043.3 inhabitants per square mile (402.8/km^{2}). There were 59 housing units at an average density of 459.4 per square mile (177.4/km^{2}). The racial makeup of the city was 97.76% White, and 2.24% from two or more races.

There were 57 households, out of which 26.3% had children under the age of 18 living with them, 57.9% were married couples living together, 5.3% had a female householder with no husband present, and 33.3% were non-families. 29.8% of all households were made up of individuals, and 19.3% had someone living alone who was 65 years of age or older. The average household size was 2.35 and the average family size was 2.97.

In the city, the population was spread out, with 26.1% under the age of 18, 5.2% from 18 to 24, 22.4% from 25 to 44, 23.9% from 45 to 64, and 22.4% who were 65 years of age or older. The median age was 40 years. For every 100 females, there were 88.7 males. For every 100 females age 18 and over, there were 80.0 males.

The median income for a household in the city was $24,583, and the median income for a family was $26,875. Males had a median income of $26,875 versus $30,833 for females. The per capita income for the city was $12,125. There were 23.3% of families and 24.8% of the population living below the poverty line, including 24.1% of under eighteens and 46.7% of those over 64.
