= Grand Forks Central High School =

Coordinates: 47°55′30″N 97°02′02″W

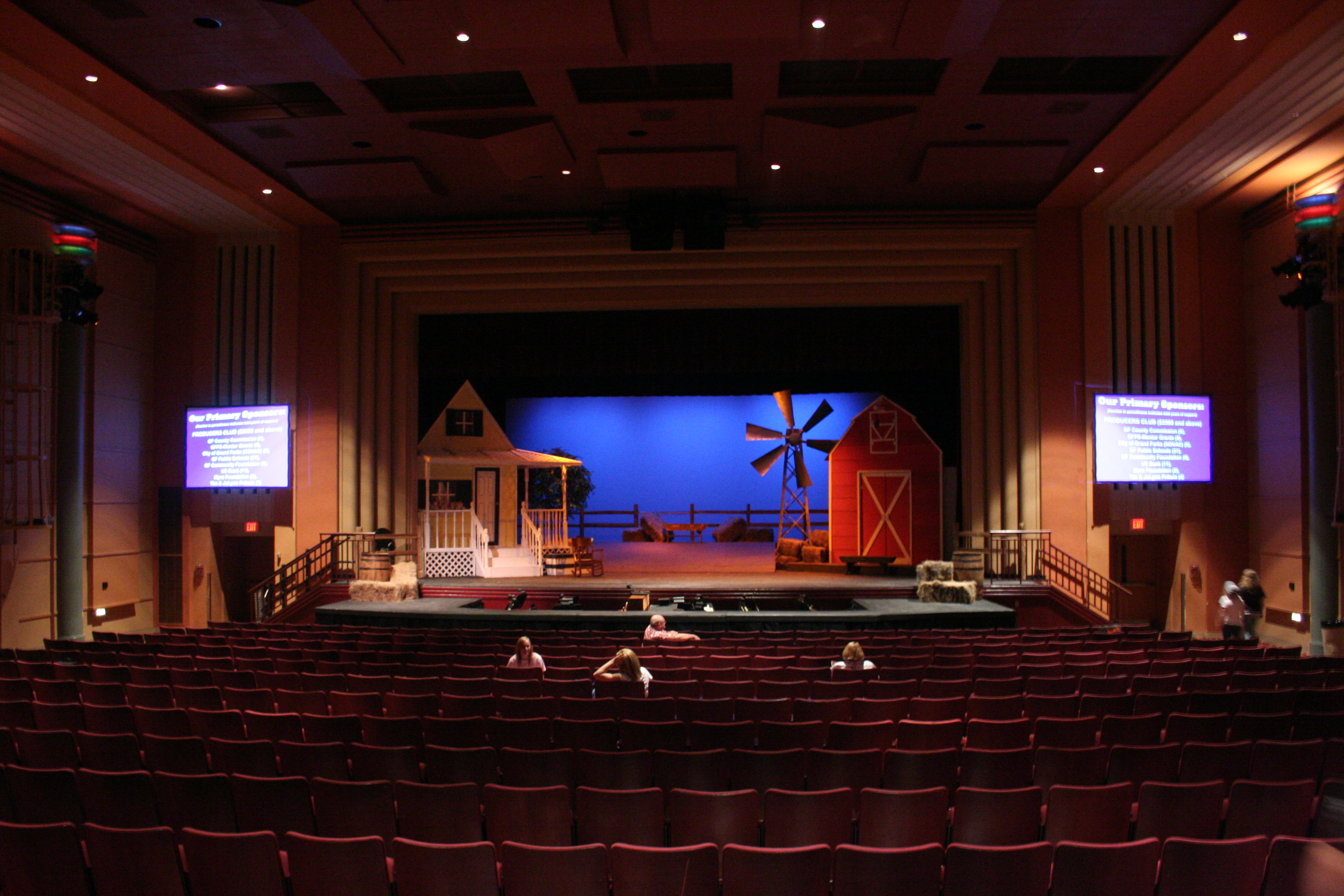

Location
- 115 North 4th Street; Grand Forks, North Dakota 58203; United States

Information
- Type: Public
- Motto: "Providing opportunities to learn, build character, and strive for excellence."
- Established: 1881
- School district: Grand Forks Public Schools
- Principal: Jon Strandell
- Teaching staff: 81.00 (FTE)
- Grades: 9-12
- Enrollment: 1,091 (2023–2024)
- Student to teacher ratio: 13.47
- Colors: Maroon and grey
- Mascot: Knights
- Website: Grand Forks Central H.S.

Grand Forks Central High School (GFC) is a public senior high school in the Grand Forks Public Schools district. It is located in downtown Grand Forks, North Dakota.

Dependent children living on Grand Forks Air Force Base are zoned to Grand Forks Central.

== History ==
GFC was originally built in 1882 at a cost of $26,000.

Its first graduating class graduated in 1886, and consisted of three women, including Emma Oldham and Mary Parsons.

The original building underwent major renovation in 1911, and construction was completed on the current main building in 1917. The original structure was demolished in 1937 to build the auditorium, as part of The New Deal's Public Works Administration program. In 1985, construction began on a new media center, cafeteria, updated classrooms, and . The most recent addition was a fine arts wing, a new home for the department, which for the first time included a back stage and a proper set storage area, as well as a black box theater.

Grand Forks Central is the oldest still-operating in North Dakota.

== Sports offered ==
- Basketball (boys' and girls')
- Baseball (boys')
- Cheerleading (co-ed)
- Cross-country (boys' and girls')
- Football (boys')
- Hockey (boys')
- Hockey (girls')*
- Soccer (boys' and girls')
- Softball (girls')
- Swimming & Diving (boys' and girls')*
- Golf (boys' and girls')
- Tennis (boys' and girls')
- Track and Field (boys' and girls')
- Volleyball (girls')
- Wrestling (co-ed)
- Figure skating
- Gymnastics (girls') was cancelled for the 2025 season and no longer remains active
- RRHS and Central High School have combined teams in several sporting areas, due to low participation numbers. Co-op sports have been adopted the mascot of the "Knightriders".

=== Championships ===
- State Class 'A' boys' basketball: 1927, 1946, 1947, 1952, 1956, 1970, 1974, 1996
- State Class 'A' boys' track and field: 1903, 1904, 1906, 1908 co-champions, 1911, 1913, 1914 co-champions, 1915, 1916, 1922 co-champions, 1926, 1927, 1940, 1955, 1956, 1961, 1963, 1964, 1966
- State Class 'A' girls' track and field: 1986, 1987
- State Class 'A' football: 1906, 1913, 1915, 1916, 1931, 1934, 1938, 1946, 1963
- State Class 'AAA' football: 2005
- State boys' hockey: 1961, 1962, 1963, 1964, 1965, 1966, 1967, 1968, 1969, 1970, 1971, 1972, 1973, 1975, 1976, 1977, 1979, 1980, 1983, 1984, 1993, 1995, 2003, 2004, 2010, 2017, 2018, 2019, 2021, 2025
- State Class 'A' baseball: 2000, 2006
- State girls' soccer: 1997
- State Class 'A' cross country: 1998
- State Class 'A' speech: 1981, 1982, 1984
- State Girls Gymnastics: 2004, 2005, 2006

== Notable alumni ==
- Brooks Bollinger (b. 1979), professional football quarterback
- Clifton Emmet "Cliff" Cushman (1938–1966), Olympic hurdler and pilot, U.S. Air Force; killed in the Vietnam War; Cushman Field in Grand Forks is named in his honor
- Jerry Gaetz (1914–1964), North Dakota state senator
- Glenn Hansen (b. 1952), professional basketball player who played for the Kansas City Kings and Chicago Bulls and founder of a local construction company
- Stuart McDonald (1931–2021), editorial cartoonist and two-term Republican representative in the North Dakota House of Representatives
- Lute Olson (1934–2020), Hall of Fame Collegiate basketball coach. Led Central to 1952 State Basketball title
- Dickie Peterson (1946–2009), co-founder, bass player and lead singer of influential hard rock band Blue Cheer
- Richard St. Clair (b. 1946), prominent composer of modern classical music
- Andrew Towne (b. 1982), member of the team that completed the first human-powered transit of the Drake Passage
- Kathryn Uhrich (b. 1965), Professor of Chemistry, Dean of Math and Physical Sciences at Rutgers University; founder of Polymerix Corporation
