= Bismarck High School =

Public high school located in Bismarck, North Dakota

Coordinates: 46.813678°N 100.779929°W

Location
- 800 North 8th Street; Bismarck, North Dakota 58501; United States

Information
- Type: Public high school
- Motto: Excellence in Academics and Athletics
- Established: 1873
- School district: Bismarck Public Schools
- NCES District ID: 0503240
- NCES School ID: 050324000086
- Principal: David Wistoff
- Staff: 85.00 (FTE)
- Grades: 9-12
- Enrollment: 1,371 (2023-2024)
- Student to teacher ratio: 16.13
- Schedule: Periods
- Colors: Maroon and white
- Mascot: Demon
- National ranking: 7,922
- Publication: PenSoul literary magazine
- Newspaper: HiHerald
- Yearbook: Prairie Breezes
- Feeder schools: Wachter Middle School
- Website: bhs.bismarckschools.org

Bismarck High School (BHS) is a public high school located in Bismarck, North Dakota. It currently serves 1,197 students and is a part of the Bismarck Public Schools system. The grades offered at Bismarck High school are ninth through twelfth. The student body consists of 50.45 percent male and 49.55 percent female. The official school colors are maroon and white and its athletic teams are known as the Demons. It is one of three high schools in Bismarck.

In addition to sections of Bismarck, its boundary includes Lincoln.

== History ==
BHS was originally established in 1873, with a subsequent building in 1912, then the core of the present building in 1934–35.

The present building, designed in the Classical Moderne (or PWA Moderne) style was, at the time, the largest Public Works Administration (PWA) project in the state. Designed by architect Robert A. Ritterbush of Ritterbush Brothers, the general contractor was Maurice Schumacher (Minneapolis). The exterior brick with stone lintels for doorways and window frames, and aluminum spandrels for decoration. The pilasters between the window bays are fluted. Three roof elevations on the gymnasium wing, with locker rooms, stage, and gymnasium proper. The foundation is dull-rose colored Kasota limestone; Hebron faced brick in a greyish brown color; the only wood initially used in the structure were for finishing purposes and some of the floors. It was constructed just north of the 1912 building, which was converted into a junior high school and demolished ahead of school's expansion in 1962-63 (also designed by Ritterbush Brothers).

649 students enrolled, though only half of that was expected. It remained the only high school in Bismarck until 1975 when Century High School was built.

== Athletics ==
=== Championships ===
- State Class 'A' boys' basketball: 1930, 1933, 1953, 1957, 1958, 1959, 1972, 1994, 2000, 2001, 2005, 2008, 2010
- State Class 'A' girls' basketball: 1991, 2009
- State Class 'A' football: 1928, 1929, 1943, 1949, 1962, 1984, 1985
- State Class 'AAA' football: 2001, 2008, 2009, 2011, 2012, 2018
- State girls' hockey: 2006, 2007, 2013
- State Class 'A' wrestling: "Individual Tournament"

1960, 1961, 1962, 1963, 1965, 1972, 1973, 1974, 1975, 1976, 1978, 1979, 1980, 1981, 1982, 1983, 1984, 1986, 1989, 1991, 1992, 1996, 1998, 2000, 2002, 2003, 2004, 2005, 2008, 2009, 2010, 2011, 2014, 2015, 2016, 2018, 2019, 2020, 2021, 2022

- State Class 'A' wrestling: "Dual Team"

2000, 2001, 2002, 2003, 2004, 2005, 2006, 2007, 2008, 2009, 2011, 2015, 2016, 2017, 2018, 2020, 2021, 2022

- State boys' soccer: 1996, 1997, 2015, 2017
- State girls' soccer: 2000, 2005
- State Class 'A' boys' track and field: 1929, 1930, 1932, 1933 co-champions, 1945, 1946, 1947, 1948, 1949, 1950, 1951, 1952, 1957, 1958, 1968, 1969, 1970, 1971, 1972, 1973, 1991, 1993, 1994, 2004, 2005, 2006, 2007, 2008, 2009, 2010, 2011, 2012, 2013, 2014
- State Class 'A' girls' track and field: 1983, 2006, 2008, 2010
- State Class 'A' volleyball: 1984
- State Class 'A' baseball: 2003, 2014

== Notable alumni ==
- Weston Dressler, CFL player for the Saskatchewan Roughriders and Winnipeg Blue Bombers
- Treysen Eaglestaff, college basketball player
- Greg Eslinger, professional football player
- Jamalcolm Liggins, professional football player
- Mike Peluso, professional hockey player
- Fannie Almara Quain, first woman born in North Dakota to earn a doctor of medicine degree
- Harold Schafer, businessman
