= Newburg, North Dakota =

- City
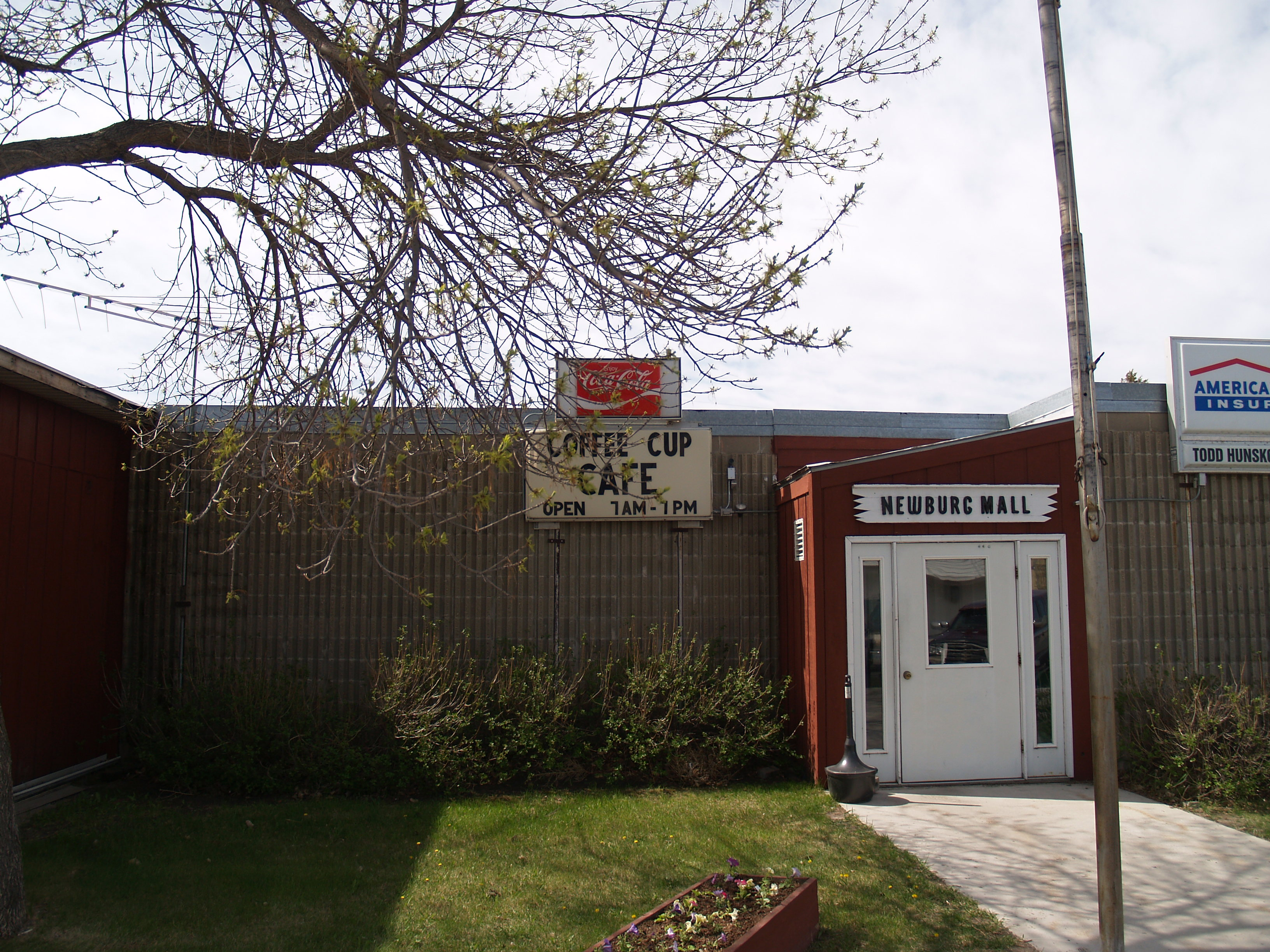
- Newburg Mall

- Location of Newburg, North Dakota
- Coordinates: 48°42′50″N 100°54′46″W
- Country: United States
- State: North Dakota
- County: Bottineau
- Founded: 1906

Area
  - Total: 0.14 sq mi (0.36 km^{2})
  - Land: 0.14 sq mi (0.36 km^{2})
  - Water: 0 sq mi (0.00 km^{2})
- Elevation: 1,463 ft (446 m)

Population (2020)
  - Total: 96
  - Estimate (2022): 93
  - Density: 683.7/sq mi (263.97/km^{2})
- Time zone: UTC-6 (Central (CST))
  - Summer (DST): UTC-5 (CDT)
- ZIP code: 58762
- Area code: 701
- FIPS code: 38-56020
- GNIS feature ID: 1036179

Newburg is a city in Bottineau County, North Dakota, United States. The population was 96 at the 2020 census. Newburg was founded in 1906.

== Geography ==
According to the United States Census Bureau, the city has a total area of 0.13 square miles (0.34 km^{2}), all land.

== Demographics ==
Historical population
Census	Pop.	Note	%±
1910	102		—
1920	110		7.8%
1930	87		−20.9%
1940	119		36.8%
1950	105		−11.8%
1960	158		50.5%
1970	125		−20.9%
1980	151		20.8%
1990	104		−31.1%
2000	88		−15.4%
2010	110		25.0%
2020	96		−12.7%
2022 (est.)	93		−3.1%
U.S. Decennial Census; 2020 Census

=== 2010 census ===
As of the census of 2010, there were 110 people, 54 households, and 24 families living in the city. The population density was 846.2 inhabitants per square mile (326.7/km^{2}). There were 62 housing units at an average density of 476.9 per square mile (184.1/km^{2}). The racial makeup of the city was 91.8% White and 8.2% from other races. Hispanic or Latino of any race were 9.1% of the population.

There were 54 households, of which 22.2% had children under the age of 18 living with them, 42.6% were married couples living together, 1.9% had a female householder with no husband present, and 55.6% were non-families. 48.1% of all households were made up of individuals, and 24.1% had someone living alone who was 65 years of age or older. The average household size was 2.04 and the average family size was 3.04.

The median age in the city was 37 years. 24.5% of residents were under the age of 18; 4.5% were between the ages of 18 and 24; 25.4% were from 25 to 44; 29.1% were from 45 to 64; and 16.4% were 65 years of age or older. The gender makeup of the city was 53.6% male and 46.4% female.

=== 2000 census ===
As of the census of 2000, there were 88 people, 47 households, and 25 families living in the city. The population density was 676.9 inhabitants per square mile (261.4/km^{2}). There were 64 housing units at an average density of 492.3 per square mile (190.1/km^{2}). The racial makeup of the city was 100.00% White.

There were 47 households, out of which 17.0% had children under the age of 18 living with them, 46.8% were married couples living together, 4.3% had a female householder with no husband present, and 46.8% were non-families. 42.6% of all households were made up of individuals, and 27.7% had someone living alone who was 65 years of age or older. The average household size was 1.87 and the average family size was 2.52.

In the city, the population was spread out, with 15.9% under the age of 18, 4.5% from 18 to 24, 22.7% from 25 to 44, 26.1% from 45 to 64, and 30.7% who were 65 years of age or older. The median age was 48 years. For every 100 females, there were 83.3 males. For every 100 females age 18 and over, there were 80.5 males.

The median income for a household in the city was $23,750, and the median income for a family was $28,125. Males had a median income of $23,750 versus $21,250 for females. The per capita income for the city was $17,381. There were 16.1% of families and 24.0% of the population living below the poverty line, including 54.5% of under eighteens and 6.9% of those over 64.

== Climate ==
This climatic region is typified by large seasonal temperature differences, with warm to hot (and often humid) summers and cold (sometimes severely cold) winters. According to the Köppen Climate Classification system, Newburg has a humid continental climate, abbreviated "Dfb" on climate maps.
