= Connor McGovern (American football, born 1993) =

American football player (born 1993)

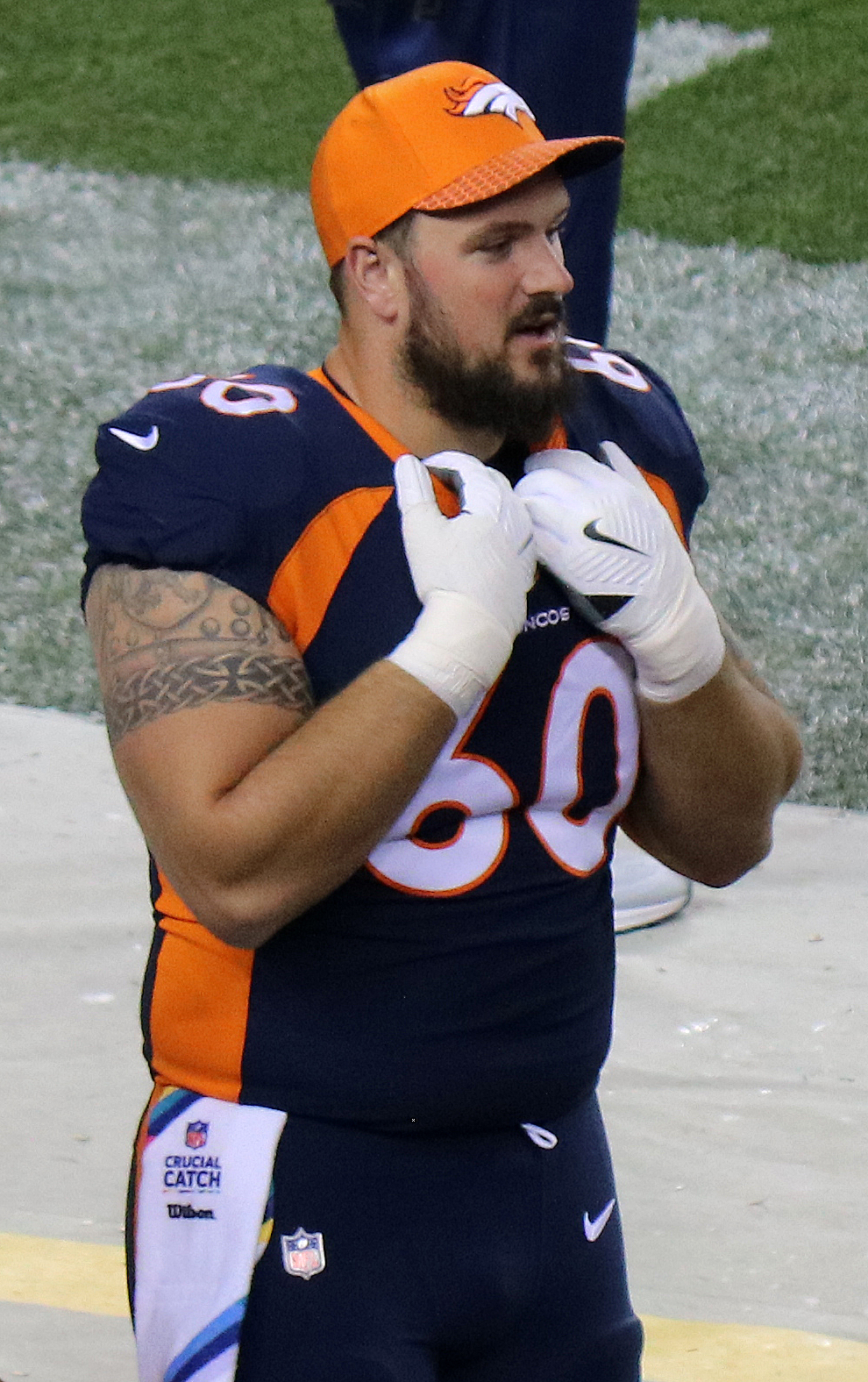
- McGovern with the Denver Broncos in 2017

Profile
- Position: Center

Personal information
- Born: April 27, 1993 (age 33); Fargo, North Dakota, U.S.
- Listed height: 6 ft 4 in (1.93 m)
- Listed weight: 306 lb (139 kg)

Career information
- High school: Shanley (Fargo)
- College: Missouri
- NFL draft: 2016: 5th round, 144th overall pick

Career history
- Denver Broncos (2016–2019); New York Jets (2020–2024); New Orleans Saints (2024); New York Jets (2024)

Career NFL statistics as of 2024
- Games played: 109
- Games started: 96
- Stats at Pro Football Reference

Connor McGovern (born April 27, 1993) is an American professional football center. He played college football for the Missouri Tigers and was selected by the Denver Broncos in the fifth round of the 2016 NFL draft. He has also played in the NFL for the New Orleans Saints.

== Professional career ==
Pre-draft measurables
Height	Weight	Arm length	Hand span	Wingspan	40-yard dash	10-yard split	20-yard split	20-yard shuttle	Three-cone drill	Vertical jump	Broad jump	Bench press
6 ft 4 1/4 in (1.94 m)	306 lb (139 kg)	32 7/8 in (0.84 m)	10 3/8 in (0.26 m)	6 ft 7 1/2 in (2.02 m)	5.11 s	1.73 s	2.93 s	4.65 s	7.50 s	33.0 in (0.84 m)	9 ft 1 in (2.77 m)	33 reps
All values from NFL Combine

=== Denver Broncos ===
McGovern was selected by the Denver Broncos in the fifth round of the 2016 NFL draft with the 144th overall pick.

After not playing in his rookie season, McGovern played in 15 games, starting the final five games of the season at right guard in place of the injured Ronald Leary.

In 2018, McGovern was named the starting right guard to begin the season as Ronald Leary was moved to left guard after beating out incumbent starter Max Garcia. He was moved over to starting center in Week 11 following a season-ending injury to Matt Paradis, and started there the rest of the season.

In 2019, McGovern was named the starting center after Paradis left via free agency, starting all 16 games.

=== New York Jets (first stint) ===
On April 2, 2020, McGovern signed a three-year, $27 million contract with the New York Jets. He started all 16 games at center in 2020.

McGovern entered the 2021 season as the Jets starting center. He suffered a knee injury in Week 16 and was placed on injured reserve on December 27.

McGovern re-signed with the Jets on April 24, 2023. He was named the Jets starting center for 2023, starting the first seven games before being placed on injured reserve on October 31, 2023.

On September 11, 2024, McGovern was signed to the Jets practice squad.

=== New Orleans Saints ===
On October 4, 2024, McGovern was signed by the New Orleans Saints off the Jets practice squad. He played in six games (five starts) for the Saints before he was waived by the team on November 11.

=== New York Jets (second stint) ===
On November 11, 2024, McGovern was claimed off waivers by the New York Jets. He was waived on December 7.

== Personal life ==
In 2020, McGovern married Devin Dilling.

McGovern comes from an affluent family from Fargo, North Dakota, his grandfather Ron Offutt according to a Forbes article titled "The Sultan of Spuds" is one of the wealthiest people in North Dakota. Some of his family members include Griffin Neal (Cousin):, Keith McGovern (Father); President of RD Offutt Company and Ron Offutt (Grandfather). RD Offutt Farms is the primary supplier of frozen french fries for the McDonald's corporation.

Coincidentally, McGovern shares the same name as fellow center Connor McGovern of the Buffalo Bills. The two are not related.
