= Fargo South High School =

Coordinates: 46°51′21″N 96°48′43″W

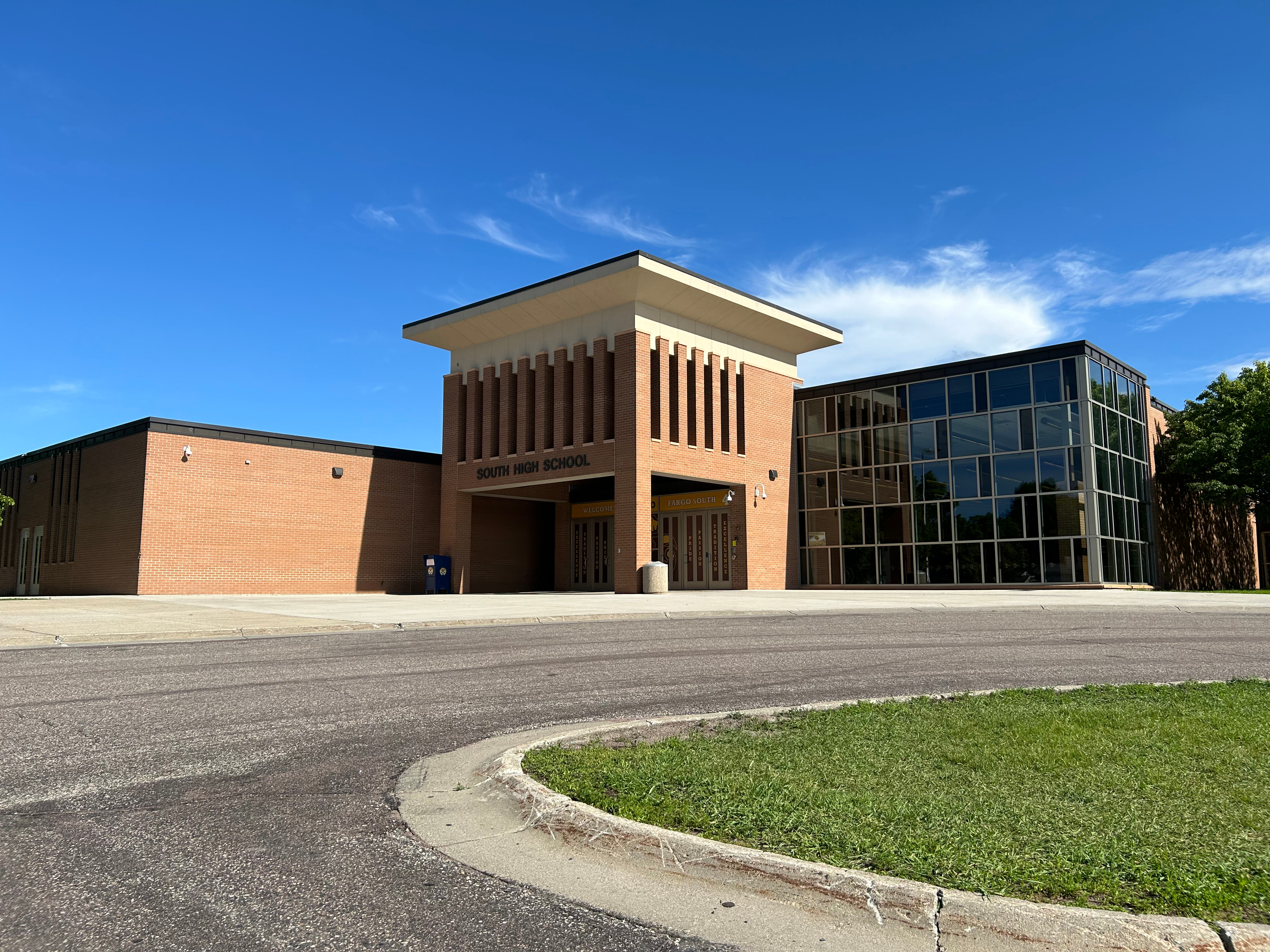

Location
- 1840 15th Ave S Fargo, North Dakota 58103; United States

Information
- Type: Public
- Motto: “Strive for Excellence”
- Established: 1967
- School district: Fargo Public Schools
- Principal: Todd Bertsch
- Teaching staff: 80.00 (FTE)
- Grades: 9–12
- Enrollment: 910 (2023-2024)
- Student to teacher ratio: 11.38
- Colors: Brown and gold
- Mascot: Bruin
- Website: south.fargo.k12.nd.us

Fargo South High School, commonly known as Fargo South, South High, and South, is a public high school in Fargo, North Dakota. It serves about 1,000 students in grades 9-12. The school is a part of the Fargo Public Schools system. The school colors are brown and gold and the athletic teams are known as the Bruins.

== History ==
Fargo South High School was built after Fargo Central High School burned down in 1966. Students from Central High finished the 1965–66 school year at Fargo North High School and spent the 1966–67 school year at North High while the new school was built. It was named South High and the "Bruins" christened their school at the beginning of the 1967–68 school year.

In 1999, the school completed a massive expansion and renovation project. Until 2011, Fargo South High School served the entire Fargo Public School district south of Main Avenue, and once had a student population of over 2,000. Freshmen were served by Discovery Junior High School from 1994 to 2006 and then housed in the former Agassiz Middle School building (termed "South Campus II") from 2006 to 2011. Beginning with the 2011–12 school year, the school population split with the new Fargo Davies High School.

== Students ==
South High's student body is very diverse, including students from Nepal, Vietnam, and several African countries.

== Athletics ==
Fargo South is part of the North Dakota High School Activities Association and has won the following championships:

- State Class 'A' Boys’ Basketball: 1986, 1989, 2005
- State Class 'A' Girls’ Basketball: 1985, 1992, 1994
- State Class 'A' Boys' Cross Country:1985, 1999, 2002, 2003
- State Class 'A' Boys’ Track and Field: 1986, 1987, 1988, 1995, 1996, 2000, 2003, 2013
- State Class 'A' Girls’ Track and Field: 1982, 2001, 2003, 2004, 2007
- State Class 'A' Baseball: 1996, 1998, 2011
- State Class 'A' Football: 1978, 1982, 1986, 1987, 1989, 1990, 1992, 1996, 2022
- State Class 'AAA' Football: 2004, 2006, 2007, 2010, 2013, 2022, 2023
- State Class 'A' Boys' Hockey: 1994, 1999, 2006
- State Class 'A' Cheerleading: 2001, 2004, 2005, 2006, 2008
- State Class 'A' Boys' Tennis: 2015, 2017, 2019

== Clubs and activities ==
Clubs and activities include AFROTC, Art Club, Bike Club, Chess Club, DECA, Debate, Environmental Club, FBLA, French Club, Gaming Club, Geocaching Club, German Club, FCCLA, History Club, Intramurals, Improv Club, International Club, Journalism, Junior Classical League, Key Club, Music (Bands, Choirs, and Orchestra – Various), National Honor Society, Performing Arts, Science Olympiad, Ski/Snowboard Club, Spanish Club, Speech, Congressional Debate, Debate, Student Council, Usher Corps, VICA (SkillsUSA), and Yearbook.

== Notable alumni ==
- Bobby Babich, Defensive Coordinator, Buffalo Bills
- Reina del Cid, musician
- Chris Coste, catcher, Philadelphia Phillies
- CariDee English, model
- Dan Fabian, Minnesota State Representative 1A (2011–2021)
- Tom Hoge, golfer
- P. Casey Pitts, federal judge
- Laura Roesler, runner
- Mac Schneider, politician
- Blaize Shiek, NFL cheerleader
- Drew Wrigley, Lieutenant Governor of North Dakota, U.S. Attorney for the District of North Dakota
