= West Fargo High School =

Public school in North Dakota, USA

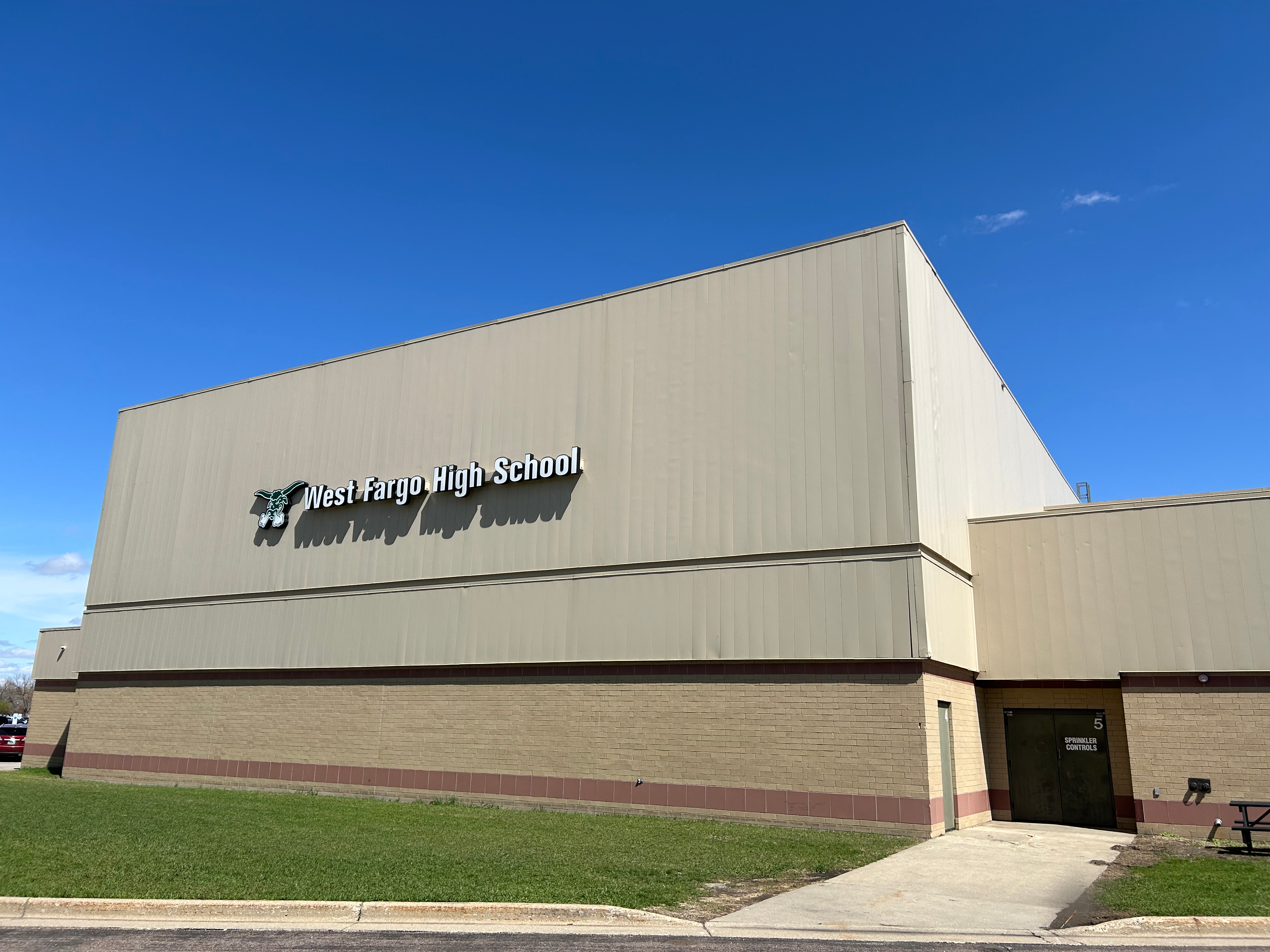

Location
- 801 9th St E Southern West Fargo, just south of Main Street; West Fargo, Cass County, North Dakota 58078; USA; 46°52′03″N 96°52′51″W

Information
- Type: Public
- School district: West Fargo Public Schools
- Principal: Rachel Bachmeier
- Staff: 105.25 (FTE)
- Grades: 9–12
- Enrollment: 1,385 (2024-2025)
- Student to teacher ratio: 13.24
- Language: English
- Schedule: 4 classes per day, A/B day block schedule
- Hours in school day: 7 hours, 10 minutes
- Colors: Green and White
- Song: "Minnesota Rouser"
- Mascot: Packers
- Website: wfhs.web.west-fargo.k12.nd.us

West Fargo High School is a public high school located in West Fargo, North Dakota. It serves about 1,400 students, and is a part of the West Fargo Public Schools system. The school colors are green and white and the athletic teams are known as the Packers. Until 2015, it was the only high school to serve the district. WFHS is the second largest high school in North Dakota as of the 2024–25 school year.

In fall 2007, West Fargo High School freshman began attending the Sheyenne Ninth Grade Center (now known as Sheyenne High School) as a way to handle the increase of students in the district. As of the 2024-2025 school year, West Fargo High and Sheyenne High School both had freshman through senior classes on their campuses.

Covid-19 required the school include hybrid learning with half of their students online.

== Athletics and activities ==
=== North Dakota State Championships ===
- State Class 'A’ Baseball: 2012, 2017
- State Class 'A' boys' basketball: 1983, 1991, 1992, 2021
- State Class 'A' girls' basketball: 1993, 1994, 1998
- State Class 'A' football: 1993
- State Class 'AAA' football: 1998, 1999, 2002, 2003, 2017
- State Class 'A' wrestling: 2006
- State Class 'A' volleyball: 2001
- State Class 'A' boys' swimming: 2009, 2012 (tie with Fargo North), 2024, 2025
- Girls' hockey: 2010
- State Class 'A' boys' Cross Country: 1986
- State Class 'A’ One Act Plays: 2013, 2014, 2015, 2018
- State Class ‘A’ Cheer: 2013,2024

== Music ==
=== Band ===
There are three main band classes in West Fargo High School. One freshman band known as the Concert Band, and two upperclassmen bands known as the Symphonic Band and the Wind Ensemble. There are two jazz bands, "Jazz Band" and "Jazz Ensemble". There are usually four concerts per year for the three main bands. "Fall Concert", "Winter Concert", "Souper Concert", and the "Concert/Symphonic/Wind Ensemble Awards".

== Notable alumni ==
- Anthony W. England, former NASA shuttle astronaut, graduated from West Fargo High School in 1959
- Dane Boedigheimer, filmmaker and YouTuber, creator of the Annoying Orange, graduated in 1997
- Jan Maxwell, Broadway and television actress, graduated in 1974
- Amber Preston, stand-up comedian, graduated in 1996
- Tyler Roehl, football running back, graduated in 2004
- Matt Strahm, relief pitcher for the Philadelphia Phillies, graduated in 2010
- Andy Young, infielder who is a free agent, graduated in 2012
