= Napoleon High School (Napoleon, North Dakota) =

Coordinates: 46°30′24.7″N 99°45′55.2″W

Location
- 615 3rd St E Napoleon, North Dakota 58561; USA

Information
- Type: Public
- Teaching staff: 7.56 (FTE)
- Grades: 7-12
- Enrollment: 110 (2023–2024)
- Student to teacher ratio: 14.55
- Colors: Royal blue and gold
- Mascot: Imperial
- Website: Napoleon High School

Napoleon High School is a public high school located in Napoleon, North Dakota. It currently serves about 119 students. The athletic teams are known as the Imperials, and the school colors are royal blue and gold.

== Athletics ==
=== Championships ===
- North Dakota nine-man high school football: 1975, 2006, 2011
- North Dakota Class B high school wrestling: 1975, 1980, 1981, 1982, 1989, 1990, 1997, 2002, 2003, 2004, 2005, 2006, 2007
- North Dakota Class B boys' track champions: 1979
