= Century High School (Bismarck, North Dakota) =

Coordinates: 46°50′21″N 100°46′38″W

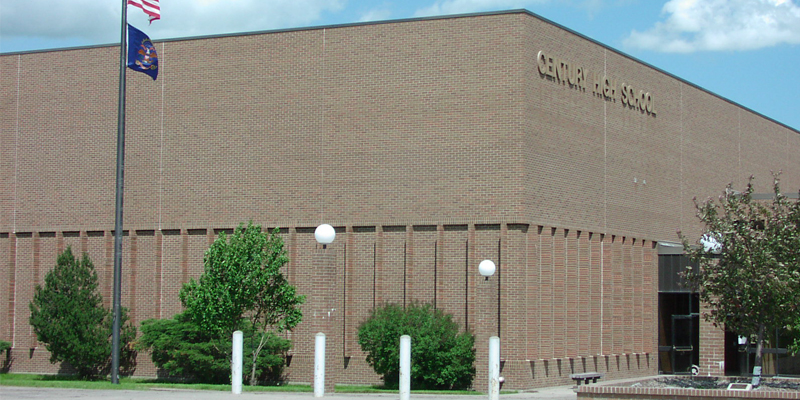

Location
- 1000 East Century Avenue; Bismarck, North Dakota 58503; United States

Information
- Type: Public high school
- Motto: Character, Honor, Success.
- Established: 1976
- School board: Bismarck Public Schools School Board
- School district: Bismarck Public Schools
- NCES District ID: 3800014
- NCES School ID: 380001400047
- Principal: Steve Madler
- Teaching staff: 84.05 (on an FTE basis)
- Grades: 9–12
- Enrollment: 1,401 (2023–2024)
- Student to teacher ratio: 16.67
- Schedule: Periods
- Colors: Red, white, and blue
- Mascot: Patriot
- Publication: 'Riot Literary Magazine
- Newspaper: Century Star
- Yearbook: Spirit Yearbook
- Feeder schools: Horizon Middle School
- Website: chs.bismarckschools.org

Century High School (CHS) is a public high school located in Bismarck, North Dakota. It serves 1,346 students and is part of the Bismarck Public Schools system. The principal is Steve Madler. The school colors are red, white, and blue. Century's mascot is the Patriot.

The school was built on reclaimed land from Bismarck's landfill in 1975 and was renovated and expanded in 1998. It is one of three public high schools in the city of Bismarck. Century serves the northwest region of the city. It supports many extracurricular activities. Among these are several sports teams, pre-professional organizations, string orchestras, bands, and choirs.

== Athletics ==
=== Championships ===
- State Class 'A' boys' basketball: 1984, 2011, 2018
- State Class 'A' baseball: 2018, 2019
- State Class 'A' girls' basketball: 1990, 2009, 2012, 2013
- State Class 'A' wrestling: 1987, 1988, 1990, 1994, 1995, 2001
- State Class 'A' girls' track and field: 1999, 2005, 2011, 2012, 2013
- State Class 'A' volleyball: 1983, 2008, 2012, 2015
- State girls' swimming and diving: 1993 2009, 2010
- State boys' swimming and diving: 2013, 2014, 2015, 2016
- State girls' soccer: 1998, 2001, 2002, 2003, 2007, 2011
- State boys' soccer: 2007, 2011, 2012, 2013
- State boys' golf: 1978, 2013
- State boys' football: 2015, 2016, 2019, 2020
- State boys' track and field: 2015, 2016, 2018, 2019, 2020
- State boys' cross country: 2016, 2017, 2019
- State girls' cross country: 2014

== Honors ==
The school's literary magazine is the Lit Mag, the newspaper is the Century Star, and the yearbook is the Century Spirit. These student-run publications have all been recognized by the National Scholastic Press Association as being among the top scholastic publications in the country.

In 2008, Century's chamber orchestra was selected to perform at the national convention of the American String Teachers' Association in Albuquerque, New Mexico.

== Notable alumni ==
- Michelle Axtman, pilot and member of the North Dakota Senate
- Paula Broadwell, author and extramarital partner of David Petraeus
- Cara Mund, Miss America 2018
- Carmen Berg, Playboy Playmate in July 1987
- Gregory Rohde, Assistant Secretary of Commerce and Administrator of the National Telecommunications and Information Administration during the Clinton administration
- Todd Schmitz, swimming coach
- Carson Wentz, quarterback for the Minnesota Vikings
