= Mass media in the Bismarck metropolitan area =

The following is a list of media in Bismarck, North Dakota, United States:

== Print ==
The only daily newspaper in Bismarck is the Bismarck Tribune. The paper was established in 1873 and is the oldest continuing business in the city. The Tribune is the official newspaper of the city of Bismarck, Burleigh County, and the state of North Dakota. The daily newspapers of other major cities in North Dakota are also available at area newsstands.

== Television ==
=== Over the air ===
There are five television stations based in Bismarck, and all of them have rebroadcasters in Minot, Williston, and Dickinson. The stations include:

Channels		Call sign	Branding	Network	Owner
Virtual	Physical	Call sign	Branding	Network	Owner
3	22	KBME-TV	Prairie Public	PBS	Prairie Public Broadcasting
5	31	KFYR-TV	KFYR-TV; NBC North Dakota	NBC; Fox on DT2	Gray Television
12	12	KXMB-TV	KXMB CBS 12; KX Television	CBS; The CW on DT2	Nexstar Media Group
17	17	KBMY	KBMY 17	ABC	Forum Communications
26	26	KNDB	N/A	Heroes & Icons	Legacy Broadcasting

=== Cable television ===
These are locally produced cable television stations carried on the Midcontinent Communications cable system in Bismarck:

Cable Channel	Call sign/Name	Programming	City based in
2	Government Access	Government-access television operated by Dakota Media Access	Bismarck
12	Community Access	Public-access television operated by Dakota Media Access	Bismarck
14	KWMK	The CW Plus operated by Midcontinent Communications	Bismarck
18		Weather Radar with NOAA Service weather radio	Bismarck

== Radio ==
Bismarck is home to a number of radio stations. All of the commercial stations are owned by either Clear Channel Communications or Townsquare Media. Many of the lower frequency stations are broadcasters of national Christian radio networks. The local stations include:

FM Frequencies

- KBMK 88.3 FM (Contemporary Christian music) K-Love network affiliate
- K204FG 88.7 FM (Christian) BBN translator
- KLBF 89.1 FM (Contemporary Christian music) K-Love affiliate for nearby Lincoln
- KNRI 89.7 FM (Christian rock) Air 1 affiliate
- KCND 90.5 FM (Public Radio) Prairie Public
- K216FK 91.1 FM (Spanish-language Christian) La Nueva Radio Cristiana Translator
- KXRP 91.3 FM (Christian) American Family Radio affiliate
- KYYY 92.9 FM (Top 40/CHR) "Y93"
- KBEP-LP 93.7 FM (Christian) 3ABN affiliate
- KQDY 94.5 FM (Country) "KQ 94.5"
- KBYZ 96.5 FM (Mainstream rock) "The Walleye"
- KKCT 97.5 FM (Top 40/CHR) "Hot 97-5"
- KACL 98.7 FM (Classic Hits) "Cool 98.7"
- K259AF 99.7 FM (News/Talk/Sports) KFYR-AM translator "K-Fire"
- KLBE-LP 100.7 FM (Christian rock) "Club Radio"
- KSSS 101.5 FM (Mainstream rock) "Rock 101"
- KUSB 103.3 FM (Country) "US 103.3"
- KNDR 104.7 FM (Contemporary Christian music)
- KKBO 105.9 FM (Country) "105.9 The Big Rig"
- KJIT-LP 106.7 FM (Contemporary Christian music) Radio 74 Internationale affiliate
- KXRV 107.5 (Classic Hits) "Mojo 107.5"

AM Frequencies

- KFYR 550 AM (News/Talk/Sports/Oldies/Classic Hits/Top 40/CHR) "K-Fire 550"
- KXMR 710 AM (Sports) "ESPN 710"
- KBMR 1130 AM (Classic country) "Bismarck's original country station"
- KLXX 1270 AM (Talk)
- KDKT 1410 AM (Sports) "Fox Sports Radio 1410"
- WQDL503 1610 AM (Traveler's Information Station), North Dakota Department of Transportation

== See also ==
- List of television stations in North Dakota
