= KFYR =

KFYR may refer to:

- KFYR (AM), a radio station (550 AM) licensed to Bismarck, North Dakota, United States
- KFYR-TV, a television station (channel 5 analog/31 digital) licensed to Bismarck, North Dakota, United States
- KYYY, a radio station (92.9 FM) licensed to Bismarck, North Dakota, United States, which formerly used the call sign KFYR-FM
