= Modular scheduling =

Modular scheduling (also known as flex scheduling, flexible modular scheduling, or modular flex scheduling) is a system of timetabling in certain high schools in the United States.

== History ==
Modular scheduling was developed by schools such as the Kent State University School in the 1960s. About 15% of American high schools implemented it in the 1960s, but since the 1970s, the practice has waned in popularity as schools have implemented block scheduling instead.

== Characteristics ==
Each module, or "mod" (as it known colloquially), is either a 20 or 40-minute period used for classes or independent study time. This allows freedom in scheduling as classes can be 40, 60, or 80 minutes long, as needed for one-to one, small group, large group, and laboratory instruction. Classes are taught in a similar format to many universities; students meet a large group lecture once per week and have small group recitations throughout the week. An average student has at least one or two full open mods (free periods) per day, that can be used for studying, interacting with teachers, eating lunch, or socializing.

Since modular scheduling leaves students with a relatively large amount of unstructured time outside of classes, some schools also adopt open campus policies. At Westside High School in Omaha, Nebraska, which has used a modular schedule since 1967, juniors and seniors who have met specific requirements are eligible to apply for a pass that allows them to leave the building during open mods. When Covington Catholic High School implemented a modular schedule in 1968, it also extended off-campus privileges to all students, encouraging them to visit community institutions such as libraries. However, the policy proved controversial; after a change in management, the school limited off-campus privileges to seniors in good standing.

== Specific implementations ==
=== Ursuline modular schedule ===
During the 1970s, Ursuline Academy in Cincinnati switched to a modular schedule. This consists of 6 days (lettered A-F) each with 18 modules. Each mod is 20 min, with a 3 min passing time between each one added in 2004. Classes range from 2-4 modules long. Students say that the schedule works very well in helping them with time management and responsibility.

Each also has a certain number of free mods each day to eat, study, do homework, work in the library, or socialize. As the choice of classes becomes more open to each student, free mods become more abundant. A typical student would have between 21 and 40 free mods a cycle, depending on the number of classes taken.

Different schedule days are set up so that mods can be shortened, (to incorporate time for a pep rally, department meeting, etc.) but are never skipped.

=== Incarnate Word High School ===
At the Incarnate Word High School San Antonio, Texas classes run on a modular schedule. Each day is broken down into 18 time-periods called "mods." Mods are approximately 20 minutes long. Each subject will be 2 mods in duration with some (such as Science courses with labs or Advanced Placement courses spanning 3 modules). The schedule is on a two-week cycle. There are no bells between mods, and students are responsible for arriving to classes on time. Students and faculty also have mods without classes, called open labs, which are to be used as "study" periods. This schedule encourages personal responsibility and aids in preparation for a college schedule.

=== Legacy High School ===
At Legacy High School in Bismarck, North Dakota, every week consists of 5 days each with their own individual schedules for staff and students which repeat the following week. Each day is broken down into twenty-two 20-minute mods during which classes take place. Normal academic classes can be between 2-4 mods ranging from 40 to 80 minutes, which are colloquially called "40s", "60s", and 80s". When students have no classes at a given time in their schedule, it is called Saber Time (after the school's mascot), during which students are expected to use the time to study, catch up on homework for classes, or eat lunch. Staff at Legacy have similar "prep time" during which they are able to prepare for upcoming classes or grade.

Legacy has an open campus policy, which allows sophomores and higher to leave the school during their Saber Time, usually to return home for rest or to get food outside of school for lunch.
