= Sertoma Park =

Sertoma Park may refer to several parks in the United States:

- Sertoma Park (Bismarck, North Dakota)
- Sertoma Park (Grand Forks, North Dakota)
- Sertoma Park (Sioux Falls, South Dakota)
- Sertoma Park (Provo, Utah)
