= James Kasper =

American politician (born 1945)

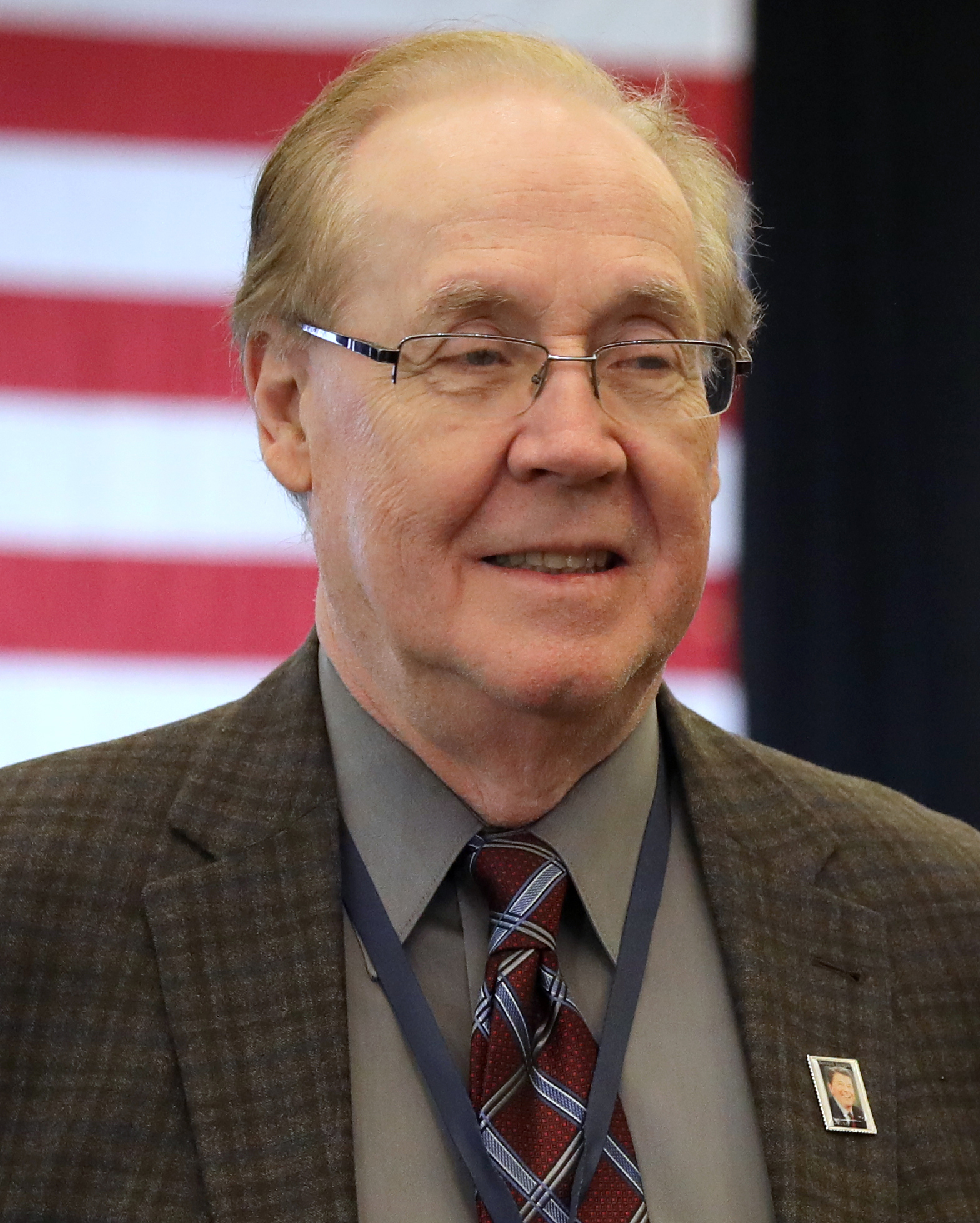

Member of the North Dakota House of Representatives from the 46th district
- Incumbent
- Assumed office 2001

Personal details
- Born: May 17, 1945 (age 81) Neosho, Missouri, U.S.
- Party: Republican
- Spouse: Sandy
- Children: 2

James Kasper (born May 17, 1945) is an American politician. He is a member of the North Dakota House of Representatives from the 46th District, serving since 2000. He is a member of the Republican Party.

In February 2019, Kasper praised Bismarck mayor Steve Bakken as "sort of a redneck" in a debate on the House floor, which Bakken took "as a badge of honor."

In May, 2025, Kasper suffered a brain bleed; he was transported to a hospital in Bismark, SD, but returned to Fargo during the closing of the legislative session.
