= Warford =

Warford may refer to:

Places

- Great Warford, Macclesfield, Cheshire, England, United Kingdom
- Little Warford, Macclesfield, Cheshire, England, United Kingdom

People

- Larry Warford (born 1991), American football guard
- John Warford (born 1947), mayor of Bismarck, North Dakota
