= Apple Valley, North Dakota =

- CDP & Unincorporated community
- Interactive map of Apple Valley, North Dakota
- Location within North Dakota
- Coordinates: 46.8210°N 100.5995°W
- Country: United States
- State: North Dakota
- County: Burleigh
- Township: Gibbs

Area
  - Total: 0.148 sq mi (0.383 km^{2})
  - Land: 0.148 sq mi (0.383 km^{2})
  - Water: 0 sq mi (0.000 km^{2}) 0.00%
- Elevation: 1,670 ft (510 m)

Population (2020)
  - Total: 194
  - Estimate (2025): 220
  - Density: 1,310/sq mi (507/km^{2})
- Time zone: UTC–6 (Central (CST))
  - Summer (DST): UTC–5 (CDT)
- ZIP Code: 58558
- Area code: 701
- FIPS code: 38-02820
- GNIS feature ID: 2812804
- Highway: County Highway 10

Apple Valley is a census-designated place (CDP) and unincorporated community in Burleigh County, North Dakota, United States. The population was 194 as of the 2020 census, and was estimated at 220 in 2025. It is 9 miles (14 km) east of Bismarck, the state capital.

It was first listed as a CDP prior to the 2020 census. The CDP is in southwestern Burleigh County, in the southeast part of Gibbs Township. It is on the south side of County Highway 10 (former U.S. Route 10). The CDP is on the north side of the valley of Apple Creek, a southwest-flowing tributary of the Missouri River.

== Geography ==
According to the United States Census Bureau, the CDP has a total area of 0.148 square miles (0.38 km^{2}), all land.

== Demographics ==
Historical population
Census	Pop.	Note	%±
2020	194		—
2025 (est.)	220		13.4%
U.S. Decennial Census; 2020 Census

As of the 2024 American Community Survey, there were 72 estimated households in Apple Valley with an average of 3.88 persons per household. The CDP has a median household income of $111,136. Approximately 0.0% of the CDP's population lives at or below the poverty line. Apple Valley has an estimated 74.0% employment rate, with 39.4% of the population holding a bachelor's degree or higher and 92.7% holding a high school diploma. There were 72 housing units at an average density of 486.49 per square mile (187.8/km^{2}).

The top five reported languages (people were allowed to report up to two languages, thus the figures will generally add to more than 100%) were English (98.2%), Spanish (0.0%), Indo-European (1.8%), Asian and Pacific Islander (0.0%), and Other (0.0%).

The median age in the CDP was 21.6 years.

Apple Valley, North Dakota racial and ethnic composition Note: the US Census treats Hispanic/Latino as an ethnic category. This table excludes Latinos from the racial categories and assigns them to a separate category. Hispanics/Latinos may be of any race.
Race	Number	Percent
White alone (NH)	185	95.36%
Black or African American alone (NH)	1	0.52%
Native American or Alaska Native alone (NH)	1	0.52%
Asian alone (NH)	0	0.00%
Pacific Islander alone (NH)	0	0.00%
Other race alone (NH)	0	0.00%
Mixed race or multiracial (NH)	6	3.09%
Hispanic or Latino (any race)	1	0.52%
Total	194	100.00%

=== 2020 census ===
As of the 2020 census, there were 194 people, 74 households, and 64 families residing in the CDP. The population density was 1,310.81 inhabitants per square mile (506.11/km^{2}). There were 74 housing units at an average density of 500.00 per square mile (193.05/km^{2}). The racial makeup of the CDP was 95.88% White, 0.52% African American, 0.52% Native American, 0.00% Asian, 0.00% Pacific Islander, 0.00% from some other races and 3.09% from two or more races. Hispanic or Latino people of any race were 0.52% of the population.

== Education ==
The Bismarck Public School District 1 was founded and organized in 1874.

The area is served by the Bismarck Public School District 1. It operates the Bismarck School. In the 2025-26 academic year, the district reported a total of 14,018 students.

Residents are zoned to Murphy Elementary School, Simle Middle School, and Legacy High School.
