= KLBE =

KLBE may refer to:

- KLBE-LP, a low-power radio station (100.7 FM) licensed to Bismarck, North Dakota, United States
- the ICAO code for Arnold Palmer Regional Airport
