= Steve Bakken =

American politician

Mayor of Bismarck
- In office June 26, 2018 – June 28, 2022
- Preceded by: Mike Seminary
- Succeeded by: Mike Schmitz

Personal details
- Born: 1968 (age 57–58) Grand Forks, North Dakota, U.S.
- Party: Republican
- Spouse: Wendy
- Education: University of North Dakota (BA)

Steven Bakken (born 1968) is an American politician and radio host. He was the mayor of Bismarck, North Dakota.

== Early life and business career ==
Bakken is a native of Grand Forks, North Dakota. He began his career as a radio host at the age of 12. Bakken attended the University of North Dakota. He spent time in several major markets during his radio career. After returning to North Dakota, he served as host of “What's on your mind?” and “Energy Matters” on KFYR 550. Bakken served as the business development manager for Larson Engineering and owner of SB Productions. He moved to Bismarck in 2011. Bakken met his wife, Wendy, a teacher in the Bismarck Public School District.

== Political career ==
In 2016, Bakken entered the Republican nomination race for the District 32 House seat. The seat was formerly held by Mark Dosch, who moved to District 30. According to Bakken, his top priorities were improvements to education as well as reining in the state's budget and not relying too heavily on oil revenues.

In January 2018, Bakken announced he was running for mayor of Bismarck against the incumbent Mike Seminary. He was elected in June 2018 with 57.95 percent of the vote, and took over two weeks later. As mayor, Bakken helped change how projects with the water commission were funded, relying less on taxpayers, and called this his greatest achievement in his first year. He also was involved in development along the riverfront, and integrating the University of Mary into the city more, with the use by the university of its public health building. In February 2019, state representative Jim Kasper praised Bakken as "sort of a redneck" in a debate on the House floor, which Bakken took "as a badge of honor." He opposes refugee resettlement in Bismarck. Bakken argued that homeless veterans were more deserving of help than refugees. Bakken stated Burleigh County did not receive enough information before their vote on the matter.

In March 2020, Bakken signed an emergency declaration due to the coronavirus pandemic, allowing the city to access state and federal funding. He signed an extension to the emergency declaration on May 14, extending until June 13.

He was defeated for reelection in 2022 by Mike Schmitz.

In September 2023, Bakken was appointed to an open position on the Burleigh County Commission. At his first meeting as Commissioner, other members of the body selected him as chair.

Political offices
Preceded by Mike Seminary	Mayor of Bismarck; 2018–2022	Succeeded by Mike Schmitz
