= KSSS =

Radio station in Bismarck, North Dakota

Coordinates: 46.942°N 100.694°W

Bismarck, North Dakota; United States
- Broadcast area: Bismarck-Mandan
- Frequency: 101.5 MHz
- Branding: Rock 101

Programming
- Format: Active rock

Ownership
- Owner: iHeartMedia, Inc.; (iHM Licenses, LLC)
- Sister stations: KBMR, KFYR, KQDY, KXMR, KYYY

History
- First air date: August 1, 1994
- Call sign meaning: "Kiss" (former branding)

Technical information
- Licensing authority: FCC
- Facility ID: 2210
- Class: C
- ERP: 100,000 watts
- HAAT: 301 meters (988 ft)

Links
- Public license information: Public file; LMS
- Webcast: Listen Live
- Website: 1015.iheart.com

KSSS (101.5 FM), known as "Rock 101", is a radio station in Bismarck, North Dakota, owned by iHeartMedia, Inc. The station airs active rock and primarily competes against Townsquare Media's classic rock KBYZ "96.5 The Walleye".

iHeartMedia, Inc. also owns KFYR 550 (News/Talk), KXMR 710 (Sports), KBMR 1130 (Classic country), KYYY 92.9 (pop), and KQDY 94.5 (Country) in the Bismarck-Mandan area.

== History ==
KSSS aired an adult contemporary format as "Kiss 101.5" until 2001, when it switched to classic rock as "Kiss 101", before switching back to an AC format as "Star 101", and returning to classic rock as "101.5 A Rock & Roll Station". The station tweaked its music and imaging as "Rock 101" in 2005.

By the summer of 2011, "Rock 101" tweaked to a full blown mainstream rock format playing a mix of classic rock and rock from the 1970s, 1980s, 1990s, 2000s, to current active rock music.
