= Gibbs Township, North Dakota =

- Township
- Logo

- Location within North Dakota
- Coordinates: 46°51′08″N 100°36′46″W
- Country: United States
- State: North Dakota
- County: Burleigh

Area
  - Total: 34.90 sq mi (90.39 km^{2})
  - Land: 34.88 sq mi (90.35 km^{2})
  - Water: 0.015 sq mi (0.04 km^{2})
- Elevation: 1,785 ft (544 m)

Population (2020)
  - Total: 2,793
  - Density: 80.06/sq mi (30.91/km^{2})
- Time zone: UTC-6 (Central (CST))
  - Summer (DST): UTC-5 (CDT)
- Area code: 701
- FIPS code: 38-30140
- GNIS feature ID: 1037185
- Website: gibbsburleightownship.org

Gibbs Township is a township in Burleigh County, North Dakota, United States. The population was 2,793 at the 2020 census.

The census-designated place of Apple Valley is located in southeastern Gibbs Township.

== Geography ==
Gibbs Township has a total area of 34.901 square miles (90.39 km^{2}), of which 34.886 square miles (90.35 km^{2}) is land and 0.015 square miles (0.039 km^{2}) is water.

=== Major highways ===
- I-94

== Demographics ==
As of the 2023 American Community Survey, there were an estimated 908 households.
