= Linnea Glatt =

American artist

Linnea Glatt is an artist born in Bismarck, North Dakota in 1949. Glatt graduated with a Bachelor's from Moorhead State University (Minnesota) in 1971 and then went on to receive a Master's from the University of Dallas (Texas) in 1972. She became an art instructor at Richland College and taught from 1974 to 1984. In 1985, she began teaching at Southern Methodist University (SMU) until 1988.

As a post-modern sculptor and installationist, Glatt has worked on numerous public art installations including "Passage Inacheve" (1990) located at Buffalo Bayou, Houston, Texas (1990), and "Harrow" (1992) located in Dallas, TX at the Lubben Plaza. After focusing on large-scale public art sculptures in the 1980s and 1990s, Glatt has returned to a studio-based practice where she continues to focus on placemaking. Her practice is inspired by her childhood memories of growing up in North Dakota.

== Awards ==
Glatt's awards include Dallas Center for Contemporary Art Legend Award, Art Matters Individual Artist Fellowship, National Endowment for the Arts Visual Artist Fellowship Grant, and The Arch and Anne Giles Kimbrough Fund.
