= List of mayors of Bismarck, North Dakota =

The following is a complete list of the mayors of Bismarck, North Dakota. Since 1909, Bismarck has operated under the city commission form of government, with the mayor serving as president and first among equals of the commission.

#	Mayor	Term
1	Edmond Hackett	1875
2	John A. Mclean	1875–1877
3	George Peoples	1877–1881
4	R. B. Thurston	1881–1882
5	James W Raymond	1882–1884
6	John P. Dunn	1884–1885
7	John E. Carland	1885–1886
8	Israel P Hunt	1886–1887
9	William A. Bently	1887–1890
10	Isaac P. Baker	1890–1891
11	William A. Bently	1891–1892
12	Edward S. Allen	1892–1894
13	Albert N. Leslie	1894–1896
14	Edward G. Patterson	1896–1900
15	Francis H. Register	1901–1905
16	William H. Webb	1905–1907
17	Francis R. Smyth	1907–1909
18	Erastus A. Williams	1909–1913
19	Arthur W. Lucas	1913–1921
20	Amil P. Lenhart	1921–1937
21	Obert A. Olson	1937–1938
22	Neil Churchill	1939–1946
23	Amil P. Lenhart	1946–1950
24	Thomas S. Kleppe	1950–1954
25	Evan Lips	1954–1966
26	Ed V. Lahr	1966–1974
27	Robert O. Heskin	1974–1978
28	Eugene Leary	1978–1986
29	Marlan Haakenson	1986–1990
30	Bill Sorensen	1990–2002
31	John Warford	2002–2014
32	Mike Seminary	2014–2018
33	Steve Bakken	2018–2022
34	Mike Schmitz	2022–present
