= John Warford =

American politician

Mayor of Bismarck
- In office 2002–2014
- Preceded by: Bill Sorensen
- Succeeded by: Mike Seminary

Personal details
- Born: 1946 (age 79–80)
- Party: Republican

John Warford (born 1946) is the former mayor of Bismarck, North Dakota. He was elected to office in 2002, was re-elected in 2006 and again in 2010, leaving office in 2014. Although the mayor's office is officially non-partisan, Warford identifies himself as Republican.

Warford attended the University of Minnesota. At Minnesota, he was an All-American hurdler for the Golden Gophers track and field team, finishing 8th in the 110 m hurdles at the 1968 NCAA University Division outdoor track and field championships.

Dr. Warford is also an orthodontist, and was previously the president of the North Dakota Dental Association. He served on the Bismarck Municipal Airport Planning Committee and the University of Mary Executive Operations Committee of the Emerging Leaders in Health Care.

Dr. Warford has resided in Bismarck since 1973 and is married with four children.
