= Bismarck-Mandan Symphony Orchestra =

Community orchestra in North Dakota, US

The Bismarck-Mandan Symphony Orchestra is a community orchestra based out of Bismarck, North Dakota, and performs in the Belle Mehus Auditorium.
