= Mike Schmitz (politician) =

American politician

Mayor of Bismarck
- Incumbent
- Assumed office June 28, 2022
- Preceded by: Steve Bakken

Personal details
- Born: 1961 or 1962 (age 63–64) Fargo, North Dakota, U.S.
- Party: Independent
- Spouse: Janel
- Education: University of Mary (BS, MBA)
- Website: Campaign website

Mike Schmitz (born 1961/1962) is a business leader and certified public accountant who has served as mayor of Bismarck, North Dakota, since 2022.

== Early life and education ==
Schmitz was born in Fargo, North Dakota. He moved to Bismarck at the age of 10. He earned a Bachelor of Science in business administration and accounting in 1984 from the University of Mary, and later a Master of Business Administration, also from the University of Mary.

== Career ==
Schmitz currently works as a certified public accountant in Bismarck. He ran for mayor of Bismarck against incumbent Steve Bakken. The election was held on June 14, 2022. Schmitz won the election with 58.9% of the vote and assumed office on June 28, 2022. His current term ends on June 30, 2026.

Political offices
Preceded by Steve Bakken	Mayor of Bismarck; 2022–present	Incumbent
