= Legacy High School (North Dakota) =

Public high school in Bismarck, North Dakota

Location
- 3400 East Calgary Avenue; Bismarck, North Dakota 58503; United States; 46°50′45.0168″N 100°44′22.3961″W

Information
- Type: Public high school
- Established: 2012; 12 years ago
- Status: Opened in 2015; 9 years ago
- School district: Bismarck Public Schools
- NCES District ID: 3800014
- NCES School ID: 380001400866
- Principal: Tom Schmidt
- Teaching staff: 87.00 (FTE)
- Grades: 9-12
- Enrollment: 1,411 (2023–2024)
- Student to teacher ratio: 16.22
- Schedule: Modular
- Campus size: 289,000 square feet
- Colors: Vegas gold, white, and black
- Mascot: Saber
- National ranking: 7,576
- Feeder schools: Simle Middle School
- Website: https://www.bismarckschools.org/LHS

Legacy High School (LHS) is a public high school located in Bismarck, North Dakota. Legacy was founded following a $55 million bond approval in 2012, with students attending classes at other locations run by Bismarck Public Schools while the campus was under construction. Before Legacy was established, the last public high school to open in Bismarck was Century High School in 1975. The school has a graduation rate of 96%.

In addition to sections of Bismarck, its boundary includes Apple Valley.

== History ==
Legacy High School was established with the passage of a $55 million bond for the school's construction in 2012. In the 2013–2014 school year while the school was under construction, freshmen attended classes at the Bismarck State College Career Academy. During the following year, freshmen and sophomores were moved to the Hughes Education Center, the central administration building for Bismarck Public Schools. Finally, in the 2015–2016 school year, students attended school in the finished campus at 3400 East Calgary Avenue.

In the 2016–2017 school year, Legacy had its first graduating class.

== Activities ==
=== Athletics ===
Legacy has a track, football, and soccer field just off the main campus, as well as other sports fields sponsored by Sanford Health built neighboring the school. Legacy is a member of the Western Dakota Association and participates in WDA events yearly.

==== Unified Inclusive Sports ====
Inclusive sports at Legacy allows students of all abilities to participate on the same team for sports like flag football, bowling, and whiffle ball.

=== Fine arts ===
Legacy offers support for the fine arts in both extracurriculars (debate, drama, speech), and offers band, choir, and orchestra classes for credit in a dedicated wing. Legacy was the first in the Bismarck public school district to have a dedicated orchestra room.

=== Student organizations ===
Legacy has over 10 student extracurricular organizations for students to participate in outside of normal school hours, including the school's own esports league, HOSA, FCA, Science Olympiad, and DECA.

==== Science Olympiad ====
Legacy's Science Olympiad (SciOly) program competes yearly in Science Olympiad competitions for science and engineering. Legacy has previously won in the 2019 and 2021 state competitions, though lost in the 2022 competition.

==== LHS Historical Society ====
In 2022, the LHS Historical Society (LHSHS) entered a group website submission into the National History Day in North Dakota virtual event and won, going onto the national competition where they competed but did not win.
