= Bismarck Air Museum =

Coordinates: 46°46′49.3″N 100°45′44.2″W

The Bismarck Air Museum was a failed effort to preserve the large municipal hangar, known as Hangar #5, at the Bismarck Municipal Airport in Bismarck, North Dakota and redevelop it into a museum. In the 1930s and 1940s a terminal building, a large hangar and the runways were constructed as a part of the Works Progress Administration (WPA) airport development project. Hangar #5 was the last remaining evidence of this effort and it was the goal of the Bismarck Air Museum Foundation to preserve this structure and create an aviation venue for Central and Western North Dakota.

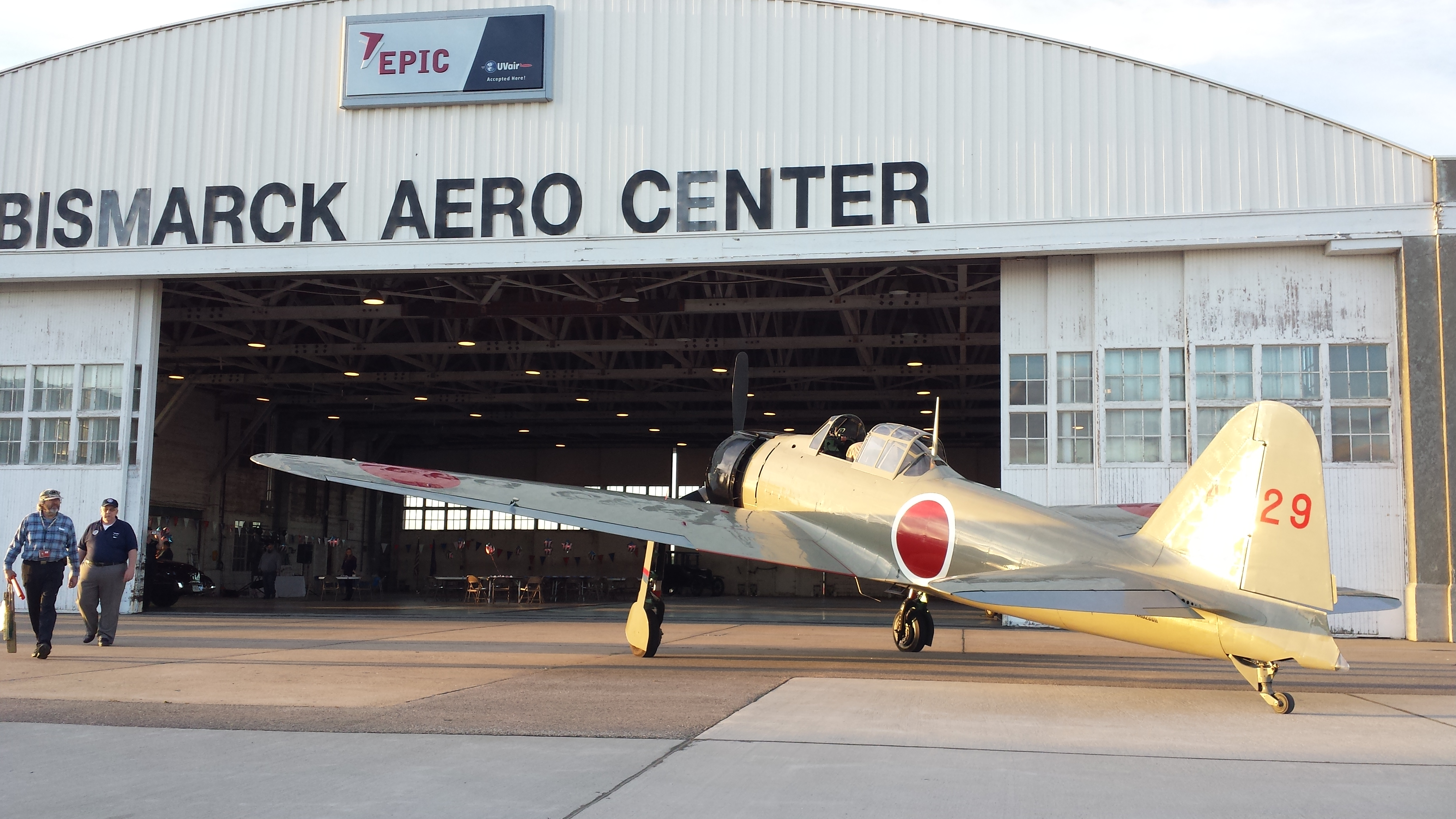
Japanese Zero meets the Hangar #5

== History ==
The first terminal building was constructed in 1936, as a part of WPA project and the large municipal hangar (Now Hangar #5) was completed as a WPA project in 1940. The first paved runways were constructed in 1940 as a part of a WPA program of airport development.

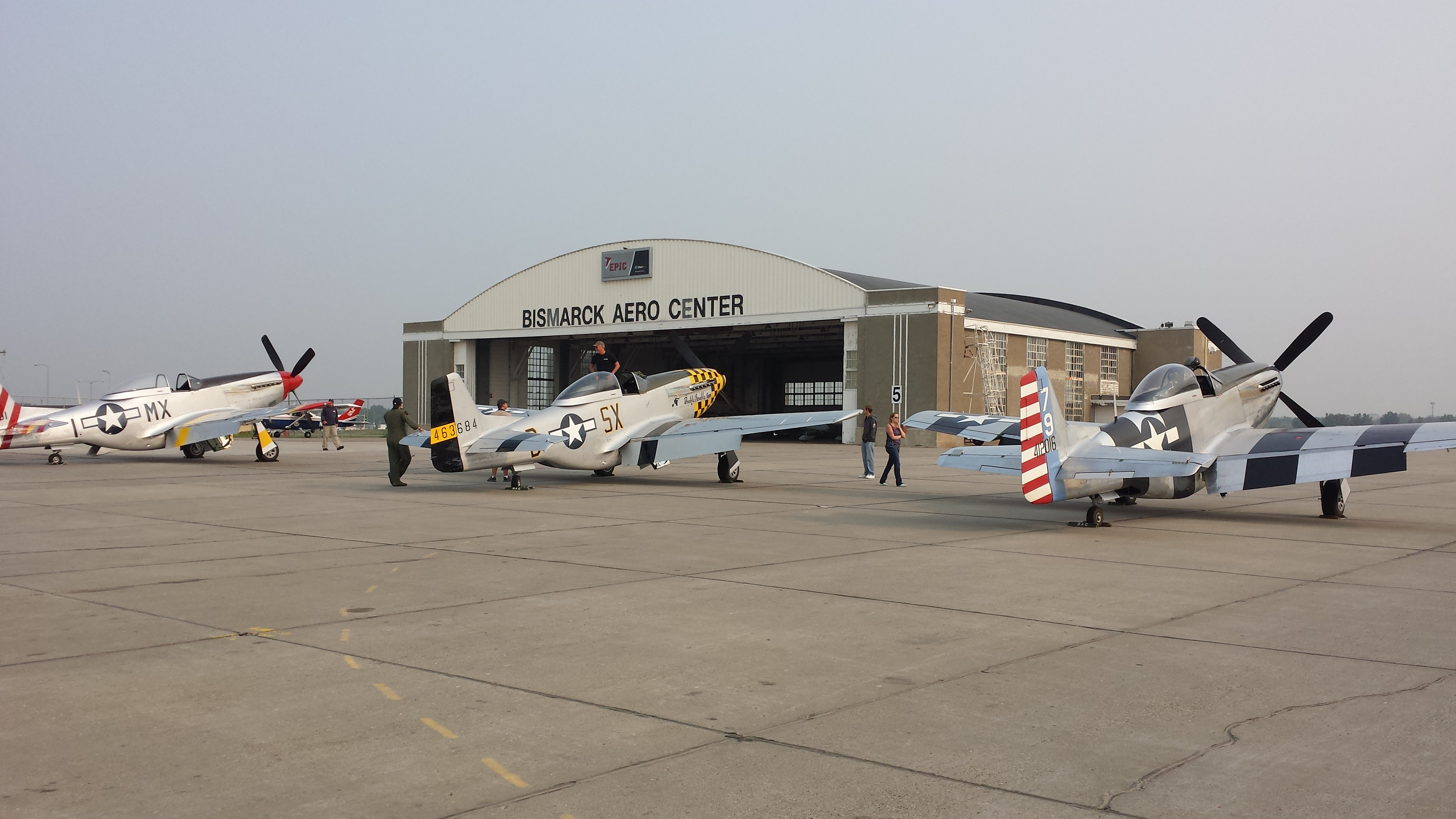
Three North American P-51 Mustangs

The first control tower was mounted on a truck body and raised on a platform. The second control tower was an addition to the (old) terminal building. A replacement control tower was eventually added to the northeast corner of hangar #5.

The 7th Ferry Command of the U.S. Army Air Corps used the airport from 1943 to 1946. The land on which the main terminal is now located was formerly part of Fort Lincoln. It was given to the city in 1946, for airport purposes.

Fundraising efforts for the museum stalled during the COVID-19 Pandemic, and Hangar #5 was demolished on April 24, 2024, to make way for improvements to the airport.
