= KNDR =

Coordinates: 46.586°N 100.806°W

United States
- Broadcast area: Bismarck-Mandan
- Frequency: 104.7 (MHz)
- Branding: KNDR 104.7

Programming
- Format: Commercial; Contemporary Christian music

Ownership
- Owner: Central Dakota Enterprises

History
- Call sign meaning: K-North Dakota Radio

Technical information
- Licensing authority: FCC
- Class: C1
- ERP: 100,000 watts
- HAAT: 260 meters

Links
- Public license information: Public file; LMS
- Website: www.kndr.fm

KNDR (104.7 FM) is a Christian radio station founded in 1977 in Mandan, North Dakota. Before KLBE-LP signed on, it was the only local source in Bismarck-Mandan for contemporary Christian music, along with Bible-based talk and teaching programming. Though licensed commercially, KNDR operates as a non-profit 501(c)(3) organization under the name Central Dakota Enterprises, Inc. The organization's founding year is listed as 1975, and it has maintained its tax-exempt status since October 1981.

As a non-profit, Central Dakota Enterprises relies heavily on listener and public support. In recent financial years, contributions and grants accounted for over 80% of its total revenue. While KNDR is licensed by the FCC as a commercial station, it uses commercial advertisements and business underwriting to supplement its primary funding from donations.

== Technical Details and Programming ==
The station broadcasts on the frequency 104.7 MHz with a high power of 100,000 watts ERP (Effective Radiated Power), which is licensed through the Federal Communications Commission (FCC) under Facility ID 9869.

KNDR operates 24 hours a day and adheres to a broadcast schedule that is approximately 75% Christian music and 25% Bible teaching and faith-based talk programs. Nationally syndicated programs carried by the station include: Insight for Living with Chuck Swindoll, Focus on the Family, Living on the Edge with Chip Ingram

In 2022, Central Dakota Enterprises expanded its ministry by purchasing a second station, KXRP (91.3 FM) in Bismarck, along with a translator in Williston, for $100,000. Following the acquisition, Central Dakota Enterprises rebranded KXRP as "Heartland 91.3" and launched a dedicated Christian Country format on the signal in August 2022.
