= Melissa Grunlan =

American scientist

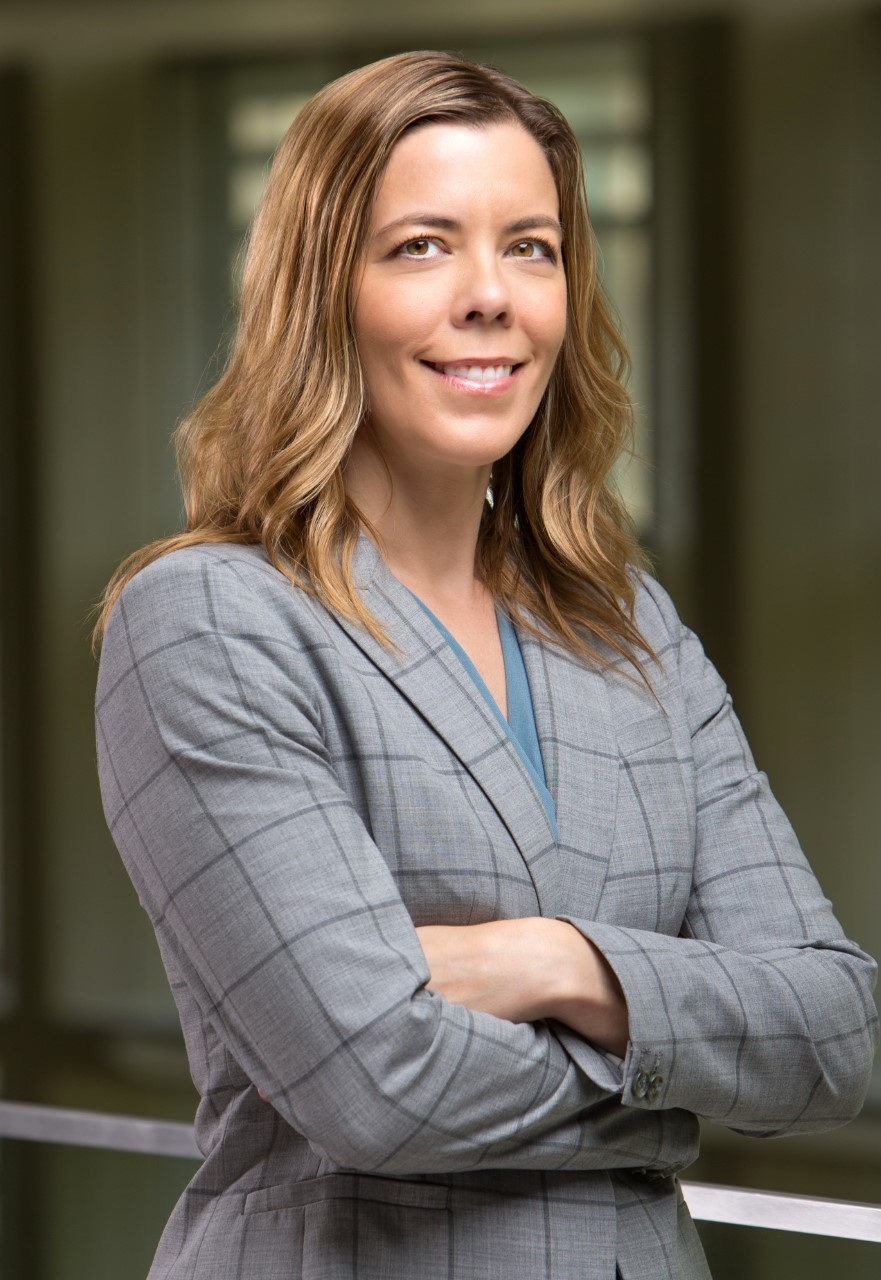
- Born: Bismarck, North Dakota, US

Academic background
- Education: BSc, Chemistry, MSc, Polymers and Coatings, 1997, North Dakota State University; PhD, Chemistry, 2004, University of Southern California
- Thesis: Crosslinked siloxanes: preparation and properties (2004)

Academic work
- Institutions: Texas A&M University
- Website: grunlanresearchgroup.org

Melissa A. Grunlan (née Deisz) is an American scientist and professor. She is the holder of the Charles H. and Bettye Barclay Professorship in the Department of Biomedical Engineering at Texas A&M University, a position she's held since 2018. She also holds courtesy appointments in the Departments of Chemistry and Materials Science and Engineering.

Her work spans several fields, including materials science, chemistry, and bioengineering, broadly focusing on the development of polymeric biomaterials for regenerative medicine and medical devices. Grunlan has published more than 120 journal articles, with particular emphasis on the areas of antifouling silicones, hydrogels, and shape memory polymers.

== Early life and education ==
Grunlan was born to parents Mike and Angie Deisz in Bismarck, North Dakota. As a student at St. Mary's Central High School, she was a member of the National Honor Society for three years. Grunlan graduated with honors from St. Mary's in 1991. While completing her Bachelor of Science degree in chemistry at North Dakota State University, Grunlan received a NASA research fellowship to assist her studies in synthetic organic research. Upon graduating with her BSc and master's degree, Grunlan was employed at the H.B. Fuller Company for four years and then enrolled at the University of Southern California for her PhD in chemistry. She received a Doctoral Dissertation Award from USC's College of Letters, Arts, and Sciences. Following her PhD, Grunlan was a postdoctoral fellow in the Department of Chemistry at Texas A&M University.

== Career ==
Following her PhD and post-doctoral fellowship, Grunlan joined the Department of Biomedical Engineering at Texas A&M as a tenure-track assistant professor in August 2005. As a professor in this department, she focused on tailoring polymer structures at the molecular level to improve their utility in medical devices. In recognition of her research, she was awarded a 2010–11 Herbert H. Richardson Faculty Fellow Award. She has worked on the development of "self-cleaning membranes" to enable the development of subcutaneous glucose biosensors. Grunlan was soon appointed the director of undergraduate programs in biomedical engineering. In 2014, Grunlan created a polymer foam to precisely fill a bone defect before hardening into a porous material to treat facial defects.

By 2017, Grunlan's laboratory focused on developing new polymeric biomaterials for medical devices and regenerative therapies. As an associate professor, she continued work on developing self-cleaning membranes for implanted biosensors, clot-resistant coatings for blood-contacting devices, and scaffolds for bone repair and for the regeneration of osteochondral interfaces. As such, she was named among the inaugural class of Texas A&M's Presidential Impact Fellows. The following year, Grunlan was recognized as a Fellow of the American Institute for Medical and Biological Engineering for "outstanding contributions for the development of polymeric biomaterials for medical devices and regenerative engineering scaffolds."

Outside of Texas A&M, Grunlan has been recognized for her work developing synthetic polymeric biomaterials for implanted medical devices and for regenerative engineering. In 2019, Grunlan was recognized as a Fellow of the American Chemical Society (ACS) for her research on regenerative medicine, specifically to develop tissue engineering scaffolds that can help heal orthopedic tissues. The following year, she was named the 2020 Chancellor Enhancing Development and Generating Excellence in Scholarship Fellow. After serving as 2018 Chair for ACS' Polymeric Materials: Science and Engineering Division, Grunlan was recognized with their 2021 Distinguished Service Award. In 2022, she was named a Senior Member of the National Academy of Inventors and became a Fellow of the ACS' Polymeric Materials: Science and Engineering Division.

== Certifications and Memberships ==
- Associate editor for ACS Macro Letters
- Fellow, American Institute for Medical and Biological Engineering (AIMBE) (inducted 2018)
- Fellow, American Chemical Society (ACS) (inducted 2019)
- Senior Member, National Academy of Inventors (NAI) (inducted 2022)
- Fellow, Biomedical Engineering Society (BMES) (inducted 2022)
- Fellow, ACS Division of Polymeric Materials Science & Engineering (PMSE) (inducted 2022)

== Awards and honors ==
- Doctoral Research Award (University of Southern California, College of Letters, Arts & Sciences; 2005)
- Herbert H. Richardson Faculty Fellow Award, 2010
- British Petroleum Teaching Excellence Award, 2012
