= KKBO =

Coordinates: 46.590°N 100.795°W

Flasher, North Dakota; United States
- Broadcast area: Bismarck-Mandan
- Frequency: 105.9 MHz
- Branding: '"105.9 The Big Rig"

Programming
- Format: Country

Ownership
- Owner: Larry Schmidt; (Radio Bismarck Mandan, LLC)
- Sister stations: KXRV

History
- First air date: December 19, 2008
- Call sign meaning: KK BOb (former branding)

Technical information
- Licensing authority: FCC
- Facility ID: 166041
- Class: C1
- ERP: 100,000 watts
- HAAT: 278 meters

Links
- Public license information: Public file; LMS
- Website: http://www.bigrig1059.com

KKBO (105.9 FM, "The Big Rig") is a country music radio station in Bismarck, North Dakota (licensed to Flasher). It serves the Bismarck-Mandan metropolitan area. The station broadcasts from a storefront studio on North 4th Street in Bismarck (along with sister station KXRV) competing against iHeartMedia's KQDY/94.5, KBMR/1130, and Townsquare Media's KUSB "US 103.3".

== History ==
KKBO first signed on the air on December 19, 2008.

The station was launched by Connoisseur Media, LLC, and operated with an Adult Hits format, branded as "105.9 Bob-FM." In September 2012, Connoisseur Media announced the sale of the station to Radio Bismarck-Mandan, LLC, owned by Larry J. Schmidt. The purchase price for the station was $700,000, and the sale was officially consummated on October 1, 2012. This acquisition placed KKBO in a cluster with the existing Radio Bismarck-Mandan station, KXRV (107.5 FM).

Following the change in ownership, the station immediately flipped its format. On December 9, 2012, KKBO switched from Adult Hits to a Country music format, rebranding as "105.9 The Big Rig – New Country and The Legends."

KKBO, branded as "Big Rig 105.9," currently focuses on playing the legends of country music alongside hot, new artists of today. The station broadcasts from a shared storefront studio at 409 N. 4th Street in Bismarck and features local personalities, including the legendary Bismarck-Mandan voice, Sid Hardt.
