= Sam McQuade Sr. softball tournament =

The Sam McQuade Sr. softball tournament is an annual charity softball event held in the Bismarck–Mandan area of North Dakota. Officially the "Sam McQuade Sr./Budweiser Charity Softball Tournament", this event draws approximately 400 teams from the United States and Canada areas, as well as roughly 15,000 fans that attend the event. The event is hosted at several softball complexes around the Bismarck-Mandan area every June, and claims to be the largest charity softball event in the world.

== History ==
The Sam McQuade Sr. softball tournament is a non-profit, one-weekend slow-pitch softball tournament founded in 1976 by Sam McQuade Sr. of McQuade Distributing Co., Inc., the local distributor of Budweiser beer of the Bismarck–Mandan Area. The father of a special needs son, McQuade was aware of the financial challenges of local charities and organizations. The first year of the tournament raised over $1,000 and brought 103 teams in 4 divisions to Bismarck, ND. The event grew to over 400 teams in 13 divisions and raised over $30,000 in total donations in 1992, the year McQuade died. In 2009, the tournament raised over $75,000. Today, the tournament is run by a Board of Directors, which includes Sam McQuade Jr., his daughter Shannon McQuade-Ely and several other community leaders.

== Teams ==
Teams have come from neighboring states, such as Minnesota, South Dakota, and Montana; and as far away as Arizona, Arkansas, California, Colorado, Idaho, Michigan, Missouri, Nevada, Washington state and Wyoming. Teams also come from 2 Canadian provinces. In addition, the tournament also helped sponsor international divisions in 2006 in Bosnia, three in Baghdad (2007, 2008 & 2009), and one in Kosovo in 2010. The tournament also showcases the North Dakota Military All Stars team, which includes active and retired military members. All of the proceeds benefit local charities and organizations, especially those that help run the tournament.

== Champions ==
=== 2015 tournament champions ===
Division	Team	City
Men's A / Supers	Long Haul / Hortenbach Auto / Easton	Cicero, New York
Men's C	Corral / Grind Athletics / Bud Lt / Heart River	Bismarck, North Dakota
Men's D	Quality Alignment / NuBar	Valley City, North Dakota
Men's Rec 1	Berger Chiropractic	Mandan, North Dakota
Men's Rec 2	Center Merchants	Center, North Dakota
Men's Rec 3 (Budweiser)	Warning Track Power	Bismarck, North Dakota
Men's Rec 3 (Bud Light)	Wings & Rings / Shuler Repair	Minot, North Dakota
Men's Rec 4	Lovable Losers	Gilbert, Arizona
Masters 35-49 (Michelob Ultra)	All Airforce Alumni	Converse, Texas
Masters 35-49 (Michelob Amber Bock)	Wild Bills / Bootlegrz	Minot, North Dakota
Masters 50	Bellerud Transport	Fargo, North Dakota
Women's C/D	Amundson Farms / Tharaldson	Fargo, North Dakota
Women's Rec 1	Capri Bar	Minot, North Dakota
Women's Rec 2	Buffalo Wild Wings / Slater Const. / Bud Light	Williston, North Dakota
Women's Rec 3	Prairie Wind / Dinkerson Animal Hospital	Minot, North Dakota
