= KUSB =

Radio station in Hazelton–Bismarck, North Dakota

Coordinates: 46.5900°N 100.7965°W

Hazelton, North Dakota; United States
- Broadcast area: Bismarck-Mandan
- Frequency: 103.3 MHz
- Branding: US 103.3

Programming
- Format: Country
- Affiliations: Compass Media Networks; Westwood One

Ownership
- Owner: Townsquare Media; (Townsquare License, LLC)
- Sister stations: KACL, KBYZ, KKCT, KLXX

History
- First air date: 2006
- Call sign meaning: K US 103.3 Bismarck

Technical information
- Licensing authority: FCC
- Facility ID: 162267
- Class: C1
- ERP: 100,000 watts
- HAAT: 294 meters

Links
- Public license information: Public file; LMS
- Webcast: Listen Live
- Website: us1033.com

KUSB (103.3 FM), known as "US 103.3", is a radio station located in Bismarck, North Dakota, owned by Townsquare Media that signed on September 25, 2006 with a country music format, directly competing with Clear Channel Communications' KQDY 94.5 and Radio Bismarck-Mandan's KKBO "105.9 The Big Rig".

Townsquare Media also owns KLXX 1270 (talk), KACL 98.7 (oldies) KBYZ 96.5 (classic rock), and KKCT 97.5 (Top 40 (CHR)) in the Bismarck-Mandan area. All the studios are at 4303 Memorial Highway in Mandan, along with the AM transmitter and tower. All the FM transmitters are at a site in Saint Anthony, North Dakota, on 57th Road. The station's studios are co-located with its sister stations at 4303 Memorial Highway in Mandan.

== History ==
The station signed on the air on September 25, 2006, with a Country music format, immediately branded as "US 103.3."

The sign-on was specifically intended to compete directly with other Country stations in the Bismarck market, particularly iHeartMedia's KQDY 94.5 and later, Radio Bismarck-Mandan's KKBO 105.9 "The Big Rig."
