= KLXX =

Coordinates: 46°48′37″N 100°50′10″W

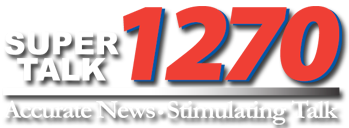

Bismarck-Mandan, North Dakota; United States
- Broadcast area: Bismarck-Mandan
- Frequency: 1270 kHz
- Branding: Super Talk 1270

Programming
- Format: News/talk
- Affiliations: ABC News Radio; Genesis Communications Network; Premiere Networks; Radio America; Salem Radio Network; USA Radio Network; Westwood One; Bismarck Bobcats; Bismarck Larks; Minnesota Timberwolves

Ownership
- Owner: Townsquare Media; (Townsquare License, LLC)
- Sister stations: KACL, KBYZ, KKCT, KUSB

History
- First air date: 1926 (as KGCU)
- Former call signs: KGCU (1926–1956), KBOM (1956–1982), KWWB (briefly after March 1974)

Technical information
- Licensing authority: FCC
- Facility ID: 43223
- Class: B
- Power: 1,000 watts day 250 watts night

Links
- Public license information: Public file; LMS
- Webcast: Listen Live
- Website: supertalk1270.com

KLXX (1270 AM), known as "Super Talk 1270", is a radio station located midway between Mandan and Bismarck, North Dakota, United States. It has always been licensed to Mandan, although most of its audience is in neighboring Bismarck. KLXX currently broadcasts with a news/talk format.

Townsquare Media also owns KACL 98.7 (Oldies), KBYZ 96.5 (Classic rock), KKCT 97.5 (Top 40), and KUSB 103.3 (Country) in the Bismarck-Mandan area. All the studios are at 4303 Memorial Highway in Mandan. The AM transmitter and tower are also at this location.

== History ==
The station was founded in the fall of 1926 as KGCU by the Mandan Chamber of Commerce, and initially broadcast at 1250 on the dial. The call letters were randomly assigned from an alphabetical list of available call signs, although the "GCU" portion of the original call letters matched the initials of George C. Underwood, a member of the founding group. Later that year ownership was transferred to the Mandan Radio Association (A. W. Nordholm). After re-branding to KBOM ("K-Bomb") on April 1, 1956, the station went through several formats and owners.

In December 1962 KBOM's license was revoked by the Federal Communications Commission (FCC), effective the following February 17, after finding that "officers and directors of KBOM knowingly and willfully misrepresented the station's ownership". The station was relicensed the next year to Capital Broadcasting, Inc., which revived the KBOM call letters. For a short time in 1974 the call sign was KWWB, before returning to KBOM. The call letters were changed to KLXX on September 29, 1982.

=== Expanded Band assignment ===
On March 17, 1997 the FCC announced that eighty-eight stations had been given permission to move to newly available "Expanded Band" transmitting frequencies, ranging from 1610 to 1700 kHz, with KLXX authorized to move from 1270 to 1640 kHz. However, the station never procured the Construction Permit needed to implement the authorization, so the expanded band station was never built.
