= KXRV =

Coordinates: 46.572°N 100.795°W

Cannon Ball, North Dakota; United States
- Broadcast area: Bismarck-Mandan
- Frequency: 107.5 MHz
- Branding: Mojo 107.5

Programming
- Format: Classic hits

Ownership
- Owner: Larry Schmidt; (Radio Bismarck Mandan, LLC)
- Sister stations: KKBO

History
- First air date: June 2009
- Call sign meaning: K X RiVer (previous format)

Technical information
- Licensing authority: FCC
- Facility ID: 165952
- Class: C1
- ERP: 100,000 watts
- HAAT: 237 meters (778 ft)

Links
- Public license information: Public file; LMS
- Webcast: Listen Live
- Website: mojo1075.com

KXRV (107.5 FM) is a radio station in Bismarck, North Dakota (licensed to Cannon Ball), serving the Bismarck-Mandan area with a classic hits music format branded as "MOJO 107.5" that competes against Townsquare Media's KACL "Cool 98.7". The station broadcasts from a storefront studio on North 4th Street in Bismarck (along with sister station KKBO), with a lineup including several longtime Bismarck radio personalities. The station broadcasts from a storefront studio on 409 N. 4th Street in Bismarck (along with sister station KKBO), with a lineup including several longtime Bismarck radio personalities.

== History ==
Radio Assist Ministry (doing business as World Radio Link) intended on signing on a religious formatted station at 107.5 FM. Instead, in June 2009, KXRV signed on with an adult contemporary format as "107.5 The River."

In October 2010, it was announced that Radio Assist Ministry was selling the station to Radio Bismarck Mandan, LLC (headed by Larry Schmidt). Radio Bismarck-Mandan previously owned radio stations in the Bismarck market before selling them to Clear Channel in 2004.

On November 1, 2011, KXRV switched to a classic hits format, following the sale to Radio Bismarck-Mandan, and was rebranded as "MOJO 107.5."
