= KXMR =

Radio station located in Bismarck, North Dakota

- Bismarck, North Dakota; United States
- Broadcast area: Bismarck-Mandan
- Frequency: 710 kHz
- Branding: Fox Sports 710

Programming
- Format: Sports/classic rock
- Affiliations: Fox Sports Radio; KFAN Radio Network; Minnesota Twins

Ownership
- Owner: iHeartMedia, Inc.; (iHM Licenses, LLC)
- Sister stations: KBMR, KFYR, KQDY, KSSS, KYYY

History
- First air date: January 2002; 24 years ago

Technical information
- Licensing authority: FCC
- Facility ID: 2211
- Class: B
- Power: 4,000 watts
- Transmitter coordinates: 46°40′08″N 100°46′33″W

Links
- Public license information: Public file; LMS
- Webcast: Listen Live
- Website: foxsports710.iheart.com

KXMR (710 AM) is a radio station located in Bismarck, North Dakota, airing Fox Sports Radio, and is owned by iHeartMedia, Inc. Fox Sports 710 broadcasts Minnesota Twins games. Fox Sports 710 also airs classic rock music at certain times.

The station aired programming from KFAN of Minneapolis, Minnesota, until April 16, 2007, when it became a full-time ESPN Radio affiliate.

On June 1, 2014, at midnight, KXMR rebranded as "710 The Fan" and switched affiliations from ESPN Radio to Fox Sports Radio; the station also airs "Fan" programming from KFXN-FM in Minneapolis. The station rebranded as "Fox Sports 710" in 2015 without any changes to its "Fan" programming.

iHeartMedia, Inc. also owns KFYR 550 (News/Talk), KBMR 1130 (Classic country), KYYY 92.9 (Top 40 (CHR)), KQDY 94.5 (Country), and KSSS 101.5 (Mainstream rock) in the Bismarck-Mandan area.

On April 27, 2017, KXMR filed an application for a Federal Communications Commission construction permit to move the day transmitter site to the night site and decrease day power to 4,000 watts. Critical hours operation would be discontinued. The application was accepted for filing the following day.
