= KQDY =

Coordinates: 46.942°N 100.694°W

Bismarck, North Dakota; United States
- Broadcast area: Bismarck-Mandan
- Frequency: 94.5 MHz
- Branding: KQ 94.5

Programming
- Format: Country
- Affiliations: Premiere Networks

Ownership
- Owner: iHeartMedia, Inc.; (iHM Licenses, LLC)
- Sister stations: KBMR, KFYR, KSSS, KXMR, KYYY

History
- First air date: September 13, 1968; 57 years ago (as KBMR-FM)
- Former call signs: KBMR-FM (1968–1975)

Technical information
- Licensing authority: FCC
- Facility ID: 2204
- Class: C
- ERP: 100,000 watts
- HAAT: 341 meters (1,119 ft)

Links
- Public license information: Public file; LMS
- Webcast: Listen Live
- Website: kqdy.iheart.com

KQDY (94.5 FM), known as "KQ 94.5", is a radio station located in Bismarck, North Dakota, United States, owned by iHeartMedia, Inc. The station airs a country music format competing with Townsquare Media's KUSB "US 103.3" and Radio Bismarck-Mandan's KKBO "105.9 The Big Rig".

iHeartMedia, Inc. also owns KFYR 550 (News/Talk), KXMR 710 (Sports), KBMR 1130 (Classic country), KYYY 92.9 (CHR/Top 40), and KSSS 101.5 (Mainstream Rock) in the Bismarck-Mandan area.

== History ==
KQDY first signed on the air on September 13, 1968, originally operating under the call sign KBMR-FM. The station was the first stereo radio station in the Bismarck area. The call sign was changed to KQDY in 1975.

The station's ownership was part of a cluster operated by Anderson Broadcasting before being sold. A proposed sale to Cumulus Media in 1999 ultimately failed due to regulatory concerns. KQDY was eventually acquired by Clear Channel Communications (now iHeartMedia, Inc.) in 2004.
