= KYYY =

- Bismarck, North Dakota; United States
- Broadcast area: Bismarck–Mandan
- Frequency: 92.9 MHz
- Branding: Mix 92.9

Programming
- Format: Adult contemporary

Ownership
- Owner: iHeartMedia, Inc.; (iHM Licenses, LLC)
- Sister stations: KBMR; KFYR; KQDY; KSSS; KXMR

History
- First air date: August 15, 1966
- Former call signs: KFYR-FM (1966–1978)
- Call sign meaning: Supporting "Y93" moniker, derived from former KFYR call letters

Technical information
- Licensing authority: FCC
- Facility ID: 41424
- Class: C0
- ERP: 100,000 watts
- HAAT: 301 meters (988 ft)
- Transmitter coordinates: 46°56′31″N 100°41′38″W

Links
- Public license information: Public file; LMS
- Webcast: Listen live (via iHeartRadio)
- Website: bismarcksmix.iheart.com

KYYY (92.9 FM) is a commercial radio station licensed to Bismarck, North Dakota, and serving the Bismarck–Mandan region.

Owned by iHeartMedia, the station has an adult contemporary format under the "Mix 92.9" banner. For 45 years, the station was known as "Y93" in various blends of contemporary hit radio (CHR) and adult contemporary. During some of this period, it was Bismarck's highest-rated radio station.

The KYYY studios are located on Rosser Avenue in Bismarck, while the transmitter resides north of the city in Burleigh County. In addition to a standard analog transmission, KYYY streams online via iHeartRadio.

== History ==
On November 24, 1965, Meyer Broadcasting, owner of KFYR radio and television, received a construction permit for a new FM station on 92.9 MHz in Bismarck. The station launched August 15, 1966, as the first FM in the central North Dakota area, airing a fine music format and calling itself "Royalty in Music". In 1973, the station was moved to the KFYR-TV mast at Mandan and adopted the Hit Parade format from Drake-Chenault. The "Y93" name was instituted in late 1975, and the call letters were changed to KYYY on February 2, 1978. The station's Top 40 format was similar to that on KFYR, which had more service elements such as news and programs. In 1985, KYYY surpassed KFYR in the ratings; that year, the two Meyer stations accounted for just under half of all radio listening in Bismarck, and the stations were number one and two in the market from 1984 to 1992, with KQDY and a resurgent country format breaking the grip.

KYYY tweaked to a satellite-delivered hot AC format in January 1996, and dumped morning man Bob Beck, who had been heard on the station for 14 years. Ratings dropped nearly 50 percent.

After a long and successful run in North Dakota broadcasting—dating back 73 years to the launch of KFYR—Meyer exited the business in 1998. Sunrise Television acquired KFYR-TV, while Meyer initially negotiated with Cumulus Media to purchase the radio properties. However, those talks collapsed, and Jacor ultimately agreed to purchase KFYR and KYYY for $4.8 million in September 1998. Clear Channel Communications—today's iHeartMedia—then entered into an agreement to buy Jacor less than a month later. The Bismarck stations were to have been included in the proposed $452.1 million sale of small market properties to GoodRadio.tv LLC in 2007, which ultimately never occurred.

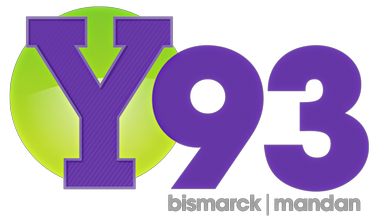
Last logo as "Y93"

After KKCT (97.5 FM) flipped from country to CHR as "Hot 97.5", KYYY tweaked to a full-fledged CHR format in 2004. This lasted until 2005, when it changed to an adult contemporary format playing Christmas music during the holiday season annually. After playing Christmas music for the 2011 holiday season, KYYY tweaked its format again towards a hot AC format due to a growing abundance of Bismarck stations sharing the 1970s and 1980s music that KYYY played. On September 14, 2012, KYYY shifted back to CHR; it also replaced the John Tesh morning show (a holdover from the adult contemporary era) with Elvis Duran and the Morning Show, broadcast from Z100 in New York City. On November 5, 2021, iHeart flipped more than 80 stations to Christmas music for the season, including KYYY—which, unlike in past years, dropped its "Y93" branding after more than 45 years to go by "Christmas 92.9". At the time, KYYY was pulling half the rating of KKCT in the Bismarck market. On December 27, KYYY adopted the "Mix 92.9" moniker and a mainstream adult contemporary format, with the first song being "Apologize" by Timbaland featuring OneRepublic.
