= Sertoma Park (Bismarck, North Dakota) =

Park in Bismarck, North Dakota

Coordinates: 46°48′03″N 100°48′30″W

Sertoma Park is a park in Bismarck, North Dakota. Sertoma is on a three-mile stretch of riverside plain on the Missouri River. The Lewis and Clark Riverboat docks at the park when it is not giving tours of the river where Lewis and Clark once were over 200 years ago. Sertoma has over four miles of recreational paved trails along the river, which are part of the expansive citywide trail system. Inside Sertoma Park is the Dakota Zoo, which is home to 125 different species and receives over 100,000 visitors per year.
