= KACL (FM) =

Bismarck, North Dakota; United States
- Broadcast area: Bismarck-Mandan
- Frequency: 98.7 MHz
- Branding: Cool 98.7

Programming
- Format: Classic hits
- Affiliations: Compass Media Networks; Premiere Networks

Ownership
- Owner: Townsquare Media; (Townsquare License, LLC)
- Sister stations: KBYZ, KKCT, KLXX, KUSB

History
- First air date: 1997
- Call sign meaning: K A CooL

Technical information
- Facility ID: 15967
- Class: C1
- ERP: 100,000 watts
- HAAT: 255.2 meters
- Transmitter coordinates: 46°35′24″N 100°47′46″W

Links
- Webcast: Listen Live
- Website: cool987fm.com

KACL (98.7 MHz, "Cool 98.7") is an FM radio station in Bismarck, North Dakota, owned by Townsquare Media airing a classic hits format competing against Radio Bismarck-Mandan's KXRV "Mojo 107.5". The station signed on in 1997 and has never changed its format, although it shifted from 1960s and 1970s music based oldies to 1970s and 1980s based classic hits in 2009. The studios and offices for the cluster are co-located at 4303 Memorial Highway in Mandan, North Dakota.

== History ==
The station first signed on the air in 1997.

KACL was confirmed to be running an Oldies format, branded as "Cool 98.7," as early as 2003. In 2009, the station transitioned its playlist to a broader Classic Hits format, shifting its focus from 1960s/70s oldies to music primarily from the 1970s and 1980s.

The station's ownership changed as part of a major asset exchange in 2012. Townsquare Media acquired the Bismarck cluster, including KACL, from Cumulus Media Inc. in a transaction announced in April 2012.

Townsquare Media also owns KLXX 1270 (Talk), KBYZ 96.5 (Classic rock), KKCT 97.5 (Top 40), and KUSB 103.3 (Country) in the Bismarck-Mandan area. All the studios are at 4303 Memorial Highway in Mandan, along with the AM transmitter and tower. All the FM transmitters are at a site in Saint Anthony, North Dakota, on 57th Road.
