= KKCT =

Coordinates: 46.590°N 100.797°W

- Bismarck, North Dakota; United States
- Broadcast area: Bismarck-Mandan
- Frequency: 97.5MHz (HD Radio)
- Branding: Hot 97-5

Programming
- Format: Contemporary hit radio
- Affiliations: Compass Media Networks, Premiere Networks

Ownership
- Owner: Townsquare Media; (Townsquare License, LLC)
- Sister stations: KACL, KBYZ, KLXX, KUSB

History
- First air date: 1993
- Call sign meaning: Cat Country (original format)

Technical information
- Licensing authority: FCC
- Facility ID: 31176
- Class: C1
- ERP: 100,000watts
- HAAT: 937 Feet

Links
- Public license information: Public file; LMS
- Webcast: Listen Live
- Website: hot975fm.com

KKCT (97.5 FM), known as Hot 97.5, is a top 40 (CHR) radio station licensed to Bismarck, North Dakota. As of April 1, 2026, KKCT has installed tower equipment for broadcast on an HD Radio band.

Townsquare Media also owns KLXX 1270 (Talk), KBYZ 96.5 (Classic rock), KACL 98.7 (Oldies), and KUSB 103.3 (Country) in the Bismarck-Mandan area. All the studios are at 4303 Memorial Highway in Mandan, along with the AM transmitter and tower. All the FM transmitters are at a site in Saint Anthony, North Dakota, on 57th Road.

== History ==
KKCT first signed on the air in 1993 with a Country music format branded as "Kat Kountry."

Logo under previous slogan

The station flipped to its current Contemporary Hit Radio (CHR) format, rebranding as "Hot 97.5," in 2004. This format change led to format shifts at competitor stations in the Bismarck market, notably KYYY (92.9 FM), which subsequently switched to an adult contemporary format.

KKCT's ownership changed as part of a major transaction in 2012. Townsquare Media acquired the Bismarck cluster, including KKCT, from Cumulus Media Inc. The deal involved the acquisition of 55 stations in 11 markets and was announced in April 2012.
