= KBYZ =

Radio station in Bismarck, North Dakota

Coordinates: 46.590°N 100.797°W

- Bismarck, North Dakota; United States
- Broadcast area: Bismarck-Mandan
- Frequency: 96.5 MHz
- Branding: 96.5 The Walleye

Programming
- Format: Classic rock
- Affiliations: Compass Media Networks

Ownership
- Owner: Townsquare Media; (Townsquare License, LLC)
- Sister stations: KACL, KKCT, KLXX, KUSB

History
- First air date: 1984
- Former call signs: KYSX (1983–1984)
- Call sign meaning: B YZ (substitute for "is") marck

Technical information
- Licensing authority: FCC
- Facility ID: 43221
- Class: C1
- ERP: 100,000 watts
- HAAT: 293.6 meters

Links
- Public license information: Public file; LMS
- Webcast: Listen Live
- Website: 965thewalleye.com

KBYZ (96.5 FM), known as "96.5 The Walleye", is a radio station located in Bismarck, North Dakota, United States, owned by Townsquare Media.

Townsquare Media also owns KLXX 1270 (Talk), KKCT 97.5 (CHR), KACL 98.7 (Classic Hits), and KUSB 103.3 (Country) in the Bismarck-Mandan area. All the studios are at 4303 Memorial Highway in Mandan, along with the AM transmitter and tower. All the FM transmitters are at a site in Saint Anthony, North Dakota, on 57th Road.

== History ==
The station first signed on the air in 1984 with an Adult Contemporary format, using the branding "Z-96." The original call sign for the frequency was KYSX from 1983 to 1984.

The format transitioned to Classic Rock in the early 1990s, where it remained for nearly two decades, using the branding "The Fox." Following an ownership change, the station began evolving its playlist in the mid-2000s to include newer rock content, creating a Mainstream Rock approach. On December 11, 2021, the station dropped the "Fox" branding and began a five-day format stunt before rebranding as "96.5 The Walleye" on December 16, 2021.

The station's current ownership began in 2012 when Townsquare Media acquired the Bismarck cluster, including KBYZ, from Cumulus Media Inc. The acquisition involved 55 stations in 11 markets.

In 2013, the station rebranded itself as "The New Evolution of Classic rock" and began playing more 80's and 90's-based rock. The station also dropped The Bob and Tom Show, opting for Grand Rapids-based Free Beer and Hot Wings, to anchor the station's morning show.
