= KFYR (AM) =

- Bismarck, North Dakota; United States
- Broadcast area: Bismarck-Mandan
- Frequency: 550 kHz
- Branding: KFYR 550 AM

Programming
- Format: News-Talk
- Network: Fox News Radio
- Affiliations: Premiere Networks; Westwood One; Minnesota Vikings; University of Mary

Ownership
- Owner: iHeartMedia, Inc.; (iHM Licenses, LLC)
- Sister stations: KBMR, KQDY, KSSS, KXMR, KYYY

History
- First air date: 1925; 101 years ago
- Call sign meaning: F(P)hillip Meyer (founder of station)

Technical information
- Licensing authority: FCC
- Facility ID: 41426
- Class: B
- Power: 5,000 watts
- Transmitter coordinates: 46°51′12″N 100°32′38.4″W
- Translator: 99.7 K259AF (Bismarck)

Links
- Public license information: Public file; LMS
- Webcast: Listen Live
- Website: kfyr.iheart.com

KFYR (550 kHz) is a commercial AM radio station in Bismarck, North Dakota. It airs a news-talk radio format and is owned by iHeartMedia, Inc. Some hours on weekends, the station plays oldies. The studios are on East Rosser Avenue in Bismarck.

KFYR is powered at 5,000 watts with a signal that can be heard in four U.S. states and two Canadian provinces. By day, it is non-directional. But at night, the station uses a directional antenna with a two-tower array. The transmitter is off 158th Street NE in Menoken. Programming is also heard on 250-watt FM translator K259AF at 99.7 MHz in Bismarck.

== Signal ==
KFYR's 5,000-watt, non-directional daytime signal gives it an enormous daytime coverage area, equivalent to that of a full-power FM station. This is due to its location near the bottom of the AM dial; lower frequencies have longer wavelengths that tend to travel farther across terrain. This is especially true for stations that operate at 5,000 watts or more. Additionally, North Dakota's flat landscape provides near-perfect ground conductivity, rated at a relatively high 30 millisiemens per meter, which minimizes signal loss.

It can be heard across almost all of North Dakota during the day, as well as in parts of Minnesota, South Dakota, Montana, Manitoba, and Saskatchewan. Under the right conditions, it reaches into Nebraska.

It has been claimed that KFYR has the largest daytime land coverage area of any AM radio station in the United States. A similar claim can be made for WNAX in Yankton, South Dakota, which transmits on 570 AM and also benefits from the prairie state's high ground conductivity.

At night, two towers are used in a directional pattern to protect CBK, the CBC Radio One outlet for most of Saskatchewan, which operates on the adjacent frequency of 540 AM. Even with this restriction, KFYR still covers almost all of North Dakota at night. It is designated as the Primary Entry Point (PEP) station for the Emergency Alert System (EAS) in the Bismarck operational area, serving as a critical dissemination point for emergency alerts.

== History ==
=== Early years ===
KFYR signed on the air in 1925. It was founded by Phillip J. Meyer and his wife, Etta Hoskins Meyer, making it Bismarck's oldest radio station. KFYR began operations with programming for only a few hours daily, signing off between shows.

In its early years, KFYR was a long-time affiliate of the NBC Red Network, airing its dramas, comedies, news, and sports during the "Golden Age of Radio". Early programming included live studio musicians, transcribed music and programs, and live feeds from NBC. Many popular soap operas, game shows, sporting events, religious services, children's programs, and big band broadcasts were part of the regular schedule. The station carried NBC's long-running weekend magazine show, "Monitor," which offered a mix of news, comedy, and music.

Other programming included local news, weather, and sports, locally originated variety programs such as "What's The Weather" weekday mornings and "The Northwest Farmfront" weekdays at noon. Mike Dosch, an established musician from Strasburg, North Dakota (Lawrence Welk's hometown), was featured on several of the live shows and had his own late-night program of organ music for many years. The station also featured staff announcers who played recorded popular music by such artists as Nat King Cole, Doris Day, The Ames Brothers, Fred Waring and the Pennsylvanians, and orchestras including Mantovani, Percy Faith, and Frank Chacksfield.

By 1950, the station had expanded its schedule to an 18-hour broadcast day, operating from 6 a.m. and concluding at midnight.

=== TV and FM stations ===
In December 1953, Meyer Broadcasting added television station KFYR-TV on Channel 5. Because KFYR radio was an established NBC affiliate, KFYR-TV became western North Dakota's NBC television affiliate, along with its three semi-satellites: KMOT (Minot), KUMV-TV (Williston), and KQCD-TV (Dickinson). The television network was established by the Meyer family, who owned and operated the cluster for decades.

In 1966, an FM station went on the air, KFYR-FM at 92.9 MHz. The station's call sign was later changed to KYYY. At one time, the Meyer Broadcasting Company roster also included AM radio stations in Billings and Great Falls, Montana, as well as an FM station in Minot, North Dakota.

Marietta Meyer Ekberg, the daughter of founders Phillip and Etta Meyer, retired in 1998. Her radio holdings, which included KFYR and KYYY, were sold to Jacor Communications for $4.8 million in September 1998. Jacor, in turn, was acquired by Clear Channel Communications in October 1998, a forerunner to today's iHeartMedia.

=== Top 40 era ===
Facing stiff competition from more youthful stations, KFYR began to see its dominance and audience decline in the early 1960s. It decided to switch to a Top 40 format. It was popular with teenagers by virtue of its "Torrid Twenty" countdown show, which featured the twenty popular hits of the week. In the 1960s and 1970s, teenagers from South Dakota to parts of Canada enjoyed listening to "their" music on KFYR every evening (along with 1520 KOMA from Oklahoma City, 1090 KAAY from Little Rock, 890 WLS from Chicago, and 1500 KSTP from St. Paul).

KFYR gained brief national notoriety in 1979, when the station was sued in federal court by the Pointer Sisters and Elektra Records. The station had created a remix of the Pointer Sisters' cover of Bruce Springsteen's "Fire" with "K-Fire" dubbed into the chorus where "fire" would be sung. The suit was settled out of court.

KFYR once broadcast in AM stereo, beginning with the Harris system in the mid-1980s, and later switching to the Motorola C-QUAM system. KFYR discontinued broadcasting in AM stereo around the turn of the millennium.

=== Switch to talk ===
As younger listeners increasingly tuned to FM for their hits, KFYR switched its music to adult contemporary and oldies. By the 1990s, the station added more talk shows until it had fully switched to a news-talk format. In 2011, KFYR added an FM translator for listeners who prefer to hear the station on the FM dial. The translator on 99.7 FM (K259CJ) was previously a simulcast of sister station KQDY 94.5 FM before the change in 2011.

Today, KFYR runs a news/talk format, with some classics on weekends.. Local talk shows are heard in mornings and during afternoon drive time. The rest of the weekday schedule is made up of nationally syndicated conservative talk programs, including The Clay Travis and Buck Sexton Show, The Jesse Kelly Show, Our American Stories with Lee Habeeb, Coast to Coast AM with George Noory, and America in the Morning. KFYR is an affiliate of the Fox News Radio Network.

Weekend syndicated shows include Armstrong & Getty and Sunday Nights with Bill Cunningham. There is live play-by-play sports from the Minnesota Vikings football games, and high school sporting events. Some hours on weekends include oldies shows.

== Translator ==
KFYR also broadcasts on an FM translator:

Call sign	Frequency	City of license	FID	ERP (W)	Class	FCC info
K259AF	99.7 FM	Bismarck, North Dakota	2203	250	D	LMS
