= KBMR =

Radio station in Bismarck, North Dakota

Bismarck, North Dakota; United States
- Broadcast area: Bismarck-Mandan
- Frequency: 1130 kHz
- Branding: Country 1130AM & 104.1FM

Programming
- Format: Classic country
- Affiliations: NBC News Radio

Ownership
- Owner: iHeartMedia, Inc.; (iHM Licenses, LLC)
- Sister stations: KFYR, KQDY, KSSS, KXMR, KYYY

History
- First air date: August 15, 1958
- Former call signs: KQDI (1958–1963)
- Former frequencies: 1350 kHz (1958–1971)
- Call sign meaning: Bismarck-Mandan Radio

Technical information
- Licensing authority: FCC
- Facility ID: 2207
- Class: D
- Power: 10,000 watts day 24 watts night
- Transmitter coordinates: 46°48′37″N 100°44′11″W
- Translator: 104.1 K281DC (Bismarck)

Links
- Public license information: Public file; LMS
- Webcast: Listen Live
- Website: kbmr.iheart.com

KBMR (1130 AM), known as "Country 1130", is a radio station located in Bismarck, North Dakota, owned by iHeartMedia, Inc. The station runs a classic country format. It is one of six iHeartMedia-owned stations in the Bismarck-Mandan area.

== History ==
On June 6, 1957, Dakota Broadcasters—a consortium of Walter Nelskog, Paul Crain, Delbert Bertholf and D. Gene Williams—obtained a construction permit for a new radio station to serve Bismarck on 1350 kHz, with 500 watts during the day. The construction permit was originally known as KBMK before changing to KQDI before sign-on. From a tower near the Corral Drive-In in Bismarck and studios above a drug store on Fifth Street, KQDI signed on August 15, 1958. It was co-owned with stations in Minot and Billings and Great Falls, Montana; like them, it was a music-heavy station without network programming, playing Top 40 tunes. One of the station's first disc jockeys was Mandan native Tony Dean, who later hosted a regional outdoors program on television and radio.

After several changes in ownership, Weldon T. and Betty S. Heard bought KQDI in 1962. The purchase heralded a series of changes. On April 15, 1963, KQDI became KBMR, for "Bismarck-Mandan Radio", and shifted toward a "good music" format.

Another change in business operations kickstarted a regulatory case of interest to electric utilities in the state. The Heards switched electricity suppliers from Montana-Dakota Utilities to the Capital Electric Cooperative, a rural electric cooperative. MDU objected to the ability of Capital to serve the customer, who was not part of the cooperative, and started a series of legal battles over the regulation of such rural associations in the state. Disputes of this kind resulted in a state law intending to restrict the territory of utilities and electric cooperatives in 1965.

Alvin "Andy" Anderson was appointed general manager in late 1963, and later purchased the station in 1965. The format was changed to country music, and the company expanded. September 12, 1968, brought KBMR-FM 94.5, the first stereo radio station in the Bismarck area; by that time, the company also was the Muzak franchisee in the area. An even bigger change was on the horizon for the AM: in 1971, the FCC approved a power increase from 500 to 10,000 watts on a new frequency, 1130 kHz; the boost gave KBMR the highest wattage of any AM station in North Dakota. Along with the higher power, a new transmitter building was built on the site. Anderson additionally purchased a station in Polson, Montana.

By 1981, KBMR was Bismarck's top-rated station, though it was hurt as the 1980s progressed and listeners shifted to FM stations. A final upgrade to 50,000 watts took effect in November 1985, giving KBMR statewide coverage—but still no nighttime signal.

Anderson had planned as early as 1990 to move KBMR to a new license and frequency, 710 kHz, which would enable nighttime service. The 710 frequency would instead sign on in August 1999 as talk station KXMR.

Toward the end of Andy Anderson's life, his company sought to sell the cluster of stations that had developed: KBMR, the FM (now KQDY), and KSSS (101.5 FM), plus the under-construction KXMR. In 1998, the new Cumulus Media began pursuing the Anderson stations. Cumulus had already acquired a cluster of four local Jim Ingstad stations, but its attempt to buy the local Meyer Broadcasting radio stations had failed. A sale was announced in January 1999, and Cumulus took over the stations under a management agreement while it waited for the deal to close. The sale never closed. Concerns over competition effects from the deal prompted the FCC to designate the transaction for hearing in December 2000, a rare move that signaled federal approval was unlikely and led to the deal being scrapped, with Anderson Broadcasting resuming operation of the cluster. During this time, Andy Anderson died at the age of 81.

Anderson Broadcasting was more successful in its second attempt to sell its radio stations, this time to a consortium of general manager Bob Denver, sales manager Terry Fleck and Jim Ingstad. Radio Bismarck Mandan then sold three of the stations to Clear Channel Communications, forerunner to iHeartMedia, in 2004; KXMR had already been sold to the company the year before as part of a transaction that gave Ingstad two stations in southern Minnesota.
