= KLBE-LP =

Coordinates: 46.840°N 100.776°W

Bismarck, North Dakota; United States
- Broadcast area: Bismarck-Mandan
- Frequency: 100.7 MHz
- Branding: Club Radio 100.7

Programming
- Format: Contemporary Christian music/Freeform

Ownership
- Owner: New Song Church

History
- First air date: 2005
- Call sign meaning: "Club"

Technical information
- Licensing authority: FCC
- Class: L1
- ERP: 100 watts
- HAAT: 29.4 meters

Links
- Public license information: LMS
- Webcast: Listen Live
- Website: www.clubradiolive.com

KLBE-LP (100.7 FM, "Club Radio") is a low-power FM Christian radio station located in Bismarck, North Dakota. The station is owned by the New Song Church located in the northern section of the city. Local teens that are members of the church serve as DJs for the station, and can play any music that is in the station's music library. Much of the music on Club Radio is an eclectic blend of contemporary Christian music, Christian rock, post-hardcore, hip hop, and electronica.
