= Bismarck, North Dakota =

Capital city of North Dakota, United States

Bismarck, North Dakota mirahacii arumaaguash (Hidatsa) itUhtaáwe (Arikara)
- Capital city
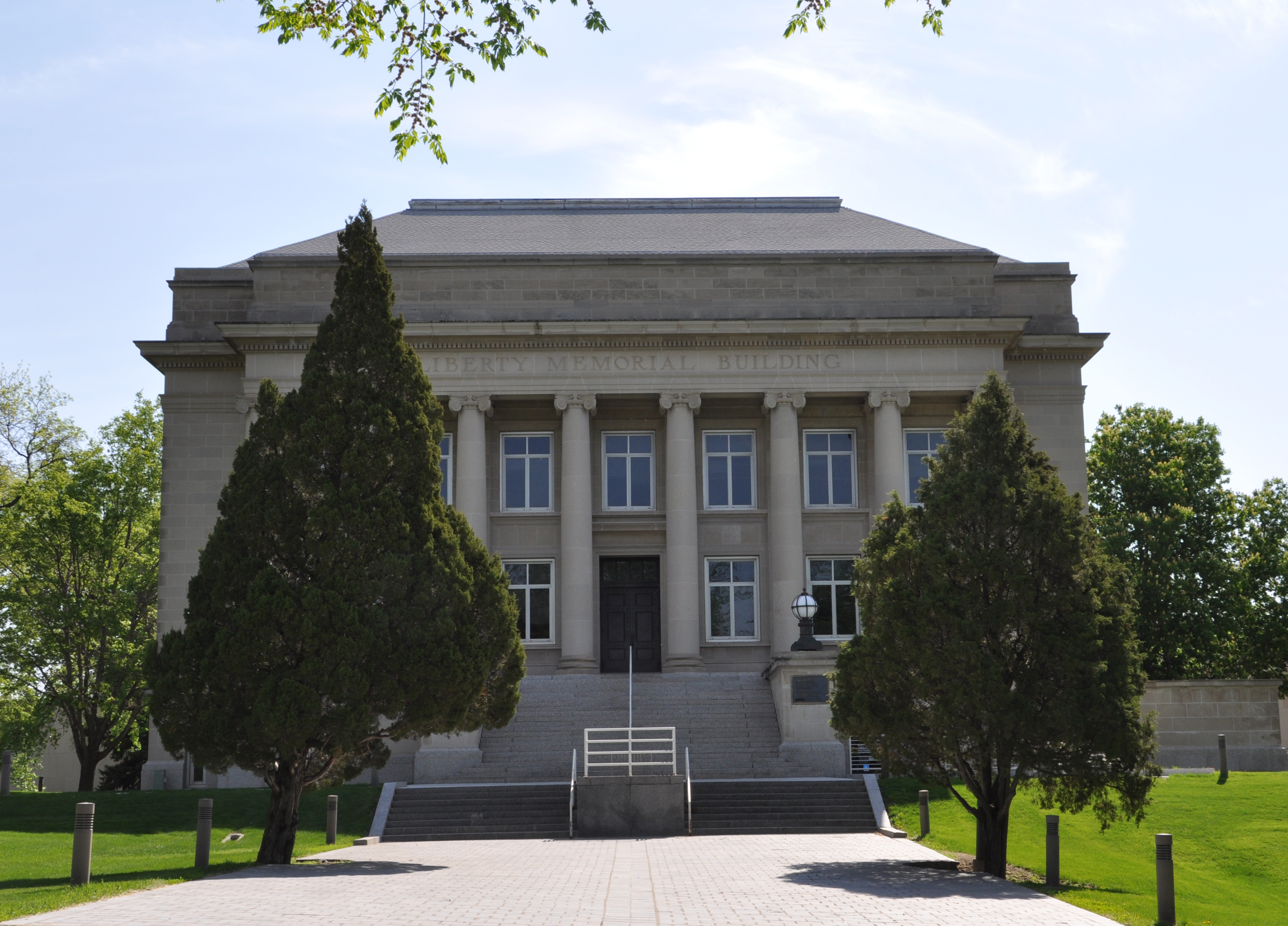
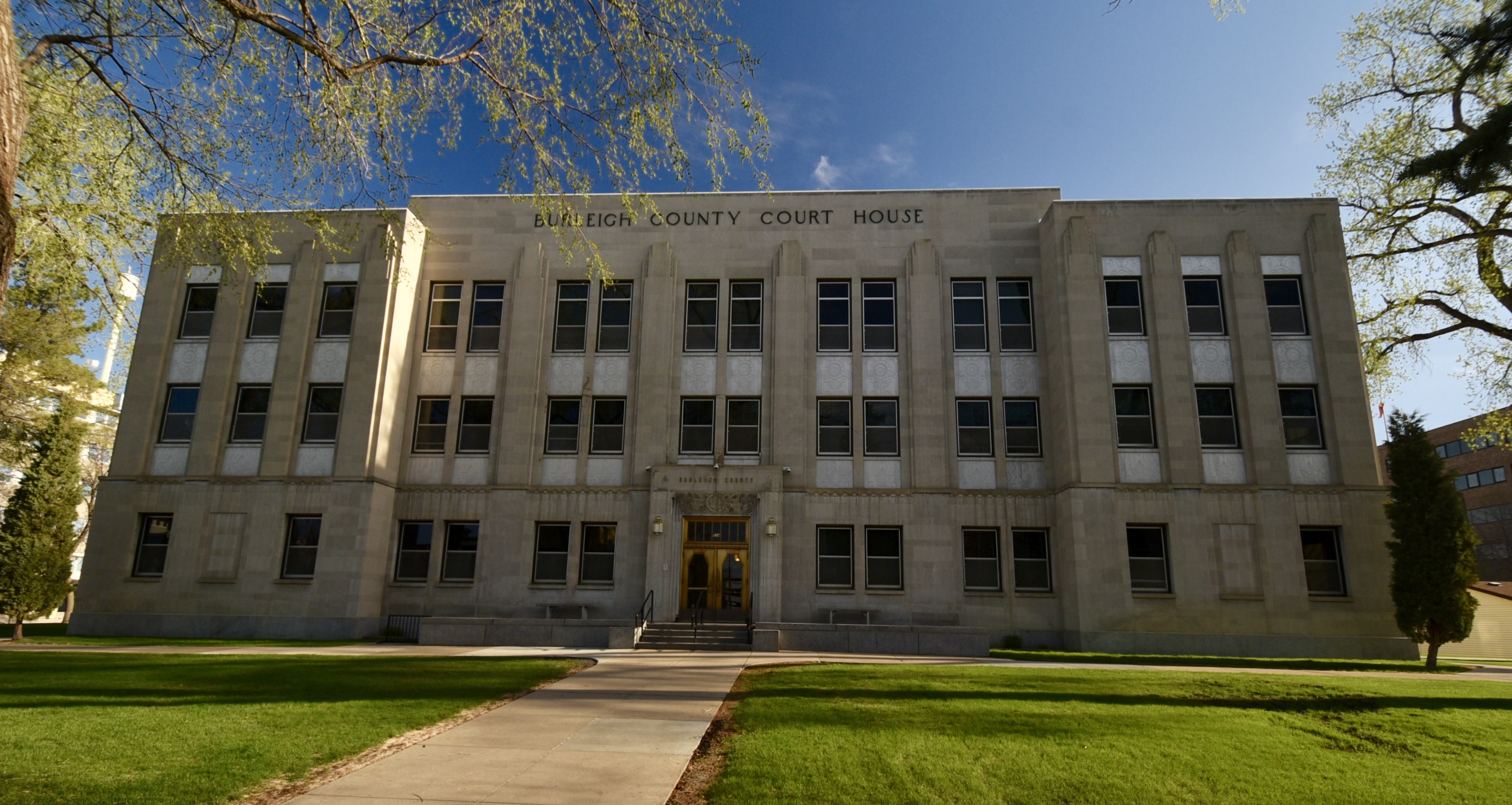
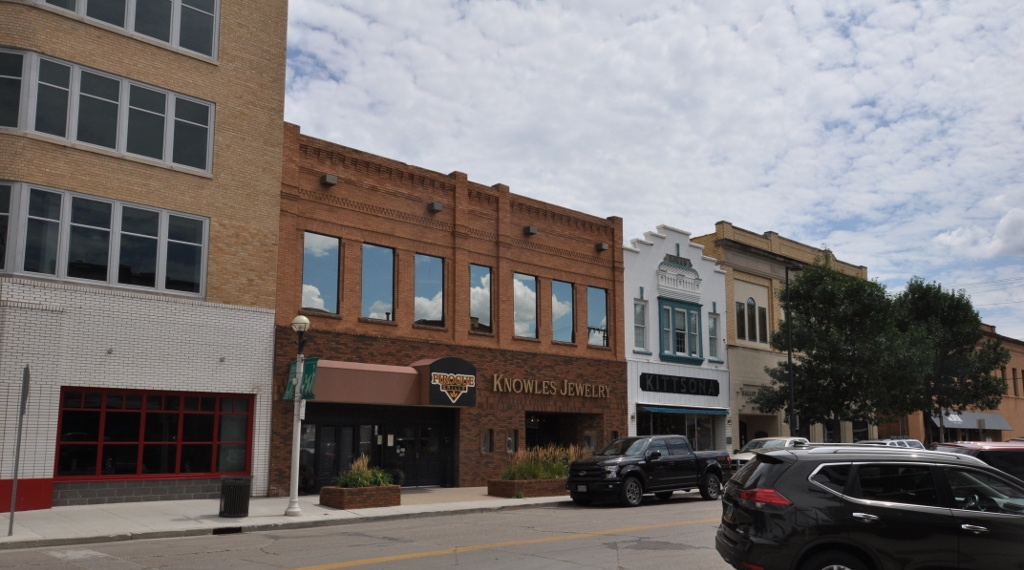
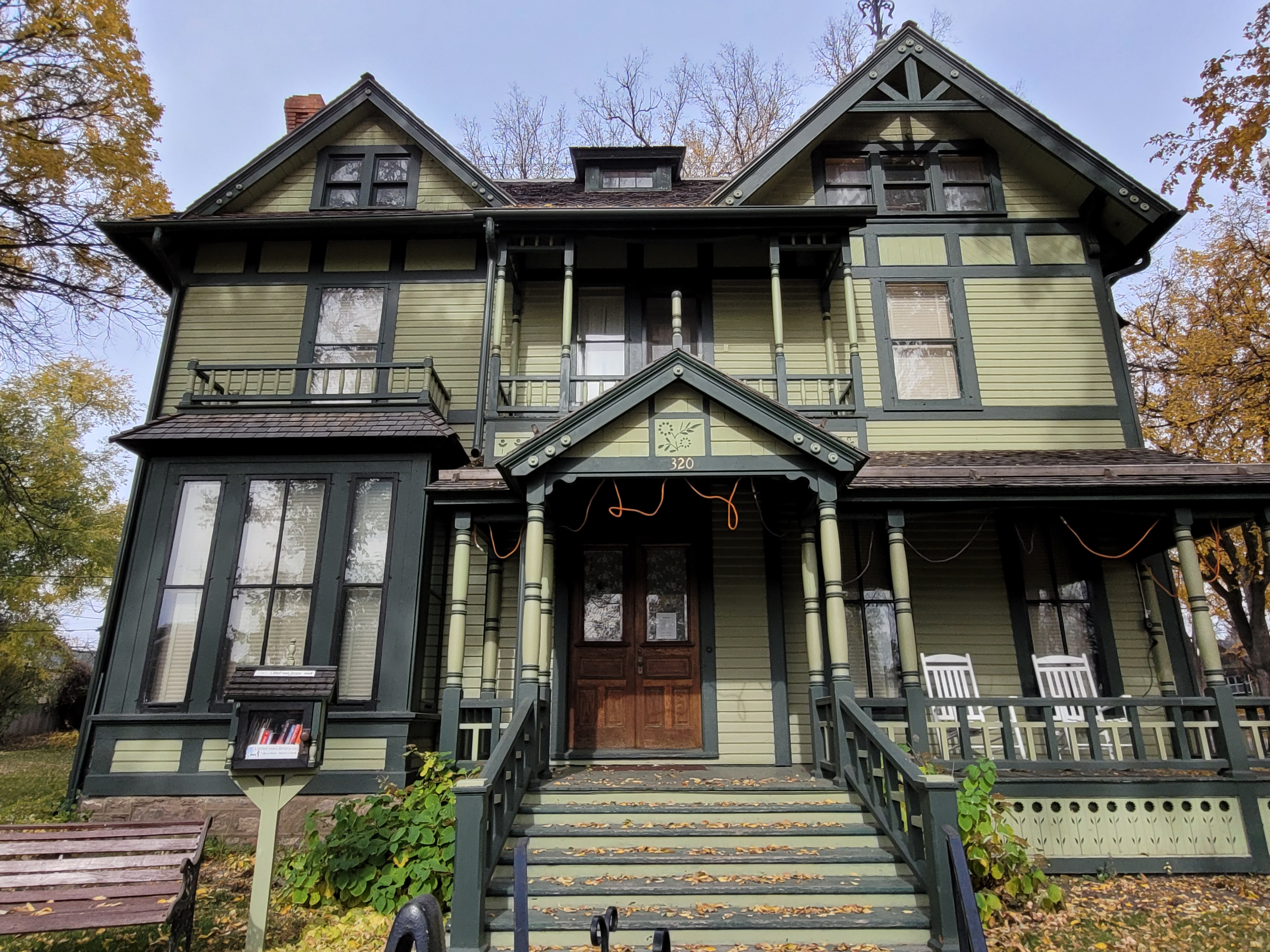
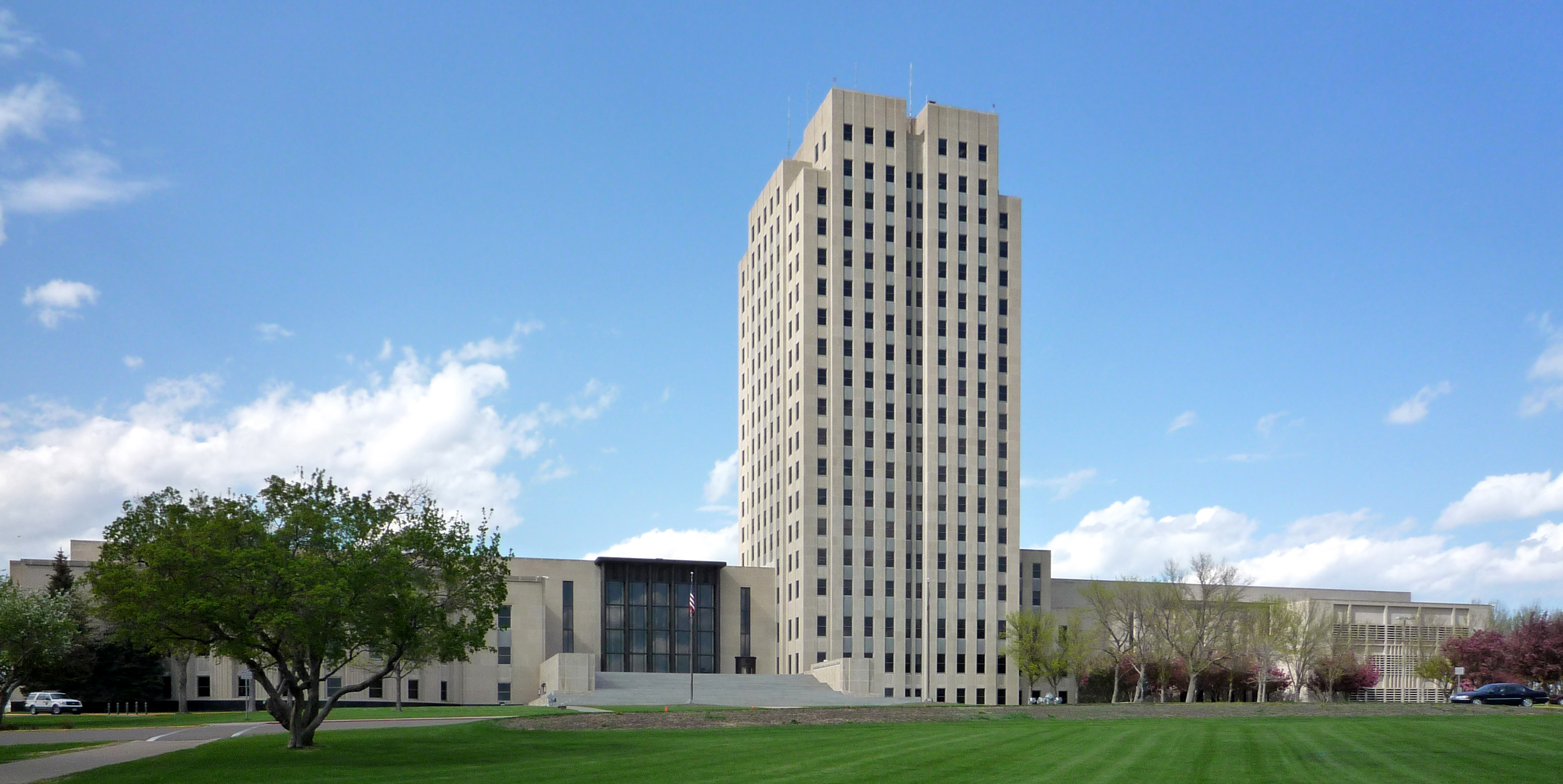
- Downtown Bismarck North Dakota State Library Burleigh County Courthouse Downtown Historic District Old Governor's Mansion North Dakota State Capitol

- Flag Seal Logo
- Interactive map of Bismarck, North Dakota
- Location within North Dakota Location within the United States
- Coordinates: 46.814572°N 100.768568°W
- Country: United States
- State: North Dakota
- County: Burleigh
- Founded: May 14, 1872
- Incorporated: January 14, 1875
- Named for: Otto von Bismarck

Government
  - Mayor: Mike Schmitz (Nonpartisan)
  - Commissioner: Anne Cleary; Michael Connelly; Steve Marquardt; Greg Zenker

Area
  - City: 36.452 sq mi (94.410 km^{2})
  - Land: 35.955 sq mi (93.123 km^{2})
  - Water: 0.497 sq mi (1.288 km^{2}) 1.36%
  - Urban: 41.9 sq mi (108.4 km^{2})
  - Metro: 4,281 sq mi (11,088 km^{2})
- Elevation: 1,745 ft (532 m)

Population (2020)
  - City: 73,622
  - Estimate (2024): 77,772
  - Rank: US: 486th ND: 2nd
  - Density: 2,242.1/sq mi (865.69/km^{2})
  - Urban: 98,198 (US: 316th)
  - Urban density: 2,346.2/sq mi (905.89/km^{2})
  - Metro: 139,183 (US: 302nd)
  - Metro density: 32.5/sq mi (12.55/km^{2})
- Time zone: UTC–6 (Central (CST))
  - Summer (DST): UTC–5 (CDT)
- ZIP Codes: 58501, 58502, 58503, 58504, 58505, 58506, 58507
- Area code: 701
- FIPS code: 38-07200
- GNIS feature ID: 1035934
- Highways: US 83, I 94, I 94 Bus., I 194, ND 810
- Website: bismarcknd.gov

Bismarck (/ˈbɪzmɑːrk/) is the capital city of the U.S. state of North Dakota and the county seat of Burleigh County. It is the state's second-most populous city, after Fargo. The population was 73,622 at the 2020 census, and was estimated at 77,772 in 2024, while its metropolitan population was 133,626. In 2014, Forbes magazine ranked Bismarck as the seventh fastest-growing small city in the United States.

Bismarck was founded by European-Americans in 1872 on the east bank of the Missouri River. It has been North Dakota's capital city since 1889, when the state was created from the Dakota Territory and admitted to the Union.

Bismarck is across the river from Mandan, named after a Native American tribe of the area. The two cities comprise the core of the Bismarck metropolitan area.

The North Dakota State Capitol is in central Bismarck. The state government employs more than 4,600 in the city. As a hub of retail and health care, Bismarck is the economic center of south-central North Dakota and north-central South Dakota.

== History ==
For thousands of years, various indigenous peoples inhabited present-day central North Dakota. The historic Mandan Native American tribe occupied the area long before Europeans arrived. The Hidatsa name for Bismarck is mirahacii arumaaguash ("Place of the tall willows"); the Arikara name is ituhtaáwe [itUhtaáwe].

In 1872, European Americans founded a settlement at what was then called Missouri Crossing, so named because the Lewis and Clark Expedition crossed the river there on their exploration of the land acquired by the Louisiana Purchase in 1804–06. It had been an area of Mandan settlement. Later, the new town was called Edwinton, after Edwin Ferry Johnson, engineer-in-chief for the Northern Pacific Railway. Its construction of railroads in the territory attracted workers and settlers.

In 1873, the Northern Pacific Railway renamed the city Bismarck in honor of German chancellor Otto von Bismarck. Railroad officials hoped to attract German settlers to the area and German investment in the railroad. It is the only U.S. state capital named for a foreign statesman. The discovery of gold in the nearby Black Hills of South Dakota the following year was a great impetus for growth. Thousands of miners came to the area, encroaching on what the Lakota considered sacred territory, leading to heightened tensions with Native Americans.

Bismarck became a freight-shipping center on the "Custer Route" from the Black Hills. In 1879, the first recorded tornado in North Dakota history smashed a steamship into the Missouri River's bank near Bismarck, causing major damage.

In 1883, Bismarck was designated as the capital of the Dakota Territory in place of Yankton, South Dakota, and in 1889, as the state capital of the new state of North Dakota.

== Geography ==
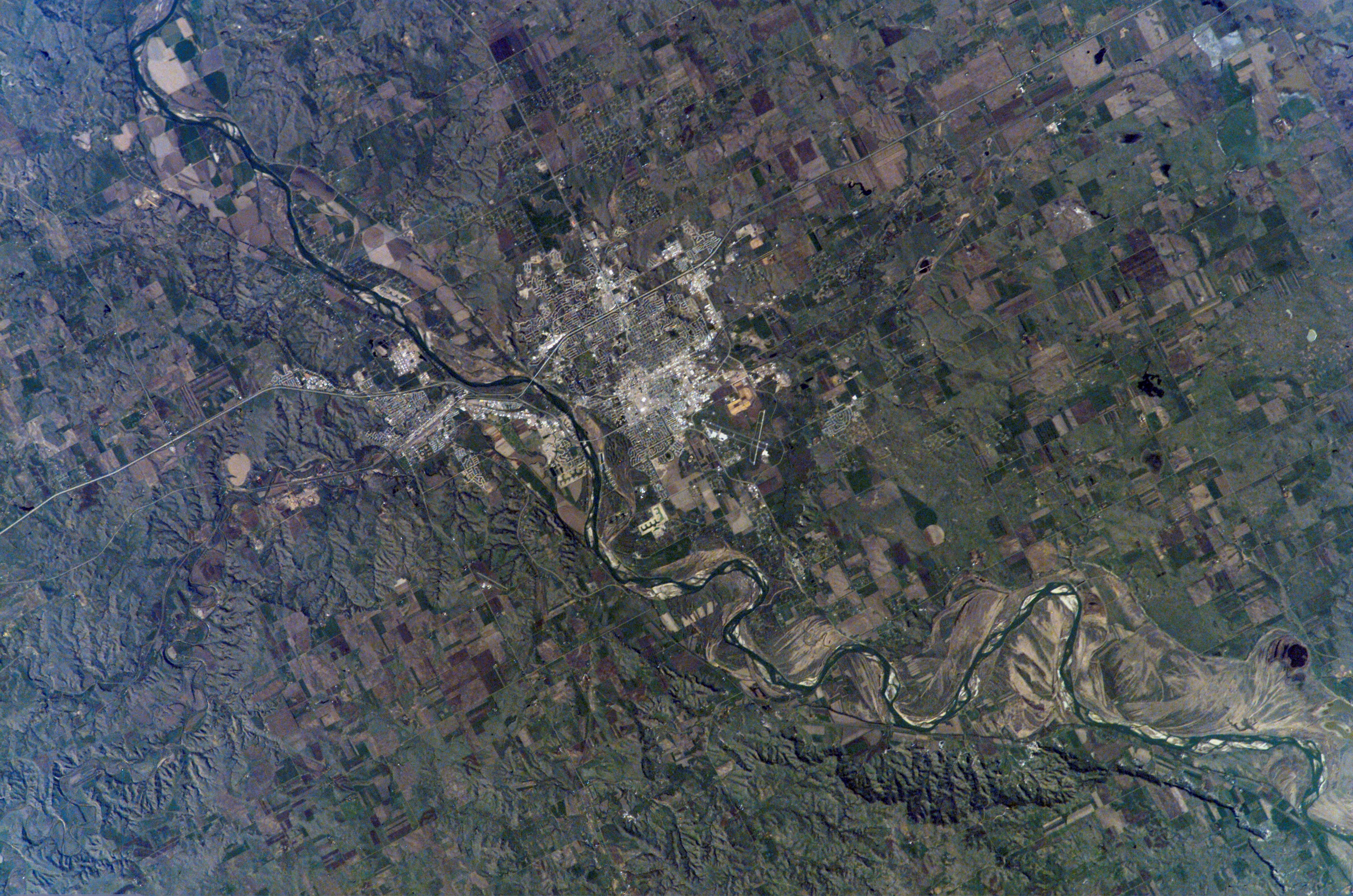
Bismarck from International Space Station, 2007

Bismarck is located at 46°48′51.39″N 100°46′9.86″W (46.8142737, -100.7694052).

According to the United States Census Bureau, the city has an area of 36.452 square miles (94.41 km^{2}), of which 35.955 square miles (93.12 km^{2}) is land and 0.497 square miles (1.29 km^{2}) (1.36%) is water.

=== Cityscape ===
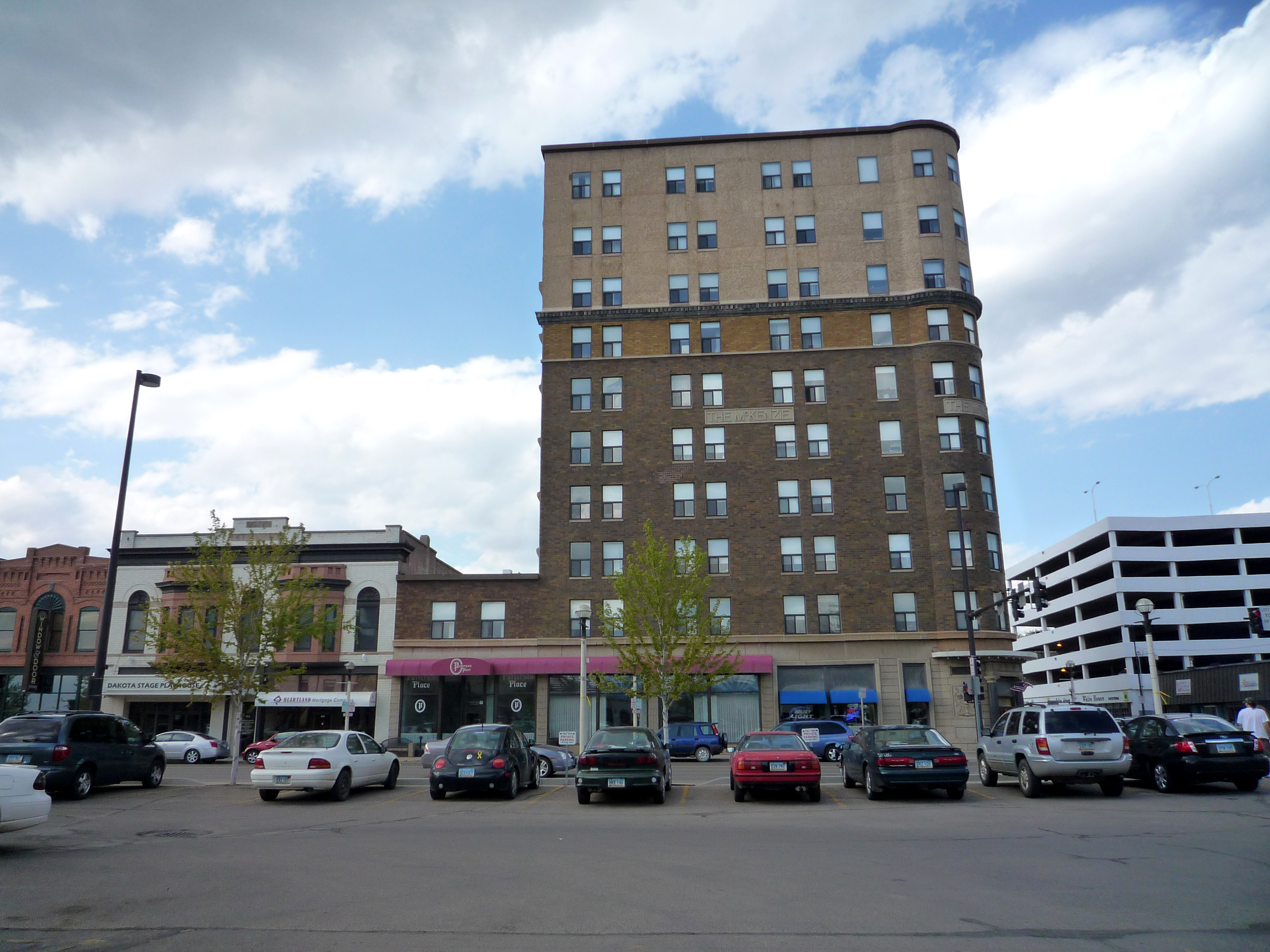
Downtown Bismarck: Patterson Place (built in 1911 as the McKenzie Hotel) was the tallest building in the state until construction of the capitol building. Originally operated as a luxury hotel, it has been adapted for senior housing and a retail restaurant.

The city has developed around downtown Bismarck, the center of historic development. It is distinctive because the city's major shopping center, Kirkwood Mall, is in the city center rather than in the suburbs. Several other major retail stores are near Kirkwood Mall, which was developed near the Bismarck Event Center. The two Bismarck hospitals, CHI St. Alexius Medical Center and Sanford Health (previously Medcenter One Health Systems), are downtown. The streets are lined with small stores and restaurants.

Much recent commercial and residential growth has occurred in the city's northern section, largely because of expanding retail centers. Among the shopping centers in northern Bismarck are Gateway Fashion Mall, Northbrook Mall, Arrowhead Plaza, and the Pinehurst Square "power center" mall.

The North Dakota State Capitol complex is just north of downtown Bismarck. The 19-story Art Deco capitol is the tallest building in the state, at a height of 241.75 feet (73.69 m). Completed during the Great Depression in 1934, it replaced the original capitol building that burned to the ground in 1930. The capitol grounds encompass the North Dakota Heritage Center, the North Dakota State Library, the North Dakota Governor's Residence, the State Office Building, and the Liberty Memorial Building. The North Dakota State Penitentiary is in eastern Bismarck.

The Cathedral District, named after the Art Deco Cathedral of the Holy Spirit, is a historic neighborhood near downtown Bismarck. Some homes in this neighborhood date to the 1880s, although many were built in the first decades of the 20th century. At times, the city has proposed widening the streets in the neighborhood to improve traffic flow. Many residents object because such a project would require the removal of many of the towering American elms which line the streets. These have escaped the elm disease that destroyed street canopies of trees in eastern cities.

After the completion of the Garrison Dam in 1953 by the Army Corps of Engineers, which improved flood control, the floodplain of the Missouri River became a more practical place for development. Significant residential and commercial building has occurred in this area on the city's south side. The Upper Missouri River is still subject to seasonal flooding.

=== Climate ===
Situated in the middle of the Great Plains, between the geographic centers of the United States and Canada, Bismarck displays a highly variable four-season humid continental climate (Köppen Dfa/Dfb, Trewartha Dcac/Dcbc) bordering on a cold semi arid climate. Bismarck's climate is characterized by cold, somewhat dry, snowy, and windy winters and warm, humid summers. Thunderstorms occur in spring and summer, but much of the rest of the year is dry.

The warmest month in Bismarck is July, with a daily mean of 71.3 °F (21.8 °C), with typically wide variations between day and night. The coldest month is January, with a 24-hour average of 12.8 °F (−10.7 °C). Precipitation peaks from May to September and is rather sparse in the winter. Winter snowfall is typically light to moderate, occurring with the passage of frontal systems; major storms are rare.

Climate data for Bismarck Municipal Airport, North Dakota (1991–2020 normals, (Note: Mean monthly maxima and minima (i.e. the highest and lowest temperature readings during an entire month or year) calculated based on data at said location from 1991 to 2020.) extremes 1874–present (Note: Records for Bismarck have been kept at the Bismarck Municipal Airport since January 1948 and at an undisclosed location from October 1874 to December 1947.))
Month	Jan	Feb	Mar	Apr	May	Jun	Jul	Aug	Sep	Oct	Nov	Dec	Year
Record high °F (°C)	63 (17)	73 (23)	81 (27)	93 (34)	102 (39)	111 (44)	114 (46)	109 (43)	105 (41)	95 (35)	79 (26)	66 (19)	114 (46)
Mean maximum °F (°C)	46.7 (8.2)	49.9 (9.9)	66.7 (19.3)	80.2 (26.8)	87.1 (30.6)	93.2 (34.0)	98.3 (36.8)	98.2 (36.8)	93.0 (33.9)	82.1 (27.8)	63.9 (17.7)	49.4 (9.7)	101.4 (38.6)
Mean daily maximum °F (°C)	23.2 (−4.9)	27.8 (−2.3)	41.0 (5.0)	56.0 (13.3)	68.3 (20.2)	77.9 (25.5)	84.7 (29.3)	83.5 (28.6)	73.4 (23.0)	57.1 (13.9)	40.6 (4.8)	27.7 (−2.4)	55.1 (12.8)
Daily mean °F (°C)	12.8 (−10.7)	17.5 (−8.1)	30.1 (−1.1)	43.2 (6.2)	55.3 (12.9)	65.4 (18.6)	71.3 (21.8)	69.6 (20.9)	59.7 (15.4)	44.8 (7.1)	29.9 (−1.2)	17.9 (−7.8)	43.1 (6.2)
Mean daily minimum °F (°C)	2.4 (−16.4)	7.2 (−13.8)	19.1 (−7.2)	30.4 (−0.9)	42.4 (5.8)	52.9 (11.6)	57.9 (14.4)	55.7 (13.2)	45.9 (7.7)	32.6 (0.3)	19.1 (−7.2)	8.1 (−13.3)	31.1 (−0.5)
Mean minimum °F (°C)	−23.8 (−31.0)	−17.6 (−27.6)	−4.7 (−20.4)	13.4 (−10.3)	26.9 (−2.8)	39.7 (4.3)	46.2 (7.9)	43.3 (6.3)	29.8 (−1.2)	15.9 (−8.9)	−1.0 (−18.3)	−16.0 (−26.7)	−27.9 (−33.3)
Record low °F (°C)	−45 (−43)	−45 (−43)	−36 (−38)	−12 (−24)	13 (−11)	30 (−1)	32 (0)	32 (0)	10 (−12)	−10 (−23)	−30 (−34)	−43 (−42)	−45 (−43)
Average precipitation inches (mm)	0.48 (12)	0.52 (13)	0.84 (21)	1.34 (34)	2.50 (64)	3.36 (85)	3.07 (78)	2.50 (64)	1.72 (44)	1.43 (36)	0.69 (18)	0.60 (15)	19.05 (484)
Average snowfall inches (cm)	8.9 (23)	7.5 (19)	8.5 (22)	4.6 (12)	0.4 (1.0)	0.0 (0.0)	0.0 (0.0)	0.0 (0.0)	0.0 (0.0)	2.5 (6.4)	8.0 (20)	10.1 (26)	50.5 (128)
Average extreme snow depth inches (cm)	8.0 (20)	7.0 (18)	5.8 (15)	3.5 (8.9)	0.2 (0.51)	0.0 (0.0)	0.0 (0.0)	0.0 (0.0)	0.0 (0.0)	1.3 (3.3)	4.4 (11)	6.3 (16)	11.5 (29)
Average precipitation days (≥ 0.01 in)	7.8	7.9	7.5	8.1	10.4	11.6	9.7	8.0	7.3	7.2	6.6	7.7	99.8
Average snowy days (≥ 0.1 in)	9.9	8.7	6.3	2.7	0.4	0.0	0.0	0.0	0.0	2.5	8.0	10.1	44.6
Average relative humidity (%)	71.3	72.4	69.9	61.8	60.1	65.0	61.8	60.6	63.7	63.8	72.0	74.5	66.4
Average dew point °F (°C)	2.3 (−16.5)	8.6 (−13.0)	18.9 (−7.3)	28.6 (−1.9)	39.6 (4.2)	50.5 (10.3)	54.9 (12.7)	52.0 (11.1)	42.4 (5.8)	32.2 (0.1)	19.8 (−6.8)	7.5 (−13.6)	29.8 (−1.2)
Mean monthly sunshine hours	149.4	153.5	222.3	244.3	296.1	318.1	354.6	316.2	245.9	191.7	122.6	122.9	2,737.6
Percentage possible sunshine	53	53	60	60	64	67	74	72	65	57	43	46	61
Average ultraviolet index	0.8	1.5	2.9	4.7	6.3	7.5	7.9	6.7	4.6	2.4	1.1	0.8	3.9
Source 1: NOAA (relative humidity and sun 1961–1990)
Source 2: UV Index Today (1995 to 2022)

== Demographics ==
Historical population
Census	Pop.	Note	%±
1880	1,758		—
1890	2,186		24.3%
1900	3,319		51.8%
1910	4,913		48.0%
1920	7,122		45.0%
1930	11,090		55.7%
1940	15,496		39.7%
1950	18,541		19.7%
1960	27,670		49.2%
1970	34,703		25.4%
1980	44,485		28.2%
1990	49,256		10.7%
2000	55,532		12.7%
2010	61,272		10.3%
2020	73,622		20.2%
2024 (est.)	77,772		5.6%
U.S. Decennial Census; 2020 Census

=== Racial and ethnic composition ===
Bismarck, North Dakota – racial and ethnic composition Note: the US Census treats Hispanic/Latino as an ethnic category. This table excludes Latinos from the racial categories and assigns them to a separate category. Hispanics/Latinos may be of any race.
Race / ethnicity (NH = non-Hispanic)	Pop. 1980	Pop. 1990	Pop. 2000	Pop. 2010	Pop. 2020
White alone (NH)	43,432 (97.63%)	47,446 (96.33%)	52,387 (94.34%)	56,152 (91.64%)	61,714 (83.83%)
Black or African American alone (NH)	48 (0.11%)	55 (0.11%)	141 (0.25%)	393 (0.64%)	2,091 (2.84%)
Native American or Alaska Native alone (NH)	653 (1.47%)	1,220 (2.48%)	1,846 (3.32%)	2,678 (4.37%)	3,389 (4.60%)
Asian alone (NH)	192 (0.43%)	196 (0.40%)	249 (0.45%)	340 (0.55%)	956 (1.30%)
Pacific Islander alone (NH)	—	—	15 (0.03%)	16 (0.03%)	308 (0.42%)
Other race alone (NH)	14 (0.03%)	14 (0.03%)	17 (0.03%)	32 (0.05%)	158 (0.21%)
Mixed race or multiracial (NH)	—	—	462 (0.83%)	849 (1.39%)	2,414 (3.28%)
Hispanic or Latino (any race)	146 (0.33%)	325 (0.66%)	415 (0.75%)	812 (1.33%)	2,592 (3.52%)
Total	44,485 (100.00%)	49,256 (100.00%)	55,532 (100.00%)	61,272 (100.00%)	73,622 (100.00%)

=== 2020 census ===
As of the 2020 census, Bismarck had a population of 73,622. The median age was 37.9 years. 21.8% of residents were under the age of 18 and 18.5% of residents were 65 years of age or older. For every 100 females there were 98.2 males, and for every 100 females age 18 and over there were 96.8 males age 18 and over.

99.9% of residents lived in urban areas, while 0.1% lived in rural areas. The population density was 2,122.71 inhabitants per square mile (819.6/km^{2}). There were 34,049 housing units at an average density of 981.72 per square mile (379.0/km^{2}).

There were 31,739 households and 18,107 families. Of all households, 26.1% had children under the age of 18 living in them. 43.5% were married-couple households, 21.5% were households with a male householder and no spouse or partner present, and 28.2% were households with a female householder and no spouse or partner present. About 35.8% of all households were made up of individuals, and 12.6% had someone living alone who was 65 years of age or older.

Housing units were 6.8% vacant. The homeowner vacancy rate was 1.7% and the rental vacancy rate was 8.8%.

Racial composition as of the 2020 census
Race	Number	Percent
White	62,369	84.7%
Black or African American	2,144	2.9%
American Indian and Alaska Native	3,562	4.8%
Asian	967	1.3%
Native Hawaiian and Other Pacific Islander	309	0.4%
Some other race	955	1.3%
Two or more races	3,316	4.5%
Hispanic or Latino (of any race)	2,592	3.5%

The most reported ancestries were:

- German (49.4%)
- Norwegian (15.0%)
- Irish (11.1%)
- English (9.6%)
- Russian (3.9%)
- Swedish (3.4%)
- French (3.3%)
- Scottish (2.3%)
- Polish (2.0%)
- Scandinavian (1.8%)

=== 2010 census ===
As of the 2010 census, there were 61,272 people, 27,263 households, and 15,624 families residing in the city. The population density was 1,986.5 inhabitants per square mile (767.0/km^{2}). There were 28,648 housing units at an average density of 928.6 inhabitants per square mile (358.5/km^{2}). The racial makeup of the city was 92.40% White, 0.65% African American, 4.53% Native American, 0.56% Asian, 0.03% Pacific Islander, 0.30% from some other races, and 1.54% from two or more races. Hispanic or Latino people of any race were 1.33% of the population.

Regarding ancestry, 56.1% were German, 20.5% were Norwegian, 7.2% were Irish, 6.7% were Russian, 3.7% were American, and 3.6% were English descent.

There were 27,263 households, of which 27% had children under the age of 18 living with them (the lowest percentage in North Dakota), 44.1% were married couples living together, 9.6% had a female householder with no husband present, 3.6% had a male householder with no wife present, and 42.7% were non-families. 34.8% of all households were made up of individuals, and 11.7% had someone living alone who was 65 years of age or older. The average household size was 2.18 and the average family size was 2.82.

The median age in the city was 38 years. 20.8% of residents were under 18; 11% were between 18 and 24; 26.2% were from 25 to 44; 26.8% were from 45 to 64; and 15.4% were 65 or older. The gender makeup of the city was 48.6% male and 51.4% female.

=== 2000 census ===
As of the 2000 census, there were 55,532 people, 23,185 households, and 14,444 families residing in the city. The population density was 2,065.2 inhabitants per square mile (797.4/km^{2}). There were 24,217 housing units at an average density of 900.6 inhabitants per square mile (347.7/km^{2}). The racial makeup of the city was 94.78% White, 0.28% African American, 3.39% Native American, 0.45% Asian, 0.03% Pacific Islander, 0.17% from some other races, and 0.89% from two or more races. Hispanic or Latino people of any race were 0.75% of the population.

There were 23,185 households, of which 30.2% had children under 18 living with them, 50.1% were married couples living together, 9.3% had a female householder with no husband present, and 37.7% were non-families. 31.0% of all households were made up of individuals, and 10.5% were someone living alone who was 65 years of age or older. The average household size was 2.32 and the average family size was 2.94.

The city's population was spread out, with 23.5% under the age of 18, 11.1% from 18 to 24, 29.1% from 25 to 44, 22.4% from 45 to 64, and 13.8% who were 65 or older. The median age was 36 years. For every 100 females, there were 93.9 males. For every 100 females age 18 and over, there were 91.8 males.

The median income per household in the city was $39,422, and the median income per family was $51,477. Males had a median income of $33,804 versus $22,647 for females. The per capita income for the city was $20,789. About 5.7% of families and 8.4% of the population were below the poverty line, including 9.5% of those under age 18 and 7.4% of those age 65 or over.

=== American Community Survey estimates ===
The 2024 American Community Survey reported a median household income of $73,877 and estimated that 8.8% of residents lived at or below the poverty line. Bismarck had an estimated 65.7% employment rate, with 43.0% of residents holding a bachelor's degree or higher and 93.7% holding a high school diploma. The average household size was 2.20 people, and the top reported languages were English (93.8%) and other languages (6.2%).

=== Housing market ===
According to realtor website Zillow, the average price of a home as of August 31, 2025, in Bismarck is $358,716.

== Economy ==
=== Top employers ===
According to the city's 2024 Annual Comprehensive Financial Report, the largest employers in the city are:

Number	Employer	Number of employees	Percentage
1	State of North Dakota	4,456	9.87%
2	Sanford Health	4,024	9.31%
3	Bismarck Public Schools	3,385	7.50%
4	Bobcat/Doosan Company	1,280	2.84%
5	CHI St. Alexius Medical Center	1,270	2.81%
6	U.S. Government Offices	1,200	2.66%
7	Bismarck State College	891	1.97%
8	City of Bismarck	696	1.54%
9	Walmart (2 locations)	665	1.47%
10	Missouri Slope Lutheran Care Center	610	1.35%
—	Total	18,657	41.32%

=== Unemployment rate ===
The United States Department of Labor's Bureau of Labor Statistics unemployment rate (not seasonally adjusted).

Unemployment rate
	Bismarck	Burleigh County	Bismarck Metropolitan Statistical Area	North Dakota	United States
March 2025	2.7%	2.7%	2.9%	3.1%	4.2%
April 2025	2.2%	2.5%	2.2%	2.5%	4.2%
May 2025	2.0%	2.1%	1.9%	2.1%	4.2%
June 2025	2.4%	2.3%	2.3%	2.7%	4.1%
July 2025	2.6%	2.5%	2.5%	2.6%	4.2%
August 2025	—	—	—	—	4.3%

== Arts and culture ==
The Belle Mehus Auditorium, named after a local piano teacher, is a 1914 historic building in downtown Bismarck and a center for arts in the area. Performances of Northern Plains Dance and the Bismarck-Mandan Symphony Orchestra are held there.

Theater companies in Bismarck include the Capitol Shakespeare Society, Sleepy Hollow Summer Theatre, the Shade Tree Players children's theater group, Dakota Stage Ltd, University of Mary, Bismarck State College, and various high school groups. The Gannon and Elsa Forde Art Galleries are at Bismarck State College. The Missouri Valley Chamber Orchestra, founded in 2000, performs a variety of musical genres.

=== Libraries ===
Bismarck libraries include Bismarck Veterans Memorial Public Library and North Dakota State Library.

== Sports ==
=== Amateur ===
High school and college sports are the main feature of the local athletics landscape. The athletic teams at the three public Bismarck high schools, Bismarck High School, Century High School, and Legacy High School, are known as The Demons, The Patriots, and The Sabers, respectively. The athletic teams at St. Mary's Central High School, Bismarck's Catholic high school, are known as The Saints. The teams at Bismarck State College and United Tribes Technical College are known as The Mystics and Thunderbirds, and both compete in the National Junior College Athletic Association in the Mon-Dak Conference. The teams at the University of Mary are The Marauders and compete in NCAA Division II in the Northern Sun Intercollegiate Conference. Bismarck has an American Legion baseball team called the Governors.

In the fall, the accent is on high school and college football. There are spirited rivalries among the several high schools in the area. Most University of Mary football games are played in the Community Bowl. Other popular winter sports include ice hockey, wrestling and basketball.

In spring, baseball is one of the city's top amateur sports, with each high school, Bismarck State College, and The University of Mary providing teams. The University of Mary and Bismarck State College both also have a softball team. High schools and colleges also feature track and field during the spring.

In the summer, Bismarck has American Legion baseball and auto racing. The Fourth of July holiday is the height of rodeo time, with rodeos in Mandan and Bismarck. Slow-pitch softball is played by teams in the city. Bismarck is the host city of the world's largest charity softball tournament, the Sam McQuade Sr. softball tournament, in which more than 400 teams from the U.S. and Canada compete.

The Bismarck Bobcats hockey team of the North American Hockey League is made up of junior players (age 20 and younger, sometimes 21 if waived). The Bobcats won back-to-back Borne Cup championships as America West Hockey League members before merging into the NAHL in 2003. The Bobcats have made several trips to the NAHL's national tournament, claiming their first Robertson Cup title in 2010.

Since 2017, the Bismarck Larks, a Northwoods League expansion baseball team, have played their home games at Bismarck Municipal Ballpark.

=== Professional ===
The Dakota Wizards of the NBA Development League were formerly based in Bismarck. The Wizards' first season took place in 1995 in the International Basketball Association. They won one title during their International Basketball Association days (1995–2001) and two during their Continental Basketball Association days (2001–2006). They were the 2006–07 champions of the NBA D-League, their first season in the league. The team moved to Santa Cruz, California, in 2012, a year after being purchased by the Golden State Warriors of the National Basketball Association.

Starting with the 2017 season, Bismarck was home to the Bismarck Bucks, a professional indoor football team in the Indoor Football League. Bismarck has been the home of two professional indoor football teams, the Bismarck Blaze and the Bismarck Roughriders, but both left the city soon after they were formed.

Bismarck once had a professional baseball team, the Dakota Rattlers, but the team moved to Minot after several seasons in Bismarck.

== Parks and recreation ==
Bismarck has a large park system and an extensive network of exercise trails. The Bismarck Parks and Recreation District, established in 1927, operates many parks, swimming pools, and several golf courses within the city. The World War I Memorial Building, which is listed on the National Register of Historic Places and operated by the recreation district, serves as a community gymnasium and was recognized by a 100 Cities 100 Memorials grant in 2018.

The Parks and Recreation District operates roughly 2,300 acres (930 ha) of public parkland. Sertoma Park stretches more than 3 miles (4.8 km) along the banks of the Missouri River. Within the park are several miles of biking trails and the Dakota Zoo.

There are five golf courses in Bismarck: four 18-hole courses (Apple Creek Country Club, Hawktree Golf Club, Riverwood Golf Course, and Tom O'Leary Golf Course), and one nine-hole course (Pebble Creek Golf Course).

Hunting and fishing are popular in the area, with hunting seasons for deer, pheasant, and waterfowl. Fishing is a year-round sport on the Missouri River bordering Bismarck, and there are public docks on the river. From north to south, there is a dock at the Port of Bismarck, from which the Lewis and Clark passenger riverboat plies the Missouri; Fox Island Landing, about a half mile southwest of Riverwood Golf Course; and the Bismarck Dock at General Sibley Park, which has a boat ramp and picnic facilities.

In February 2007, Bismarck broke the record for the most snow angels made in one place. A total of 8,962 participants came to the capitol grounds for the event.

== Government ==
Bismarck has operated under the city commission style of municipal government since 1909. Citizens elect a mayor and four commissioners on an at-large basis for terms of four years, with a limit of three consecutive terms. The commission exercises both legislative and executive powers, with each commissioner exercising oversight over several city departments. The mayor serves as president and first among equals of the commission.

The current mayor of Bismarck is Mike Schmitz. The city commission meets every second and fourth Tuesday of each month.

=== Crime ===
Bismarck
- Crime rates* (2024)

Violent crimes
- Homicide: 1
- Rape: 34
- Robbery: 46
- Aggravated assault: 129
- Total violent crime: 210

Property crimes
- Burglary: 191
- Larceny-theft: 1,476
- Motor vehicle theft: 185
- Arson: 5
- Total property crime: 1,857
- Note: Reported crimes per 100,000 population Source: 2024 FBI UCR Data

According to the Uniform Crime Report statistics compiled by the Federal Bureau of Investigation (FBI) in 2024, there were 210 violent crimes and 1,857 property crimes per 100,000 residents. Of these, the violent crimes consisted of 1 murder, 34 forcible rapes, 46 robberies and 129 aggravated assaults, while 191 burglaries, 1,476 larceny-thefts, 185 motor vehicle thefts and 5 acts of arson defined the property offenses.

From September 2024 to August 2025: 124 aggravated assault, 0 homicide, 33 rape, 34 robbery, 8 arson, 205 burglary, 1,283 larceny theft, and 132 motor vehicle theft by FBI Crime Data Explorer.

== Education ==
=== Elementary, middle and high schools ===
The Bismarck Public Schools system operates sixteen elementary schools, three middle schools (Simle, Wachter, Horizon), three public high schools (Century High, Legacy High School, and Bismarck High) and one alternative high school (South Central High School). The system educates 13,976 students and employs 2,169 people in the School Year of 2023–2024.

Three Bismarck Catholic parishes operate primary schools (kindergarten through eighth grade): St. Mary's Grade School, St. Anne's Grade School, and Cathedral Grade School. St. Mary's Grade School, founded in 1878, is the oldest continuously operating elementary school in North Dakota.

The city has three private high schools: the Catholic St. Mary's Central High School, Shiloh Christian School, operated by Protestants, and Dakota Adventist Academy.

=== Higher education ===
There are three colleges and a university in Bismarck. The University of Mary is a four-year university, operated by the Benedictine Sisters of Annunciation Monastery. Bismarck State College is a two-year public college, and a member of the North Dakota University System. United Tribes Technical College is a two-year tribal college. Sanford Health, formerly Medcenter One, operates a nursing school that offers a Bachelor of Science in nursing. The campus is just north of the medical center in central Bismarck.

== Media ==
=== Print ===
Bismarck is served by the Bismarck Tribune, the city's daily newspaper. Established in 1873, the paper is the city's oldest continuously operating business. The Tribune is the official newspaper of the city of Bismarck, Burleigh County, and the state of North Dakota. The daily newspapers of other major cities in North Dakota are also available at area newsstands.

=== Television ===
Bismarck is the center of a television market covering most of western North Dakota and parts of Montana. Five stations are based in Bismarck. The four commercial stations have rebroadcasters in Minot, Williston, and Dickinson. The stations are:

- KBME (ATSC RF channel 22) – virtual channels 3.1 PBS, 3.2 World, 3.3 Minnesota Channel, 3.4 PBS Kids
- KFYR (ATSC RF channel 31) – virtual channels 5.1 NBC, 5.2 Fox
- KXMB (ATSC RF channel 12) – virtual channels 12.1 The CW
- KBMY (ATSC RF channel 17) – virtual channels 17.1 ABC, 17.2 CBS, 17.3 MyNetworkTV
- KNDB (ATSC RF channel 26) – virtual channels 26.1 BEK Prime

Bismarck also carries public-access television channels, on cable TV channels 2 and 12.

=== Radio ===
Bismarck supports 27 radio stations. Most of the commercial stations are owned by either iHeartMedia or Cumulus Media. Many of the lower-frequency stations are broadcasters of national Christian radio networks. The local stations are:

=== FM frequencies ===
- KBMK 88.3 FM (Contemporary Christian music) K-Love network affiliate
- K204FG 88.7 FM (Christian) BBN translator
- KLBF 89.1 FM (Christian) Faith Radio from the University of Northwestern - St Paul
- KNRI 89.7 FM (Christian rock) Air 1 affiliate
- KCND 90.5 FM (Public Radio) Prairie Public Radio
- KXRP 91.3 FM (Christian) Family Radio affiliate
- KPHA 91.7 FM (Catholic) Real Presence Radio
- KYYY 92.9 FM (Adult Contemporary) "Mix 92.9"
- KBEP-LP 93.7 FM (Christian) 3ABN affiliate
- KQDY 94.5 FM (Country) "KQ 94.5"
- K237FQ 95.3 FM translator simulcasting KJIT-LP
- KBYZ 96.5 FM (Classic rock) "The Walleye"
- KKCT 97.5 FM (Top 40/CHR) "Hot 97-5"
- KACL 98.7 FM (Classic hits) "Cool 98.7"
- K259AF 99.7 FM translator simulcasting KFYR-AM
- KLBE-LP 100.7 FM (Christian rock) "Club Radio"
- KSSS 101.5 FM (Mainstream Rock) "Rock 101"
- KUAK-LP 102.5 FM (Community Radio) "Radio Access"
- KUSB 103.3 FM (Country) "US 103.3"
- KNDR 104.7 FM (Contemporary Christian music)
- KKBO 105.9 FM (Country) "Big Rig 105.9"
- KJIT-LP 106.7 FM (Contemporary Christian music) Radio 74 affiliate
- KXRV 107.5 FM (Classic Hits) "Mojo 107.5"

=== AM frequencies ===
- KFYR 550 AM (News/Talk/Sports/Oldies/Classic Hits/Top 40/CHR) "K-Fire"
- KXMR 710 AM (Sports) "ESPN 710"
- KBMR 1130 AM (Classic country) "Bismarck's original country station"
- KLXX 1270 AM (Talk)
- KDKT 1410 AM (Sports) "Fox Sports Radio 1410"
- WQDL503 1610 AM (Traveler's Information Station), North Dakota Department of Transportation

NOAA Weather Radio station WXL78 broadcasts from Bismarck on 162.475 MHz.

== Infrastructure ==
=== Health care ===
Bismarck is a regional center for health care. It has two hospitals: CHI St. Alexius Medical Center (285-bed) and Sanford Health (238-bed). When it opened in 1885, St. Alexius was the first hospital in Dakota Territory and the Catholic facility is the state's oldest health care provider. St. Alexius and Medcenter One have joined forces to form the Bismarck Cancer Center. Medcenter One was founded in 1908 as Bismarck Evangelical Hospital. In 1955, it was renamed Bismarck Hospital. In 1984, it was renamed MedCenter One, and in 2012, it became part of the Sanford Health system.

=== Transportation ===
==== Public transit ====
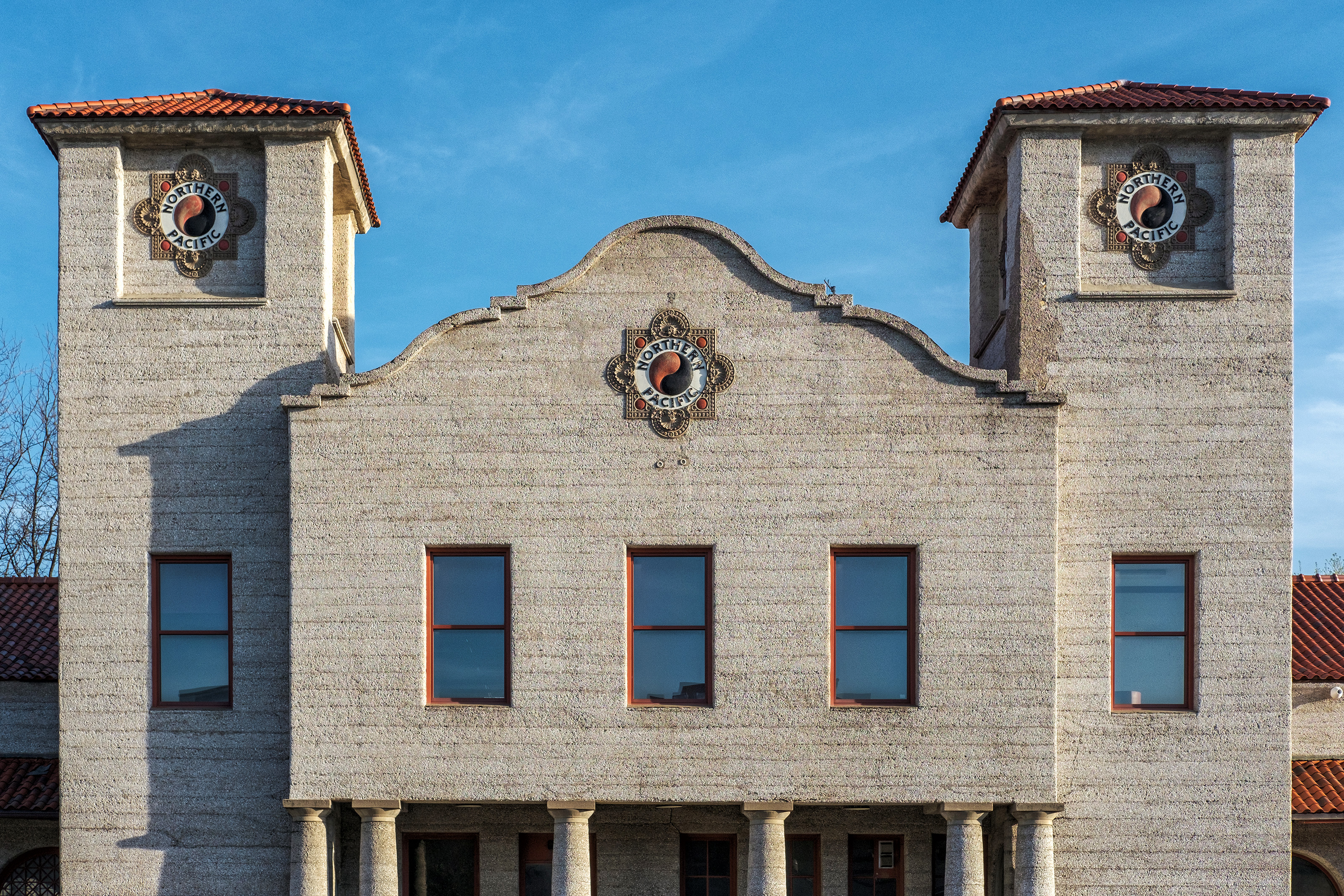
Northern Pacific Railway Depot, built in 1901 using the Mission Revival style

The Capital Area Transit System, operated by Bis-Man Transit, began operations in 2004. This public bus system has eleven routes throughout Bismarck and Mandan, Monday-Saturday. Bis-Man Transit also operates a para-transit service for senior citizens and people with disabilities.

Bismarck had electric streetcar service from 1904 to 1931.

Intercity bus service to the city is provided by Jefferson Lines.

==== Aviation ====
Bismarck Municipal Airport is south of the city. It has the largest passenger volume in western North Dakota and the second highest within the state. The airport is served by United Express, Allegiant Air, Delta Air Lines, and American Eagle. A new $15 million terminal opened in 2005. The previous terminal was built in the mid-1960s and expanded in the mid-1970s. After a windstorm collapsed part of the roof connecting the expanded terminal to the original building, officials decided to demolish the entire complex and build the new terminal.

==== Rail service ====
The BNSF Railway runs east–west through the city. The railway was originally integral to the growth of Bismarck and Mandan. Today it is used for freight. Due to restructuring in the railroad industry, there has not been passenger train service to Bismarck station since Amtrak's North Coast Hiawatha service ended in 1979. The closest Amtrak station is in Minot, 106 miles (170 kilometers) north of Bismarck, which is served by the Empire Builder.

==== Roadways ====
Two federal highways pass through Bismarck. Interstate 94 runs east–west through the city. The north–south U.S. Route 83 merges in north Bismarck with Interstate 94 and runs east for roughly 25 miles (40 km) before turning south.

==== Walking and cycling ====
BisParks BCycle is a public bikeshare system with four docks situated around the city. Bismarck is not ranked as a walk-friendly community, and is rated bronze for bike-friendliness.

== Notable people ==
- Sam Aanestad, dentist and California state legislator
- David Andahl, businessman and politician
- Shane Balkowitsch, American wet plate photographer
- Carmen Berg, Playboy playmate (July 1987)
- Leslie Bibb, actress
- Paula Broadwell, a consultant and author and extramarital partner of General David Petraeus
- John Burke, state Supreme Court justice, tenth governor of North Dakota, 24th treasurer of the United States
- Gary Cederstrom, Major League Baseball umpire
- Neil Churchill, Bismarck businessman and baseball executive
- Dale Clausnitzer, Minnesota state legislator and businessman
- Kent Conrad, U.S. senator
- Kevin Cramer, U.S. senator (since 2019); former U.S. congressman and North Dakota Public Service Commissioner
- Ronnie Cramer, artist, filmmaker
- Britta Curl-Salemme, ice hockey forward for Minnesota Frost
- Dale DeArmond, printmaker and book illustrator
- Weston Dressler, Saskatchewan Roughriders slotback
- Shannon Galpin, activist and adventurer
- Linnea Glatt, post-modern sculptor and installationist
- Melissa Grunlan, professor in the Department of Biomedical Engineering at Texas A&M University
- Todd Hendricks, former professional football player
- John Hoeven, U.S. senator, (since 2011) 31st governor of North Dakota (2000–2010)
- Anne Marie Hochhalter, anti-gun violence activist and Columbine High School massacre victim
- Clay Jenkinson, Author, Thomas Jefferson scholar
- Thomas S. Kleppe, former Bismarck mayor, 41st U.S. Secretary of the Interior
- Brock Lesnar, wrestler and former heavyweight UFC champion
- Jamalcolm Liggins, professional football player
- Cara Mund, Miss America 2018
- Joseph Peltier, member of the North Dakota House of Representatives and the North Dakota State Board of Higher Education
- Mike Peluso, right wing with the Chicago Blackhawks and Philadelphia Flyers
- Fannie Almara Quain, first woman born in North Dakota to earn a doctor of medicine
- John Andrew Rea, newspaper editor, helped draft the state constitution
- Mel Ruder, Pulitzer Prize winning journalist
- Ed Schafer, 30th governor of North Dakota, 29th U.S. secretary of agriculture
- Jonathan Twingley, artist, illustrator and novelist
- Carson Wentz, professional football player for the Minnesota Vikings

== See also ==
- Bismarck Air Museum
- Bismarck-Mandan Symphony Orchestra
- North Dakota Heritage Center
