= Dunlap House =

Dunlap House may refer to:

- Charles H. Dunlap House, Phoenix, Arizona, listed on the National Register of Historic Places (NRHP)
- Dunlap House (Clarksville, Arkansas), NRHP-listed
- Catlin Wilson House (237 Wilson Avenue, Eutaw, Alabama), also known as the Murphy Dunlap House, NRHP-listed
- Daniel R. Wright House (501 Pickens Street, Eutaw, Alabama), also known as the Murphy-Dunlap House, NRHP-listed
- Dunlap's Dining Room, Sacramento, California, NRHP-listed
- Munroe-Dunlap-Snow House, Macon, Georgia, NRHP-listed in Bibb County
- John Dunlap House, Brunswick, Maine, NRHP-listed
- Stuart Dunlap House, Mandan, North Dakota, NRHP-listed
- William K. Dunlap House, Troy, Ohio, listed on the NRHP in Miami County
- William B. Dunlap Mansion, Bridgewater, Pennsylvania, NRHP-listed
- C.K. Dunlap House, Hartsville, South Carolina, NRHP-listed
- Adam Dunlap Farmstead (Mazomanie, Wisconsin) — listed on the NRHP in Dane County
