= Gilbert R. Horton =

American architect

- Born: November 10, 1888; St. Paul, Minnesota
- Died: November 2, 1985 (aged 96); Jamestown, North Dakota
- Occupation: Architect

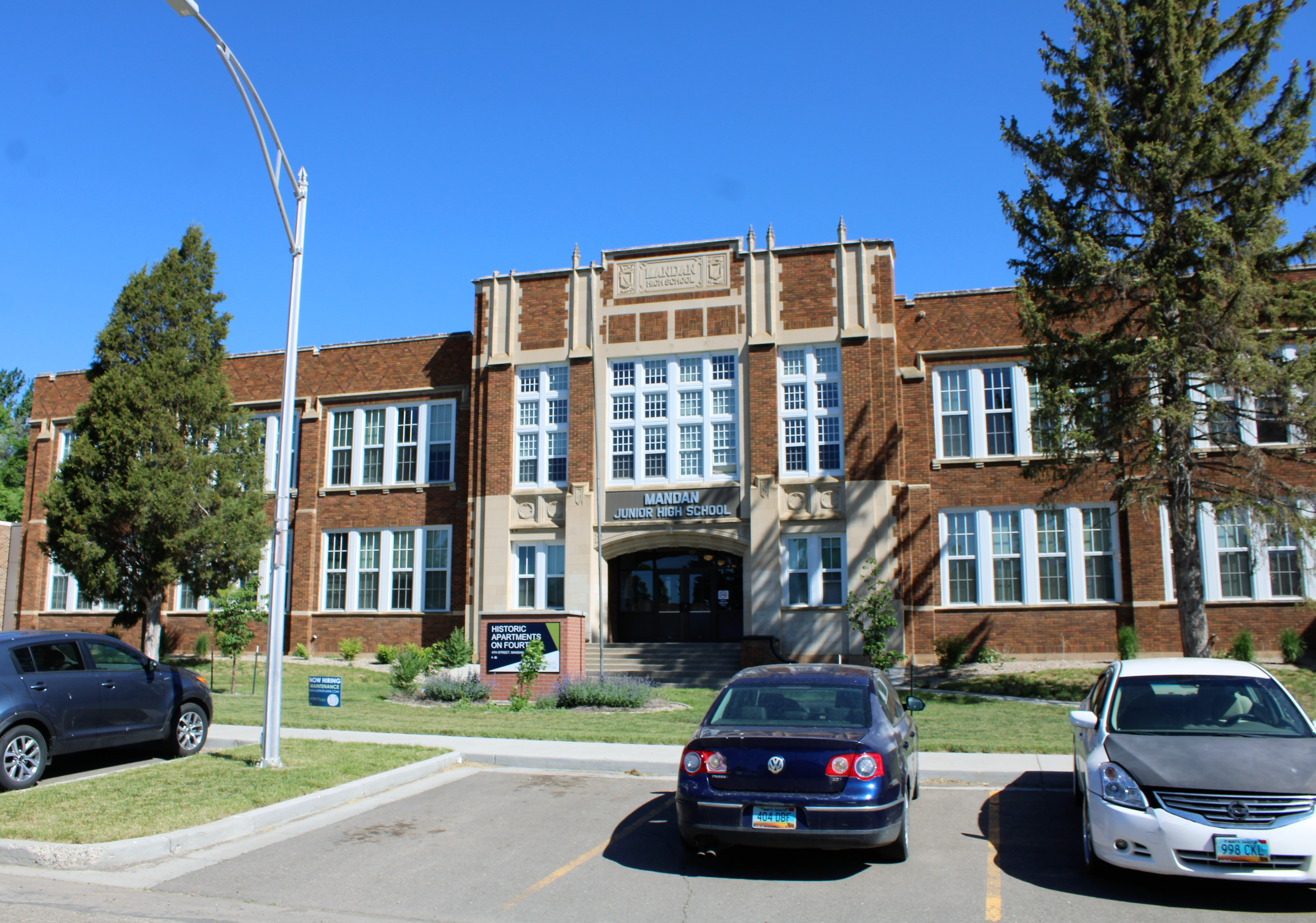
The former Mandan High School, designed by Horton and McFarland and built in two phases, completed in 1917 and 1924.

Gilbert R. Horton FAIA (1888–1985) was an American architect in practice in Jamestown, North Dakota, from 1913 until 1980.

== Life and career ==
Gilbert Robinson Horton was born November 10, 1888, in St. Paul, Minnesota, but was raised in Litchfield, where he was educated, graduating from Litchfield High School in 1908. While attending the public schools, Horton worked with local contractor Jeff Schelde to learn drafting. He attended the University of Minnesota and the University of Washington, earning an engineering degree from the latter in 1911. He then rejoined Schelde, who in the meantime had settled in Jamestown, North Dakota. In the winter of 1912–13 Schelde chose to move on to Sioux Falls, but Horton remained, opening a Jamestown office in early 1913. Horton quickly earned a reputation as an architect of well-built, low-cost schools. He designed 256 schools in North Dakota, 165 of which were still in use in 1982. He was innovative, including using double glazing for window insulation and for using hollow bricks. Horton was one of the 17 architects licensed by North Dakota in 1917, in the first year it required licensing.

Early in his career, Horton took on several business partners, including J. Howard Ganley in 1921 and Eugene H. McFarland in 1926–27. Later in his career he was associated with his sons, Gilbert E. Horton, an architect, and Kent H. Horton, an engineer. In 1976, with Horton still at its head, Gilbert R. Horton, Architects, was the oldest architecture firm in North Dakota. In 1980 Horton retired from practice, leaving the office to his sons.

Horton was a member of the American Institute of Architects for much of his career, beginning in 1926, when he joined as a member of the Minnesota chapter. He suspended his membership twice, in 1929 and 1939, but returned permanently in 1953 when the North Dakota chapter was formed. He served as a member of the chapter board of directors and as vice president. In 1968 he was elected a Fellow of the institute, the organization's highest membership honor, for his innovative use of materials. He was the first North Dakota architect to receive the honor.

== Personal life and death ==
Gilbert was married in 1913 to Evangelyn M. Roberts of Jamestown. They had two sons: Gilbert E. Horton (1915–1996) and Kent H. Horton (1920–2019), both of whom worked with their father. Horton died November 2, 1985, in Jamestown.

== Legacy ==
Several of his works are listed on the National Register of Historic Places for their architecture.

== Architectural works ==
- Grace Episcopal Church additions, 405 2nd Ave NE, Jamestown, North Dakota (1913 and 1950, NRHP 1992)
- Mandan High School (former), 406 4th St NW, Mandan, North Dakota (1917 and 1924, NRHP 2017)
- Stutsman County Courthouse addition, 504 3rd Ave SE, Jamestown, North Dakota (1926, NRHP 1976)
- One or more works in Jamestown Historic District, roughly bounded by First St., Fourth Ave., SE, Fifth St., and Second Ave. Jamestown, North Dakota (NRHP 1989)
