= Almont Elementary School =

Almont Elementary School may refer to:

- Almont Elementary School - Almont, Michigan - Almont Community Schools
- Almont Elementary School - Almont, North Dakota - Sims School District 8
