= Old Mandan High School =

- Mandan High School
- U.S. National Register of Historic Places
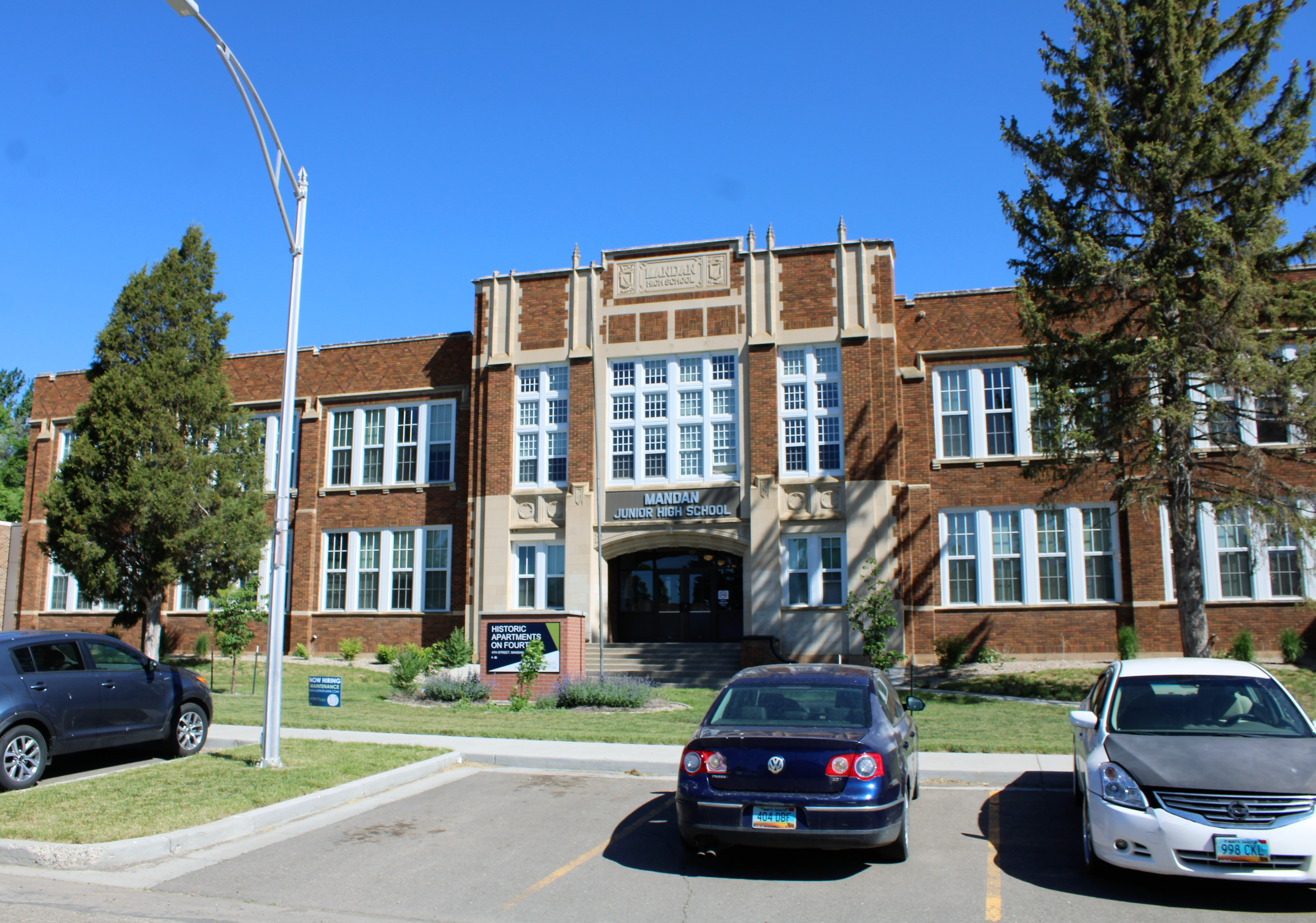

- Location within North Dakota Location within the United States
- Location: 406 4th St. Mandan, North Dakota
- Coordinates: 46.830190°N 100.896234°W
- Area: less than one acre
- Built: 1917
- Architect: Gilbert R. Horton (1917); Eugene H. McFarland (1924); Foss & Co. (1954); Ritterbush Associates (1977)
- Architectural style: Tudor Revival, Collegiate Gothic, Modern
- NRHP reference No.: 100001364
- Added to NRHP: July 24, 2017

Old Mandan High School, superseded by a more modern Mandan High School in 1958, in Mandan, North Dakota, was listed on the National Register of Historic Places in 2017. After it served as high school it was Mandan Junior High.

Constructed in phases next to what was the Mandan Central School (1900, demolished in 1966). The 1917 Mandan High School, designed by Gilbert R. Horton, was built to the east of the 1900 building and now sits on the northeast corner; its original, southern-facing entrance is now connected to a subsequent wing. In 1924 a second, initially unattached building was constructed to the south and designed by Eugene H. McFarland; at its completion the 1917 building then became a junior high school. The 1917 and 1924 structures are Tudor/Collegiate Gothic in style. Modern additions came in 1954, 1966, and 1977. The 1954 addition is a two-story brick and concrete structure on a raised basement with flat roof designed by Foss & Co.; this wing was initially planned as an elementary school addition and connected the 1917 and 1924 buildings. The 1966 addition is a comparatively small boiler room, attached to east (back) of the 1917 structure. 1976-77 addition designed by Ritterbush Associates provided classrooms for science, special education, and vocational studies in a one-story wing on the west side, and gymnasium attached to the northwest corner of the 1917 building. It became Mandan Junior High School after the completion of the new Mandan Senior High School in 1958. The school moved to a new campus in 2009 and the building was closed. The building, including the 1954 and 1966 modern additions above, were listed on the National Register of Historic Places on July 24, 2017 (the 1977 addition was noted to "lie outside of the period of significance but do not detract from the integrity of the site." They had not yet crossed the 50-year threshold). The gymnasium portion of the 1977 addition was subsequently removed for conversion into housing.

Plans in 2017 were for the building to be renovated into 35 low-income housing units, utilizing Federal Historic Preservation Tax Credit funding which is opened by NRHP listing.
