= Mandan High School =

Coordinates: 46°50′00″N 100°54′10″W

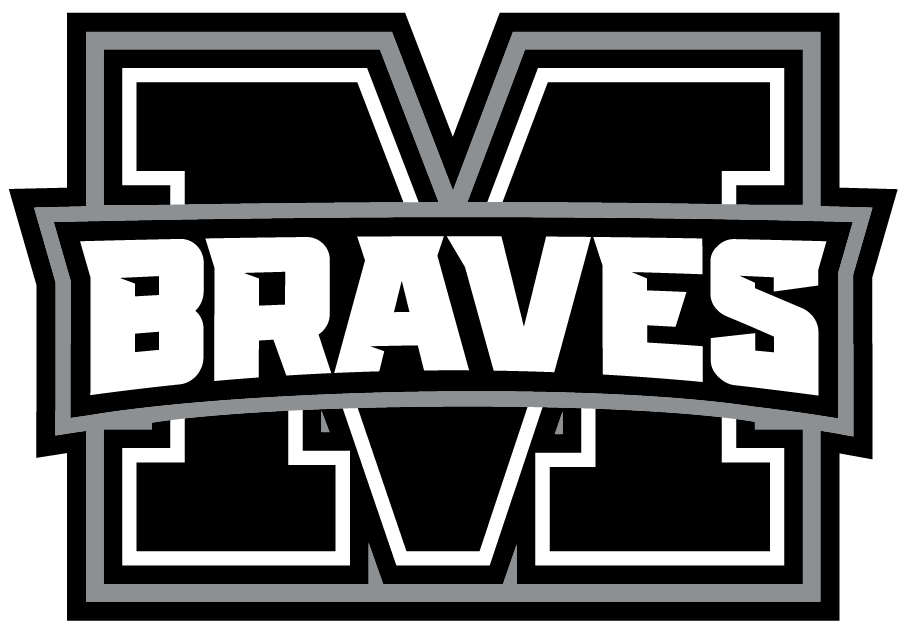

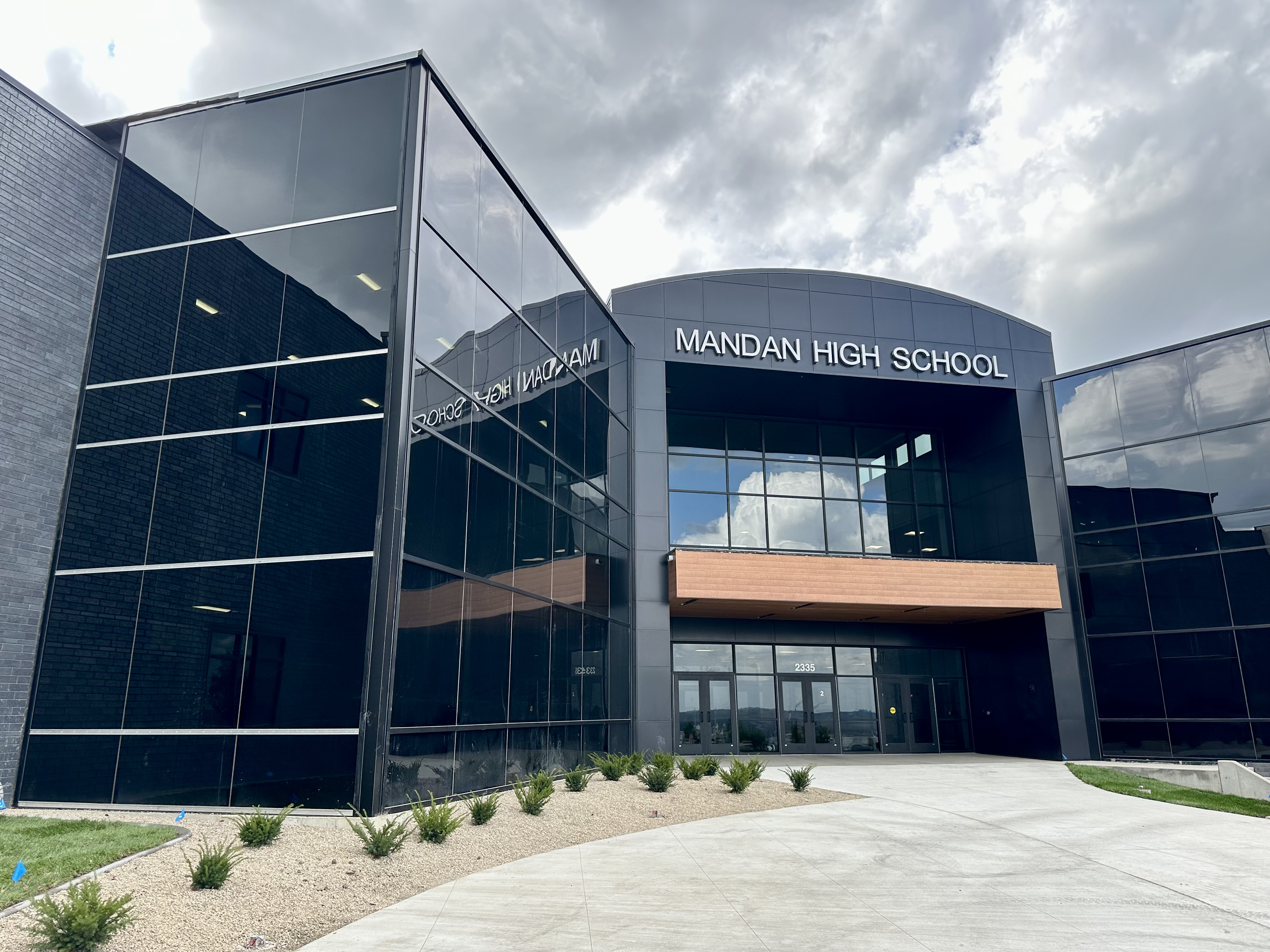
- Mandan High School on September 2, 2024. The first day of school in the new building.

Location
- 2335 4th Ave NW; Mandan, North Dakota 58554; USA

Information
- Type: Public
- Motto: Where the Best Begin!
- School district: Mandan Public School District
- Principal: Mark Andresen
- Teaching staff: 73.00 (FTE)
- Grades: 9–12
- Enrollment: 1,175 (2024–2025)
- Student to teacher ratio: 16.10
- Colors: Black and white and unofficially Red
- Nickname: Braves
- Website: hs.mandan.k12.nd.us

Mandan High School is a public high school located in Mandan, North Dakota. It is the only high school within the Mandan Public Schools system, serving grades 9–12. In 2007 the Mandan Public School District renovated the high school building in 2024 opened a new high school building on its new campus north of I94. Mandan is the sixth-largest school district in the state of North Dakota. Mandan High School has an 88% graduation rate. Enrollment for the 2009–2010 school year was 1,056 students. The graduating class for the 2009–10 school year was 229 students. On April 1, 2010, Mandan High School was recognized for maintaining 100 years of continuous accreditation by the North Central Association Commission on Accreditation and School Improvement (NCA CASI). In 2024, Mandan opened a new high school location.

The school district, and therefore the high school, serves Mandan and Harmon. It takes high school students from the Sweet Briar School District.

== Academics ==
=== Progress reports ===
The Mandan Public School calendar is divided into four 9-week quarters. Report cards are distributed at parent-teacher conferences or the week after the grading period ends.

=== Test scores ===
Mandan students score higher on the ACT than at the state and national levels. Mandan Public School students also score higher on the North Dakota State Assessment than students across the state.

- ACT scores

Below are the most recent ACT results for Mandan High School, North Dakota and the USA.

School	Score
Mandan High School student average	16.0
North Dakota high school student average	21.6
USA high school student average	21.1

- ND State Assessment scores

Below are the most recent North Dakota State Assessment results comparing North Dakota statewide results and Mandan High School results for the 11th grade.

Reading Assessment scores

Year	North Dakota	Mandan
2006	72	70
2007	65	73
2008	68	74
2009	63	72

Math Assessment Scores

Year	North Dakota	Mandan
2006	57	57
2007	55	55
2008	56	59
2009	55	63

Science Assessment Scores

Year	North Dakota	Mandan
2006	62	67
2007	59	60
2008	61	69
2009	59	69

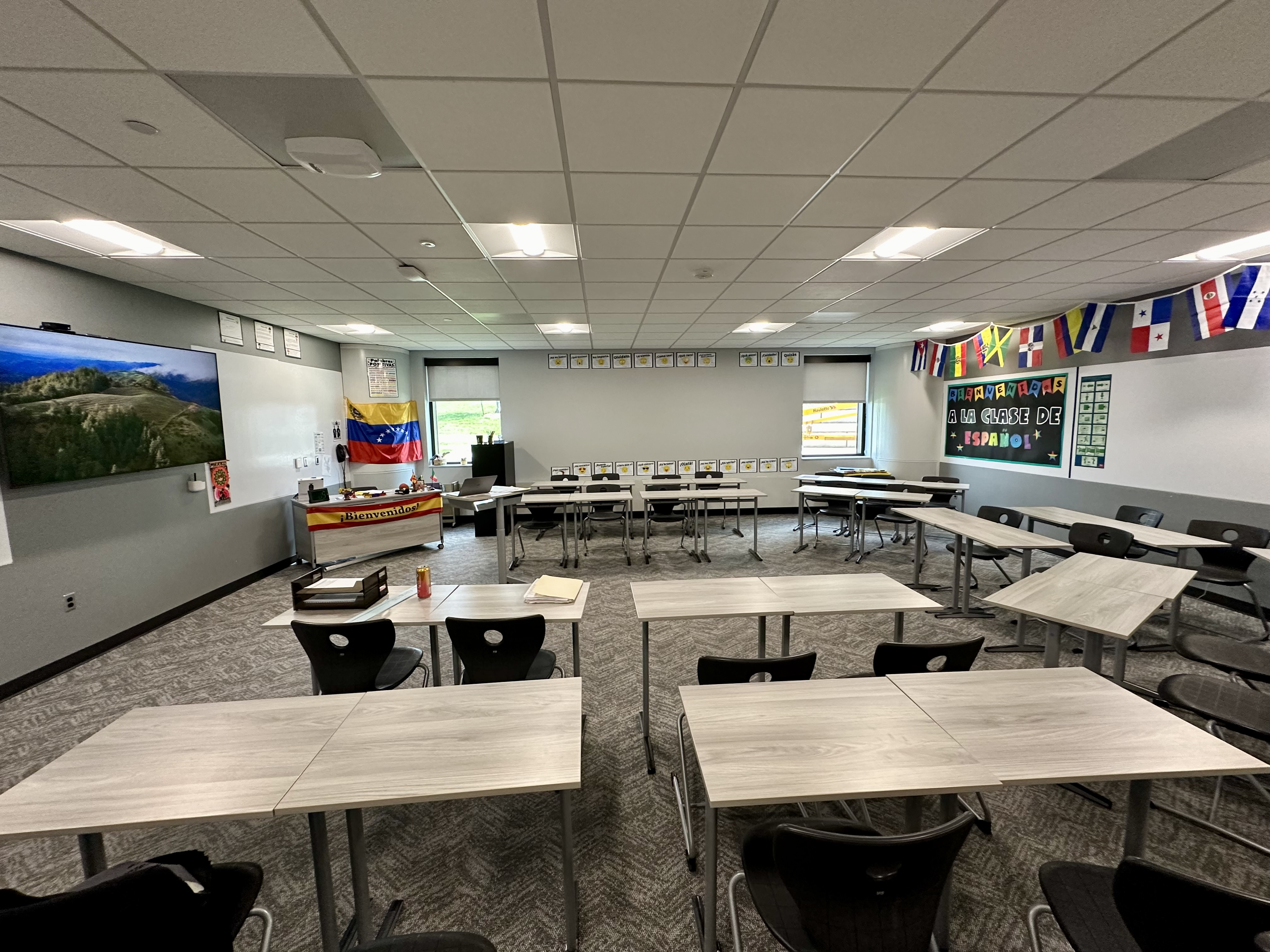
Mandan High School classroom for teaching English as a second language.

== Athletics ==
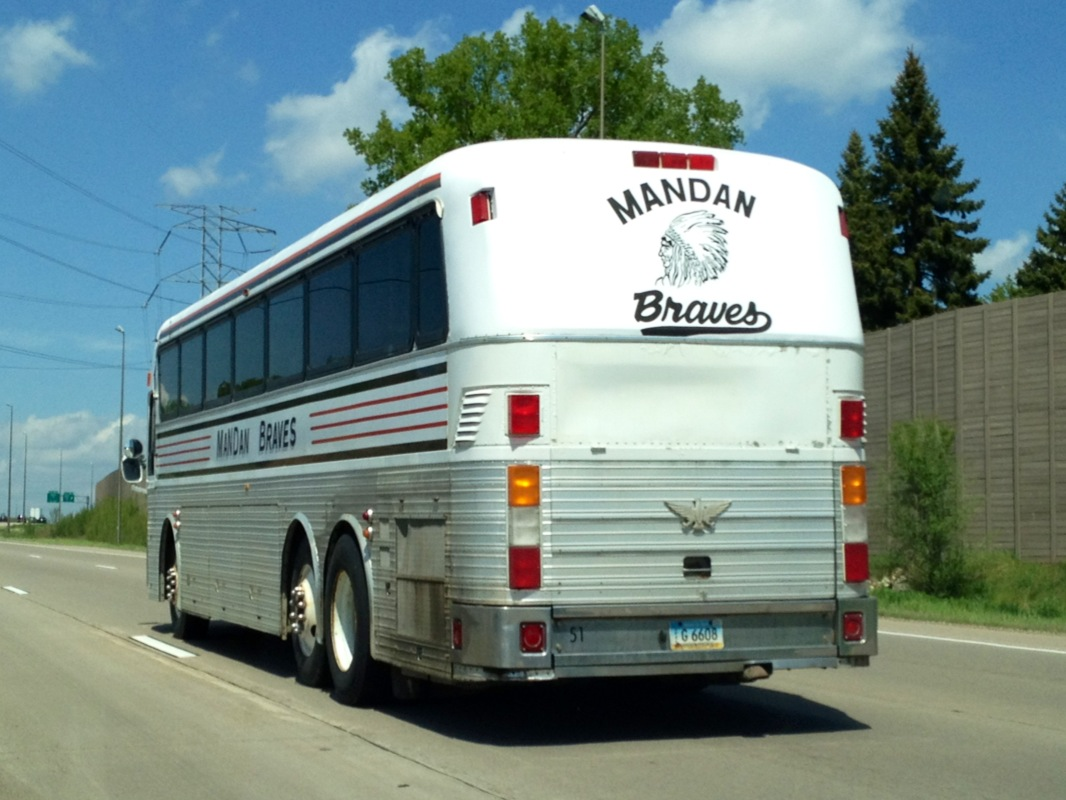
The Mandan Braves bus

=== Team information ===
The official school/team colors are black and white, although red has been adopted by some as an alternate or accent color. All of the athletic teams are named the Mandan Braves. Currently, the logo associated with the Braves is a side profile view headshot of a Native American wearing a headdress.

=== Championships ===
- State Class 'A' Boys' Cross Country: 1981, 1982, 1983
- State Class 'A' Boys' Basketball: 1940, 1966, 1967, 1981, 2009
- State Class 'A' Girls' Basketball: 1995, 1999, 2000, 2003, 2004, 2005, 2006, 2007, 2008
- State Class 'A' Football: 1939, 1942, 1947, 1948
- State Class 'A' Wrestling: 1977
- State Class 'A' Boys' Track and Field: 1984 co-champions
- State Class Girls' Track and Field: 1970
- State Class 'A' Girls' Track and Field: 1985, 2002
- State Class 'A' Baseball: 1994, 2010, 2015
- State Class 'A' Boys' Swimming and Diving:1995, 1997, 1998
- State Class 'A' Girls' Swimming and Diving: 1989, 1990, 1991, 1992, 1999, 2000, 2001, 2002
- State Class 'A' Speech: 2005, 2007, 2008, 2009, 2010

=== National championships ===
Mandan High School was awarded the 1983 National Cross Country Championship through the XC Legacy series published through Milesplit.us in an effort to begin filling in the national rankings from 1980–1988. The Harrier magazine, operated by Marc Bloom formerly of Runners World magazine, began keeping official rankings in 1989. On 1983: "Culminating a remarkable season Mandan capped it's [sic] 21st consecutive meet win streak with a State Championship".

== Notable alumni ==
- Ken Clouston (graduated 1988), member of the Wyoming House of Representatives
- Eric Schmidt (graduated 1997), college football coach

== See also ==
- Old Mandan High School: original building on the National Register of Historic Places
