= Sweet Briar School District =

School district in North Dakota, United States

Address
- 4060 County Road 83 Mandan, North Dakota, 58554; United States

District information
- Type: Public
- Grades: K–8
- NCES District ID: 3817940

Students and staff
- Students: 23
- Teachers: 2.0
- Staff: 0.07
- Student–teacher ratio: 11.5

Other information
- Website: www.sweetbriar17.com

Sweet Briar Public School District 17 is a school district headquartered in the Sweet Briar community, in unincorporated Morton County, North Dakota.

The district, which serves grades K-8, is entirely in Morton County. In 2018 Jack Dura of the Bismarck Tribune described the school as "a modern throwback to the many rural schoolhouses that once dotted North Dakota." In 2018 the district had a single teacher who also serves as principal. In 2019 the district had two teachers, and the principal/teacher, Sherilyn "Sheri" Johnson, announced she would retire. The district sends high school level students to Mandan High School in Mandan (of Mandan Public Schools) or New Salem-Almont High School in New Salem (of New Salem-Almont School District).

It is one of two schools that the Burleigh-Morton County Superintendent of Schools supervises, the other being the Little Heart School.

== History ==
The school was established around 1913. As a fire destroyed the first structure, the school district established another building opened made of yellow stucco that opened in 1936.

== Operations ==
Dura noted in 2018 that the school has an abundance of technological tools for students.

== Student body ==
In 2018 the district had 22 students in grades K-7 as there were no 8th graders at that time. In 2013 it had 13 students.
