= Stuart Dunlap House =

Historic house in North Dakota, United States

- U.S. National Register of Historic Places
- Location within North Dakota Location within the United States
- Location: 201 7th Ave., Mandan, North Dakota
- Coordinates: 46°49′34″N 100°54′2″W
- Area: less than one acre
- Built: 1904
- Built by: Nicilai A. Freeburg
- Architectural style: Queen Anne
- NRHP reference No.: 92000587
- Added to NRHP: June 8, 1992

The Stuart Dunlap House on 7th Ave. in Mandan, North Dakota was listed on the National Register of Historic Places in 1992.

== History ==
The residence and accompanying carriage house was built in 1904. It was designed and built by N. A. Freeburg (1862-1942), a Swedish born general contractor. Freeburg and his partner Charles Kidd built several of the prominent structures in the community including the First National Bank Building in the Mandan Commercial Historic District and the Freeburg - Esser Home.

The Stuart Dunlap house is associated with Hoy Sylvester Russell, founder of the Mandan Creamery and Produce Company. In 1923, Hoy Sylvester Russell (1886-1958) and his wife Cora Agnes (Walton) Russell (1888–1971) purchased the Stuart Dunlap home where they lived and raised their family. The Mandan Creamery and Produce Company commenced operation in 1915. Mandan Creamery and Produce Company as now known as the Cloverdale Foods Company.
