= Lewis and Clark Hotel =

Historic place in North Dakota, United States

- U.S. National Register of Historic Places
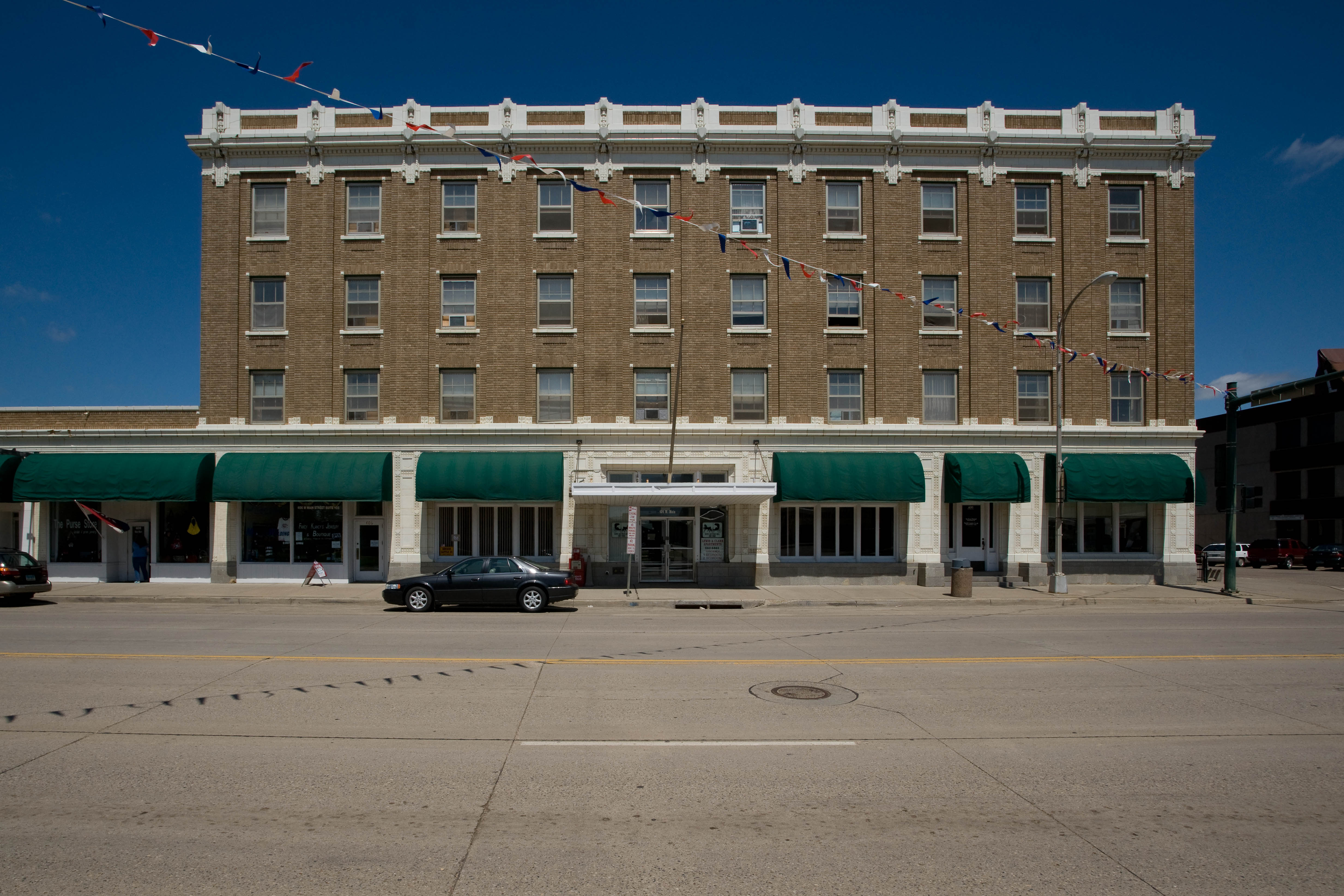

- Location within North Dakota Location within the United States
- Interactive map of Lewis and Clark Hotel
- Location: 404 W. Main St., Mandan, North Dakota
- Coordinates: 46°49′33″N 100°53′40″W
- Area: less than one acre
- Built: 1918
- Architect: Gage, William J.
- Architectural style: Late 19th and Early 20th Century American Movements
- NRHP reference No.: 83001938
- Added to NRHP: May 9, 1983

The Lewis and Clark Hotel in Mandan, North Dakota was built in 1918. It was listed on the National Register of Historic Places in 1983.

== History ==
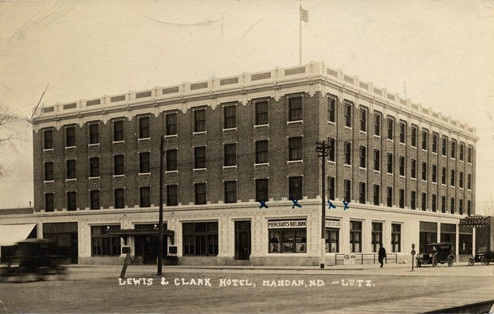
Lewis and Clark Hotel, circa 1919

The building was built by Louis B. Hanna (1861–1948) who served as Governor of North Dakota (1913–1917). In 1916, he purchased and razed the Inter-Ocean Hotel in downtown Mandan and drew up plans for a new hotel building. The building was designed by Fargo-based architect William J. Gage (1891-1965).

The four story high building is constructed of pressed brick, with white enamel ornamental trimmings. The structure was built as a 120-room hotel with commercial space. Hotel rooms occupy the second, third, and fourth floors of the building. Merchant's National Bank was located in the southeast corner of the building when the hotel first opened.
