= Jane Muskie =

First Lady of Maine

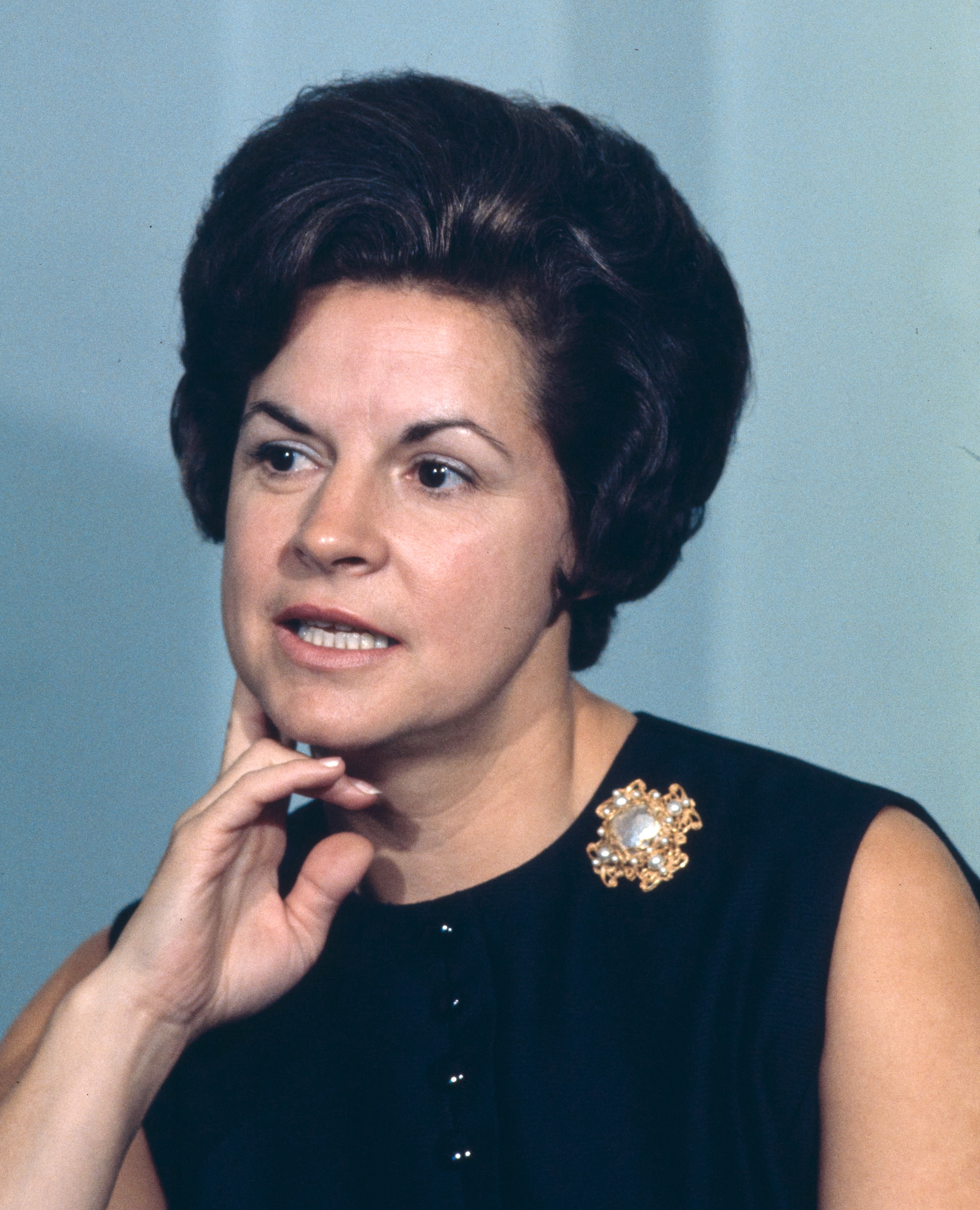
- Muskie in 1968

First Lady of Maine
- In role January 5, 1955 – January 2, 1959
- Governor: Edmund Muskie
- Preceded by: Olena Moulton Cross
- Succeeded by: Ellen Clauson

Personal details
- Born: Jane Frances Gray; February 12, 1927 Waterville, Maine, U.S.
- Died: December 25, 2004 (aged 77) Bethesda, Maryland, U.S.
- Resting place: Arlington National Cemetery
- Party: Democratic (prev. Republican)
- Spouse: Edmund Muskie (m. 1948; died 1996)
- Children: 5
- Education: Waterville High School

Jane Frances Muskie (née Gray; February 12, 1927 – December 25, 2004) was an American civic leader and writer who, as the wife of Edmund Muskie, served as First Lady of Maine from 1955 to 1959. She was an active campaigner for her husband, supporting his political career on both state and national levels while he served in the Maine House of Representatives, as Governor of Maine, as a United States senator, and as Secretary of State.

During the 1972 United States presidential election, content republished by William Loeb III in the Manchester Union Leader "depicted her smoking, drinking, cussing, and generally behaving in a way conservative New Hampshire voters might not think becoming". Her husband called Loeb a "gutless coward" in an emotional public display that ultimately lost him the 1972 Democratic presidential primary.

Inspired by her time in Washington, D.C., Muskie co-wrote a novel, with Abigail McCarthy, in 1986 about corruption and back-door politics titled One Woman Lost. After her husband's political career ended, they moved to Bethesda, Maryland. Muskie died there in 2004 due to complications from Alzheimer's disease and was buried, next to her husband, in Arlington National Cemetery.

== Biography ==
Muskie was born Jane Frances Gray on February 12, 1927, in Waterville, Maine, to Millage Guy Gray, a Canadian, and Myrtie May Jackson Gray, an American. She was raised in the Baptist faith. Her father died when she was ten years old, after which her mother supported the family. During the summers, she would travel to various resorts around Maine with her mother, who worked at them as a cook. Muskie's first job was as a dishwasher at one of the resorts. When she was fifteen years old she began working in a local dress shop.

Muskie was voted "prettiest in school" as student at Waterville High School. When she was eighteen years old, after graduating from high school, she was hired as a bookkeeper and saleswoman at an exclusive haute couture boutique in Waterville. While modelling a dress in the boutique window, a local lawyer and military officer, Lieutenant Edmund Muskie, came into the shop and invited her to attend a gala event with him. Soon after, she and Muskie began dating despite their difference in age stirring controversy in the town; she was nineteen and he was thirty-two. After dating for eighteen months, the two were married in a private ceremony in 1948. She converted to Catholicism and switched over her political affiliation from the Republican Party to the Democratic Party shortly before getting married. At the time of their marriage, her husband was serving in the Maine House of Representatives. They had five children: Stephen Muskie (born 1949), Ellen Muskie (born 1950), Melinda Muskie (born 1956), Martha Muskie (born 1958), and Edmund Muskie Jr. (born 1961). The Muskies lived in a yellow cottage at Kennebunk Beach while they lived in Maine.

Muskie assumed the role of First Lady of Maine upon her husband's inauguration as Governor of Maine in 1955. As first lady, she gave luncheons for three-hundred to four-hundred guests, as well as tea socials for wives of appointed officials, at The Blaine House. When the family moved to Washington, D.C. after her husband's election to the United States Senate, Muskie joined an exclusive group of senator's wives. In 1986, inspired by their time in Washington, Muskie and Abigail McCarthy co-wrote a novel about behind-the-scenes power struggles in American politics titled One Woman Lost. Muskie conducted most of the research used for the novel. She campaigned relentlessly for her husband throughout his political career in both state and federal politics. Her husband later served as United States Secretary of State under President Jimmy Carter.

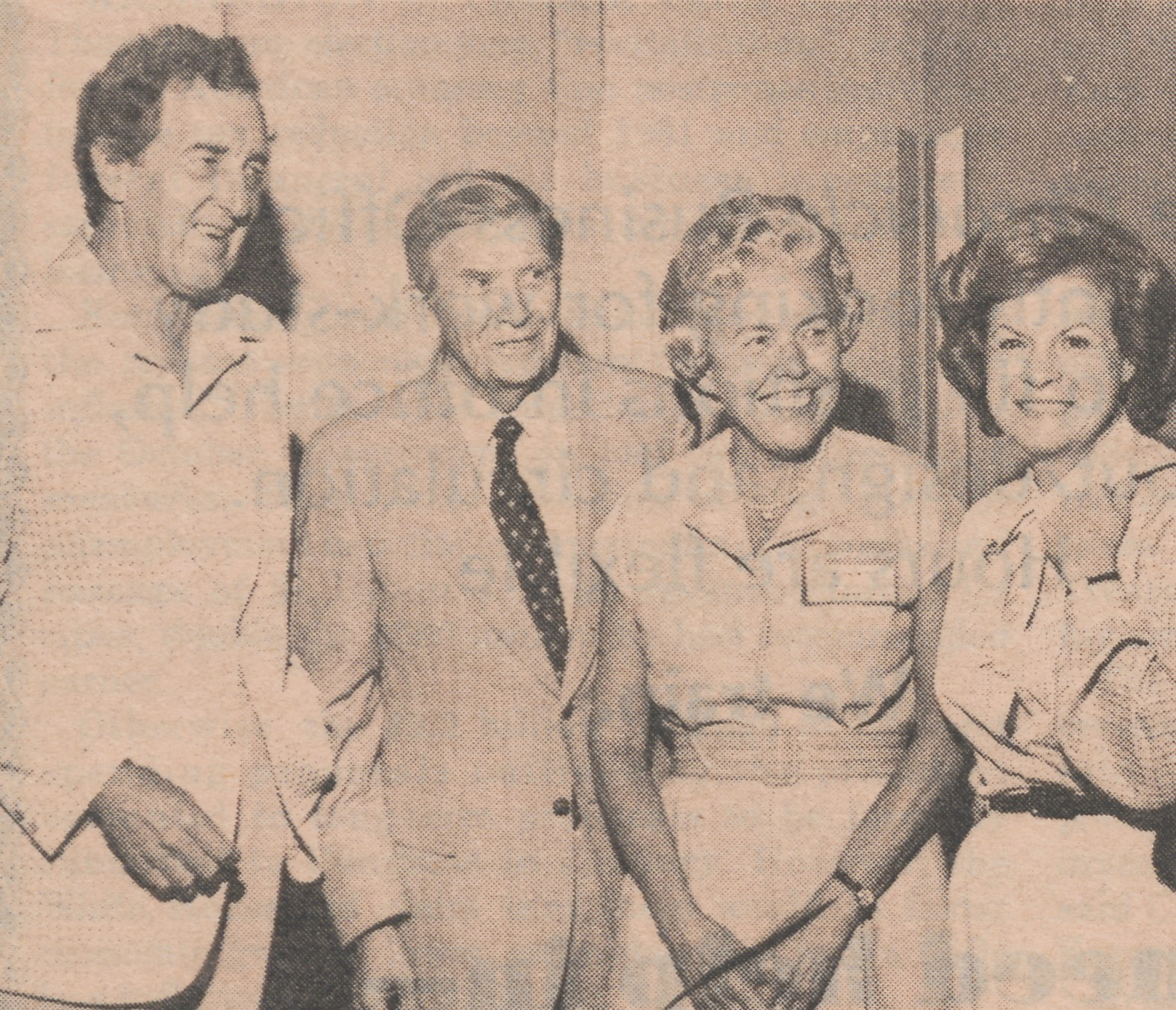
Edmund Muskie, Terry Sanford, Margaret Rose Sanford and Jane Muskie in 1980

When Muskie's husband ran for president in 1972, William Loeb III published the "Canuck letter" in the Manchester Union Leader; a letter reportedly forged by Donald Segretti and Ken W. Clawson that falsely accused Senator Muskie of being prejudiced against Americans of French-Canadian descent. Loeb also called into the question the character of Jane Muskie, accusing her of telling dirty jokes and smoking cigarettes, and using colorful language during his campaign, per an interview reprinted from the Wall Street Journal and Newsweek. During the interview, she had referred to liquor as "booze", called her husband "Big Daddy", and suggested telling "dirty jokes" to pass the time.

On February 26, 1972, Muskie's husband publicly rebuked Loeb, reportedly weeping while denouncing the attacks against her, stating "By attacking me and my wife, he [Loeb] has proved himself to be a gutless coward." The incident derailed Muskie's campaign for the Democratic presidential nomination, due to a supposed display of emotion which was seen unfit for a president at the time. Republicans used the incident to claim that Muskie was emotionally unstable and unfit to serve as president. In 1986, Muskie spoke about the incident with her husband to The New York Times stating, "Now it's quite acceptable for a man to show his emotions. President Reagan does it all the time."

She died at her home in Bethesda, Maryland, on December 25, 2004, due to complications related to Alzheimer's disease. She is buried next to her husband in Section 25 of Arlington National Cemetery in Arlington, Virginia.
