= Abigail McCarthy =

American politician

- Born: Abigail Quigley; April 16, 1915; Wabasha, Minnesota, U.S.
- Died: February 1, 2001 (aged 85); Washington, D.C., U.S.
- Education: St. Catherine University (BA); University of Minnesota (MA)
- Spouse: Eugene McCarthy (m. 1945; sep. 1969)
- Children: 5

Abigail Quigley McCarthy (April 16, 1915 – February 1, 2001) was an American academic and writer, and the wife of politician and presidential contender Eugene McCarthy. She predeceased her estranged husband by almost five years.

== Early life and education ==
Abigail Quigley was born in Wabasha, Minnesota, April 16, 1915. She graduated as a Phi Beta Kappa from the College of St. Catherine (now St. Catherine University) in St. Paul, Minnesota, in 1936. She received her M.A. from the University of Minnesota in 1942 and did postgraduate work at the University of Chicago and the Middlebury School of English.

== Career ==
McCarthy was a Catholic author, educator, and activist. She wrote several successful books and was a regular columnist for Commonweal, a liberal Catholic magazine, from 1974 to 1999. She wrote reviews for The New York Times and The Washington Post. She wrote a memoir titled "Private Faces, Public Places", first published in 1972. She founded and was first president of "Church Women United", a lay Catholic group. In 1986 she co-authored a novel titled One Woman Lost with Jane Muskie.

== Personal life ==
She met her future husband while working as a teacher in Mandan, North Dakota. They married on June 5, 1945, in St. Paul, Minnesota. Their first home was in Watkins, Minnesota, at an agriculture commune formed by Catholic couples. They later separated and lived apart, but never divorced.

They had five children: Christopher Joseph McCarthy (April 30, 1946 – April 30, 1946), Michael Benet McCarthy, Ellen McCarthy, Margaret Alice McCarthy, and Mary Abigail McCarthy (died July 28, 1990).

McCarthy died in Washington, D.C., on February 1, 2001, at her home on Connecticut Avenue. The Abigail Quigley McCarthy Center for Women was established at her alma mater, St. Catherine University, in her honor.
