= Almont, North Dakota =

- City
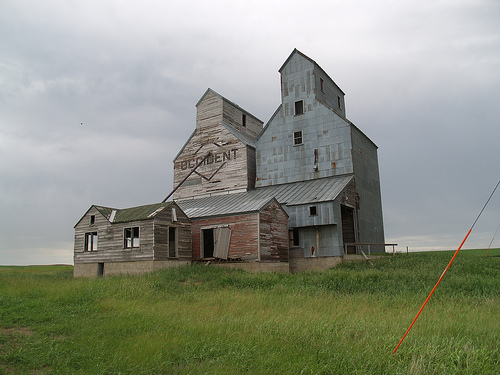
- An old grain elevator in Almont
- Interactive map of Almont, North Dakota
- Location within North Dakota
- Coordinates: 46.7283°N 101.5027°W
- Country: United States
- State: North Dakota
- County: Morton
- Founded: 1906
- Incorporated: 1936

Area
  - Total: 2.494 sq mi (6.460 km^{2})
  - Land: 2.494 sq mi (6.460 km^{2})
  - Water: 0 sq mi (0.000 km^{2}) 0.00%
- Elevation: 1,923 ft (586 m)

Population (2020)
  - Total: 100
  - Estimate (2025): 93
  - Density: 40/sq mi (15/km^{2})
- Time zone: UTC–6 (Central (CST))
  - Summer (DST): UTC–5 (CDT)
- ZIP Code: 58520
- Area code: 701
- FIPS code: 38-01700
- GNIS feature ID: 1035905

Almont is a city in Morton County, North Dakota, United States. It is part of the "Bismarck, ND Metropolitan Statistical Area" or "Bismarck–Mandan". The population was 100 as of the 2020 census, and was estimated at 93 in 2025.

== History ==
Almont was founded in 1906, incorporated in 1936, and reached a peak population of 232 in 1940. The Northern Pacific Railroad tracks were removed in 1947 when the mainline was rerouted, and the city has since withered to just above 100 residents.

== Geography ==
According to the United States Census Bureau, the city has a total area of 2.494 square miles (6.46 km^{2}), all land.

Almont is on County Road 86, about 10 miles (16 km) south of Interstate 94.

== Climate ==
This climatic region is typified by large seasonal temperature differences, with warm to hot (and often humid) summers and cold (sometimes severely cold) winters. According to the Köppen Climate Classification system, Almont has a humid continental climate, abbreviated "Dfb" on climate maps.

The Köppen Climate Classification subtype for this climate is "Dfb" (Humid Continental Climate).

Climate data for Almont, North Dakota, 1991–2020 normals, extremes 1984–2010
Month	Jan	Feb	Mar	Apr	May	Jun	Jul	Aug	Sep	Oct	Nov	Dec	Year
Record high °F (°C)	62 (17)	70 (21)	80 (27)	94 (34)	96 (36)	110 (43)	110 (43)	105 (41)	102 (39)	96 (36)	83 (28)	66 (19)	110 (43)
Mean maximum °F (°C)	49.9 (9.9)	53.0 (11.7)	67.7 (19.8)	82.4 (28.0)	87.6 (30.9)	92.7 (33.7)	98.3 (36.8)	97.4 (36.3)	91.6 (33.1)	83.1 (28.4)	65.3 (18.5)	51.6 (10.9)	101.3 (38.5)
Mean daily maximum °F (°C)	25.1 (−3.8)	29.5 (−1.4)	42.3 (5.7)	57.3 (14.1)	69.0 (20.6)	77.7 (25.4)	84.9 (29.4)	83.9 (28.8)	71.4 (21.9)	57.6 (14.2)	41.5 (5.3)	28.8 (−1.8)	55.7 (13.2)
Daily mean °F (°C)	14.0 (−10.0)	18.3 (−7.6)	30.4 (−0.9)	43.2 (6.2)	55.1 (12.8)	64.5 (18.1)	70.5 (21.4)	68.8 (20.4)	59.3 (15.2)	44.7 (7.1)	30.0 (−1.1)	18.0 (−7.8)	43.1 (6.1)
Mean daily minimum °F (°C)	2.9 (−16.2)	7.1 (−13.8)	18.5 (−7.5)	29.1 (−1.6)	41.3 (5.2)	51.4 (10.8)	56.2 (13.4)	53.7 (12.1)	44.5 (6.9)	31.7 (−0.2)	18.4 (−7.6)	7.3 (−13.7)	30.2 (−1.0)
Mean minimum °F (°C)	−24.5 (−31.4)	−20.7 (−29.3)	−7.9 (−22.2)	9.8 (−12.3)	24.5 (−4.2)	37.5 (3.1)	42.6 (5.9)	38.0 (3.3)	26.0 (−3.3)	11.2 (−11.6)	−4.2 (−20.1)	−19.5 (−28.6)	−31.1 (−35.1)
Record low °F (°C)	−47 (−44)	−45 (−43)	−30 (−34)	−8 (−22)	9 (−13)	28 (−2)	39 (4)	22 (−6)	15 (−9)	−9 (−23)	−26 (−32)	−50 (−46)	−50 (−46)
Average precipitation inches (mm)	0.31 (7.9)	0.38 (9.7)	0.71 (18)	1.49 (38)	2.35 (60)	3.34 (85)	2.65 (67)	2.01 (51)	1.38 (35)	1.20 (30)	0.60 (15)	0.45 (11)	16.87 (427.6)
Average snowfall inches (cm)	5.5 (14)	4.0 (10)	4.1 (10)	1.0 (2.5)	0.0 (0.0)	0.0 (0.0)	0.0 (0.0)	0.0 (0.0)	0.0 (0.0)	0.2 (0.51)	5.7 (14)	5.7 (14)	26.2 (65.01)
Average precipitation days (≥ 0.01 in)	4.5	3.9	4.9	5.8	8.4	9.7	7.8	6.5	5.4	4.3	4.1	4.4	69.7
Average snowy days (≥ 0.1 in)	2.9	2.5	2.4	0.3	0.0	0.0	0.0	0.0	0.0	0.1	2.0	2.9	13.1
Source: NOAA (precip/precip days 1981–2010)(mean maxima/minima, snow/snow days 1985–2009)

== Demographics ==
Historical population
Census	Pop.	Note	%±
1940	232		—
1950	190		−18.1%
1960	190		0.0%
1970	109		−42.6%
1980	146		33.9%
1990	117		−19.9%
2000	89		−23.9%
2010	122		37.1%
2020	100		−18.0%
2025 (est.)	93		−7.0%
U.S. Decennial Census; 2020 Census

=== 2020 census ===
As of the 2020 census, there were 100 people, 47 households, and 36 families residing in the city.

=== 2010 census ===
As of the 2010 census, there were 122 people, 51 households, and 30 families residing in the city. The population density was 46.2 inhabitants per square mile (17.8/km^{2}). There were 66 housing units at an average density of 25.0 per square mile (9.7/km^{2}). The racial makeup of the city was 100.0% White.

There were 51 households, of which 29.4% had children under the age of 18 living with them, 52.9% were married couples living together, 3.9% had a female householder with no husband present, 2.0% had a male householder with no wife present, and 41.2% were non-families. 37.3% of all households were made up of individuals, and 27.4% had someone living alone who was 65 years of age or older. The average household size was 2.39 and the average family size was 3.23.

The median age in the city was 41.8 years. 27.9% of residents were under the age of 18; 6.5% were between the ages of 18 and 24; 18.8% were from 25 to 44; 32.8% were from 45 to 64; and 13.9% were 65 years of age or older. The gender makeup of the city was 49.2% male and 50.8% female.

=== 2000 census ===
As of the 2000 census, there were 89 people, 43 households, and 22 families residing in the city. The population density was 33.8 inhabitants per square mile (13.1/km^{2}). There were 63 housing units at an average density of 23.9 per square mile (9.2/km^{2}). The racial makeup of the city was 100.0% White.

There were 43 households, out of which 25.6% had children under the age of 18 living with them, 44.2% were married couples living together, 4.7% had a female householder with no husband present, and 48.8% were non-families. 44.2% of all households were made up of individuals, and 23.3% had someone living alone who was 65 years of age or older. The average household size was 2.07 and the average family size was 3.00.

In the city, the population was spread out, with 24.7% under the age of 18, 5.6% from 18 to 24, 28.1% from 25 to 44, 23.6% from 45 to 64, and 18.0% who were 65 years of age or older. The median age was 40 years. For every 100 females, there were 81.6 males. For every 100 females age 18 and over, there were 86.1 males.

The median income for a household in the city was $25,625, and the median income for a family was $30,625. Males had a median income of $24,375 versus $15,000 for females. The per capita income for the city was $13,761. There were no families and 6.4% of the population living below the poverty line, including no under eighteens and 38.9% of those over 64.

== Education ==
Almont is in the New Salem-Almont School District. It was previously in Sims School District 8, which operated Almont Elementary School. At the time the district sent high school students to New Salem schools. The district merged with New Salem schools in 2008. In fall 2008, the North Dakota Department of Public Instruction labeled Almont Elementary "nonoperating".
