= Stutsman County Courthouse and Sheriff's Residence/Jail =

- U.S. National Register of Historic Places
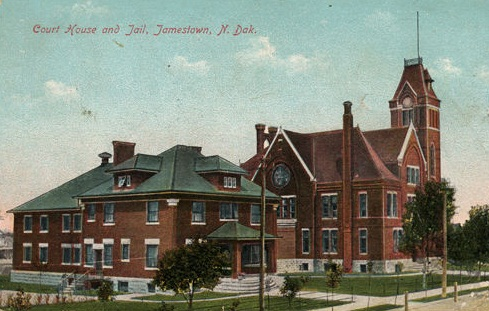
- Stutsman County Courthouse and Jail, c. 1913

- Location within North Dakota Location within the United States
- Location: 504 3rd Ave., SE, Jamestown, North Dakota
- Coordinates: 46°54′13″N 98°42′20″W
- Area: 2.8 acres (1.1 ha)
- Built: 1883
- Architect: Koch, Henry C.; Horton, Gilbert R.
- Architectural style: Gothic Revival architecture
- MPS: North Dakota County Courthouses TR
- NRHP reference No.: 76001356
- Added to NRHP: September 8, 1976

The Stutsman County Courthouse and Sheriff's Residence/Jail in Jamestown, North Dakota was built in 1883. It was listed on the National Register of Historic Places in 1976.

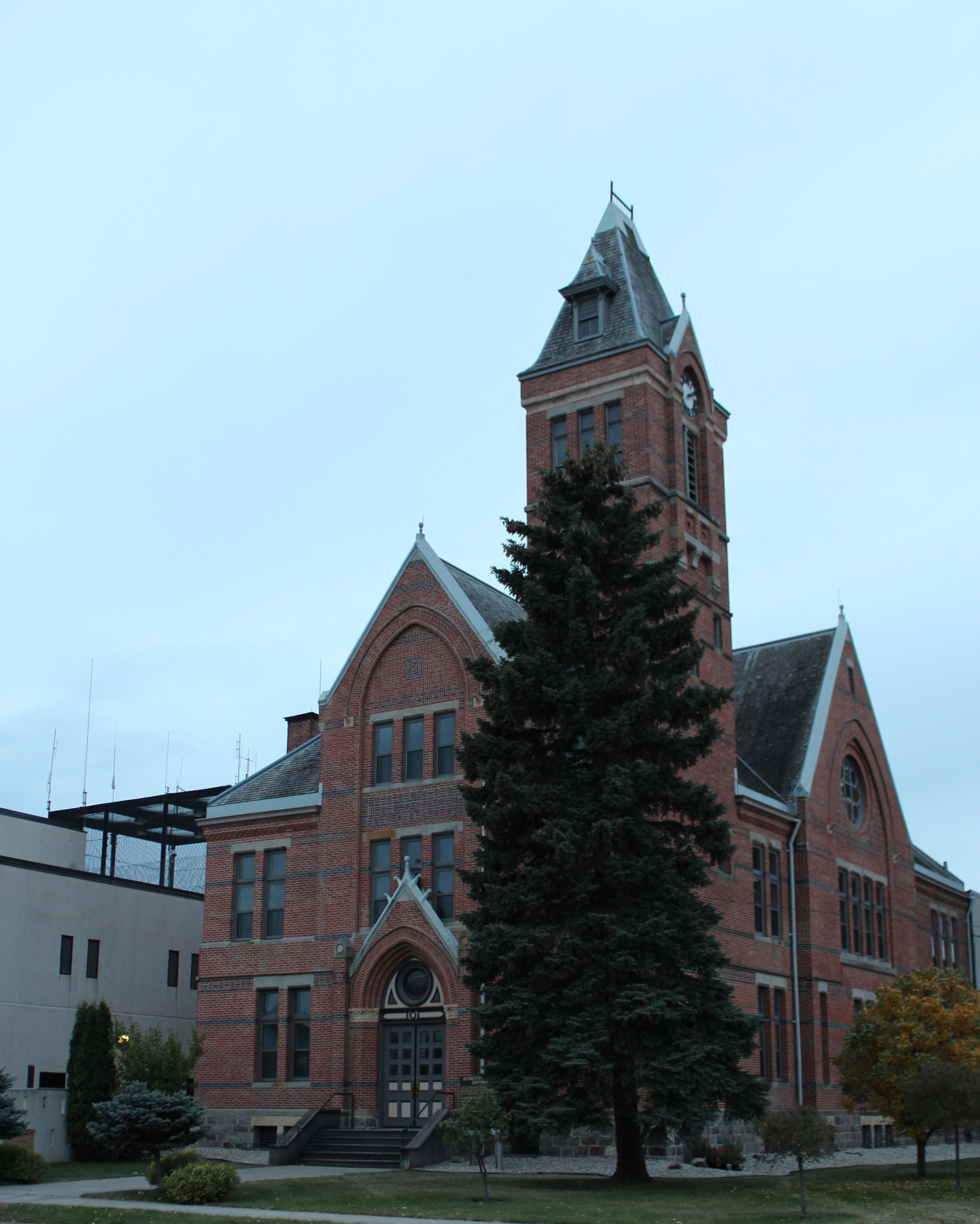
Courthouse in 2012

It was designed by architect Henry C. Koch.

The west wing of the building was added in 1926, and was designed by architect Gilbert R. Horton.

Its NRHP listing was consistent with a later statewide study of North Dakota courthouses.

The building was used as the courthouse for Stutsman County until the 1980s, when it was replaced by a newer building. Though plans called for the original building's destruction, ownership instead transferred to the State Historical Society of North Dakota, who is working to restore the courthouse and has listed the building as Stutsman County Courthouse State Historic Site.
