= Harmon, North Dakota =

- CDP & Unincorporated community
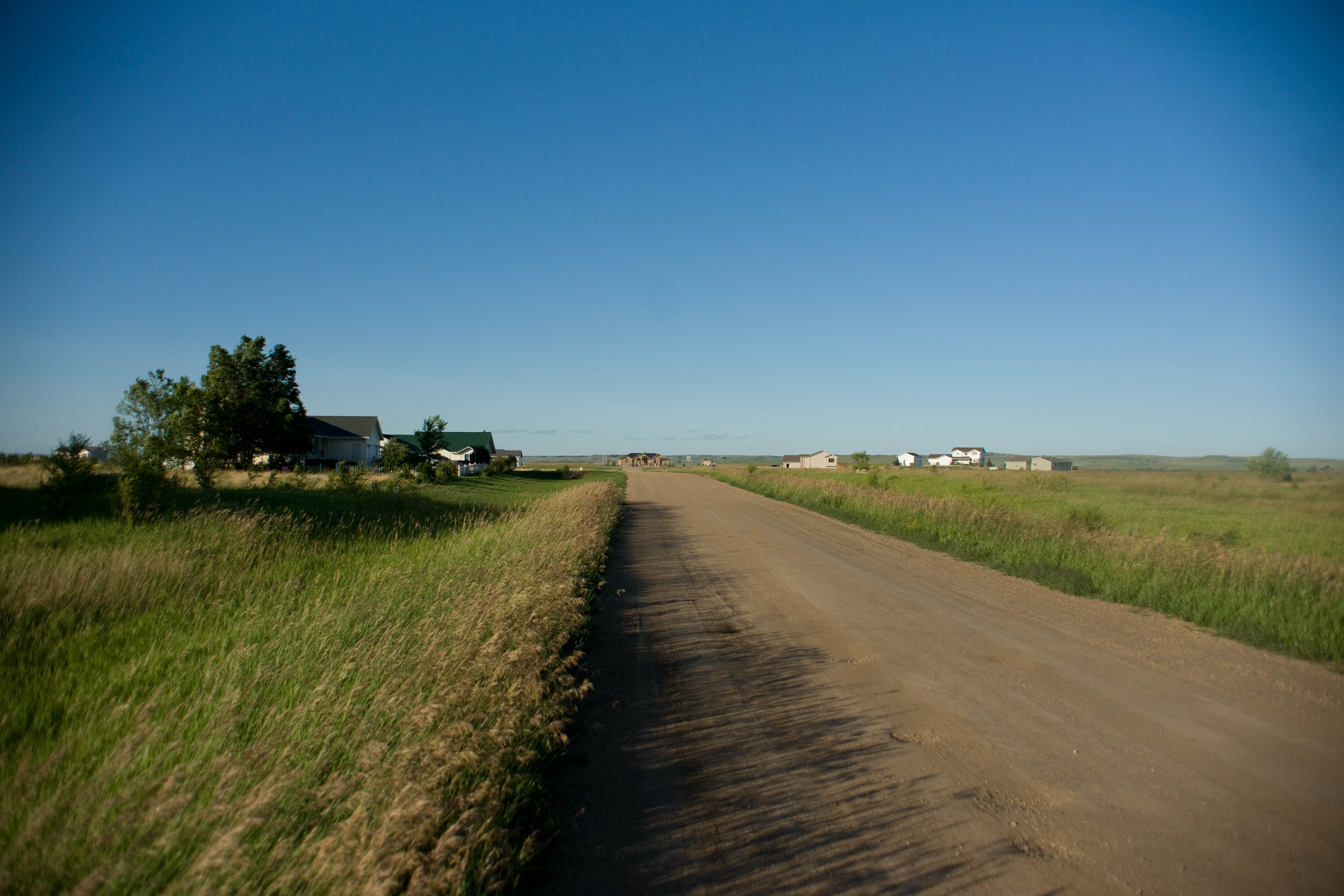
- Street in Harmon (July 2009)
- Interactive map of Harmon, North Dakota
- Location within North Dakota
- Coordinates: 46.9544°N 100.9570°W
- Country: United States
- State: North Dakota
- County: Morton
- Platted and sited: July 23, 1913
- Founded by: Willis T. McConnell
- Named after: George and H.H. Harmon

Area
  - Total: 1.567 sq mi (4.059 km^{2})
  - Land: 1.567 sq mi (4.059 km^{2})
  - Water: 0 sq mi (0.000 km^{2}) 0.00%
- Elevation: 1,709 ft (521 m)

Population (2020)
  - Total: 259
  - Estimate (2025): 199
  - Density: 165/sq mi (63.8/km^{2})
- Time zone: UTC–6 (Central (CST))
  - Summer (DST): UTC–5 (CDT)
- ZIP Code: 58554
- Area code: 701
- FIPS code: 38-35500
- GNIS feature ID: 2584345
- Highways: CR 140, ND 1806

Harmon is a census-designated place (CDP) and unincorporated community in Morton County, North Dakota, United States. The population was 259 as of the 2020 census, and was estimated at 199 in 2025. It is 9.5 miles (15.3 km) north of Mandan.

== History ==
Harmon was platted and sited on July 23, 1913, by Willis T. McConnell and named for two bachelor brothers, George and H.H. Harmon. The town went into decline during the Depression in the 1930s and virtually disappeared. The original cemetery is still in use. On January 15, 1951, two Northern Pacific freight trains collided outside of town. The town has repopulated in the 20th century.

== Geography ==
Harmon is east of North Dakota Highway 1806, 9.5 miles (15 km) north of Mandan. The original townsite is along the western edge of the Missouri River floodplain, with current development sited in the western part of the CDP, above the river bluffs. Harmon Lake Recreation Area is on the west side of Highway 1806, on a reservoir built on Otter Creek, a tributary of the Missouri.

According to the United States Census Bureau, the CDP has a total area of 1.567 square miles (4.06 km^{2}), all land.

== Demographics ==
Historical population
Census	Pop.	Note	%±
2010	145		—
2020	259		78.6%
2025 (est.)	199		−23.2%
U.S. Decennial Census; 2020 Census

As of the 2024 American Community Survey, there were 68 estimated households in Harmon with an average of 2.91 persons per household. The CDP has a median household income of $113,500. Approximately 0.0% of the CDP's population lives at or below the poverty line. Harmon has an estimated 81.5% employment rate, with 33.6% of the population holding a bachelor's degree or higher and 100.0% holding a high school diploma. There were 68 housing units at an average density of 43.40 per square mile (16.8/km^{2}).

The top five reported languages (people were allowed to report up to two languages, thus the figures will generally add to more than 100%) were English (100.0%), Spanish (0.0%), Indo-European (0.0%), Asian and Pacific Islander (0.0%), and Other (0.0%).

The median age in the CDP was 33.3 years.

Harmon, North Dakota – racial and ethnic composition Note: the US Census treats Hispanic/Latino as an ethnic category. This table excludes Latinos from the racial categories and assigns them to a separate category. Hispanics/Latinos may be of any race.
Race / ethnicity (NH = non-Hispanic)	Pop. 2010	Pop. 2020	% 2010	% 2020
White alone (NH)	144	241	99.31%	93.05%
Black or African American alone (NH)	0	0	0.00%	0.00%
Native American or Alaska Native alone (NH)	1	3	0.69%	1.16%
Asian alone (NH)	0	3	0.00%	1.16%
Pacific Islander alone (NH)	0	0	0.00%	0.00%
Other race alone (NH)	0	0	0.00%	0.00%
Mixed race or multiracial (NH)	0	4	0.00%	1.54%
Hispanic or Latino (any race)	0	8	0.00%	3.09%
Total	145	259	100.00%	100.00%

=== 2020 census ===
As of the 2020 census, there were 259 people, 75 households, and 66 families residing in the CDP. The population density was 165.28 inhabitants per square mile (63.81/km^{2}). There were 83 housing units at an average density of 52.97 per square mile (20.45/km^{2}). The racial makeup of the CDP was 93.05% White, 0.00% African American, 1.16% Native American, 1.16% Asian, 0.00% Pacific Islander, 2.70% from some other races and 1.93% from two or more races. Hispanic or Latino people of any race were 3.09% of the population.

=== 2010 census ===
As of the 2010 census, there were 145 people, 48 households, and 39 families residing in the CDP. The population density was 92.53 inhabitants per square mile (35.73/km^{2}). There were 49 housing units at an average density of 31.27 per square mile (12.07/km^{2}). The racial makeup of the CDP was 99.31% White and 0.69% Native American.

== Education ==
The Mandan Public School District 1 (also known as Morton County District #1) was formally organized on April 23, 1881. Reorganization in 1969.

The area is served by the Mandan Public School District 1. It operates the Mandan School. In the 2025-26 academic year, the district reported a total of 4,452 students.
