= Jamestown Historic District (Jamestown, North Dakota) =

Historic district in North Dakota, United States

- U.S. National Register of Historic Places
- U.S. Historic district
- Location within North Dakota Location within the United States
- Location: Roughly bounded by First St., Fourth Ave., SE, Fifth St., and Second Ave., Jamestown, North Dakota
- Coordinates: 46°54′20″N 98°42′23″W
- Area: 43.1 acres (17.4 ha)
- Architect: Hancock Bros., Henry C. Koch
- Architectural style: Chicago, Commercial, Italianate
- MPS: Jamestown MPS
- NRHP reference No.: 88000987
- Added to NRHP: September 8, 1989

The Jamestown Historic District in Jamestown, North Dakota, is a 43.1-acre (17.4 ha) historic district that was listed on the National Register of Historic Places (NRHP) in 1989. It includes works designed by the Hancock Brothers and by Gilbert Horton. It includes Chicago style architecture, Italianate architecture, Early Commercial architecture, and other architecture. The listing included 104 contributing buildings.

According to its NRHP nomination, the district "is a significant collection of properties that represents the patterns of activity which gave the town its prominence in southeast North Dakota. The town's focal role in the shipping of agricultural produce, in the distribution of consumer goods, and as the governmental center for the local area is represented by district properties. The nomination of properties in a district has been selected as an efficient registration strategy and because sufficient integrity has preserved the architectural-historical-spatial unity among the properties."
