= Mandan Public Schools =

School district in North Dakota, USA

Mandan Public School District 1, also called Mandan Public Schools, is a school district headquartered in Mandan, North Dakota.

Located in Morton County, it serves Mandan and Harmon. The district takes high school students from the Sweet Briar School District.

== History ==
In 1974 the district sold $90,000 of bonds so it could build a vocational center at its secondary facility. In 1981 the district was considering adding an expansion of its elementary school. That year the district's board of education decided not to sell interest bids and opted to have a new set of bids opened.

In 1981 the North Dakota Supreme Court was deliberating whether the district and the New Salem School District could receive funds from coal impact money from the state, with the definition of a "tipple" being a determining factor.

== Schools ==
Secondary schools

- Mandan High School (Braves)
- Mandan Middle School

Elementary schools

- Custer (Cougars) (closing after 2025-26 school year)
- Fort Lincoln (Thunderbirds)
- Lewis and Clark (Trailblazers)
- Red Trail (Rangers)
- Roosevelt
- Mary Stark (Shooting Stars)
- Lakewood (Lynx) (new for 2023-24 school year)

Alternative schools

- B. C. Academy (9-12)
- Mandan Virtual Academy
