= Huff Hills =

Ski area in North Dakota, United States

Coordinates: 46°37′37″N 100°43′24″W

Huff Hills Ski Area is a ski resort located sixteen miles south of Mandan, North Dakota. It was established in 1993 on the former site of the defunct Twilight Hills ski area, which operated during the 1960s.

== Description ==
- 21 runs
- 425 ft. vertical
- 3 lifts - 2 double chairlifts, handle tow
- Snowmaking
- Ski and snowboard ready and

== Lifts ==
Huff Hills began operation with a chairlift acquired from Buffalo, New York's Holimont ski resort and a t-bar lift. Two years later, the resort purchased a Hall 1405 chairlift that had been the first chair used at Brian Head Ski Resort in southwestern Utah.
