= Old Waterville High School =

- Waterville High School
- U.S. National Register of Historic Places
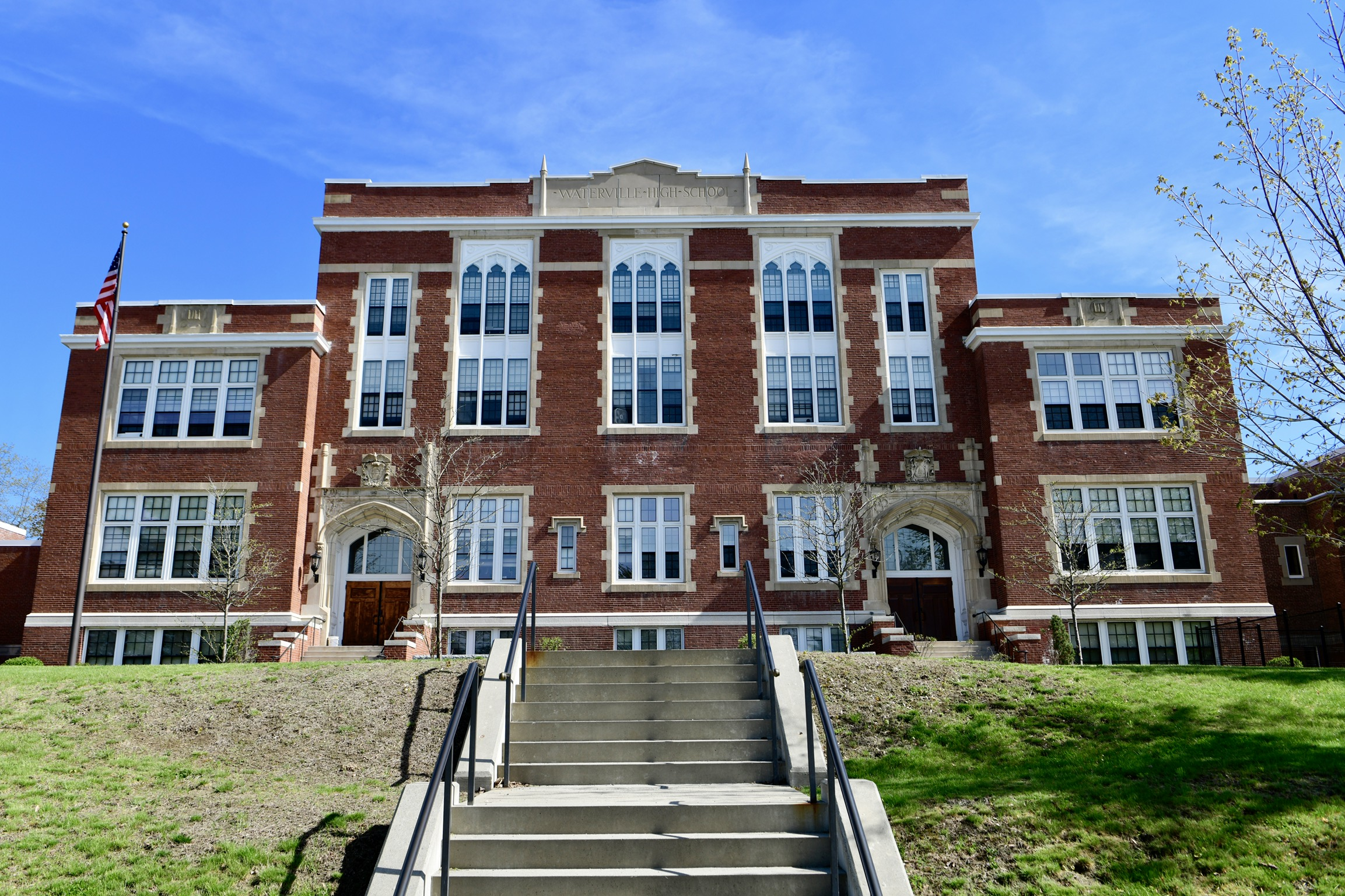

- Location within Maine Location within the United States
- Location: 21 Gilman St. Waterville, Maine
- Coordinates: 44°33′13″N 69°38′14″W
- Area: 2.46 acres (1.00 ha)
- Built: 1911
- Architect: Freeman, Funk & Wilcox
- Architectural style: Collegiate Gothic; Art Deco
- NRHP reference No.: 10000807
- Added to NRHP: September 30, 2010

The Old Waterville High School, also known historically as the Gilman Street School, is a former school building at 21 Gilman Street in Waterville, Maine. Opened in 1912 and enlarged in the 1930s with Works Progress Administration funding, it is locally distinctive for its Collegiate Gothic and Art Deco architecture, and for its importance to the city's education system. The building, now converted to residences, was listed on the National Register of Historic Places in 2010.

== Description and history ==
The Old Waterville High School stands on the north side of Gilman Street, between Burleigh and West Streets, in a residential area just west of the city's downtown. The school consists of three major sections, consisting of its original main section and two flanking wings. The central block is a three-story masonry structure, built out of brick with cast stone trim. It has a raised basement, and a pair of entrances set in Gothic arched openings. Its center bays project, and its upper-floor windows are grouped in tall panels, accentuating the building's height. To the west stands the 1936 training wing, which has a more streamlined design with echoes of the original, and to the east stands the 1938-39 gymnasium and auditorium wing, which is more ornate than the first wing but less so than the original block. Both wings are built using similar materials to the original block.

The main block was built in 1909-13 to a design by Freeman, Funk & Wilcox, an architectural firm based in Brookline, Massachusetts, and is one of its few known examples of educational architecture. The Collegiate Gothic style they chose is also uncommon in Maine, and typically appears only on college campuses. The wings were both designed by the Augusta firm of Bunker & Savage, specialists in educational architecture. Funding for the additions was provided by the federal Works Progress Administration. It was the city's second high school (and first after incorporation as a city), the first having been opened in 1876. It served as the city's high school until 1964, and then as its junior high school. The junior high was moved to new facilities in the 1970s, after which the building housed administrative offices and other education-related uses. It has since been redeveloped to primarily house low-income residents.

== Notable alumni ==
- Jane Muskie (1927–2004), First Lady of Maine

== See also ==
- National Register of Historic Places listings in Kennebec County, Maine
