= Mandan Commercial Historic District =

Historic district in North Dakota, United States

- U.S. National Register of Historic Places
- U.S. Historic district
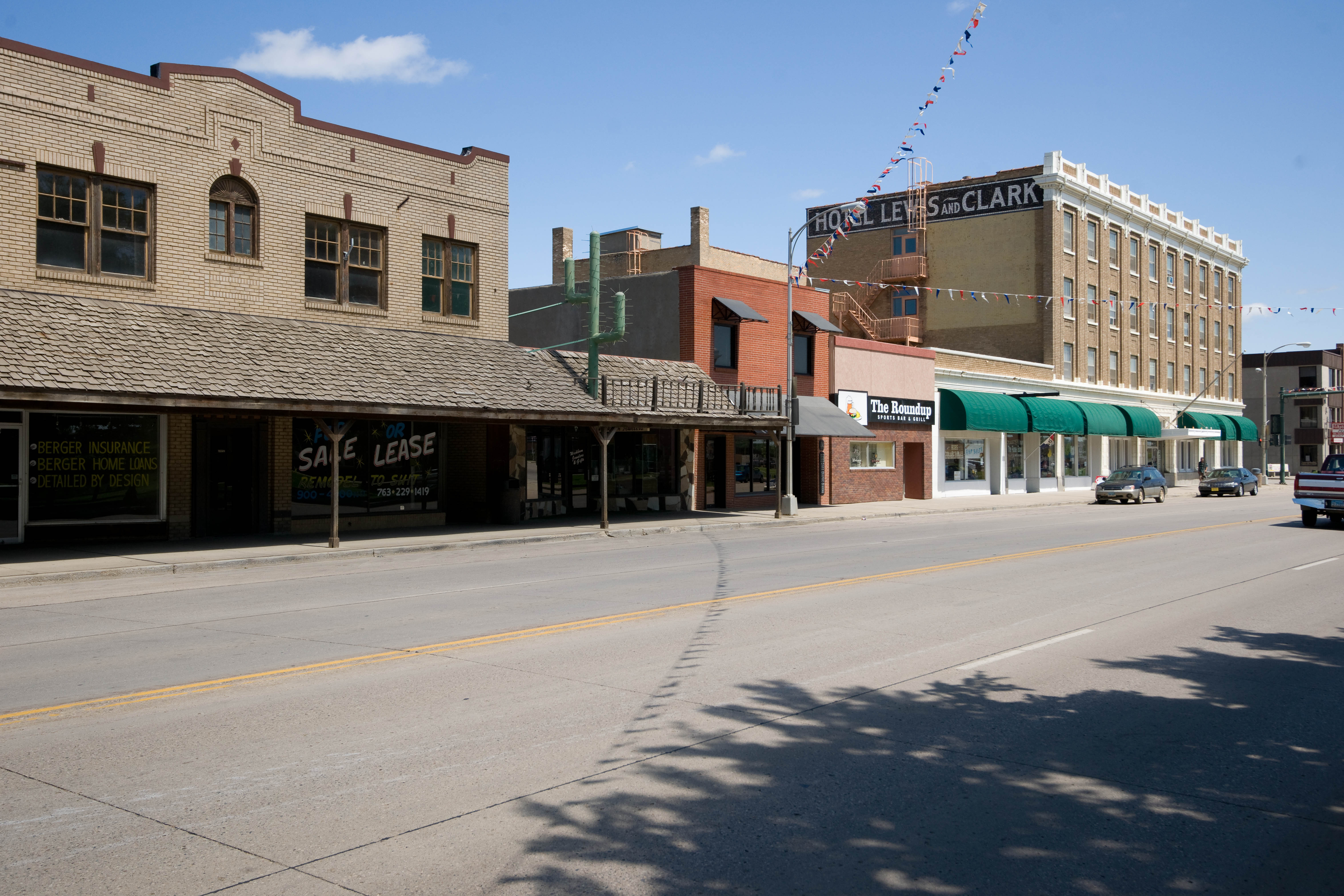
- 400 Block of W. Main Street; Lewis and Clark Hotel at right

- Location within North Dakota Location within the United States
- Location: Roughly bounded by Main and 1st Sts. between 1st Ave., NE and 4th Ave., NW, Mandan, North Dakota
- Coordinates: 46.82673°N 100.89132°W
- Area: 20 acres (8.1 ha)
- Built: 1884
- Architect: Multiple
- Architectural style: Late 19th and 20th Century Revivals, Late Victorian, Modern Movement
- NRHP reference No.: 85000341
- Added to NRHP: February 21, 1985

Mandan Commercial Historic District is a 20-acre (8.1 ha) historic district in Mandan, North Dakota that has work dating to 1884. It was listed on the National Register of Historic Places (NRHP) in 1985. The listing includes 35 contributing buildings and a contributing object.

It includes the Sullivanesque Lewis and Clark Hotel built in 1917, which is separately NRHP-listed.

Mandan was a major hub of the Northern Pacific Railway; it became headquarters of NP's Missouri Division in 1916.

== See also ==
- National Register of Historic Places listings in Morton County, North Dakota
