= New Salem-Almont School District =

School district in North Dakota, USA

Address
- 310 Elm Avenue New Salem, North Dakota, 58563; United States

District information
- Type: Public
- Grades: PreK–12
- NCES District ID: 3800392

Students and staff
- Students: 346
- Teachers: 33.88
- Staff: 30.41
- Student–teacher ratio: 10.21

Other information
- Website: www.new-salem.k12.nd.us

New Salem-Almont Public School District 49 is a school district headquartered in New Salem, North Dakota. It includes two schools in New Salem: Prairie View Elementary School and New Salem-Almont High School.

It serves New Salem and Almont in Morton County. It also serves sections of Grant County and Oliver County. It takes high school students from the Sweet Briar School District.

== History ==
The current eight-classroom elementary school opened circa 1963, and the current 17-classroom secondary school, built for $400,000, opened in 1963.

The New Salem district ordered the Judson School, which had 18 students, closed in 1976. The per-student cost in 1976 was $1,400, which was higher than the school district average of $952. Officials of the North Dakota Department of Public Instruction argued that the school was in a bad facility condition and should not continue to operate. By 1976 William Heisler, the Morton County superintendent of schools, was to determine whether the Judson School should reopen.

In 1981 the North Dakota Supreme Court was deliberating whether the district and the Mandan School District could receive funds from coal impact money from the state, with the definition of a "tipple" being a determining factor.

The New Salem district had 399 students in 1999.

By 2005 the Sims School District of Almont sent high school students to New Salem, as the Sims district was now elementary only. In 2008 the Sims district merged into New Salem, and its remaining elementary school closed; in Fall 2008 the North Dakota Department of Public Instruction listed Almont Elementary as being "nonoperating".

In 2017 the high school principal, Michael Gilbertson, applied to be on Bismarck Public Schools's school board.

The district had a school bond vote scheduled for October 1, 2019 as the district wanted to expand the elementary school, including having a special education unit in six new rooms.

== Schools ==
- New Salem-Almont High School
- Prairie View Elementary School (Holsteins)
  - In 1999 the school had 184 students.
