= Dunlap's Dining Room =

Historic restaurant in Sacramento, California, US

- U.S. National Register of Historic Places
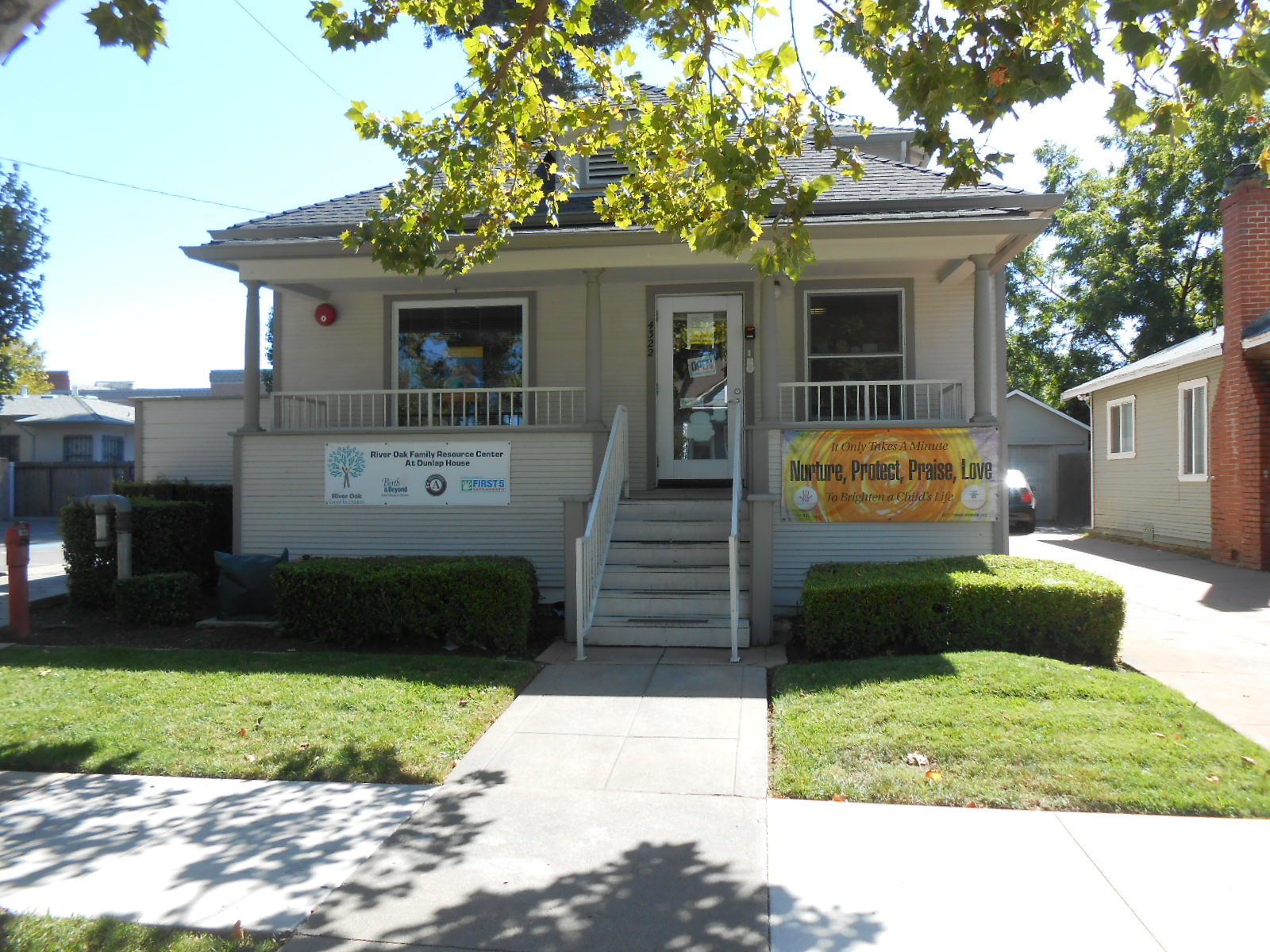

- Location within Sacramento, California Location within California Location within the United States
- Location: 4322 Fourth Ave., Sacramento, California
- Coordinates: 38°32′53.1″N 121°27′22.4″W
- Area: less than one acre
- Built: 1906
- Architectural style: Colonial Revival, Bungalow/craftsman
- NRHP reference No.: 92000308
- Added to NRHP: April 2, 1992

Dunlap's Dining Room was a restaurant operated out of the residence of black entrepreneur George T. Dunlap in Sacramento, California. The business was popular in its time and building is now listed on the National Register of Historic Places.

== History ==
Dunlap built his home in 1906 as a small, 4-room, pink-colored bungalow in the Oak Park neighborhood of Sacramento. As his family grew, he would build additions to the home. Opening the home's dining room as a restaurant in 1930, the business continued until his retirement in 1968.

During its run, the restaurant never offered a printed menu. Instead, patrons were able to choose from three entree options: fried chicken, baked ham, and T-bone steak. Despite its quaint approach, the establishment hosted such visitors as Frank Merriam, Earl Warren, and C.K. McClatchy.

Dunlap's Dining Room was included in The Negro Motorist Green Book, a travel guide for African-Americans listing places that would not refuse them service.

== Renovations ==
In 1997, George Dunlap's daughter, Audrey Dunlap Wilcox, donated the home, now featuring 2,000 square feet (190 m^{2}), to the Sacramento Children's Home with the request that it be used to help the families in Oak Park. In 2001, the home had a major renovation project costing $300,000 and turning the home into a family resource center for the county.

The project included a new foundation for the house while keeping the original hardwood flooring. A fresh coat of pink paint was applied to maintain the original color of Dunlap's Dining Room.
