= Sims School District 8 =

Defunct school district in North Dakota, US

Sims Public School District 8 was a school district in North Dakota. It operated one school, Almont School, in Almont. By 2005, the district sent high school students to New Salem schools. In the school's last year, 2007–2008, it was a K-8 school.

The district had territory in both Morton County and Grant County.

Its territory is now within the New Salem-Almont School District.

== History ==
The Almont School was first constructed in 1917. In 1928, it received an addition.

Circa 1959, John M. Page became superintendent; he served until fall 1967. Jerry Stenejhem was to become the superintendent of the district at that time; he was already principal of the school. That year he planned to enact a "Head Start" program. Around that time the facilities were expanded with more classrooms, a gymnasium, and a new office for the superintendent due to an increase of students.

In 1962, it received another addition, and in 1967 the structure underwent a renovation.

In 1970, voters voted to increase their taxes to 80.4 mills. Within Almont itself the vote was 75-5 and outside of Almont, in unincorporated areas, it was 102–51, leading to a total 76% affirmative vote, 177–56.

In December 1978, the district still had high school classes. By then enrollment was down to 71 in grades K-12, a 18% decrease from the number of students in the 1977–1978 school year, and its enrollment was still declining. At the time the high school did not have industrial arts courses.

In May 1988, the last class of seniors graduated from Almont High School. In the fall of 1989 high school students were bussed to New Salem High School, the Almont School serving kindergarten through eighth grade.

In 1994, a section of the school was condemned after the North Dakota Department of Public Instruction and two structural engineers highlighted problems with the building, so individuals and entities donated over $19,000 to have a portable classroom built. The school used 50 volunteers to construct it.

By 2005, Almont Elementary adopted a four-day school week instead of a five-day school week, making it the only elementary school with such a schedule at the time. The fact that it did not need to consider athletics schedules, as it was at that point an elementary school only, made it easier to enact a four-day school week.

The district merged with New Salem schools in 2008. In Fall 2008, the North Dakota Department of Public Instruction listed Almont Elementary as being "nonoperating".
