= Adam Dunlap Farmstead =

Historic site in Wisconsin, United States

- U.S. National Register of Historic Places
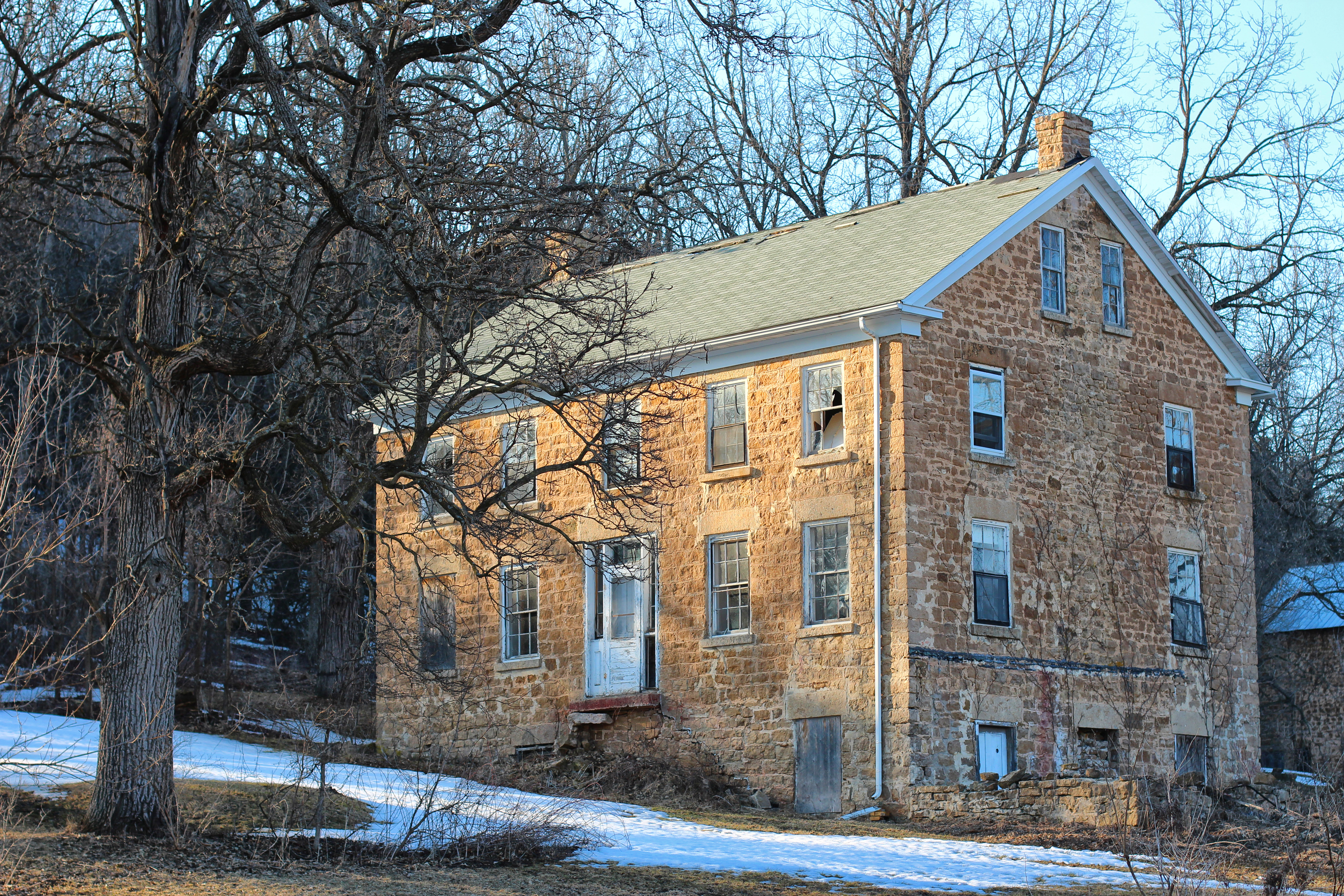
- Part of the farmstead.
- Location: 9646 Dunlap Hollow Rd., Mazomanie (town), Wisconsin
- Coordinates: 43°12′28″N 89°43′53″W
- Area: 5 acres (2.0 ha)
- Architectural style: Greek Revival
- NRHP reference No.: 01001242
- Added to NRHP: November 15, 2001

The Adam Dunlap Farmstead, built by a Yankee settler family, was one of the first farms in the Town of Mazomanie, Wisconsin. A number of the original structures, built around 1849 from stone quarried on the farm, are still intact. The farmstead was added to the State and the National Register of Historic Places in 2003, for being a relatively intact homestead of a progressive Yankee pioneer settler, and for the Greek Revival style of the stone farmhouse.

== History ==
Settlers began to arrive in what would become the Town of Mazomanie in 1844, only twelve years after a key battle of the Black Hawk War was fought three miles northeast of this farm. In 1846 Adam Dunlap and his family started carving out their farm on the east side of a hill overlooking a marsh along what is now called Dunlap Creek marsh. At that time, only two dozen families lived in Roxbury township, which then included both modern Mazomanie and Roxbury.

The Dunlaps were Yankees from central New York state, of Scotch descent. With 32-year-old Adam came his wife Harriet, one or two infant children, and his parents John and Nancy. At first they lived in a log cabin, but after a few years Adam hired a stonemason from Honey Creek to build more substantial buildings, and most of them still stand.

The large stone house, built around 1849, is 3.5 stories counting the basement story which is exposed from the hillside. Its walls are built from stone blocks quarried on the farm. At ground level the walls are 2.5 feet thick, tapering to 2 feet at the roof line. Characteristic Greek Revival features are the moderately-pitched roof, the frieze board and cornice returns, the symmetrically placed windows, and the transom and sidelights around the front door.

Other stone farm buildings were built about 1849 too. The surviving barn is 34 by 40.5 feet, with stone walls 24 feet tall on the sides and a steel roof, with stalls for about 21 dairy cows in the first story, and with a hay mow and grain bins above. Next to that barn are the ruins of a larger 80 by 24 foot stone barn built about the same time, which burned in 1929. The taller section of a stone ice house or spring house was also built around 1849, 14 by 16 feet; the lower section was probably added between 1890 and 1900. This building contains a pipe which delivered spring water, probably to cool milk, butter and cheese. The foundation of the corn crib was also probably laid around 1848, though the upper wooden cage has been rebuilt since.

The farm's first main cash crop was wheat. Wheat was valuable at the time and grew well on the newly-broken ground. The early settlers hoped that the Wisconsin River, just a few miles away, would one day provide easy transport to distant markets. The shallow, shifting sandbars of the Wisconsin never really allowed that, but in 1856 the Milwaukee and Mississippi Railroad began to stop in Mazomanie, five miles away. Flour mills and creameries soon opened there, creating a convenient market.

Adam was industrious and his farm grew rapidly. By 1860 he harvested more wheat than any other farm in Roxbury and Mazomanie. The agricultural censuses of 1850, 1860 and 1870 show the early farm growing and changing as he tried various crops and types of cattle:

	1850	1860	1870
Acres	120	240	250
Farm Cash Value	$100	$3,000	$10,000
Value of Implements	$60	$195	$1,000
Value of Stock	$225	$985	$950
Horses & Oxen	4	6	4
Milk Cows	6	8	7
Butter produced (pounds)	700	800	
Cheese produced (pounds)	100		
Other Cattle	5	25	17
Sheep	24	100	100
Swine	0	15	6
Wheat (bushels)	460	300	840
Corn (bushels)	100	1,000	450
Oats (bushels)	125	200	800
Barley (bushels)	0	200	0

Adam and Harriet eventually had ten children, of which six survived infancy. Harriet died in 1883. Son John and his family lived with Adam for several years until John died in 1888. Then son Ervin and his family lived with Adam and operated the farm until Adam died in 1901. Ervin's son Guy and his family took over in 1909, operating the farm until the 1960s. His daughter Dorothy Dunlap Szudy owned the farm until 1997. After she died, her husband Leonard owned it, with her son Lenny and his family living in the house. The Dunlaps have a private cemetery near the house, where Adam and Harriet, Adam's parents, Dorothy, and other relatives are buried.

== Recent Renovation (2021–2024) ==
Beginning around 2021 or 2022, a private individual undertook a comprehensive renovation of the main stone farmhouse, which had fallen into disuse. The project consisted of both the interior and exterior of the structure, and by ~ 2024 the home had been restored to a fully livable house with modern amenities.

Despite the contemporary interior updates, care was taken to preserve several of the farmhouse's original historic features. The exterior stone walls, quarried on the farm around 1849, remain intact and visible. Inside on the first floor, an original structural ceiling wood beam was retained as an exposed architectural element. Also preserved in the first floor is a tree stump, believed to date to the original clearing of the land during the farm's founding in the mid-nineteenth century, which remains embedded in the floor as a rare surviving artifact of the homestead's earliest history. A front porch was also built, as well as a back patio. Additionally, a new three car garage was also built next to the home.

The renovation seems to have not extend to the outbuildings, including the surviving stone barn, ice house, and corn crib, which likely remain in their existing states. The farmhouse is now currently occupied as a private residence, and no longer seems to be left "abandoned".
