= Gilbert Horton =

Gilbert Horton was a free-born African American who was captured with the intent of being sold into slavery. Horton had worked on a ship known as The Macedonian after his father had worked for years to purchase his freedom. When The Macedonian docked in Norfolk, Virginia, Horton traveled to Georgetown in Washington D.C., where he was arrested on the assumption that he was a runaway slave.

== Background ==
In August 1826, a local business owner in Croton Falls, New York, named John Owen noticed an advertisement in The National Intelligencer describing Horton. Owen brought this to the attention of William Jay, who was the son of John Jay, in order to express concern over the capture of a free citizen.

== Relief from capture ==
Through the efforts of Jay and Owen, Governor DeWitt Clinton wrote a letter on behalf of Horton's freedom, to then President John Quincy Adams.

The work of Governor Clinton and Senator Henry Clay ultimately secured Horton's release.
