= Mandan, North Dakota =

Morton County Seat

- City
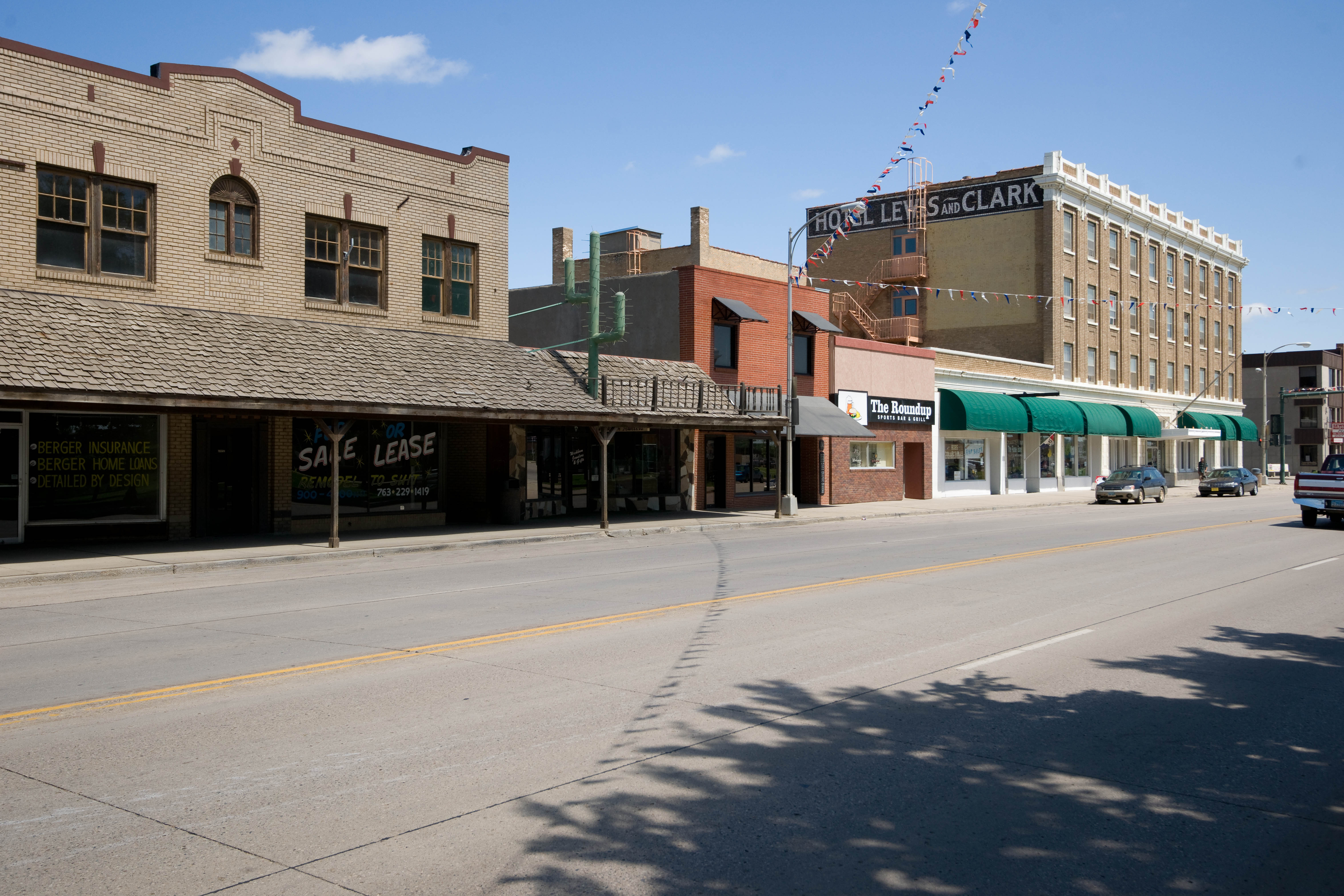
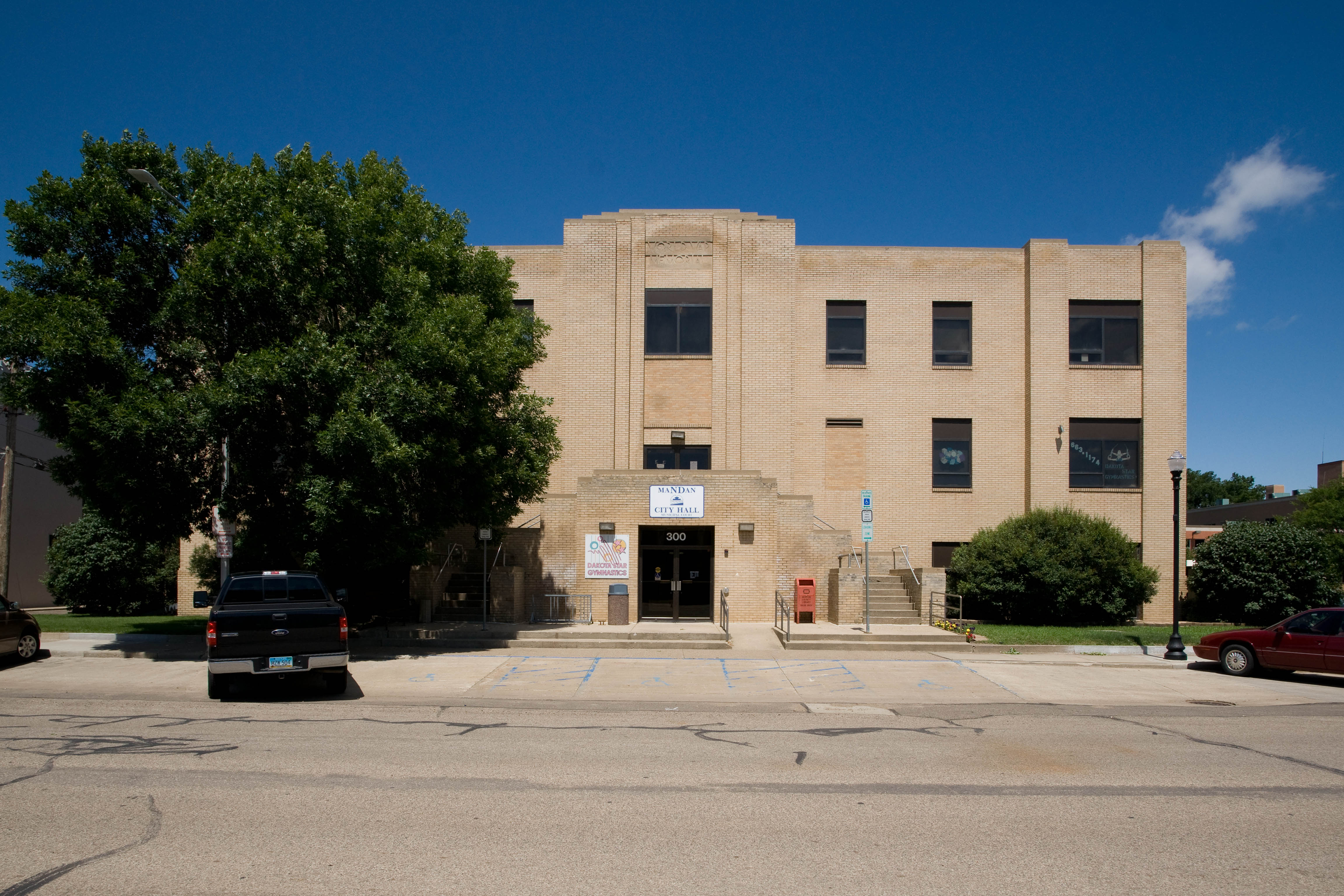
- Downtown Mandan, 2009 Mandan City Hall

- Logo
- Motto: Where the West Begins
- Interactive map of Mandan, North Dakota
- Location within North Dakota
- Coordinates: 46.8295°N 100.8871°W
- Country: United States
- State: North Dakota
- County: Morton
- Metro: Bismarck–Mandan
- Founded: 1879
- Incorporated (village): February 24, 1881
- Incorporated (city): March 1883

Government
  - Mayor: James Froelich
  - Commissioner: Heidi Belohlavek; Mike Braun; Ryan Heinsohn; Craig Sjoberg
  - U.S. Representative: Julie Fedorchak (R)

Area
  - City: 13.665 sq mi (35.392 km^{2})
  - Land: 13.517 sq mi (35.009 km^{2})
  - Water: 0.148 sq mi (0.384 km^{2}) 1.08%
  - Urban: 41.9 sq mi (108.4 km^{2})
  - Metro: 4,281 sq mi (11,088 km^{2})
- Elevation: 1,647 ft (502 m)

Population (2020)
  - City: 24,206
  - Estimate (2025): 25,061
  - Density: 1,790.8/sq mi (691.42/km^{2})
  - Urban: 98,198 (US: 316th)
  - Urban density: 2,346.2/sq mi (905.89/km^{2})
  - Metro: 139,750 (US: 303rd)
  - Metro density: 33/sq mi (12.6/km^{2})
- Time zone: UTC–6 (Central (CST))
  - Summer (DST): UTC–5 (CDT)
- ZIP Code: 58554
- Area code: 701
- FIPS code: 38-49900
- GNIS feature ID: 1036146
- Highways: I-94, I-94 Bus., I-194, ND 6, ND 1806
- Website: cityofmandan.com

Mandan is a city on the eastern border of Morton County, North Dakota, United States. Founded in 1879 on the west side of the upper Missouri River, it was designated in 1881 as the county seat of Morton County. The population was 24,206 as of the 2020 census, and was estimated at 25,061 in 2025, making it the eighth-most populous city in North Dakota. Across the Missouri River from Bismarck. Mandan is a core city of the Bismarck metropolitan area.

== History ==
=== Naming ===
The city was named after the historic indigenous Mandan of the area. The Mandan are now part of the Three Affiliated Tribes of the Fort Berthold Reservation, spanning the upper Missouri River in the western part of the state. Their people also live in cities of the state and other areas. In the 2010 census, nearly 5% of the people in Mandan identified as Native American.

The Mandan Indian village at the southern base of Crying Hill prominent in east Mandan was recorded as early as 1738 and called Good Fur Robe, after their chief. The settlement was also recorded as Crying Hill and Two Face Stone, after their corresponding geographic features. It was one of six Mandan villages on the west riverbank between the Knife and Cannonball Rivers.

The credit for the city's incorporated name is a point of debate. John Andrew Rea arrived across the river in Bismarck in 1876 to serve as temporary editor of its newspaper during one of its founder's extended absences. Rea subsequently served as the register in the governmental land office in the territorial capital of Bismarck for eight years starting in June 1880. Rea claimed he and Northern Pacific Railroad engineer Thomas L. Rosser created the name. He wrote to the St. Paul Pioneer Press, which published and popularized the name that remains in use today. But the more generally accepted story credits the city's name to Frederic Gerard. Gerard had married Helena Catherine, an Arikara/Ree woman when he ran the Fort Berthold trading post. Gerard was appointed by the Dakota Territorial governor as Morton County's first assessor when it was established in March 1878. He was one of the first three men elected as a Morton County Commissioner in November 1878.

=== Early history ===
While Native Americans had long established settlements in the area along the river, the first white explorer was Frenchman Sieure de la Verendyre, whose expedition arrived in 1738. Not until the early 1800s did Euro-American frontiersmen come to the area with any regularity, the Lewis and Clark Expedition in 1804 and 1806, George Catlin in 1832, and Prince Maximilian and Karl Bodmer in 1834 being the most notable. In 1830 the American Fur Company established the Fort Clark Trading Post 40 miles upstream on the Missouri River to support trappers. To provide protection for the approaching rail line from the east and the homesteaders who would surely follow, the US Army established two outposts in the area in 1872 and 1873. Fort Greeley (later renamed Fort Hancock) was founded first on the river's east side. On the west side, an infantry post, Fort McKeen, was constructed on bluffs above the confluence of Heart and Missouri Rivers. In 1873 Congress authorized the addition of a cavalry post and changed its designation to Fort Abraham Lincoln when foot soldiers were deemed ineffective against their mounted adversaries.

When the Northern Pacific Railroad announced a pending river crossing in 1872, land speculators rushed to establish claims at probable locations for the inevitable city to be established on the west side of the crossing. The Lincoln Townsite Company claimed the "even" section 28 of land adjacent to the west border of the "odd" section 27 of land claimed by the railroad and platted in March 1879 as "Mandan Proper." Investors moved quickly within contacts in the Territorial Legislature and Governor's office to have "Lincoln" designated as Morton County Seat. However, no significant development would occur there for decades.

But construction of the bridge across the Missouri River was postponed. While the 1873 financial panic is most frequently cited for the delay, difficulties with maintaining track integrity in west Minnesota delayed governmental acceptance of those segments of line and the corresponding award of federal subsidies.

In 1877, a group of Bismarck based investors established the townsite of Sturgis approximately 1.5 miles south of Fort Lincoln along the Bismarck to Deadwood stagecoach road. The village was named after Lt. John Sturgis who died with Lt. Colonel George Custer the prior year in the Battle of the Greasy Grass (i.e., The Battle of the Little Big Horn) and was the son of Major Samuel Sturgis who was at the time commander of Fort Meade near Deadwood. The name would be recycled in 1878 to denote a city further south in what eventually became South Dakota, reportedly named after Samuel Sturgis

Once its final location was announced, about five miles north of Fort Abraham Lincoln, a work camp appeared on the west riverbank in December 1878, complete with its own post office. The settlement also served as the construction staging area for men and materials for the westward expansion of the rail line.

On March 3, 1879, the post office was moved from the west bank of the Missouri River to the railroad's city site within blocks of Mandan's first railroad depot and freight building at Main Street and Stark Avenue (today's Collins Avenue) once the City provided an appropriate building. Four city names coincided exactly with four postmasters. The original railroad work camp's post office in 1878 was known as Morton. The name Mandan stuck for only eight days in March 1879 before being renamed Cushman by a postmaster with that surname. In September 1879, the post office returned to its designation of Mandan.

The City of Mandan was formally incorporated on February 24, 1881, and was named for the Mantani Indians, or "people of the bank." Mandan became the county seat for the replatted Morton County after the North Dakota legislature restored the prior county boundaries in 1881 after Burleigh County's land grab in 1879. The city of Lincoln had been county seat from 1878 to 1879.

Upon completion of the railroad to Montana in 1881, Fort Abraham Lincoln had fulfilled its primary purpose and gradually declined until it was deactivated in 1892 formally abandoned in 1893. The site was later transferred to the ND State Parks and Recreation Department and today is operated as Fort Abraham Lincoln State Park.

=== Transportation development ===
In the earliest days of Euro-American settlement, the main commercial transportation route was the Missouri River. Even after the rail arrived in the 1870s, the river remained the main north–south route until the mid-1930s' development of the national highway system. Steamboats used coal for fuel and the mine at Sims seven miles west of Mandan was a major source of lignite coal. If unavailable, steamboat crews bought wood from farmers along the river. Bellows Landing, the site of today's R M Hesket Power Station, was a refueling station with an icehouse. Historical records indicate it served steamboat traffic as early as 1832 when the riverboat Yellowstone reached Fort Union. Regular steamboat service on the Missouri began in 1860. Bellows Landing was renamed Rock Haven when the US government took over the operation in the late 1870s. The Army Corps of Engineers made extensive riverside improvements, including adding dry-dock and boat repair facilities. It supported the supply ships for the US Army's frontier forts and was considered the best landing on the river. Unlike most river harbors, the area was permanent and safe even during spring river ice breakup. It ceased operations in 1934.

=== Recent history ===
In 2013, Mandan was selected a finalist in the Rand McNally "Most Patriotic City" competition.

As part of the Bismarck-Mandan MSA, the area has repeatedly been ranked in the top 5 on both the Forbes list of "Best Small Places for Business and Careers" and the Milken Institutes' "Best Small Cities" list. The sister cities have also been included in CNN Money's list of the top 100 places to live.

== Geography ==
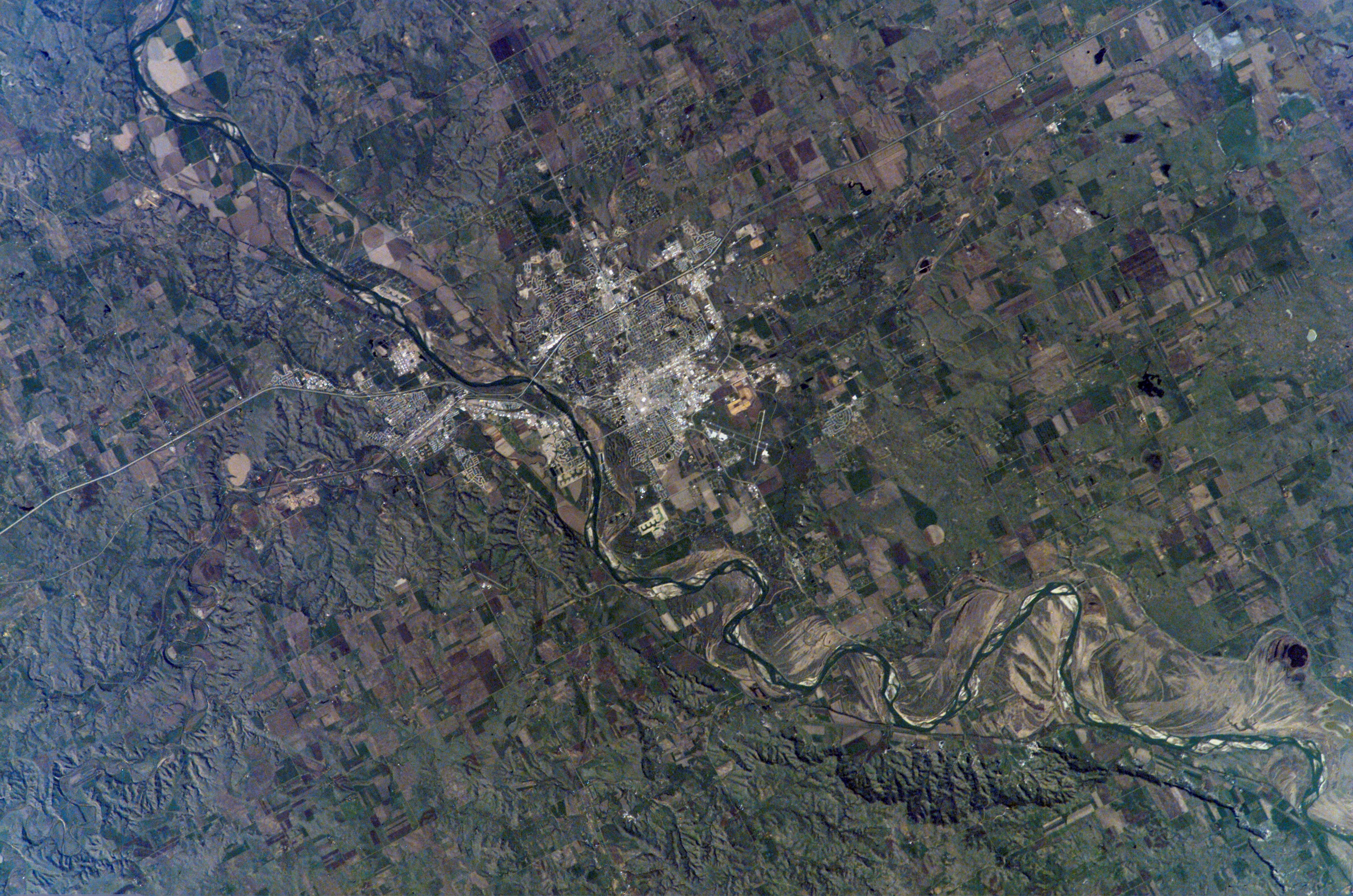
Mandan is on the left and Bismarck on the right in this 2007 photograph taken from the International Space Station.

According to the United States Census Bureau, the city has a total area of 13.665 square miles (35.39 km^{2}), of which 13.517 square miles (35.01 km^{2}) is land and 0.148 square miles (0.38 km^{2}) (1.08%) is water.

=== Climate ===
This climatic region is typified by large seasonal temperature differences, with warm to hot (and often humid) summers and cold (sometimes severely cold) winters. According to the Köppen Climate Classification system, Mandan has a humid continental climate, abbreviated "Dfb" on climate maps.

Climate data for Mandan, North Dakota (1991–2020 normals, extremes 1913–present)
Month	Jan	Feb	Mar	Apr	May	Jun	Jul	Aug	Sep	Oct	Nov	Dec	Year
Record high °F (°C)	63 (17)	68 (20)	82 (28)	94 (34)	102 (39)	110 (43)	115 (46)	109 (43)	104 (40)	96 (36)	80 (27)	66 (19)	115 (46)
Mean daily maximum °F (°C)	22.5 (−5.3)	27.1 (−2.7)	39.6 (4.2)	54.1 (12.3)	66.5 (19.2)	76.0 (24.4)	82.6 (28.1)	81.8 (27.7)	72.1 (22.3)	56.1 (13.4)	39.9 (4.4)	27.4 (−2.6)	53.8 (12.1)
Daily mean °F (°C)	12.6 (−10.8)	16.7 (−8.5)	29.0 (−1.7)	42.3 (5.7)	54.5 (12.5)	64.5 (18.1)	70.3 (21.3)	68.7 (20.4)	59.0 (15.0)	44.1 (6.7)	29.5 (−1.4)	17.9 (−7.8)	42.4 (5.8)
Mean daily minimum °F (°C)	2.7 (−16.3)	6.4 (−14.2)	18.3 (−7.6)	30.4 (−0.9)	42.6 (5.9)	53.0 (11.7)	58.0 (14.4)	55.5 (13.1)	45.8 (7.7)	32.1 (0.1)	19.1 (−7.2)	8.4 (−13.1)	31.0 (−0.6)
Record low °F (°C)	−43 (−42)	−46 (−43)	−30 (−34)	−8 (−22)	13 (−11)	28 (−2)	36 (2)	32 (0)	14 (−10)	−14 (−26)	−26 (−32)	−46 (−43)	−46 (−43)
Average precipitation inches (mm)	0.38 (9.7)	0.40 (10)	0.59 (15)	1.27 (32)	2.59 (66)	3.44 (87)	3.24 (82)	2.19 (56)	1.64 (42)	1.47 (37)	0.63 (16)	0.52 (13)	18.36 (466)
Average precipitation days (≥ 0.01 in)	4.3	4.1	4.3	6.4	9.3	10.7	8.8	6.8	6.1	6.0	3.6	4.7	75.1
Source 1: National Oceanic and Atmospheric Administration
Source 2: National Centers for Environmental Information

== Demographics ==
Historical population
Census	Pop.	Note	%±
1880	239		—
1890	1,328		455.6%
1900	1,658		24.8%
1910	3,873		133.6%
1920	4,336		12.0%
1930	5,037		16.2%
1940	6,685		32.7%
1950	7,298		9.2%
1960	10,525		44.2%
1970	11,093		5.4%
1980	15,513		39.8%
1990	15,177		−2.2%
2000	16,718		10.2%
2010	18,331		9.6%
2020	24,206		32.0%
2025 (est.)	25,061		3.5%
U.S. Decennial Census; 2020 Census

According to realtor website Zillow, the average price of a home as of June 30, 2026, in Mandan was $349,814.

As of the 2024 American Community Survey, there were 10,465 estimated households in Mandan with an average of 2.30 persons per household. The city has a median household income of $71,780. Approximately 9.8% of the city's population lives at or below the poverty line. Mandan has an estimated 69.6% employment rate, with 30.2% of the population holding a bachelor's degree or higher and 95.2% holding a high school diploma. There were 11,491 housing units at an average density of 850.11 per square mile (328.2/km^{2}).

The top five reported languages (people were allowed to report up to two languages, thus the figures will generally add to more than 100%) were English (93.3%), Spanish (4.5%), Indo-European (1.1%), Asian and Pacific Islander (0.5%), and Other (0.7%).

The median age in the city was 36.1 years.

Mandan, North Dakota – racial and ethnic composition Note: the US Census treats Hispanic/Latino as an ethnic category. This table excludes Latinos from the racial categories and assigns them to a separate category. Hispanics/Latinos may be of any race.
Race / ethnicity (NH = non-Hispanic)	Pop. 1980	Pop. 1990	Pop. 2000	Pop. 2010	Pop. 2020
White alone (NH)	15,295 (98.59%)	14,749 (97.18%)	15,801 (94.51%)	16,661 (90.89%)	20,231 (83.58%)
Black or African American alone (NH)	3 (0.02%)	11 (0.07%)	34 (0.20%)	105 (0.57%)	435 (1.80%)
Native American or Alaska Native alone (NH)	89 (0.57%)	322 (2.12%)	494 (2.95%)	878 (4.79%)	1,139 (4.71%)
Asian alone (NH)	64 (0.41%)	35 (0.23%)	56 (0.33%)	40 (0.22%)	153 (0.63%)
Pacific Islander alone (NH)	—	—	2 (0.01%)	14 (0.08%)	32 (0.13%)
Other race alone (NH)	8 (0.05%)	0 (0.00%)	7 (0.04%)	8 (0.04%)	58 (0.24%)
Mixed race or multiracial (NH)	—	—	194 (1.16%)	300 (1.64%)	1,004 (4.15%)
Hispanic or Latino (any race)	54 (0.35%)	60 (0.40%)	130 (0.78%)	325 (1.77%)	1,154 (4.77%)
Total	15,513 (100.00%)	15,177 (100.00%)	16,718 (100.00%)	18,331 (100.00%)	24,206 (100.00%)

=== 2020 census ===
As of the 2020 census, there were 24,206 people, 10,222 households, and 6,016 families residing in the city. The population density was 1,790.78 inhabitants per square mile (691.4/km^{2}). There were 10,960 housing units at an average density of 810.83 per square mile (313.1/km^{2}). The racial makeup of the city was 84.82% White, 1.81% African American, 5.02% Native American, 0.65% Asian, 0.13% Pacific Islander, 1.88% from some other races and 5.68% from two or more races. Hispanic or Latino people of any race were 4.77% of the population.

=== 2010 census ===
As of the 2010 census, there were 18,331 people, 7,632 households, and 4,921 families residing in the city. The population density was 1,662.22 inhabitants per square mile (641.8/km^{2}). There were 7,950 housing units at an average density of 720.89 inhabitants per square mile (278.3/km^{2}). The racial makeup was 91.72% White, 0.61% African American, 4.93% Native American, 0.22% Asian, 0.08% Pacific Islander, 0.47% from some other races and 1.96% from two or more races. Hispanic or Latino people of any race were 1.77% of the population.

There were 7,632 households, of which 31.6% had children under the age of 18 living with them, 48.4% were married couples living together, 11.5% had a female householder with no husband present, 4.6% had a male householder with no wife present, and 35.5% were non-families. 28.9% of all households were made up of individuals, and 10.5% had someone living alone who was 65 years of age or older. The average household size was 2.35 and the average family size was 2.89.

The median age in the city was 37.2 years. 23.9% of residents were under the age of 18; 8.2% were between the ages of 18 and 24; 27.3% were from 25 to 44; 27.2% were from 45 to 64; and 13.2% were 65 years of age or older. The gender makeup of the city was 49.2% male and 50.8% female.

=== 2000 census ===
As of the 2000 census, there were 16,718 people, 6,647 households, and 4,553 families residing in the city. The population density was 1,642.75 inhabitants per square mile (634.3/km^{2}). There were 6,958 housing units at an average density of 683.71 inhabitants per square mile (264.0/km^{2}). The racial makeup of the city was 94.98% White, 0.20% African American, 3.02% Native American, 0.33% Asian, 0.01% Pacific Islander, 0.15% from some other races, and 1.30% from two or more races. Hispanic or Latino people of any race were 0.78% of the population.

The top six ancestry groups in the city were German (61.3%), Norwegian (15.4%), Russian (13.1%), Irish (7.9%), English (4.2%), and Native American (3.02%).

There were 6,647 households, out of which 35.7% had children under the age of 18 living with them, 54.1% were married couples living together, 10.6% had a female householder with no husband present, and 31.5% were non-families. 26.4% of all households were made up of individuals, and 10.1% had someone living alone who was 65 years of age or older. The average household size was 2.48 and the average family size was 3.01.

In the city, the population was spread out, with 27.0% under the age of 18, 9.0% from 18 to 24, 29.7% from 25 to 44, 21.6% from 45 to 64, and 12.7% who were 65 years of age or older. The median age was 36 years. For every 100 females, there were 97.0 males. For every 100 females age 18 and over, there were 93.6 males.

The median income for a household in the city was $38,182, and the median income for a family was $46,210. Males had a median income of $31,653 versus $21,400 for females. The per capita income for the city was $17,509. About 7.0% of families and 10.0% of the population were below the poverty line, including 12.2% of those under age 18 and 13.6% of those age 65 or over.

== Economy ==
The economy of the surrounding area is largely agriculture-based. Mandan once had five grain elevators and a flour mill, but none of these remain today. The city continues to support the agricultural industry with livestock sale ring, farm implement dealers and suppliers and finance/lending institutions. But its original purpose was support for the railroad. Subsequent access to rail transportation allowed the agricultural, commercial and industrial sectors to flourish.

In recent decades, Mandan has diversified its economy to include food processing, petroleum refining, electrical power generation, software development, manufacturing and retail trade as well as all manner of professional services for its residents. A federal institution and a women's state prison border the city.

=== Information services ===
National Information Solutions Cooperative (NISC) is an information technology company that develops and supports software and hardware solutions for its member-owners, who are primarily utility cooperatives and broadband companies. NISC provides IT solutions for consumer and subscriber billing, accounting, engineering & operations, as well as other IT solutions. In 2021, IDG Insider Pro and Computerworld Magazine honored NISC as one of the Top 100 "Best Places to Work in IT" for the 18th consecutive year for midsize organizations (companies with 1,001 to 4,999 employees). NISC and its subsidiaries employ over 1,300 people with offices in Iowa, Missouri, North Dakota, and Virginia. Over 450 of these employees work at NISC's Vern Dosch National Campus in Mandan, making it the city's second-largest employer.

Laducer & Associates, Inc. specializes in large-scale information processing, with emphasis on data entry and data capture, for clients including the federal government. It is one of the city's largest private employers.

=== Energy industry ===
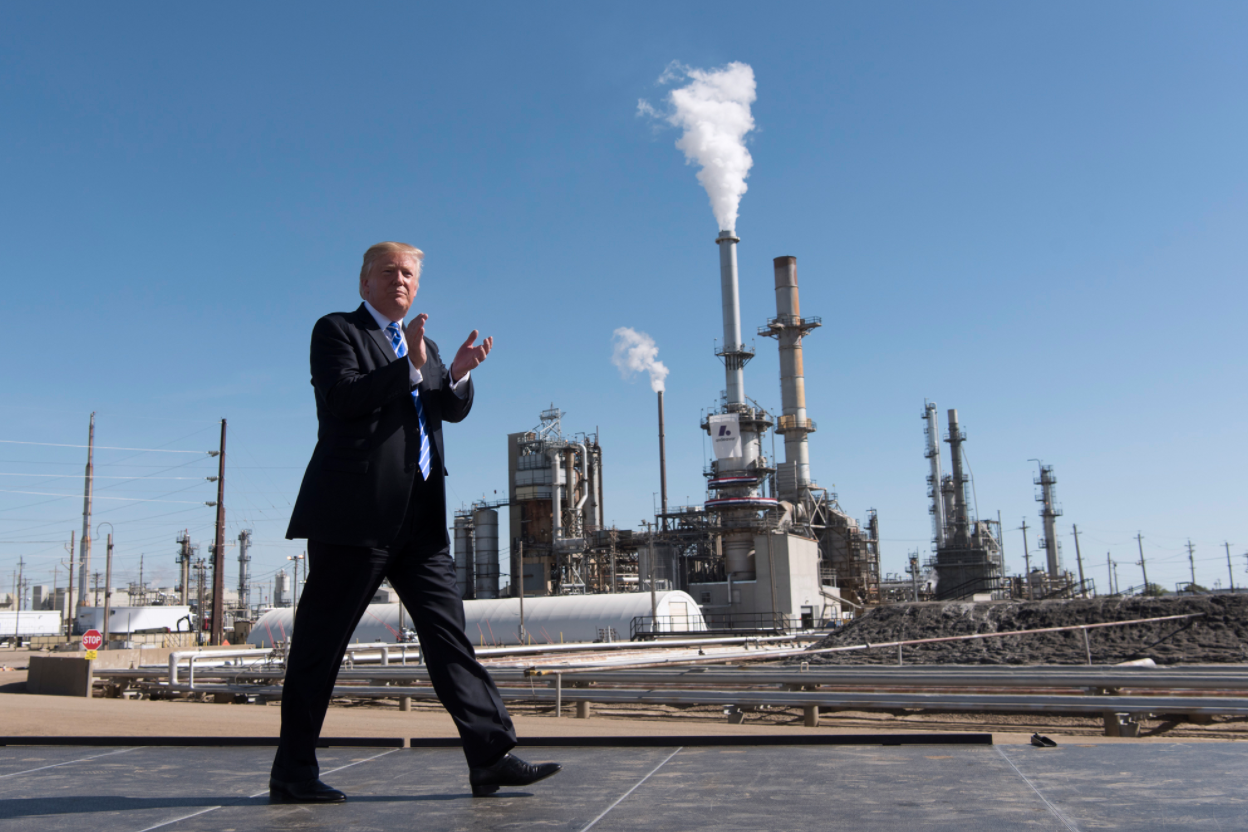
Donald Trump at Mandan Refinery in 2017

A Marathon Petroleum oil refinery north of Mandan began operations in 1954 as a unit of the American Oil Company, with a 29,000 barrels per day (BPD) capacity. Today, the Mandan Refinery's nameplate capacity of 73,800 BPD processes primarily North Dakota sweet (low sulfur) crude oil into a full range of refined petroleum products. The refinery became part of the British Petroleum (BP) system as part of the BP-Amoco merger in January 2001. BP sold the site to Tesoro Corporation in September 2001; Tesoro became Andeavor in August 2017; and Marathon Petroleum purchased Andeavor in October 2018. In total 250 employees are based at the site, including the Andeavor Logistics LP group, which supports trucking and crude pipeline and natural gas transportation and processing operations.

R.M. Heskett Station is an electric generating station operated by Montana-Dakota Utilities Co. along the Missouri River about four miles northeast of downtown Mandan. Until February 2022, most power was generated by two lignite coal-fired boilers. The smaller 25-megawatt unit which went online in 1954 was a spreader stoker design. The larger 75-megawatt unit went online in 1963 but was converted to a modern fluidized design in the early 1980s. Both coal-fired units were dismantled in 2022 and 2023, respectively. An 88MW Simple Cycle Combustion Turbine "peaking unit" was added to the station in July 2014. A second 88MW natural gas-combustion turbine was added in 2023. The plant is named for R.M. Heskett, the founder of Montana-Dakota Utilities Co.

=== Governmental institutions ===
As the seat of Morton County, all major governmental service offices are in Mandan, including the courthouse. Morton County employs about 170 people, the majority residing in Mandan. The City of Mandan offices include facilities to house approximately 140 people.

In August 1912, Congress passed a bill to establish the Northern Great Plains Research Station. Ground was broken in September 1913. It remains the country's second-largest federal dry land experimental station. Dryland farming in all of its phases is carried on at the station, as well as the development of new grains and fruits. The station employs approximately 20 people, including doctorate-level professionals.

The North Dakota Youth Correctional Center maintains custody of up to 107 youth committed to its care by the Juvenile Courts. Operated by the State of North Dakota, the campus includes four cottages, administration and education facilities, a gymnasium with an indoor swimming pool, a chapel and a cafeteria. Until 1947 the facility, then called the State Training School, also served as an orphanage, especially for the children of incarcerated criminals. But other orphaned children, typically by accidents, were also assigned there.

== Education ==
The Mandan Public School District 1 (also known as Morton County District #1) was formally organized on April 23, 1881. Reorganization in 1969

The area is served by the Mandan Public School District 1. It operates the Mandan School. In the 2025-26 academic year, the district reported a total of 4,452 students.

Mandan Public Schools operates Roosevelt Elementary School, Mary Stark Elementary School, Lewis & Clark Elementary School, Lakewood Elementary School, Ft. Lincoln Elementary School, Custer Elementary School, Red Trail Elementary School, Mandan Middle School, Mandan High School, and the Brave Center Academy night school. In 2016, the Mandan Public School District was Morton County's largest employer, with approximately 700 employees.

The city's Catholic parishes (of the Roman Catholic Diocese of Bismarck) operate two private K–6 schools: Christ the King School and St. Joseph School.

Bismarck State College operates two campuses in Mandan focusing on post-secondary vocational education. Its Mechanical Maintenance Technology program is based out of its east Mandan campus. The Electrical Lineworker School is at a facility in northwest Mandan.

== Media ==
Mandan shares a print, radio, and television media market with Bismarck.

== Infrastructure ==
=== Transportation ===
==== Freight rail ====
The city originated to support the operation of the Northern Pacific Railroad. First platting documents were filed in 1873. A rail division headquarters and major maintenance facility were established in Mandan in 1881 to support operation from the Missouri River west to the Yellowstone River near Glendive, Montana. The Northern Pacific became part of the Burlington Northern Railroad in 1970 and part of the Burlington Northern Santa Fe Railway in 1995. Known since 2005 as BNSF Railway, it operates the railroad facilities in Mandan and the surrounding communities. Over 320 BNSF employees are based in Mandan.

==== Public Transit ====
Bis-Man Transit provides fixed route and demand response mass transit service to Mandan.

==== Mandan Railroad Passenger Service ====
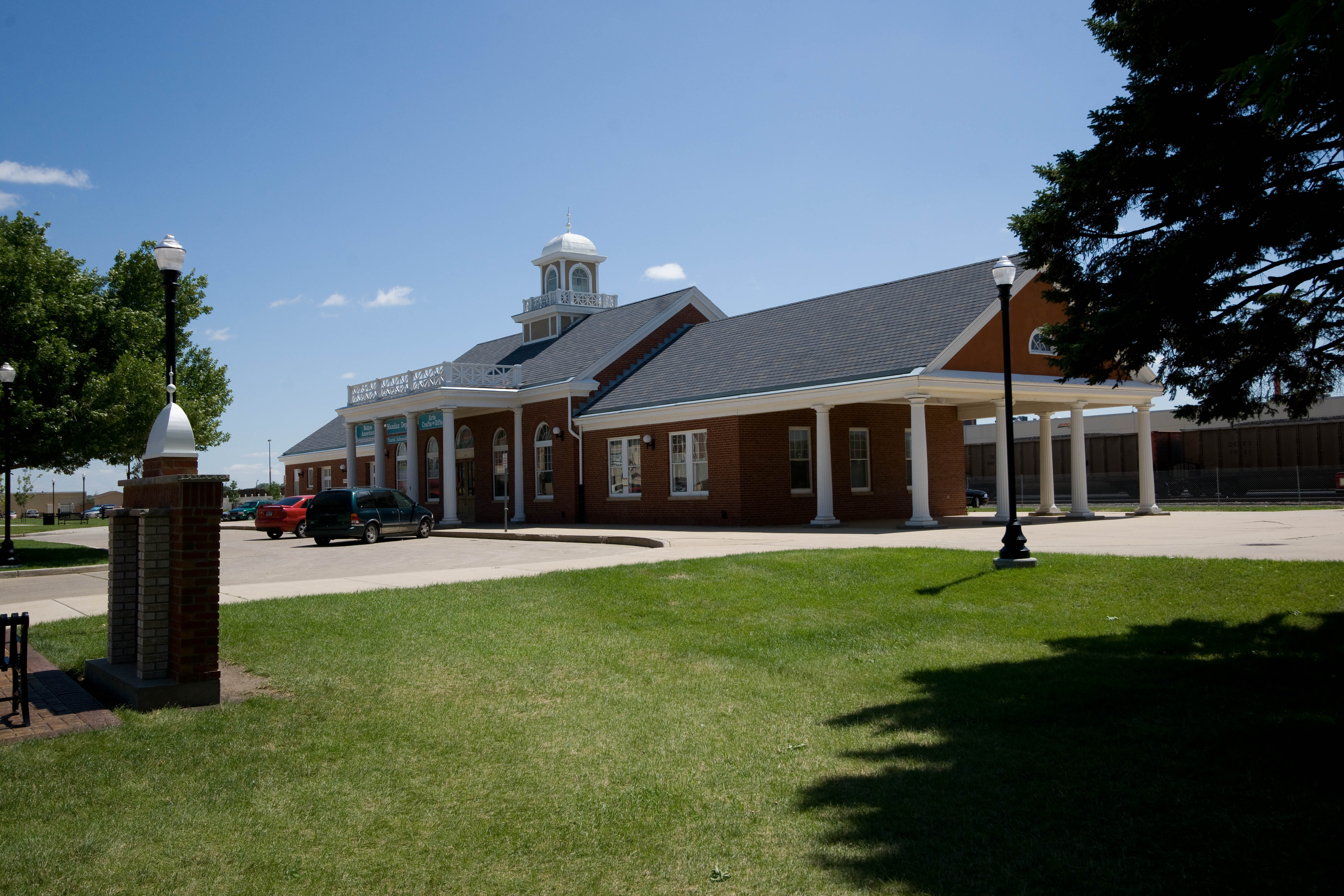
The historic Northern Pacific railroad depot in the Mandan Commercial Historic District, which now contains a German restaurant

Mandan was a scheduled meal stop for the Northern Pacific Railway east-west passenger line beginning in 1882. The service was subsequently provided by Burlington Northern Railroad and Amtrak. Amtrak discontinued the North Coast Hiawatha passenger service along the south half of the state in 1979. The existing "beanery" lunchroom and depot were constructed in 1928 and 1930, respectively as replacements at the site.

=== Hospitals ===
Triumph Hospital Central Dakotas is a 41-bed critical care hospital in Mandan.

== Notable people ==
- Frank L. Anders, Congressional Medal of Honor recipient, engineer, businessman, amateur military historian and politician
- Marlo Anderson, founder of National Day Calendar
- Henry Waldo Coe, Mandan resident, among the first physicians in Dakota Territory, elected to state office, close friend of Theodore Roosevelt
- Tony Dean, television broadcaster, columnist and conservationist. Dean's real name was Anthony DeChandt
- Ivan Dmitri, AKA Levon West; artist, photographer and printmaker; gained international recognition as an artist for his etching "The Spirit of St. Louis"
- Rachel Eckroth, Grammy-nominated musician
- Ron Erhardt, born and grew up in Mandan, became head coach of the New England Patriots
- Julie Fedorchak, U.S. representative, former member of the North Dakota Public Service Commission
- Isabella Greenway, first woman elected to the U.S. Senate from Arizona
- Heidi Heitkamp, former U.S. Senator, resides in rural Mandan
- Tom Huff, Washington State Representative
- Richard Longfellow, Congressional Medal of Honor recipient
- Eugene McCarthy, American politician, U.S. Senator, Presidential candidate, writer, & academic
- Abigail McCarthy, American academic and writer
- Arthur Peterson, Jr., actor born and raised in Mandan
- A. R. Shaw, educator and politician
- Era Bell Thompson, author and editor of Ebony magazine

== See also ==
- Huff Hills
- Fort Abraham Lincoln
- Mandan Refinery
- List of oil pipelines
- List of oil refineries
