= Horace, North Dakota =

- City
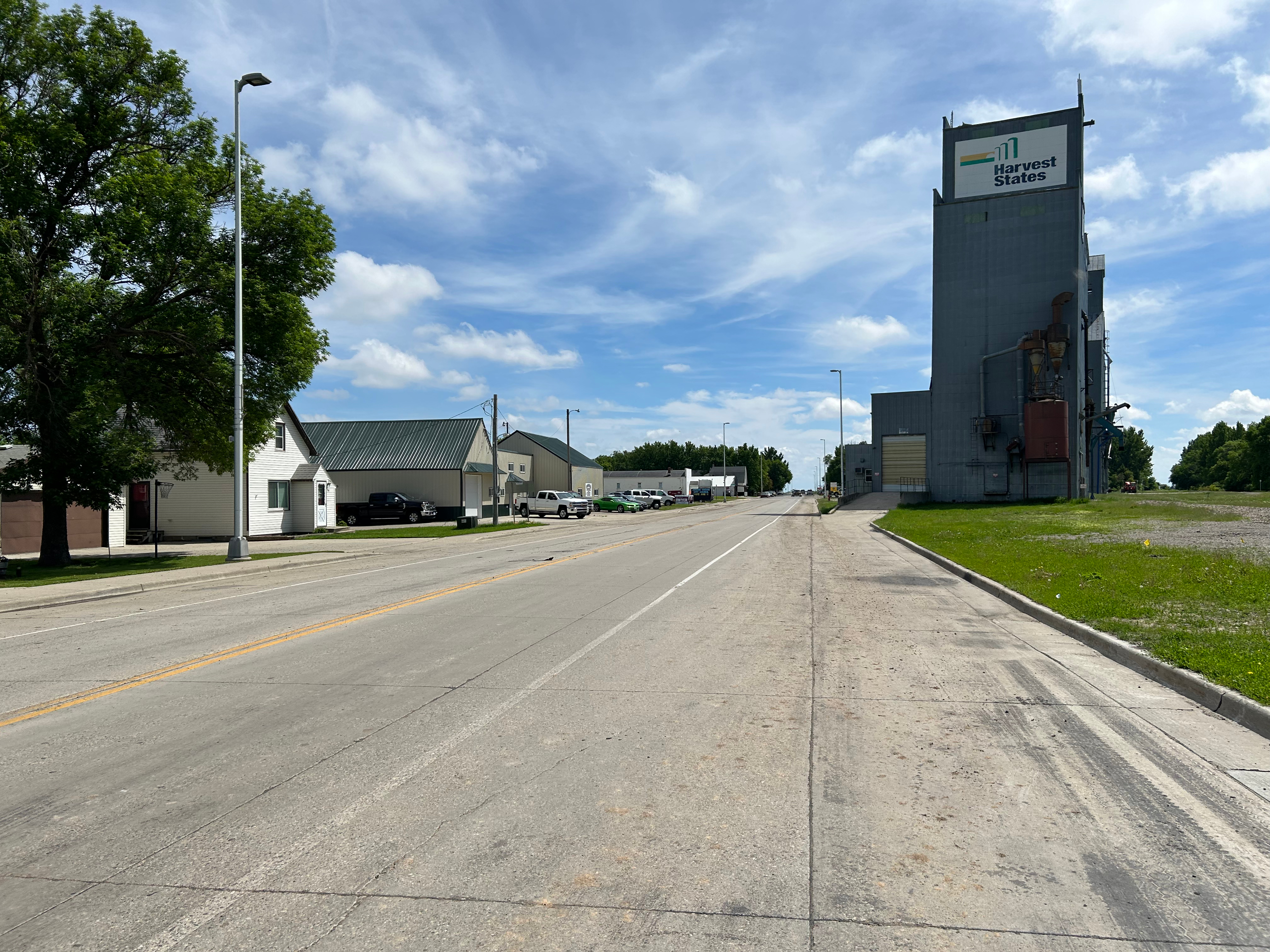
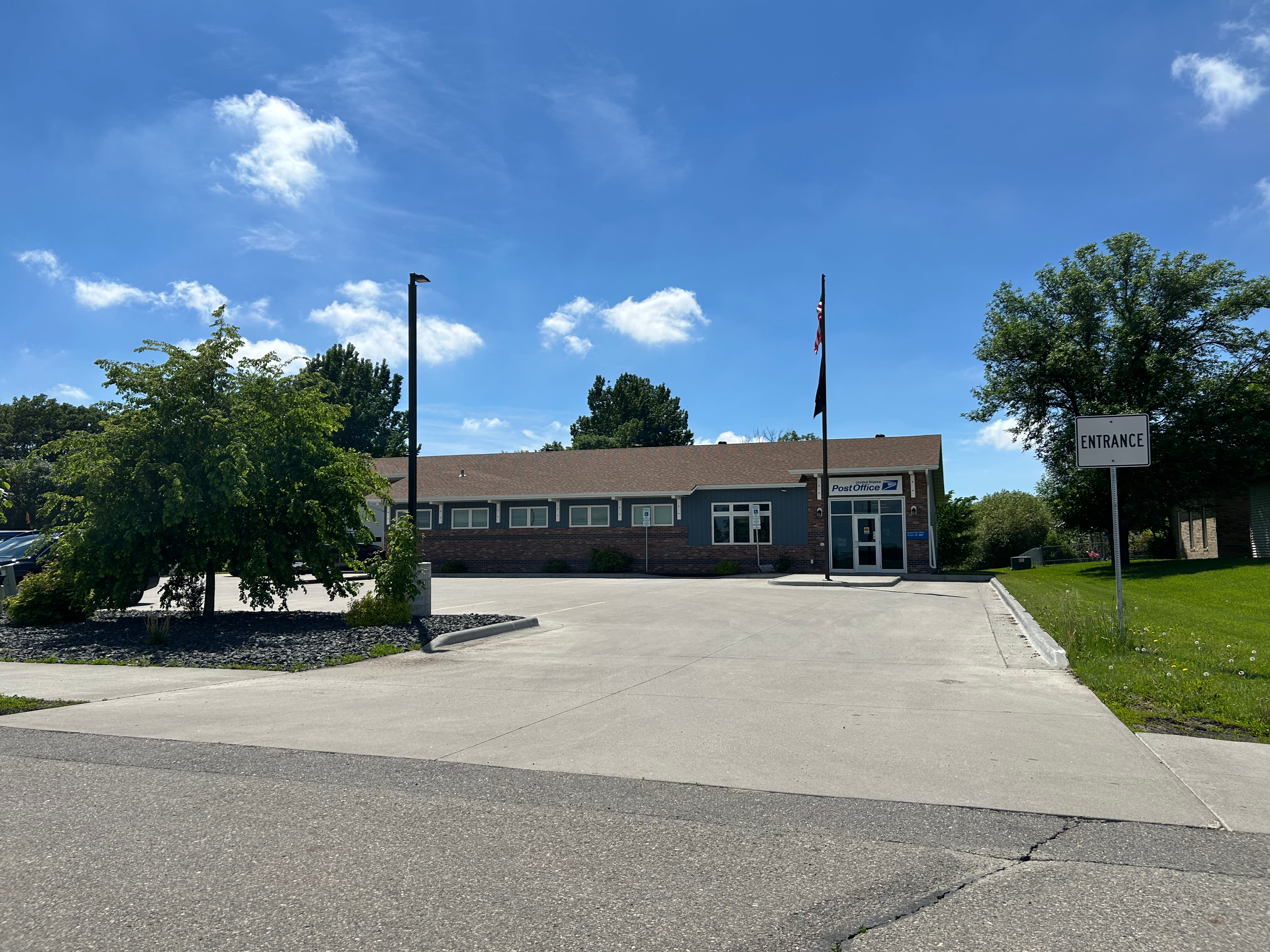
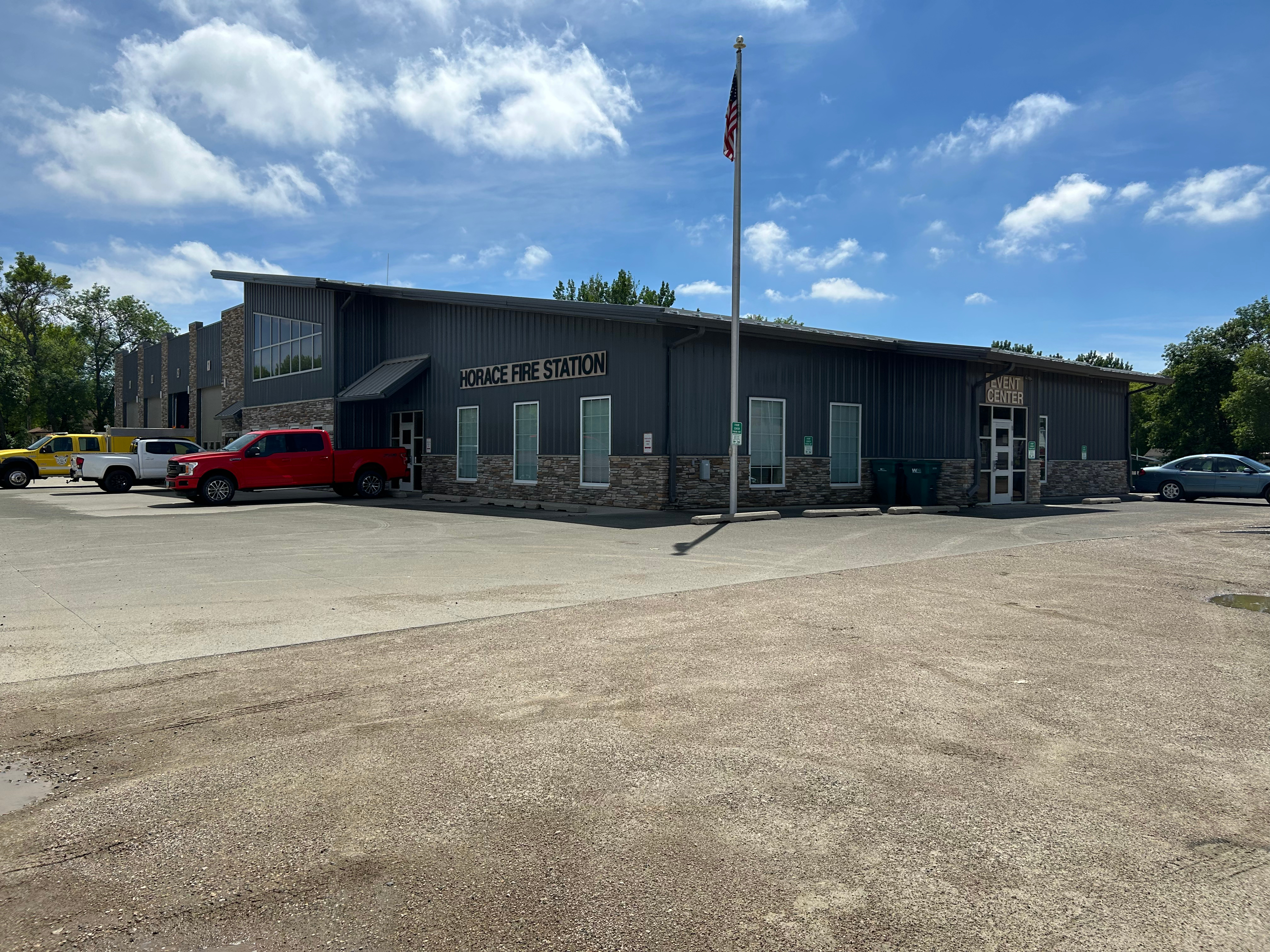
- Near the grain elevator within Horace U.S. Post Office in Horace, ND. Southern Valley Fire Station & Event Center on Main Street.

- Logo
- Motto: Horizons Expand Here.
- Interactive map of Horace, North Dakota
- Location within North Dakota
- Coordinates: 46.7570°N 96.9113°W
- Country: United States
- State: North Dakota
- County: Cass
- Metro: Fargo–Moorhead
- Founded: 1882
- Incorporated (village): March 12, 1941
- Incorporated (city): July 1, 1967
- Named for: Horace Greeley

Government
  - Type: Mayor–Council
  - Mayor: Jeff Trudeau
  - Councilmembers: Rachel Dwyer; Naomi Burkland; Ross Renner; Chad Chalmers

Area
  - City: 12.693 sq mi (32.875 km^{2})
  - Land: 12.690 sq mi (32.866 km^{2})
  - Water: 0.0027 sq mi (0.007 km^{2}) 0.02%
- Elevation: 912 ft (278 m)

Population (2020)
  - City: 3,085
  - Estimate (2025): 7,001
  - Density: 243.1/sq mi (93.87/km^{2})
  - Urban: 216,214
  - Metro: 269,528
  - Combined: 292,547
- Time zone: UTC–6 (Central (CST))
  - Summer (DST): UTC–5 (CDT)
- ZIP Code: 58047
- Area code: 701
- FIPS code: 38-38900
- GNIS feature ID: 1036095
- Highways: County Roads 6, 14, 16, & 17
- Website: cityofhorace.com

Horace is a city in Cass County, North Dakota, United States. It is approximately 5–9 miles south of the city of West Fargo and 8–16 miles southwest of the city of Fargo. The population was 3,085 as of the 2020 census, and was estimated at 7,001 in 2025. In 2026, it is now 7,741. In fact, Horace is one of North Dakota's Fastest growing cities in the state. The city is a suburb of the Fargo–Moorhead metropolitan area. It is the 12th-most populous city in North Dakota. Horace was founded in 1882 at a time of widespread European-American settlement in the territory.

== History ==
A post office has been in operation at Horace since 1875. The city is named after Horace Greeley of Chappaqua, New York, editor of the New York Tribune. Greeley encouraged western settlement with the motto "Go West, young man".

The city is bordered on the west by the Sheyenne River, a tributary of the Red River. To reduce damage from seasonal flooding, which sometimes was severe, the state and federal government collaborated on the Sheyenne Diversion Project, constructing a canal and associated support in 1990–1992 to move Sheyenne flood waters to the west and south of Horace, and north past the western side of West Fargo. This has proved its worth, protecting the Sheyenne cities from damage that resulted from the large 1997 Red River flood, which destroyed areas of Grand Forks and East Grand Forks to the north.

== Geography ==
According to the United States Census Bureau, the city has an area of 12.693 square miles (32.87 km^{2}), of which 12.690 square miles (32.87 km^{2}) is land and 0.003 square miles (0.01 km^{2}) (0.02%) is water.

== Economy ==
With its rapid population growth since the city's incorporation, much of the city's income depends on the retail industry. The city's retail core, which largely developed in the 2020s, is located along the County Road 17 (170th Ave SE) corridor.

- Casey's opened in 2010
- Dairy Queen Grill & Chill opened in November 2022
- Sanford Health opened in November 2023
- Circle K opened in November 2024
- McDonald's opened in November 2026
- Hornbacher's will open in early 2027
- Essentia Health-Horace Clinic will open in late 2027

== Government ==
The city is governed by a mayor–council government consisting of a four-person city council.

Fire protection is provided by Southern Valley Fire & Rescue.

Public schools in the city are part of the West Fargo Public School District 6.

== Demographics ==
Historical population
Census	Pop.	Note	%±
1950	190		—
1960	178		−6.3%
1970	276		55.1%
1980	494		79.0%
1990	662		34.0%
2000	915		38.2%
2010	2,430		165.6%
2020	3,085		27.0%
2025 (est.)	7,001		126.9%
U.S. Decennial Census; 2020 Census

According to realtor website Zillow, the average price of a home as of October 31, 2026, in Horace was $403,431.

As of the 2024 American Community Survey, there were 1,650 estimated households in Horace with an average of 2.78 persons per household. The city has a median household income of $138,578. Approximately 4.3% of the city's population lives at or below the poverty line. Horace has an estimated 80.4% employment rate, with 45.0% of the population holding a bachelor's degree or higher and 96.6% holding a high school diploma. There were 1,711 housing units at an average density of 134.83 per square mile (52.06/km^{2}).

The top five reported languages (people were allowed to report up to two languages, thus the figures will generally add to more than 100%) were English (95.7%), Spanish (3.6%), Indo-European (0.5%), Asian and Pacific Islander (0.0%), and Other (0.2%).

The median age in the city was 33.9 years.

Horace, North Dakota – racial and ethnic composition Note: the US Census treats Hispanic/Latino as an ethnic category. This table excludes Latinos from the racial categories and assigns them to a separate category. Hispanics/Latinos may be of any race.
Race / ethnicity (NH = non-Hispanic)	Pop. 2000	Pop. 2010	Pop. 2020	% 2000	% 2010	% 2020
White alone (NH)	899	2,350	2,857	98.25%	96.71%	92.61%
Black or African American alone (NH)	1	11	25	0.11%	0.45%	0.81%
Native American or Alaska Native alone (NH)	4	31	34	0.44%	1.28%	1.10%
Asian alone (NH)	2	4	3	0.22%	0.16%	0.10%
Pacific Islander alone (NH)	0	0	0	0.00%	0.00%	0.00%
Other race alone (NH)	3	0	17	0.33%	0.00%	0.55%
Mixed race or multiracial (NH)	3	12	90	0.33%	0.49%	2.92%
Hispanic or Latino (any race)	3	22	59	0.33%	0.91%	1.91%
Total	915	2,430	3,085	100.00%	100.00%	100.00%

=== 2020 census ===
As of the 2020 census, there were 3,085 people, 1,049 households, and 868 families residing in the city. The population density was 267.31 inhabitants per square mile (103.21/km^{2}). There were 1,101 housing units at an average density of 95.40 per square mile (36.83/km^{2}). The racial makeup of the city was 93.16% White, 0.88% African American, 1.23% Native American, 0.16% Asian, 0.00% Pacific Islander, 0.88% from some other races and 3.70% from two or more races. Hispanic or Latino people of any race were 1.91% of the population.

=== 2010 census ===
As of the 2010 census, there were 2,430 people, 810 households, and 682 families residing in the city. The population density was 225.69 inhabitants per square mile (87.14/km^{2}). There were 826 housing units at an average density of 76.72 per square mile (29.62/km^{2}). The racial makeup of the city was 97.08% White, 0.45% African American, 1.40% Native American, 0.16% Asian, 0.00% Pacific Islander, 0.16% from some other races and 0.74% from two or more races. Hispanic or Latino people of any race were 0.91% of the population.

There were 810 households, of which 50.1% had children under the age of 18 living with them, 74.4% were married couples living together, 4.4% had a female householder with no husband present, 5.3% had a male householder with no wife present, and 15.8% were non-families. 12.3% of all households were made up of individuals, and 1.4% had someone living alone who was 65 years of age or older. The average household size was 3.00 and the average family size was 3.27.

The median age in the city was 35.6 years. 33.4% of residents were under the age of 18; 5.1% were between the ages of 18 and 24; 29.6% were from 25 to 44; 26.9% were from 45 to 64; and 4.9% were 65 years of age or older. The gender makeup of the city was 50.6% male and 49.4% female.

=== 2000 census ===
As of the 2000 census, there were 915 people, 300 households, and 248 families residing in the city. The population density was 408.70 inhabitants per square mile (157.80/km^{2}). There were 311 housing units at an average density of 138.91 per square mile (53.63/km^{2}). The racial makeup of the city was 98.47% White, 0.11% African American, 0.55% Native American, 0.22% Asian, 0.00% Pacific Islander, 0.33% from some other races and 0.33% from two or more races. Hispanic or Latino people of any race were 0.33% of the population.

There were 300 households, out of which 55.7% had children under the age of 18 living with them, 68.3% were married couples living together, 10.0% had a female householder with no husband present, and 17.3% were non-families. 11.3% of all households were made up of individuals, and 2.7% had someone living alone who was 65 years of age or older. The average household size was 3.05 and the average family size was 3.29.

In the city, the population was spread out, with 35.7% under the age of 18, 7.0% from 18 to 24, 37.5% from 25 to 44, 15.6% from 45 to 64, and 4.2% who were 65 years of age or older. The median age was 30 years. For every 100 females, there were 92.6 males. For every 100 females age 18 and over, there were 98.0 males.

The median income for a household in the city was $46,510, and the median income for a family was $47,639. Males had a median income of $31,875 versus $20,924 for females. The per capita income for the city was $15,761. About 3.2% of families and 3.9% of the population were below the poverty line, including 3.6% of those under age 18 and 9.5% of those age 65 or over.

== Education ==
The West Fargo Public School District 6

- Horace Elementary School
- Heritage Middle School
- Horace High School

The area is served by the West Fargo Public School District 6. It operates the Horace School. In the 2025-26 academic year, the district reported a total of 13,401 students.
