= Big Iron (disambiguation) =

Big Iron is a western ballad by Marty Robbins, released in 1960.

Big Iron may also refer to:

- Mainframe computer, a large, powerful computer
- Big Iron River, a river in Ontonagon County, Michigan
- Big Iron (album), an album by Carol Noonan
- "Big Iron", an episode of Knight Rider

== See also ==
- Big Iron Farm Show in West Fargo, North Dakota, USA
- Big Iron World, a 2006 album by Old Crow Medicine Show
