= Clarence Little =

Clarence Little may refer to:

- C. C. Little (Clarence Cook Little, 1888–1971), American genetics, cancer, and tobacco researcher and academic administrator
- Clarence B. Little (1857–1941), American attorney and politician from North Dakota
