= John Haggart =

John Haggart may refer to:

- John Graham Haggart, member of the Canadian Parliament
- John E. Haggart, member of the North Dakota Senate

== See also ==
- John Hagart, Scottish football player and manager
