= Senator McGillivray =

Senator McGillivray may refer to:

- Alexander C. McGillivray (1859–1907), North Dakota State Senate
- James J. McGillivray (1848–1925), Wisconsin State Senate

== See also ==
- Scott McGilvray (1966–2017), New Hampshire State Senate
- Tom McGillvray (born 1957), Montana State Senate
