= Driverless =

Driverless may refer to:

- A computer able to configure itself, without explicit driver software, see Plug-'n'-Play.
- A train without a human driver, see Automatic train operation.
- A vehicle which navigates without human input, see Autonomous car.
- Driverless tractor
- Driverless (film), a 2010 Chinese film directed by Zhang Yang.
