= Dagen's Grocery =

- U.S. National Register of Historic Places
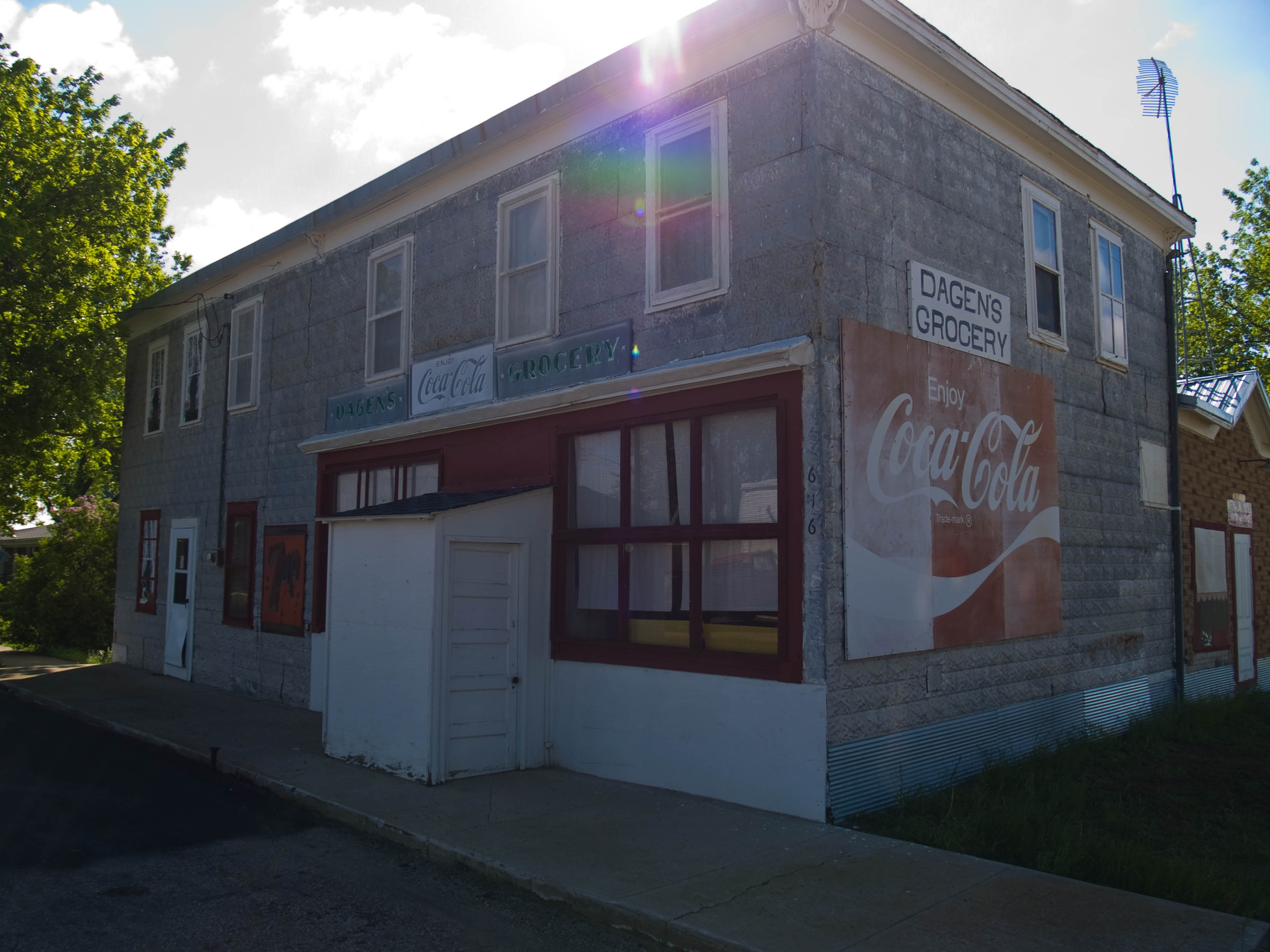

- Location within North Dakota Location within the United States
- Location: 616 Central Ave., Jud, North Dakota
- Coordinates: 46°31′38″N 98°53′49″W
- Area: 0.4 acres (0.16 ha)
- Built: 1905
- Built by: Ole B. Johnson & Sons
- Architectural style: Early Commercial
- NRHP reference No.: 05000659
- Added to NRHP: July 6, 2005

Dagen's Grocery, also or formerly known as Ole B. Johnson and Sons Hotel and Store, in Jud, North Dakota, is listed on the National Register of Historic Places. It was built in 1905 and includes Early Commercial architecture. It has served as a post office, as a department store, and as a hotel. The listing included two contributing buildings.
