= Bonanzaville, USA =

Museum in West Fargo, North Dakota

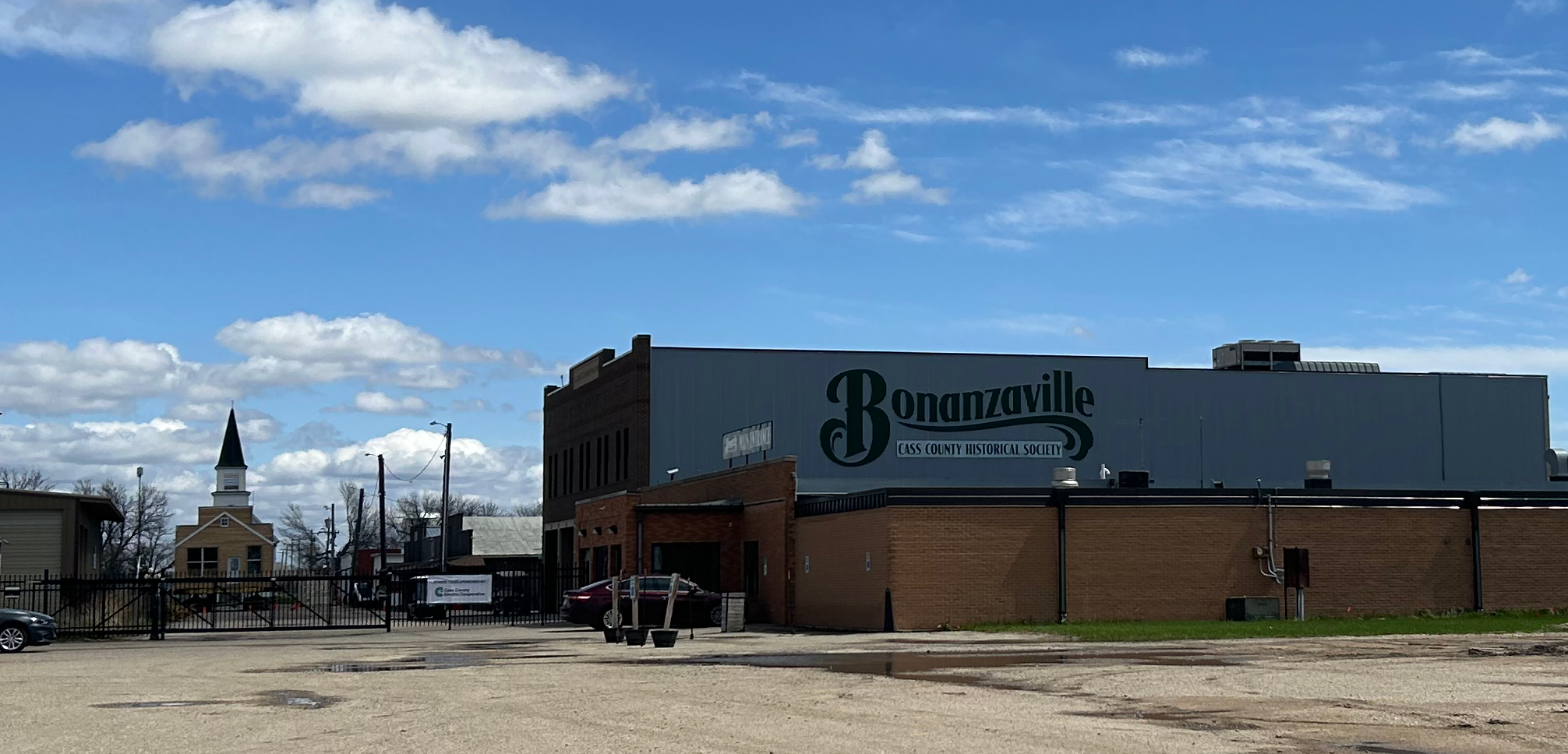
- Location: West Fargo, North Dakota, United States
- Coordinates: 46°52′34″N 96°55′41″W
- Website: www.bonanzaville.org

Bonanzaville, USA is a history museum complex in West Fargo, North Dakota. Bonanzaville, the museum of the Cass County Historical Society, is made up of forty buildings on 12 acres (49,000 m^{2}), many of them are historic and from the region. These buildings have been moved to the museum grounds and now form a village setting. Most of the buildings have a special theme. Displays include a prairie church, a general store, a drug store, a fire station, Fargo's first house, and a schoolhouse. There are also several newer buildings which have been constructed on the grounds including an aircraft museum and an automobile museum.

Other exhibits include horse-drawn vehicles, firefighting vehicles and equipment, medical and dental equipment, a law enforcement museum, a telephone museum, and a newspaper printing press. Bonanzaville has several hundred thousand artifacts in their collections and on display.

== Location and events ==
Bonanzaville is located just off of Interstate 94 (Exit 343) and about two and a half miles (4 km) west of the city of Fargo, North Dakota. The complex is open from May through September, but event venues are open year-round. The highlight of the museum's year is the annual "Pioneer Days", the largest and longest-running annual event in the Fargo–Moorhead area. The event is held the third weekend of August. Other popular events include the July 4 Celebration, Ghost Tours, Paranormal Investigations, and Christmas on the Prairie. In November 2018, the producers of Antiques Roadshow announced that the historical television show was planning to film at Bonanzaville in June 2019.

== Exhibits ==
An exhibit on the Jewish experience in North Dakota opened in 2017. The North Dakota State University Fargo History Project prepared an exhibit on the Spanish–American War that opened in 2019.

== Telephone Pioneers Museum ==
The telephone museum was a hardware store donated by Oscar Loken of Tower City and converted by US WEST Telephone Pioneers. The exhibits show telecommunications devices, such as receivers, switching equipment, and glass or porcelain line insulators. Many of the telephone equipment was from the local service area of Northwestern Bell Telephone Company. Old and new type cable were removed from Fargo in 1978 and are on display.

The Telephone Pioneers maintain the telephone equipment which allows calls to be made from one building to another.

There are various telephony related items in the museum.

== Flooding ==
A spill of 200,000 US gallons (760,000 L) of water flooded Bonanzaville in January 2019.

== Gallery ==
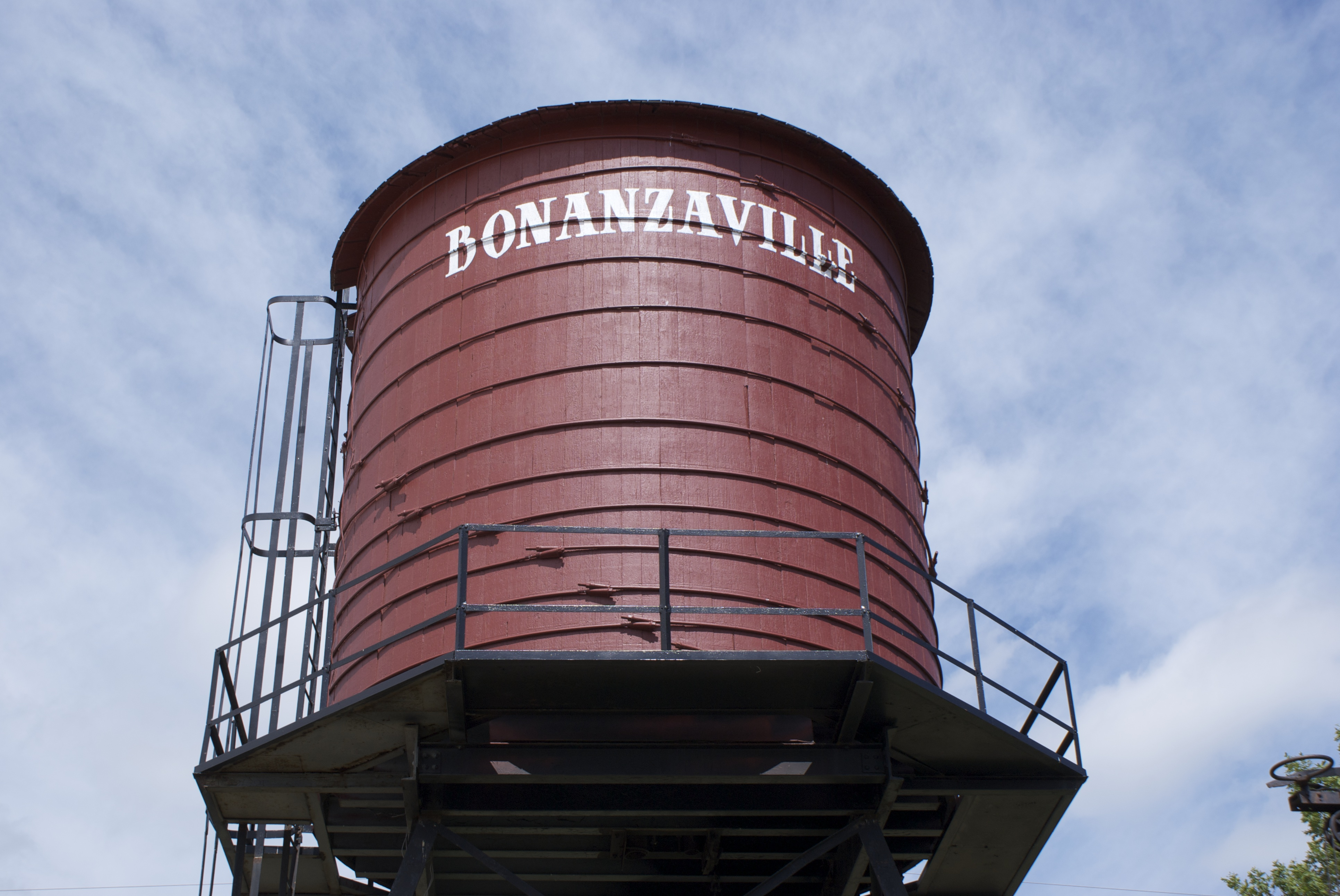

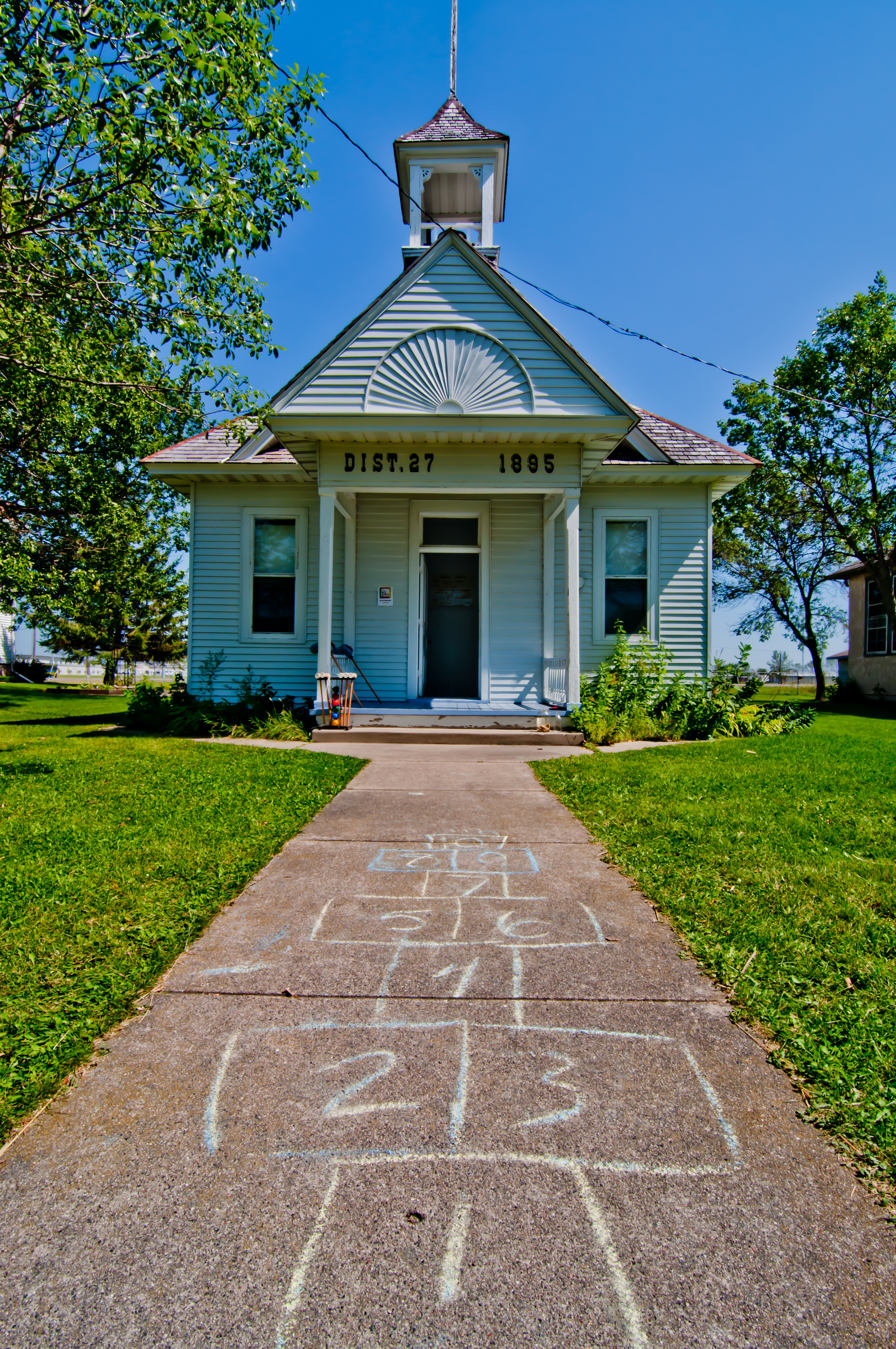

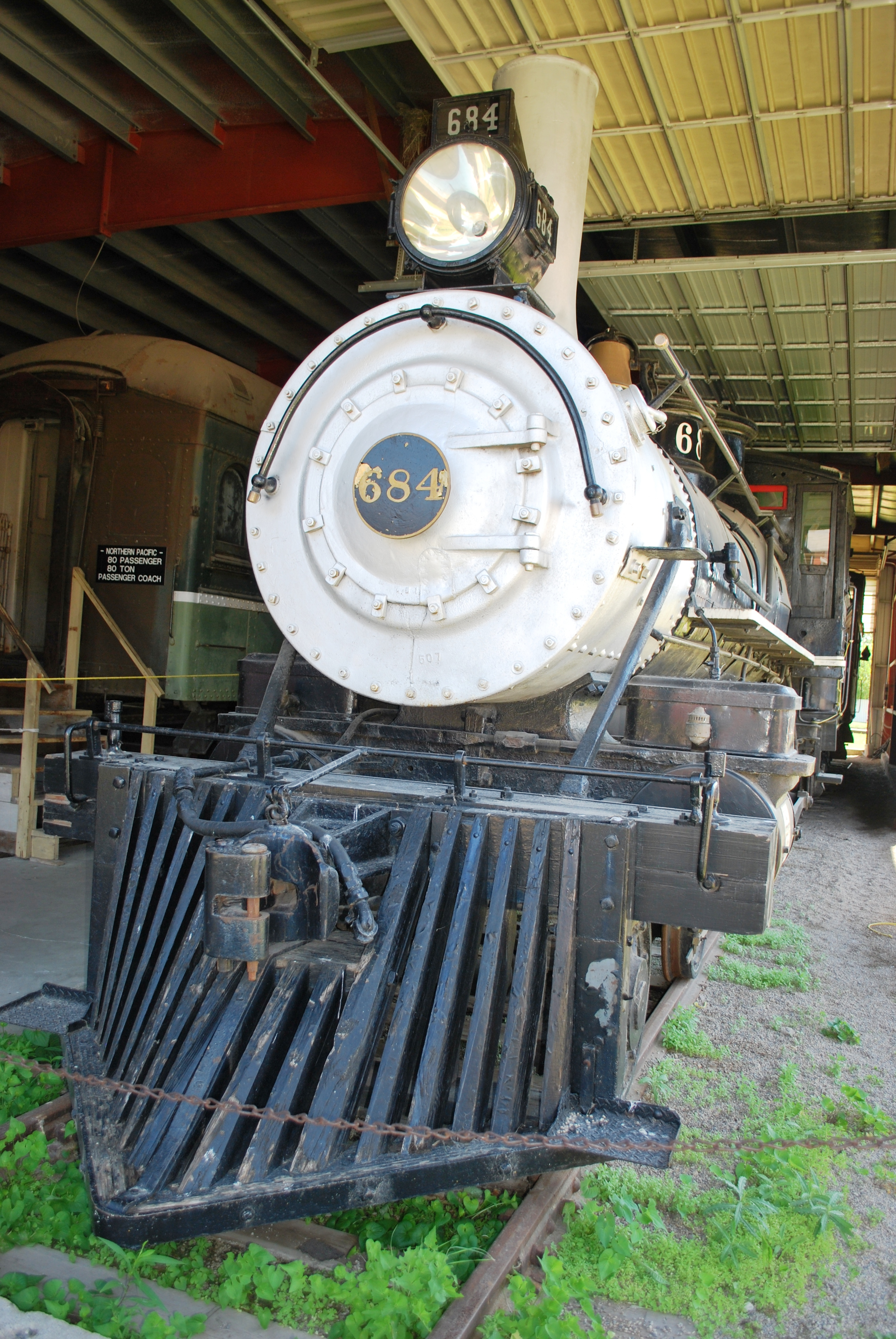

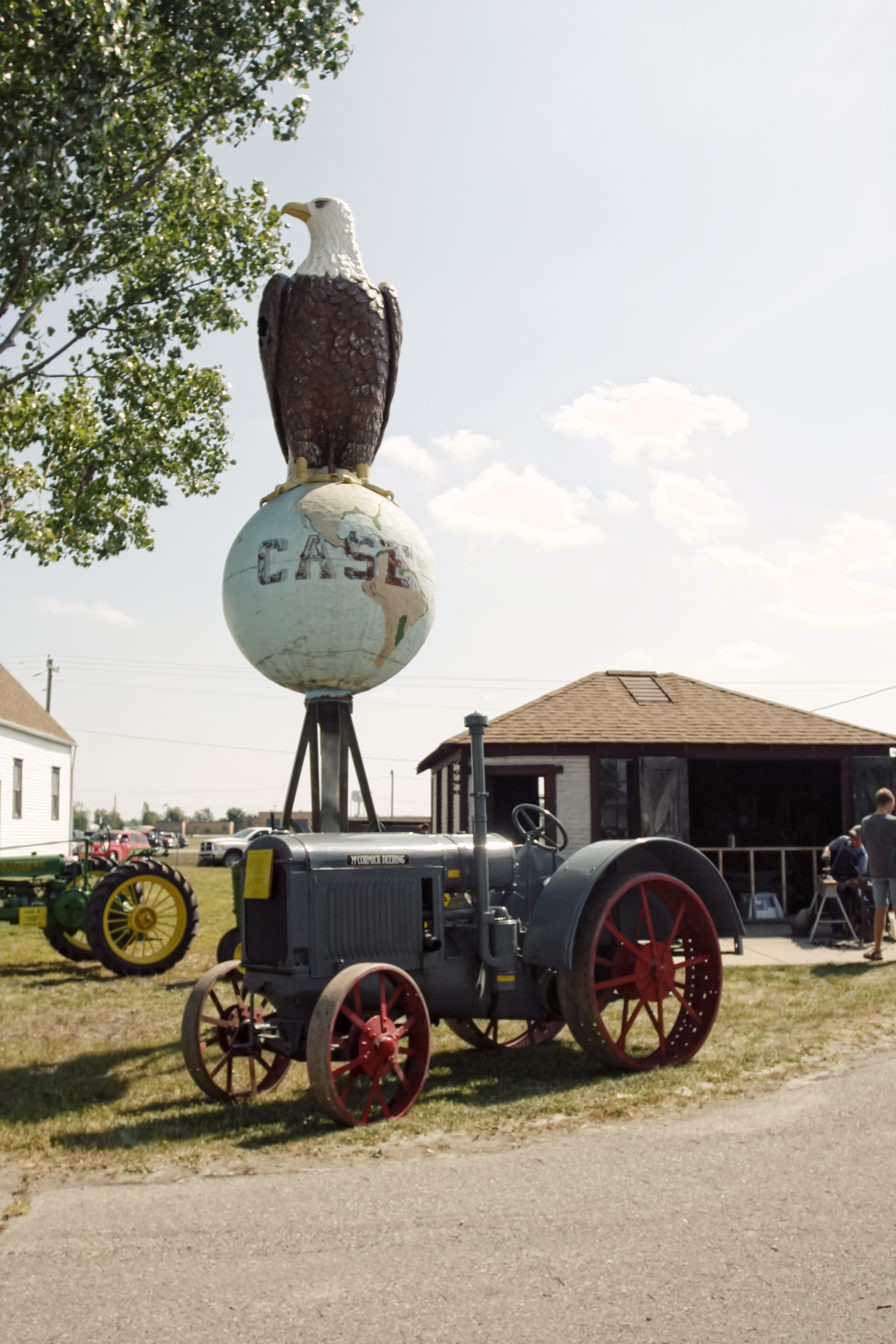

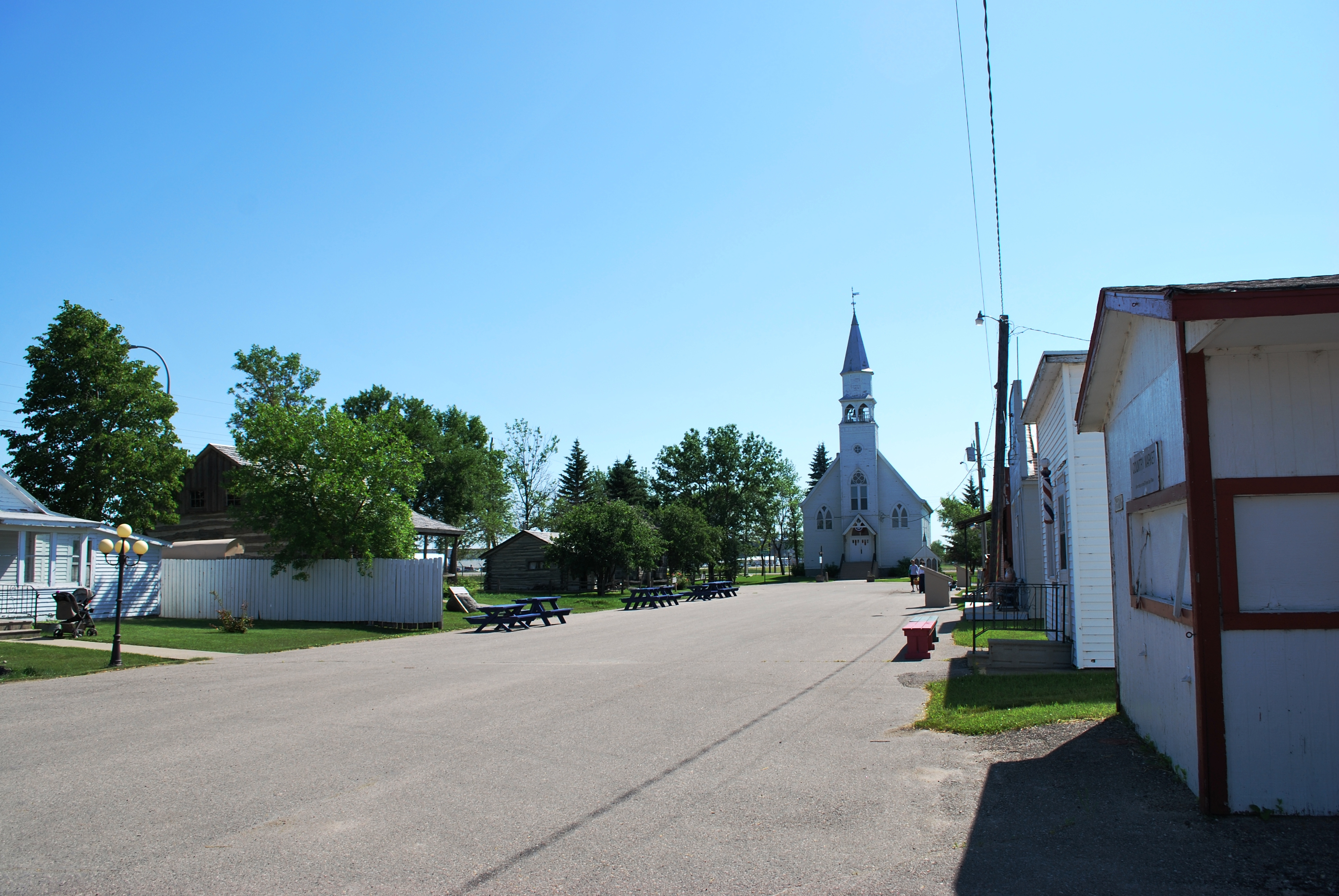

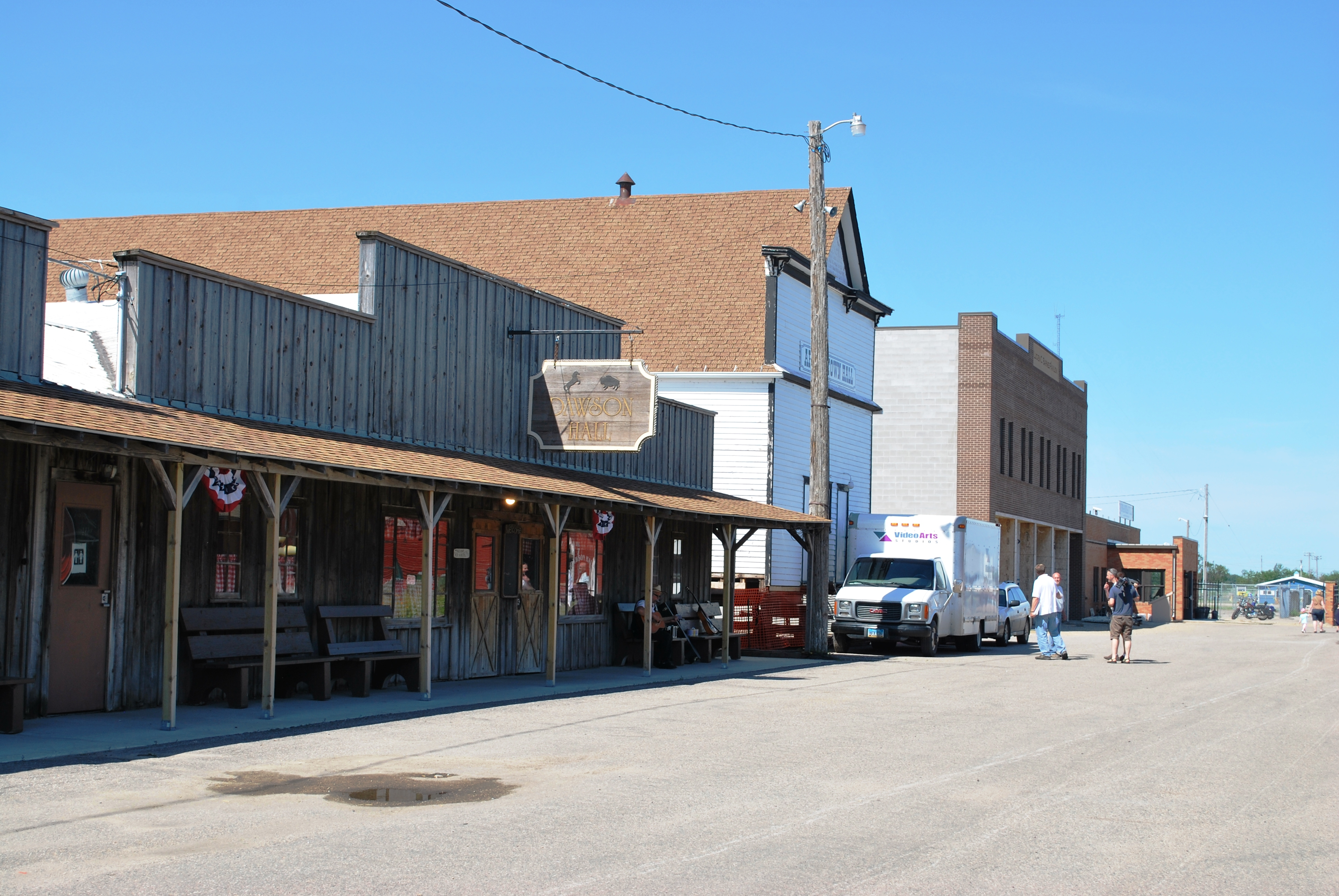

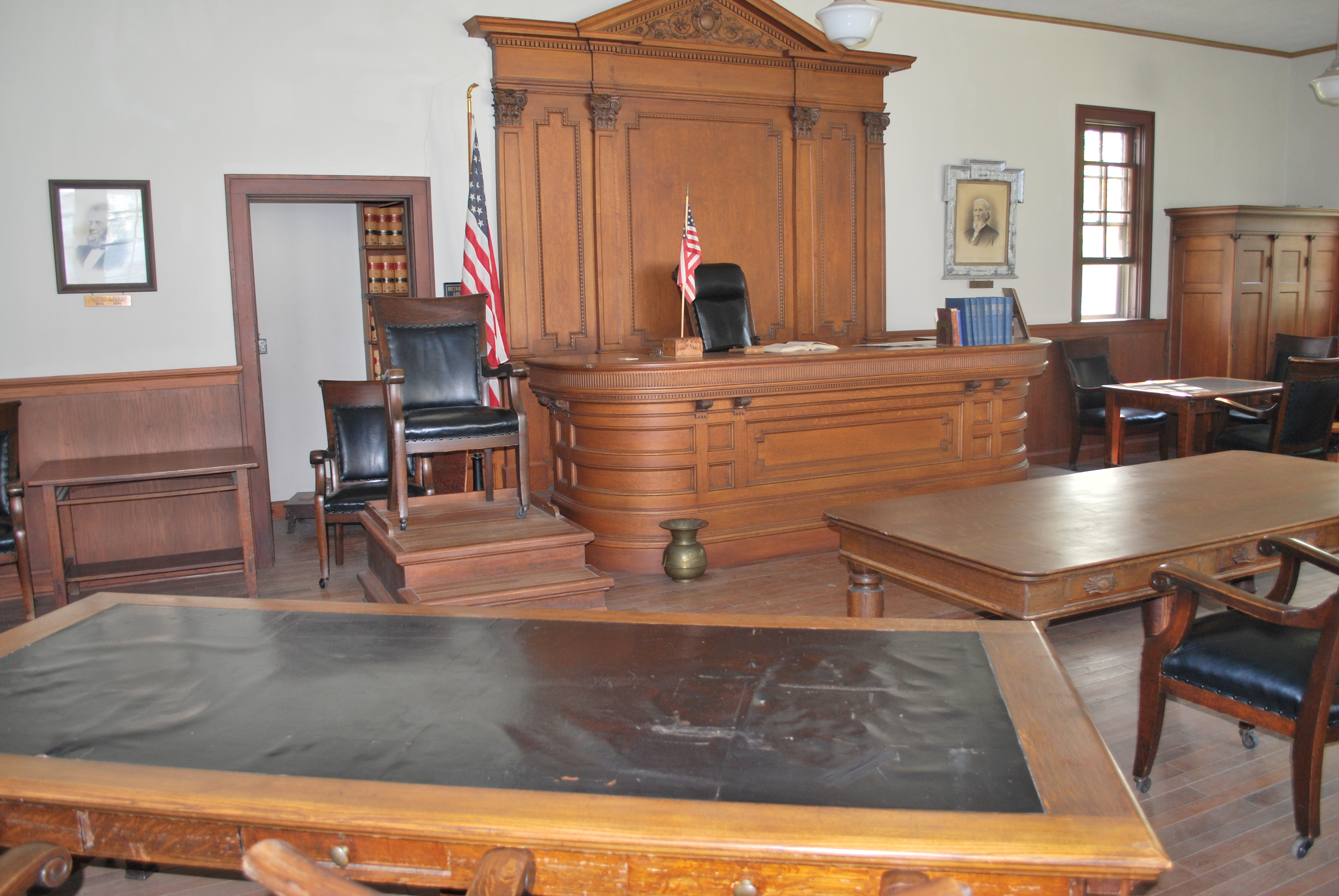
