= Driverless tractor =

Autonomous farm vehicle

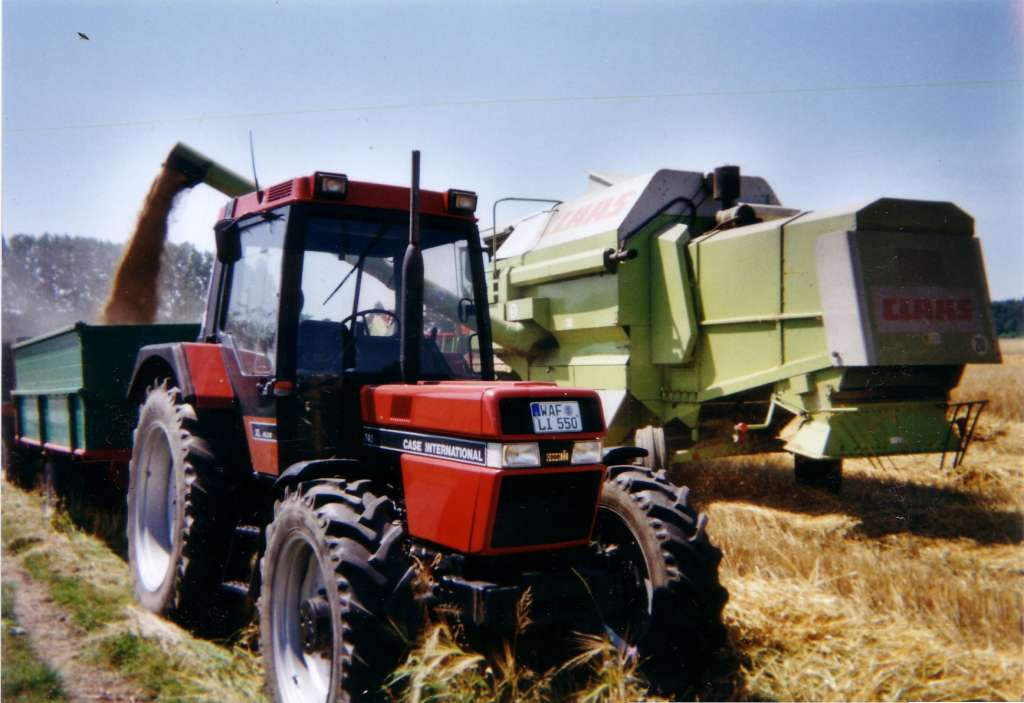
Case IH utilize "follow me" technology and vehicle-to-vehicle communication with a driverless tractor that follows one operated by a person.

A driverless tractor is an autonomous farm vehicle that delivers a high tractive effort (or torque) at slow speeds for the purposes of tillage and other agricultural tasks. It is considered driverless because it operates without the presence of a human inside the tractor itself. Like other unmanned ground vehicles, they are programmed to independently observe their position, decide speed, and avoid obstacles such as people, animals, or objects in the field while performing their task. The various driverless tractors are split into full autonomous technology and supervised autonomy. The idea of the driverless tractor appears as early as 1940, but the concept has significantly evolved in the last few years. The tractors use GPS and other wireless technologies to farm land without requiring a driver. Instead, they operate with the aid of a supervisor monitoring the progress at a control station or with a manned tractor in lead.

== History ==
The idea of a driverless tractor has been around since as early as 1940, when Frank W. Andrew invented his own. To guide his driverless tractor, a barrel or fixed wheel would be put in the center of the field and around it would wind a cable attached to a steering arm on the front of the tractor. In the 1950s, Ford developed a driverless tractor that they called "The Sniffer", but it was never produced because it could not be operated without running wire underground through the field. There were no major advances in driverless tractor technologies until 1994, when engineers at the Silsoe Research Institute developed the picture analysis system, which was used to guide a small driverless tractor designed for vegetable and root crops. This new tractor could also handle slight headland turns.

Current driverless tractor technologies build on recent developments in unmanned vehicles and agricultural technology. A tractor is defined as a powerful motor-driven vehicle with large, heavy treads, used for pulling farm machinery and other vehicles. Most commonly, the term is used to describe a farm vehicle that provides the power and traction to mechanize agricultural tasks. Precision agriculture was a major shift in technology that occurred in the 1980s. The result was tractors that farmers drove with the aid of GPS devices and on-board computers. Precision agriculture focuses on maximizing returns while using minimum resources. With the aid of GPS devices and computers, farmers could use tractors more efficiently.

Around 2011, engineers worked on semi-automated tractors. These tractors had drivers, but the drivers only had to steer at the end of each row. Subsequently, the idea of a driverless tractor emerged in 2011 and 2012.

Driverless tractors were initially created to follow a main tractor (with a driver). This would allow one driver to do twice as much work using what is called "follow-me" technology. The driverless tractor would follow a lead tractor between fields just like a hired hand would. As of 2008, however, driverless tractor technologies have moved toward autonomy, or independent functioning.

== Technology ==
The driverless tractor is part of a move to increase automation in farming. Other such autonomous technologies currently utilized in farming include automatic milking and automatic strawberry pickers. Developing such a technology is difficult. In order for it to be successful, the tractor must be able to follow deterministic tasks (a task that is defined before it starts, such as a path to follow on a field), have reactive behavior (the ability to react to an unknown situation such as an obstacle in the way), and have reflexive responses (making a decision without hesitation or time-consuming calculations such as changing the steering angle if necessary). Ultimately, the tractor should imitate a human in its ability to observe spatial position and make decisions such as speed.

=== How the technology works ===
The technology for the driverless tractor has been evolving since its beginnings in the 1940s. There are now several different approaches to building and programming the tractors.

==== Full autonomy ====
Currently, the majority of fully autonomous tractors navigate using lasers that bounce signals off several mobile transponders located around the field. These lasers are accompanied with 150 MHz radios to deal with line-of-sight issues. Instead of drivers, the tractors have controllers. Controllers are people that supervise the tractors without being inside them. These controllers can supervise multiple tractors on multiple fields from one location.

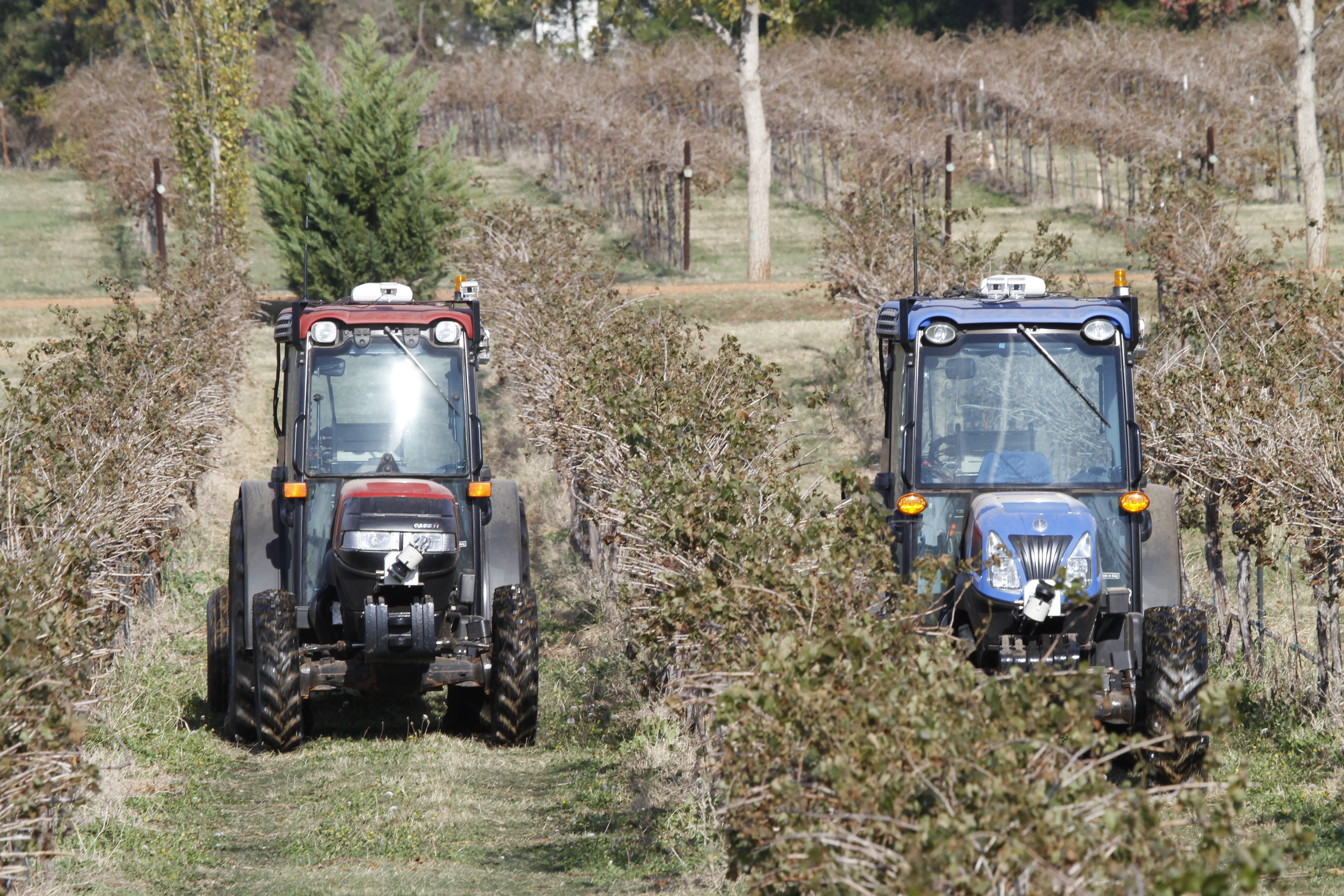
Driverless compact tractors perform fully autonomous spraying tasks at a Texas vineyard.

Another fully autonomous tractor technology involves using the native electrical (or CAN bus) system of the tractor or farm equipment to send commands. Using GPS positioning and radio feedback, automation software manages the vehicle's path and controls farming implements. A retrofit radio receiver and on-board computer are generally used to receive commands from the remote command station and translate it into vehicle commands such as steering, acceleration, braking, transmission, and implement control. Sensor technologies such as lidar improve safety by detecting and reacting to unforeseen obstacles.

At the 2022 Consumer Electronics Show, tractor manufacturer, John Deere announced the development of the first autonomous tractor designed to operate without a driver in the cab. The equipment will be added to the 8R 410 tractor and will include a total of 12 stereo cameras and an Nvidia GPU that can be controlled from a smartphone.

==== Supervised autonomy ====
Tractors that function with supervised autonomy (automated technology, but with a supervising operator present) use vehicle-to-vehicle (V2V) technology and communication. There is a wireless connection between the two tractors to exchange and share data. The leading tractor (with an operator) determines speed and direction which is then transmitted to the driverless tractor to imitate.

== Safety ==
The driverless tractor is considered controversial in terms of safety and public acceptance. A tractor operating without a driver makes some people nervous. Creating technology that stays safe in all scenarios where failure could possibly occur takes a lot of programming and time. In terms of motion detection, the tractors have sensors to stop them if they detect objects in their path such as people, animals, vehicles or other large objects.

== Manufacturers ==
There are several primary manufacturers that have been actively seeking to produce a marketable driverless tractor and have made strides toward substantial prototypes and mass production of their products. Current leading manufacturers are John Deere, Autonomous Tractor Corporation, Fendt and Case IH.

=== John Deere ===
John Deere has had a strong influence on the development of automated farming technology. In early 2008, Deere and Company launched its ITEC Pro guidance product, an automated system based on global positioning technology which automates vehicle functions including end turns. John Deere currently has a prototype in development. Rather than the use of lasers, the tractor uses two 6-inch dome antennas that receive signals from a global positioning satellite. Based on these satellite signals, the tractor follows a previously programmed route via an electronic map. These antenna are also for human operators to control the tractor if satellite signals have trouble penetrating buildings or heavy vegetation.

=== Autonomous Tractor Corporation ===
In January 2012, Terry Anderson established a company called Autonomous Tractor Corporation (ATC) located in North Dakota. The SPIRIT driverless tractor is a product of ATC. Anderson thought tractors were getting bigger and more expensive while not improving in quality. The tractors Anderson helped create were initially made to follow a main tractor (that has a driver) but are now moving towards independent functioning. Anderson initially tested half-scale models of his automated tractor. He presented his model at the Big Iron Farm Show in September 2012. Anderson stated that his goal is to build 25 units of his automated tractor in 2013 and sell them at a discount price for farmers to test.

=== Fendt ===
Fendt, part of the AGCO corporation, has also been working on a driverless tractor. In 2011 in Hanover at the Agritechnica show, Fendt presented their driverless tractor model called the GuideConnect. The GuideConnect is a tractor programmed to mirror the movements of another tractor. An operator-driven tractor maneuvers through a field or through crops and is followed by a driverless tractor. The driver-controlled leading tractor can avoid obstacles with the driverless tractor following its path. Instead of focusing on a completely independent piece of technology, Fendt made GuideConnect to work together with operator-controlled machinery. GuideConnect is connected by satellite navigation and radio to the operator-driven tractor.

=== Case IH ===
Case IH is a company created by the merging of J.I. Case Company and International Harvester. The company now operates under CNH Global, but the tractors are still branded Case IH. The driverless tractors produced by Case IH are referred to as "supervised autonomy." A tractor driven by a person is followed by autonomous machinery which copies the steering and speed of the former tractor. There is an initial driver, but the autonomous technology is present in the second tractor. The two machines operate with V2V technology, which is vehicle-to-vehicle communication. In 2016, Case unveiled their latest autonomous concept, a cabless row crop tractor of the Magnum model that could operate autonomously.

== Tractor upgrade kits ==
Autonomous steering systems can also be added to non-driverless tractors to make them driverless.

Bear Flag Robotics

Bear Flag Robotics builds autonomous technology for farm tractors. The business model is to procure the machines from the OEMS (John Deere, Case New Holland, Agco), outfit them with sensors, actuators and compute and then provide them to growers.

== See also ==
- Agricultural robot
- Agricultural machinery
- Precision agriculture
- Electric vehicle
