= Jud, North Dakota =

- City
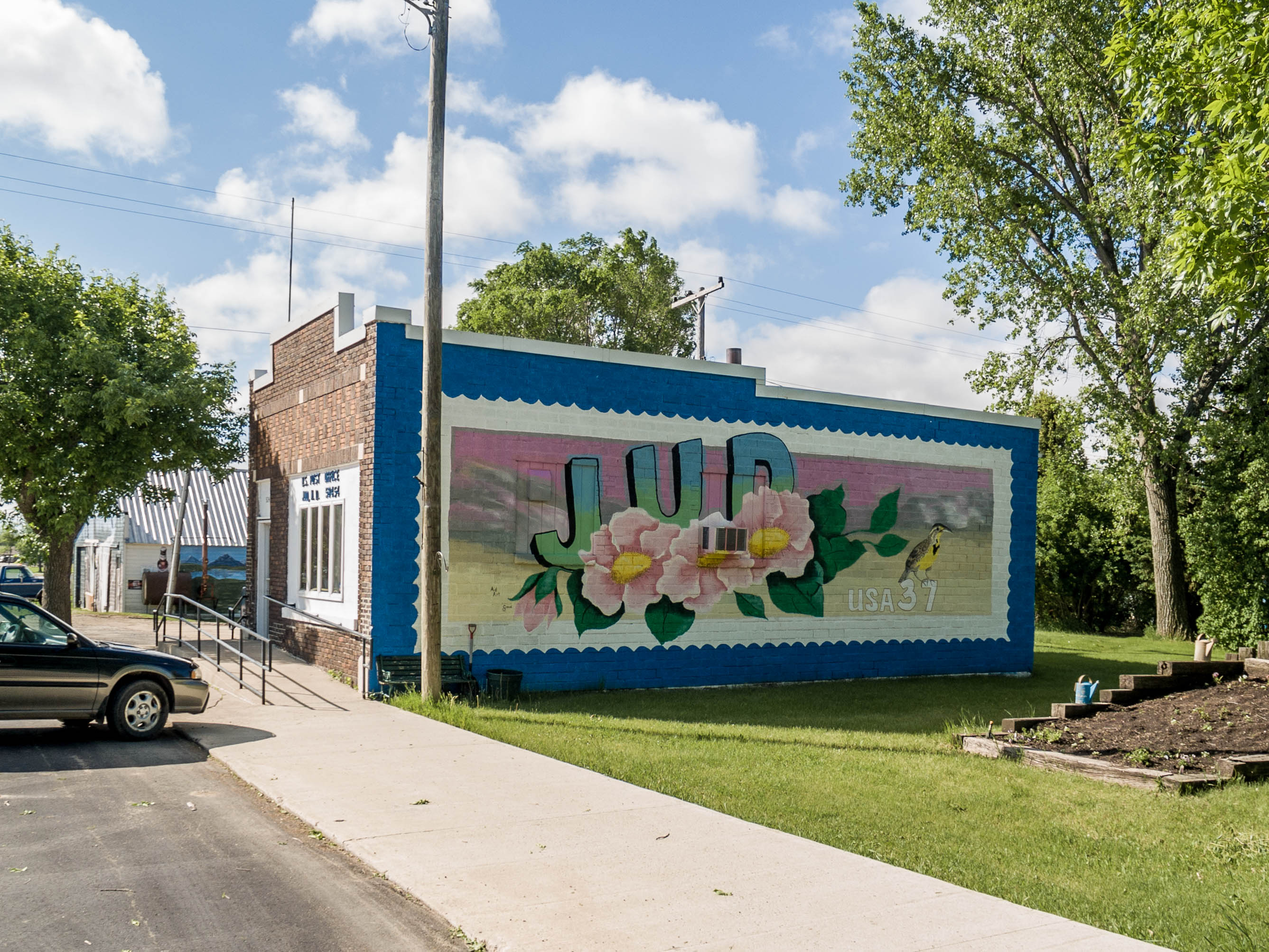
- Post office in Jud

- Location of Jud, North Dakota
- Coordinates: 46°31′30″N 98°53′53″W
- Country: United States
- State: North Dakota
- County: LaMoure
- Founded: 1904

Area
  - Total: 0.24 sq mi (0.63 km^{2})
  - Land: 0.24 sq mi (0.63 km^{2})
  - Water: 0 sq mi (0.00 km^{2})
- Elevation: 1,740 ft (530 m)

Population (2020)
  - Total: 65
  - Estimate (2024): 65
  - Density: 267.1/sq mi (103.14/km^{2})
- Time zone: UTC–6 (Central (CST))
  - Summer (DST): UTC–5 (CDT)
- ZIP Code: 58454
- Area code: 701
- FIPS code: 38-41180
- GNIS feature ID: 1033647

Jud is a rural city in LaMoure County, North Dakota, United States. The population was 65 at the 2020 census. Located in Bluebird Township, the town was founded in 1904 as "Fox" and the post office was established as "Gunthorpe." On October 4, 1906, the town and post office were renamed Jud for the county's namesake, Judson LaMoure. Once located on a branch of the Northern Pacific Railroad, Jud today is located along unpaved 61st Street SE, 9 miles (14 km) west of U.S. Route 281 and 25 miles (40 km) south of Interstate 94 in the midst of settled farmland and open plains.

== Geography ==
Jud is geographically located at 46°31′30″N 98°53′53″W (46.524984, -98.898191).

According to the United States Census Bureau, the city has a total area of 0.25 square miles (0.65 km^{2}), all land.

== Demographics ==
Historical population
Census	Pop.	Note	%±
1910	99		—
1920	178		79.8%
1930	140		−21.3%
1940	202		44.3%
1950	175		−13.4%
1960	156		−10.9%
1970	110		−29.5%
1980	118		7.3%
1990	84		−28.8%
2000	76		−9.5%
2010	72		−5.3%
2020	65		−9.7%
2024 (est.)	65		0.0%
U.S. Decennial Census; 2020 Census

=== 2010 census ===
As of the census of 2010, there were 72 people, 42 households, and 19 families residing in the city. The population density was 288.0 inhabitants per square mile (111.2/km^{2}). There were 50 housing units at an average density of 200.0 per square mile (77.2/km^{2}). The racial makeup of the city was 97.2% White and 2.8% from two or more races.

There were 42 households, of which 11.9% had children under the age of 18 living with them, 40.5% were married couples living together, 2.4% had a female householder with no husband present, 2.4% had a male householder with no wife present, and 54.8% were non-families. 50.0% of all households were made up of individuals, and 23.8% had someone living alone who was 65 years of age or older. The average household size was 1.67 and the average family size was 2.32.

The median age in the city was 54 years. 9.7% of residents were under the age of 18; 4.3% were between the ages of 18 and 24; 16.7% were from 25 to 44; 45.8% were from 45 to 64; and 23.6% were 65 years of age or older. The gender makeup of the city was 50.0% male and 50.0% female.

=== 2000 census ===
As of the census of 2000, there were 76 people, 43 households, and 20 families residing in the city. The population density was 313.2 inhabitants per square mile (120.9/km^{2}). There were 51 housing units at an average density of 210.2 per square mile (81.2/km^{2}). The racial makeup of the city was 98.68% White and 1.32% Asian.

There were 43 households, out of which 14.0% had children under the age of 18 living with them, 39.5% were married couples living together, 7.0% had a female householder with no husband present, and 51.2% were non-families. 48.8% of all households were made up of individuals, and 32.6% had someone living alone who was 65 years of age or older. The average household size was 1.72 and the average family size was 2.29.

In the city, the population was spread out, with 11.8% under the age of 18, 26.3% from 25 to 44, 18.4% from 45 to 64, and 43.4% who were 65 years of age or older. The median age was 54 years. For every 100 females, there were 100.0 males. For every 100 females age 18 and over, there were 103.0 males.

The median income for a household in the city was $22,857, and the median income for a family was $34,375. Males had a median income of $36,250 versus $16,250 for females. The per capita income for the city was $17,095. There were no families and 22.2% of the population living below the poverty line, including no under eighteens and 18.8% of those over 64.

== Climate ==
This climatic region is typified by large seasonal temperature differences, with warm to hot (and often humid) summers and cold (sometimes severely cold) winters. According to the Köppen Climate Classification system, Jud has a humid continental climate, abbreviated "Dfb" on climate maps.

== See also ==
- Dagen's Grocery
