= Judson LaMoure =

American politician

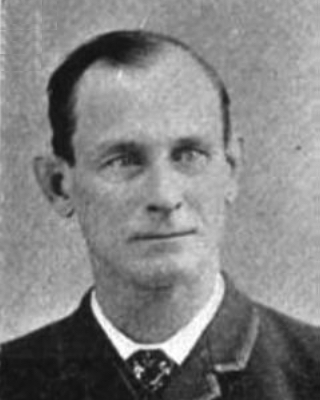

President pro tempore of the North Dakota Senate
- In office January 8, 1901 – January 6, 1903
- Preceded by: Alexander C. McGillivray
- Succeeded by: James B. Sharpe

Member of the North Dakota Senate from the 1st district
- In office November 19, 1889 – January 7, 1913
- Preceded by: None (office established)
- Succeeded by: Christian Ganssle

Personal details
- Born: March 27, 1839 Frelighsburg, Quebec, Canada
- Died: March 16, 1918 (aged 78) Stuart, Florida, U.S.
- Party: Republican
- Spouse: Minnie Ella Nelson (m. 1874)

Judson LaMoure (March 27, 1839 – March 16, 1918) was one of the first men to serve in the North Dakota state legislature; he served in the State Senate as a Republican. The state towns of Jud, Judson, and LaMoure along with LaMoure County were named after him.

Contrary to popular belief, the American author Louis L'Amour was of no relation to LaMoure despite both men being from North Dakota.

== Family ==
LaMoure was the son of John Edward LaMoure (1795-1869) and Lois Louisa (Perry) LaMoure (1805-1881) and was of French-Irish ancestry. He was the last of five children; his eldest brother Edward Byron LaMoure was killed during an Indian raid in Elk Point, Dakota Territory on August 9, 1865.

LaMoure married Minnie Ella Nelson on December 3, 1874. Together they had six children, of which only four survived to adulthood.

== Biography ==
LaMoure was born in Frelinghsburg, Lower Canada, on March 27, 1839; after two years at the local academy there he completed his education and immigrated to America.

He came to Davenport, Iowa, on March 2, 1859, in 1860 he joined a rush of gold-seekers to Pike's Peak but turned back east during the Fall of that year without striking gold.

In 1862 he settled in Elk Point, Dakota Territory, while there LaMoure was engaged in a Transportation business with H. D. Booge & Co.; he became familiar with the Brulé Sioux and received an appointment as their sub-agent in 1865.

In 1870 LaMoure gave up his connection to the Sioux and relocated to Pembina County, Dakota Territory, where he became a merchant in Neche, a business he continued for many years. Prior to 1872 he was elected into the Upper House of Dakota Legislature but declined to take his seat due to his mercantile interests.

He was first elected into the Territorial Assembly in 1872, and had served in this position for the years of 1873, 1877, 1881, and 1883 afterwards. In 1876 he was elected into the Council, in 1880 to the Territorial House, and in 1889 to the State Senate which he was re-elected in during every succeeding election before he retired in 1913.

In 1873, LaMoure led a rescue party into a horrific blizzard to find and save a group of laundry women and small children accidentally left behind by George Armstrong Custer when the 7th Cavalry apparently got lost in a whiteout.

In 1893, during the attempt to properly identify and maintain the Pembina Metis Cemetery early on, LaMoure sponsored an appropriation bill for $500 through the North Dakota State Legislature to purchase and maintain the site. Unfortunately, it was never implemented and the site fell into the hands of a private landowner.

During his last years, LaMoure spent his winters in Stuart, Florida, where he died on March 16, 1918.
