= West Fargo, North Dakota =

- City
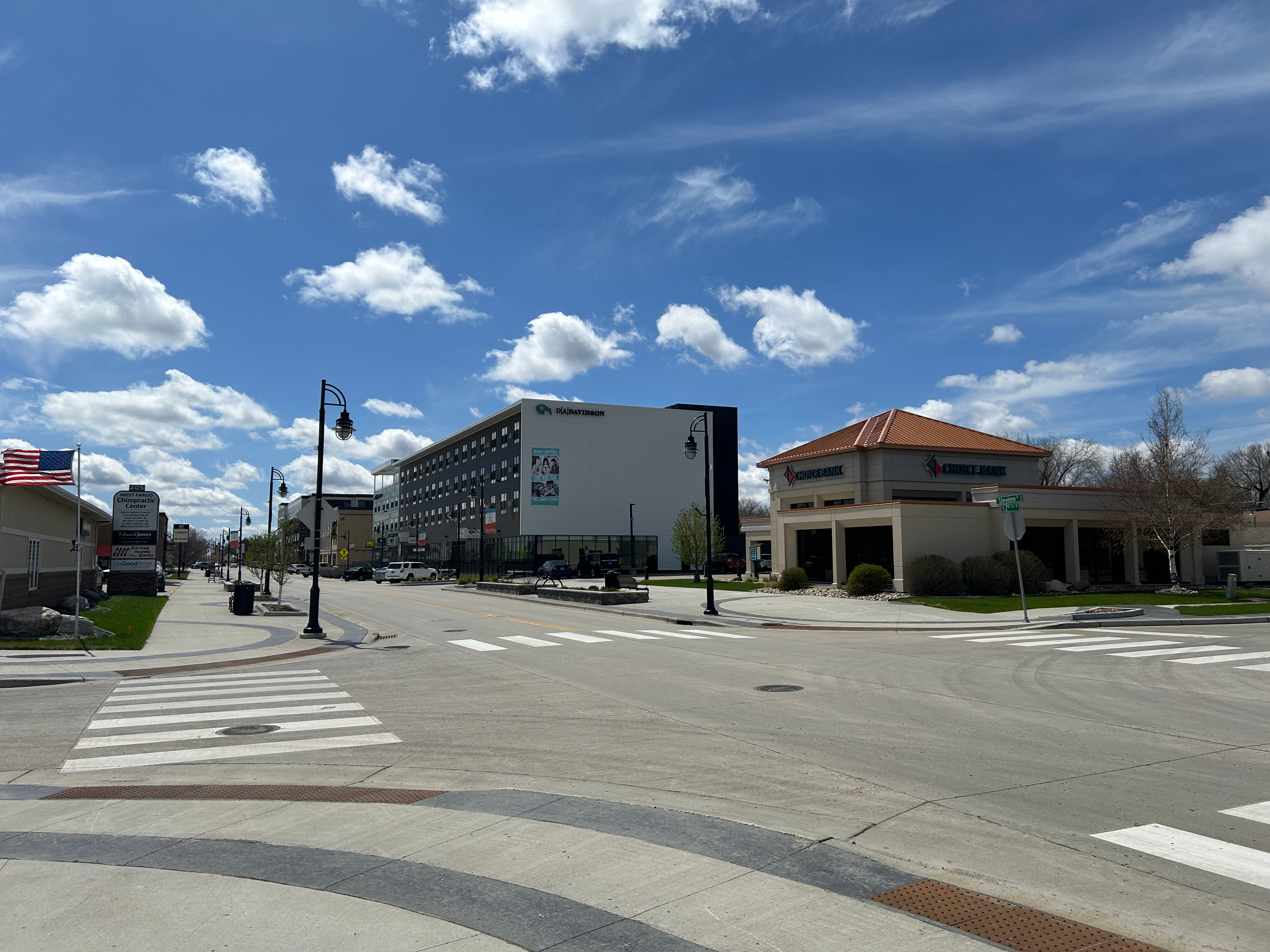
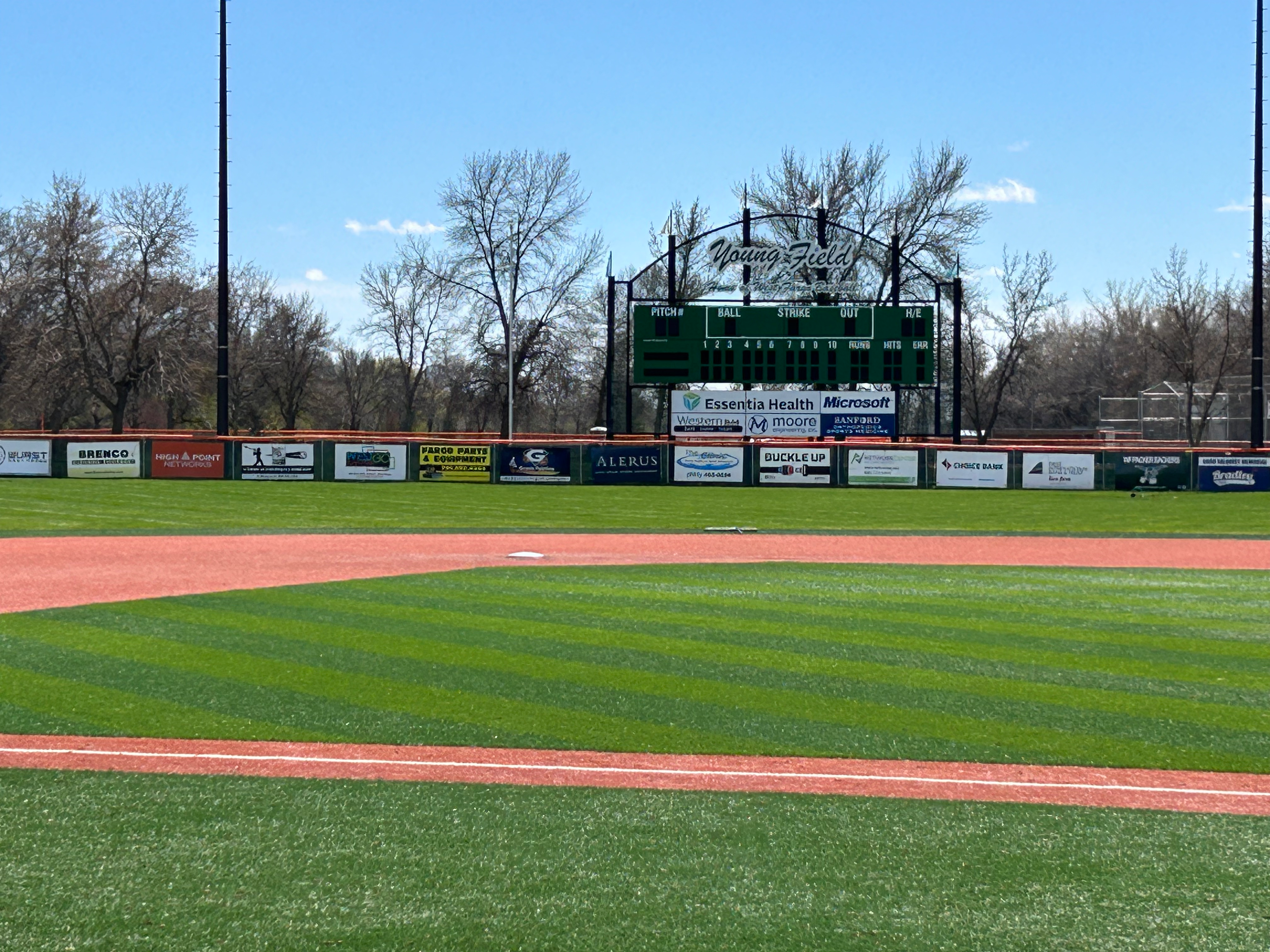
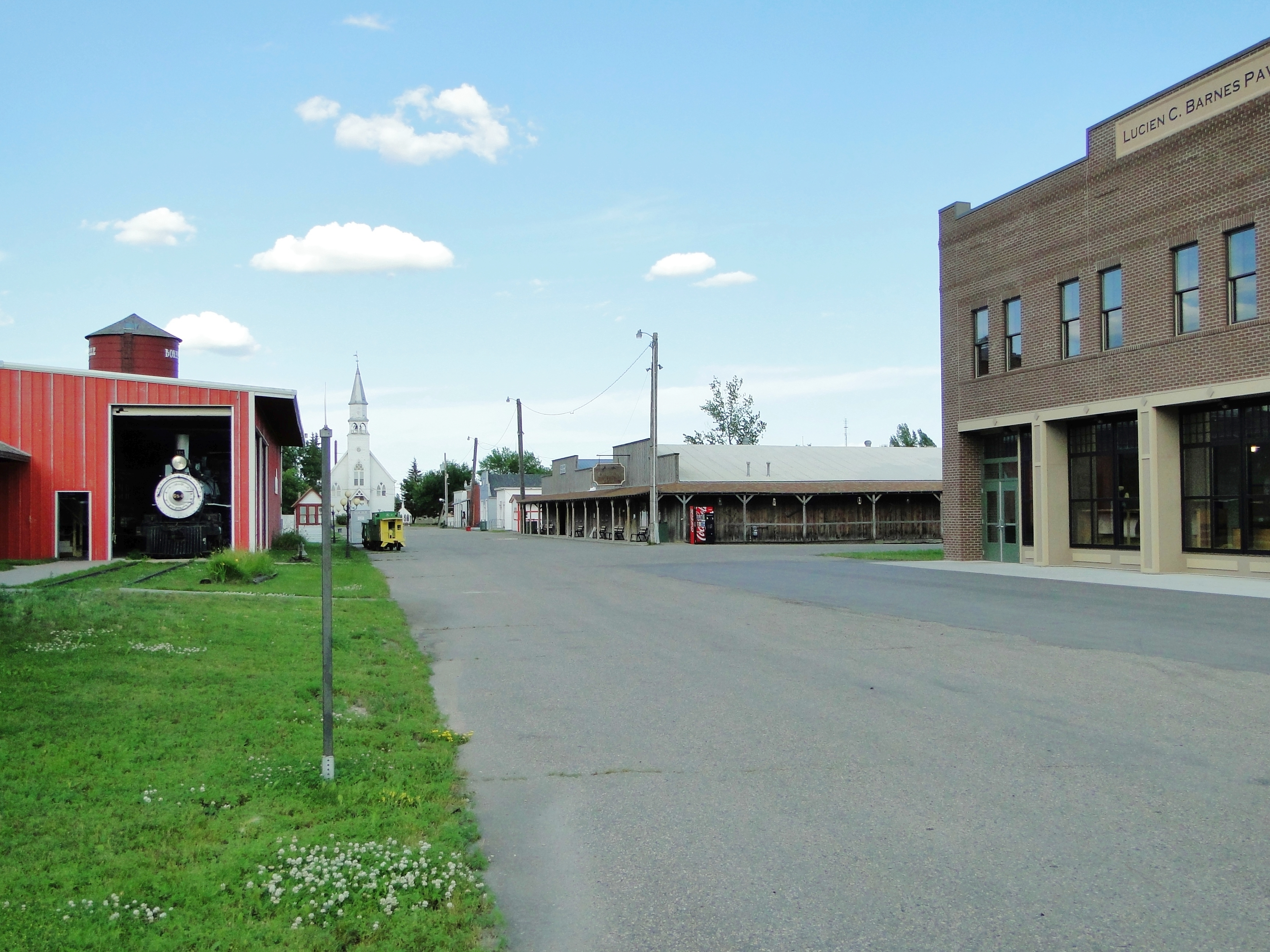
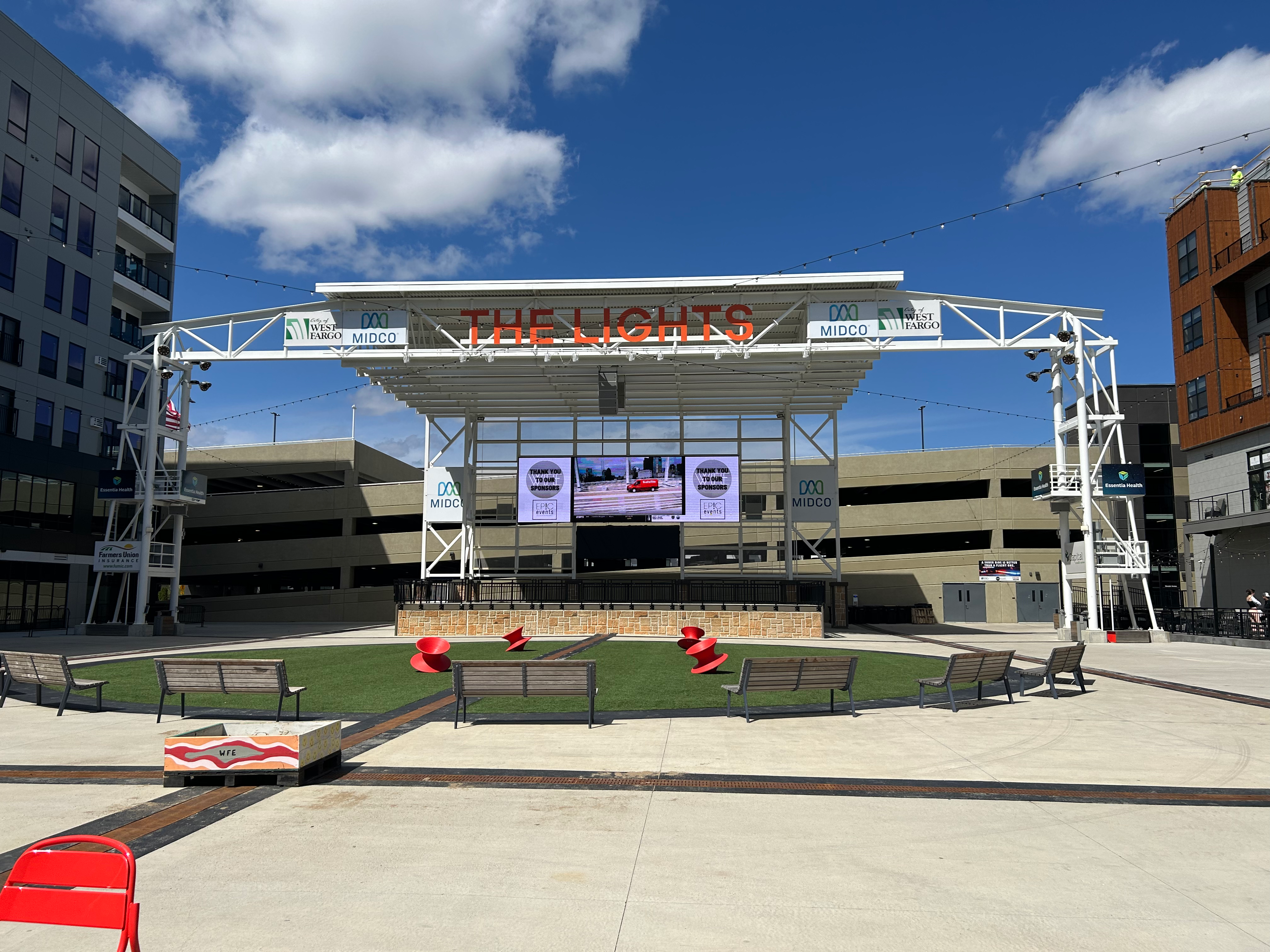
- Downtown West Fargo Young Field Bonanzaville, USA MIDCO Stage at the Essentia Health Plaza

- Flag Logo
- Motto: "A City on the Grow"
- Interactive map of West Fargo, North Dakota
- Location within North Dakota Location within the United States
- Coordinates: 46.856380°N 96.904809°W
- Country: United States
- State: North Dakota
- County: Cass
- Founded: 1871
- Incorporated (village): November 1930 as of South West Fargo
- Incorporated (village): February 15, 1937 as of Southwest Fargo
- Incorporated (city): June 7, 1967 as of West Fargo
- Founder: John E. Haggart

Government
  - Type: City Commission
  - Mayor: Bernie Dardis
  - City Administrator: Dustin Scott
  - Commissioners: Brad Olson; Roben Anderson; Amy Zundel; Rory Jorgensen

Area
  - City: 16.417 sq mi (42.520 km^{2})
  - Land: 16.175 sq mi (41.893 km^{2})
  - Water: 0.242 sq mi (0.627 km^{2}) 1.47%
- Elevation: 899 ft (274 m)

Population (2020)
  - City: 38,626
  - Estimate (2024): 41,027
  - Rank: US: 994th ND: 5th
  - Density: 2,388.0/sq mi (922.02/km^{2})
  - Urban: 216,214 (US: 177th)
  - Urban density: 2,780/sq mi (1,074/km^{2})
  - Metro: 267,793 (US: 187th)
  - Metro density: 95.3/sq mi (36.79/km^{2})
  - Combined: 290,719 (US: 120th)
  - Combined density: 58.2/sq mi (22.46/km^{2})
- Demonym: West Fargoan
- Time zone: UTC−6 (Central (CST))
  - Summer (DST): UTC−5 (CDT)
- ZIP Code: 58078
- Area code: 701
- FIPS code: 38-84780
- GNIS feature ID: 1036321
- Highways: I-94, US 10, US 52
- Website: westfargond.gov

West Fargo is a city in Cass County, North Dakota, United States. West Fargo is classified as the western neighboring city of Fargo. The population was 38,626 at the 2020 census, and was estimated at 41,027 in 2024, making it the fifth-most populous city in North Dakota. It is part of the Fargo–Moorhead, ND-MN metropolitan area. It is one of the state's fastest growing cities.

== History ==
West Fargo began as a whistle stop called "Sheyenne Crossing" on the Northern Pacific Railway, named for the nearby Sheyenne River.

A post office operated from 1874 to 1885.

The settlement was renamed "Haggartville", and then "Haggart", after the owner of the land, John E. Haggart, a businessman who served as postmaster, U.S. Marshall, and first sheriff of Cass County. Settlers began arriving in the area, and in 1876 the first school was built, School District No. 6.

Equity Co-op Packing Company was formed by a group of farmers, and the Equity Packing Plant—a meat processing plant—was erected in the settlement in 1919. Twenty-four homes were built, as well as a hotel, restaurant, and general store. The Equity company fell into bankruptcy in 1922, and was sold to Armour and Company in 1925, when the settlement's name was changed to "Village of West Fargo". The settlement was a major agricultural processor during the 1930s, and most of the residents were meat packinghouse workers; teams at West Fargo High School continue to be called the "packers". The plant utilized an assembly line to process meat, and its motto stated it used "every part of the animal except the squeal." The plant also produced fertilizer, adhesives, and soap. The meat packing era ended in West Fargo when the Armour plant closed in 1960.

In 1989, the cities of West Fargo and Riverside merged.

== Geography ==
According to the United States Census Bureau, the city has a total area of 16.417 square miles (42.52 km^{2}), of which 16.175 square miles (41.89 km^{2}) is land and 0.242 square miles (0.63 km^{2}) (1.47%) is water.

=== Climate ===
This climatic region is typified by large seasonal temperature differences, with warm (and often humid) summers and cold (sometimes severely cold) winters. According to the Köppen Climate Classification system, West Fargo has a humid continental climate, abbreviated "Dfb" on climate maps.

Climate data for West Fargo, ND (3.8 mi SSE), (1991-2020)
Month	Jan	Feb	Mar	Apr	May	Jun	Jul	Aug	Sep	Oct	Nov	Dec	Year
Average precipitation inches (mm)	0.65 (17)	0.66 (17)	1.08 (27)	1.71 (43)	3.21 (82)	4.45 (113)	3.67 (93)	2.78 (71)	2.73 (69)	2.28 (58)	0.86 (22)	0.89 (23)	24.97 (635)
Source: NOAA

== Demographics ==
Historical population
Census	Pop.	Note	%±
1940	707		—
1950	1,632		130.8%
1960	3,328		103.9%
1970	5,161		55.1%
1980	10,099		95.7%
1990	12,287		21.7%
2000	14,940		21.6%
2010	25,830		72.9%
2020	38,626		49.5%
2024 (est.)	41,027		6.2%
U.S. Decennial Census; 2020 Census

According to realtor website Zillow, the average price of a home as of February 28, 2026, in West Fargo is $348,706.

As of the 2024 American Community Survey, there are 15,841 estimated households in West Fargo with an average of 2.52 persons per household. The city has a median household income of $90,665. Approximately 8.8% of the city's population lives at or below the poverty line. West Fargo has an estimated 76.0% employment rate, with 42.1% of the population holding a bachelor's degree or higher and 97.0% holding a high school diploma. There were 16,560 housing units at an average density of 1,023.80 per square mile (395.3/km^{2}).

The top five reported languages (people were allowed to report up to two languages, thus the figures will generally add to more than 100%) were English (94.1%), Spanish (0.6%), Indo-European (3.2%), Asian and Pacific Islander (1.2%), and Other (0.9%).

=== Racial and ethnic composition ===
West Fargo, North Dakota – racial and ethnic composition Note: the US Census treats Hispanic/Latino as an ethnic category. This table excludes Latinos from the racial categories and assigns them to a separate category. Hispanics/Latinos may be of any race.
Race / ethnicity (NH = non-Hispanic)	Pop. 1980	Pop. 1990	Pop. 2000	Pop. 2010	Pop. 2020	Pop. 2024
White alone (NH)	9,919 (98.22%)	12,057 (98.13%)	14,312 (95.80%)	23,840 (92.30%)	32,687 (84.62%)	34,093 (83.1%)
Black or African American alone (NH)	0 (0.00%)	12 (0.10%)	59 (0.39%)	503 (1.95%)	1,779 (4.61%)	—
Native American or Alaska Native alone (NH)	91 (0.90%)	102 (0.83%)	151 (1.01%)	232 (0.90%)	415 (1.07%)	—
Asian alone (NH)	53 (0.52%)	23 (0.19%)	41 (0.27%)	359 (1.39%)	850 (2.20%)	—
Pacific Islander alone (NH)	—	—	3 (0.02%)	6 (0.02%)	5 (0.01%)	—
Other race alone (NH)	2 (0.02%)	5 (0.04%)	7 (0.05%)	26 (0.10%)	79 (0.20%)	—
Mixed race or multiracial (NH)	—	—	156 (1.04%)	391 (1.51%)	1,616 (4.18%)	—
Hispanic or Latino (any race)	35 (0.35%)	88 (0.72%)	211 (1.41%)	473 (1.83%)	1,195 (3.09%)	1,559 (3.8%)
Total	10,099 (100.00%)	12,287 (100.00%)	14,940 (100.00%)	25,830 (100.00%)	38,626 (100.00%)	41,027 (100.0%)

=== 2024 estimate ===
As of the 2024 estimate, there were 41,027 people, 15,841 households, and _ families residing in the city. The population density was 2,536.45 inhabitants per square mile (979.3/km^{2}). There were 16,560 housing units at an average density of 1,023.80 per square mile (395.3/km^{2}). The racial makeup of the county was 85.2% White (83.1% NH White), 5.2% African American, 1.3% Native American, 2.0% Asian, 0.0% Pacific Islander, _% from some other races and 5.6% from two or more races. Hispanic or Latino people of any race were 3.8% of the population.

=== 2020 census ===
As of the 2020 census, West Fargo had a population of 38,626. The median age was 33.8 years. 27.4% of residents were under the age of 18 and 10.5% of residents were 65 years of age or older. For every 100 females there were 99.5 males, and for every 100 females age 18 and over there were 98.1 males age 18 and over.

100.0% of residents lived in urban areas, while 0.0% lived in rural areas.

There were 15,271 households in West Fargo, of which 36.3% had children under the age of 18 living in them. Of all households, 51.1% were married-couple households, 18.4% were households with a male householder and no spouse or partner present, and 22.0% were households with a female householder and no spouse or partner present. About 26.5% of all households were made up of individuals and 7.6% had someone living alone who was 65 years of age or older. There were 9,905 families in the city.

There were 16,058 housing units, of which 4.9% were vacant. The homeowner vacancy rate was 1.3% and the rental vacancy rate was 7.3%. The population density was 2,404.66 inhabitants per square mile (928.4/km^{2}), and housing units averaged 999.69 per square mile (386.0/km^{2}).

Racial composition as of the 2020 census
Race	Number	Percent
White	33,062	85.6%
Black or African American	1,824	4.7%
American Indian and Alaska Native	464	1.2%
Asian	858	2.2%
Native Hawaiian and Other Pacific Islander	6	0.0%
Some other race	379	1.0%
Two or more races	2,033	5.3%
Hispanic or Latino (of any race)	1,195	3.1%

=== 2010 census ===
As of the 2010 census, there were 25,830 people, 10,348 households and 6,823 families residing in the city. The population density was 1,788.91 inhabitants per square mile (690.7/km^{2}). There were 10,760 housing units at an average density of 745.20 per square mile (287.7/km^{2}). The racial makeup of the city was 93.51% White, 1.99% African American, 0.95% Native American, 1.40% Asian, 0.02% Pacific Islander, 0.36% from some other races and 1.76% from two or more races. Hispanic or Latino people of any race were 1.83% of the population.

According to the 2008–2012 American Community Survey 5-Year Estimates, the ancestry is as follows:

- German 46.2%
- Norwegian 35.4%
- Irish 7.6%
- Swedish 6.2%
- English 5.4%
- French (except Basque) 3.8%
- American 2.7%
- Polish 2.6%
- Russian 2.5%
- Czech 2.4%
- Subsaharan African 2.2%
- Italian 1.7%
- Scottish 1.3%
- Danish 1.2%

There were 10,348 households, of which 36.2% had children under the age of 18 living with them, 52.8% were married couples living together, 9.1% had a female householder with no husband present, 4.0% had a male householder with no wife present, and 34.1% were non-families. 26.4% of all households were made up of individuals, and 6.6% had someone living alone who was 65 years of age or older. The average household size was 2.49 and the average family size was 3.04.

The median age was 32.6 years. 26.9% of residents were under the age of 18; 9.3% were between the ages of 18 and 24; 32.9% were from 25 to 44; 23.2% were from 45 to 64; and 7.8% were 65 years of age or older. The gender makeup of the city was 49.6% male and 50.4% female.

=== 2000 census ===
As of the 2000 census, there were 14,940 people, 5,771 households and 4,091 families residing in the city. The population density was 2,049.18 inhabitants per square mile (791.2/km^{2}). There were 5,968 housing units at an average density of 818.58 per square mile (316.1/km^{2}). The racial makeup of the city was 96.40% White, 0.42% African American, 1.04% Native American, 0.28% Asian, 0.02% Pacific Islander, 0.67% from some other races and 1.16% from two or more races. Hispanic or Latino people of any race were 1.41% of the population.

The top six ancestry groups in the city were German (47.9%), Norwegian (39.7%), Irish (8.3%), Swedish (7.2%), French (5.2%), English (4.8%).

There were 5,771 households, of which 40.1% had children under the age of 18 living with them, 57.3% were married couples living together, 9.9% had a female householder with no husband present, and 29.1% were non-families. 23.7% of all households were made up of individuals, and 5.9% had someone living alone who was 65 years of age or older. The average household size was 2.59 and the average family size was 3.09.

29.2% of the population were under the age of 18, 8.9% from 18 to 24, 34.0% from 25 to 44, 21.2% from 45 to 64, and 6.7% who were 65 years of age or older. The median age was 32 years. For every 100 females, there were 97.4 males. For every 100 females age 18 and over, there were 94.4 males.

The median household income was $44,542 and the median family income was $51,765. Males had a median income of $32,105 and females $22,148. The per capita income was $19,368. About 4.7% of families and 6.3% of the population were below the poverty line, including 7.8% of those under age 18 and 14.8% of those age 65 or over.

== Economy ==
=== Businesses ===
Technology companies with West Fargo locations include:

- Applied Industrial Technologies
- BNG Technologies
- Data Technologies Inc.
- High Point Networks
- Network Center Communications
- Norse Technologies
- Razor Tracking
- Red Chair Solutions
- TrueIT
- Digital Famous Media

Manufacturing companies within West Fargo locations include:

- Doosan Bobcat, North America Regional Headquarters
- Caterpillar Remanufacturing
- Marvin Windows

== Arts and culture ==
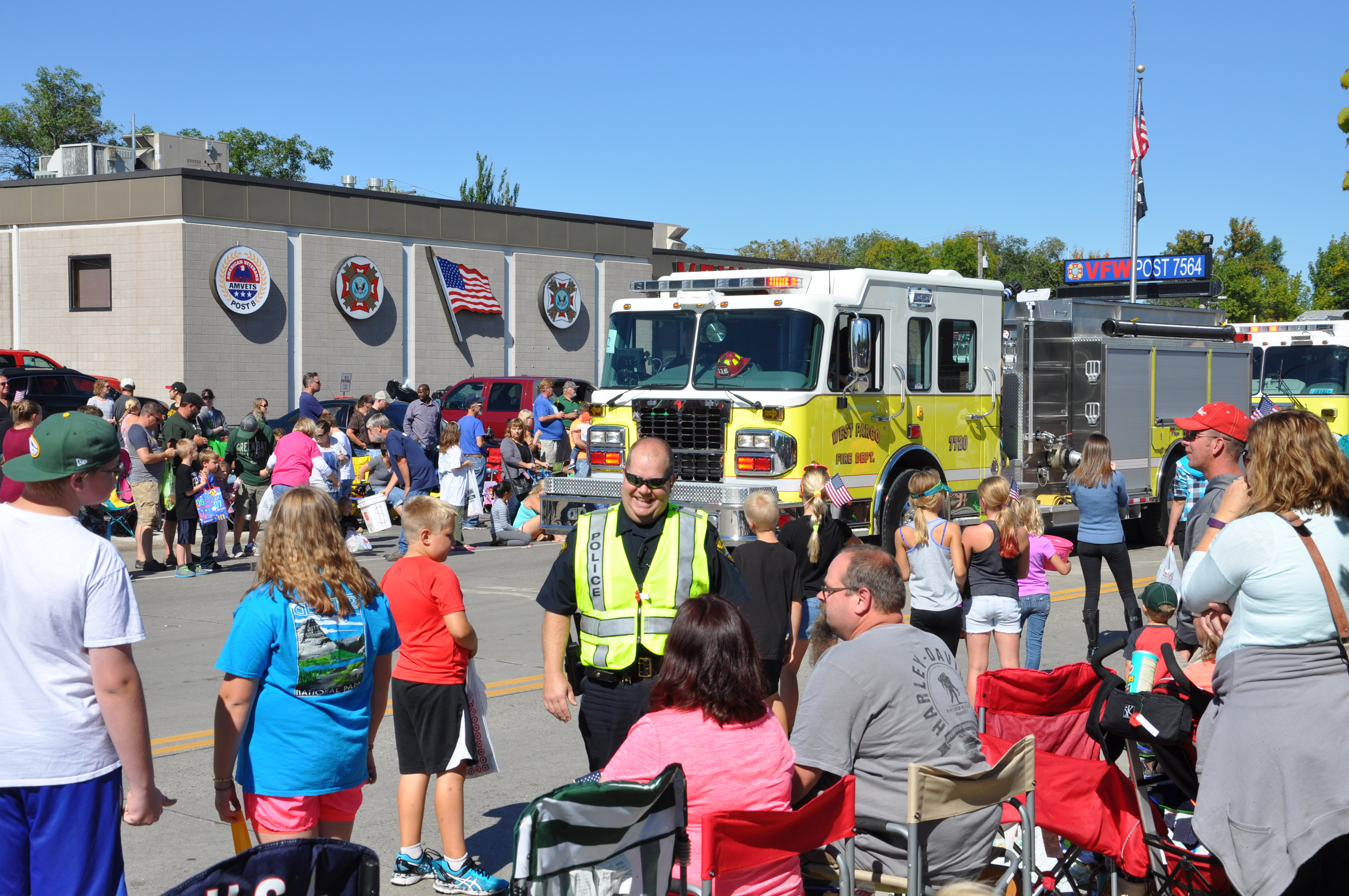
West Fest Parade

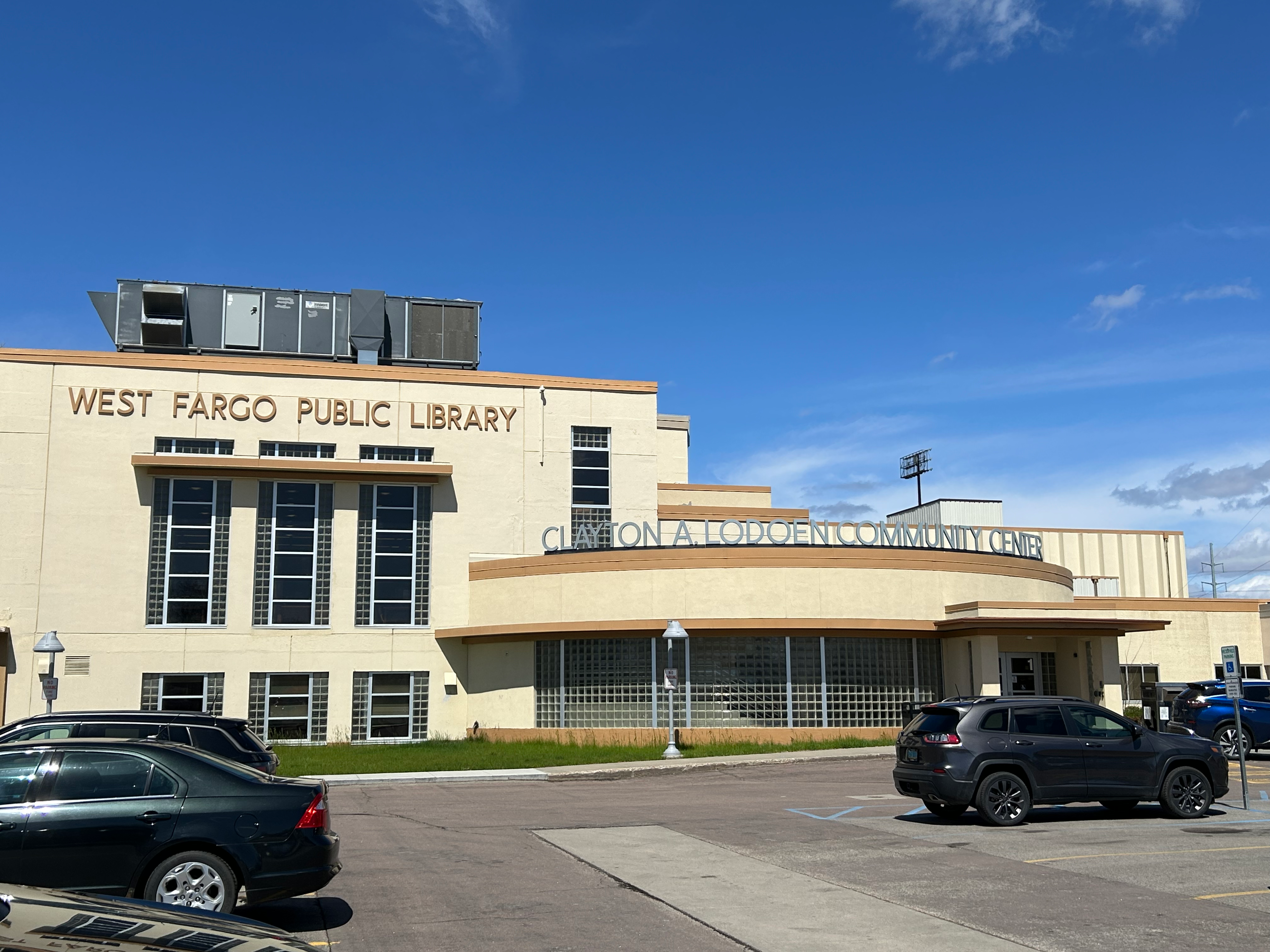
West Fargo Public Library

=== Museums ===
- Bonanzaville, USA – is a village made up of many historic buildings from the region. It includes a church, school building, and log cabins. It is named after the historic bonanza farms of the area.

=== Annual events ===
- Big Iron Farm Show, an annual event located at the West Fargo Fairgrounds, features farm equipment and over 900 exhibit booths. Over 87,000 attendees took part in the three-day Big Iron in 2013.
- Bonanzaville Pioneer Days includes a parade, food, demonstrations and tours.
- Hamfest, an annual event located at the West Fargo Fairgrounds, features presentations and equipment for sale.
- Nite to Unite, hosted by the West Fargo Police Department, is an annual community summer event. Past activities have included police, fire, ambulance and military demonstrations.
- Red River Valley Fair includes entertainment, arts and crafts shows, livestock, fireworks and a petting zoo.
- West Fest, held in September, includes a softball tournament, pancake feed, parade, and firefighter's ball.

=== Public library ===
The West Fargo Public Library is located in the Clayton A. Lodoen Center. The library moved into this facility in 2005.

== Park and recreation ==
The West Fargo Park District maintains 30 parks, bike paths, and facilities that include Scheels Soccer Complex, Veterans Memorial Arena, Rustad Recreation Center and Veterans Memorial Pool.

== Government ==
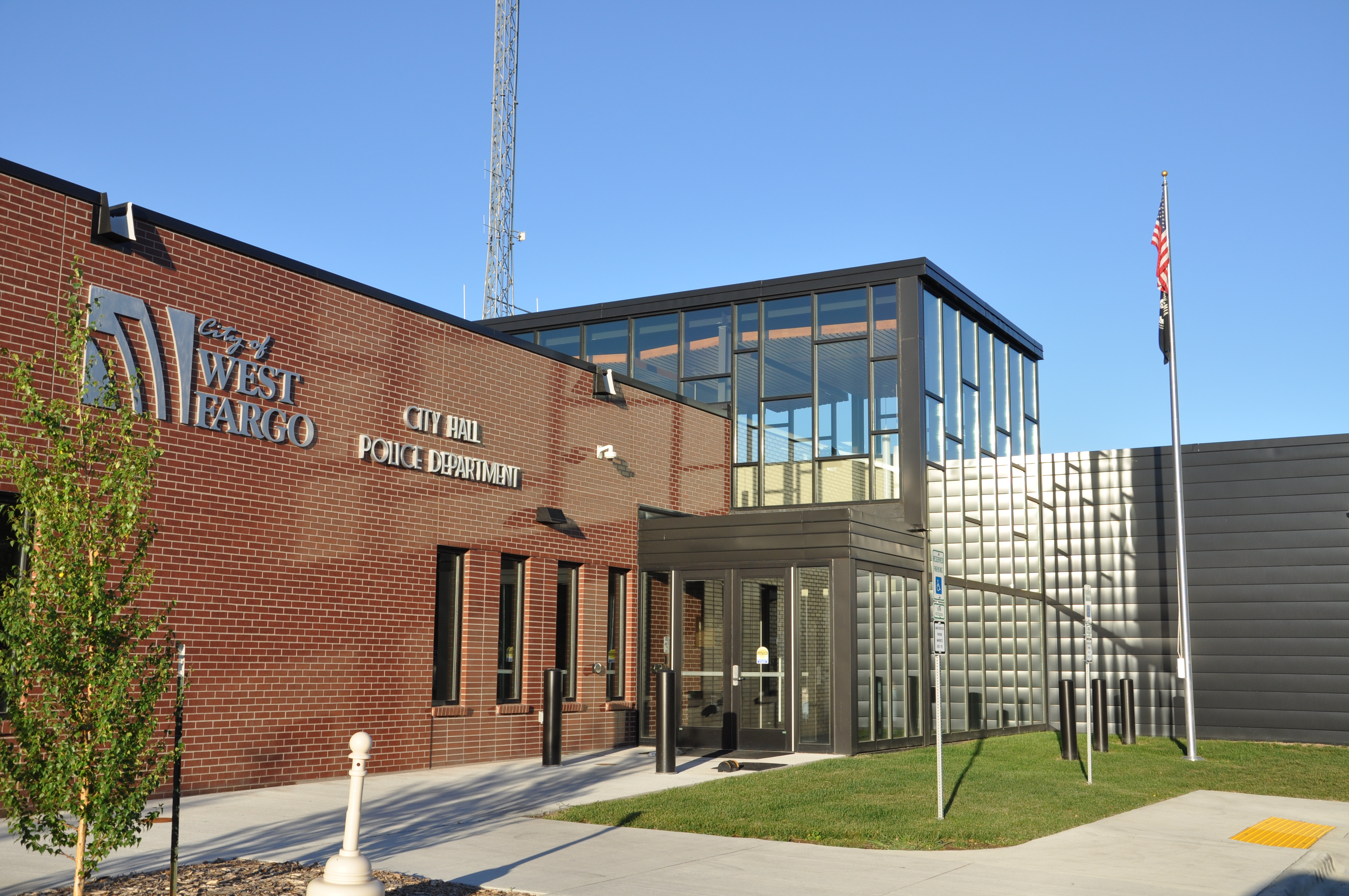
West Fargo City Hall

The City of West Fargo is governed by a Board of City Commissioners, which consists of the President of the Board (Mayor) and four City Commissioners. The current mayor of West Fargo as of 2018 is Bernie Dardis.

West Fargo City Hall opened in May 1975. The building includes a public library, city offices, and police parking.

== Education ==
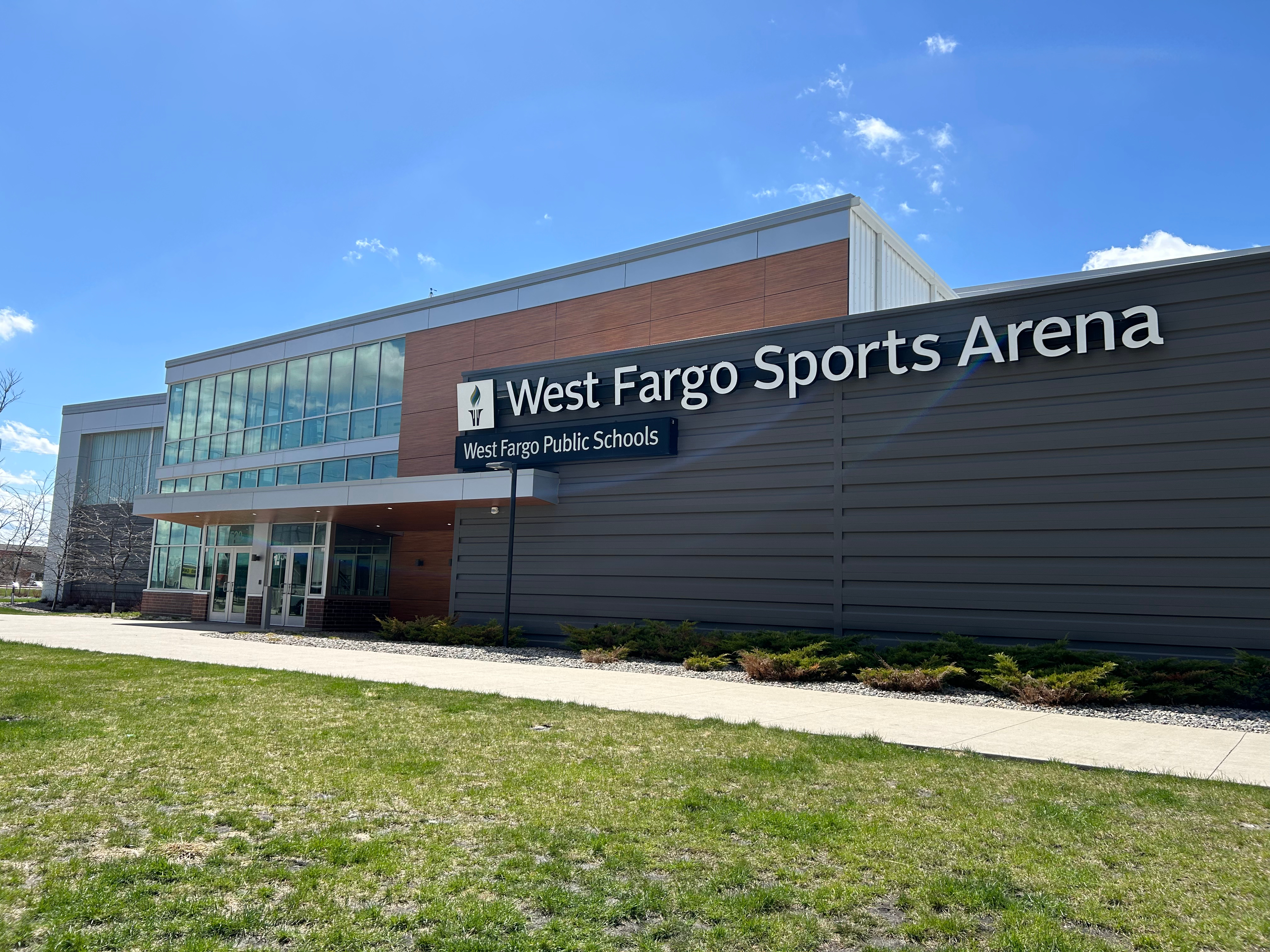
West Fargo Sports Arena, part of West Fargo Public Schools.

West Fargo Public Schools serves the city of West Fargo, much of southwestern Fargo, the suburb of Reile's Acres, and the communities of Horace and Harwood.

The school district operates two early childhood schools (Clayton A. Lodoen Kindergarten Center and Osgood Kindergarten Center), ten elementary schools (Aurora Elementary, Brooks Harbor Elementary, Deer Creek Elementary, Eastwood Elementary, Freedom Elementary, Harwood Elementary, Horace Elementary, Independence Elementary, L.E. Berger Elementary, Legacy Elementary, Liberty 5th Grade, Meadowlark Elementary, Osgood Elementary, South Elementary, Willow Park Elementary, and Westside Elementary), three middle schools (Cheney Middle, Heritage Middle, and Liberty Middle) and four high schools (West Fargo High School, Sheyenne High, Horace High, and Community High).

In 2016, the school district began construction of an $18.5 million competitive pool facility at the L.E. Berger Elementary School.

In 2016, West Fargo High School teacher Michelle Strand earned the Presidential Award of Excellence in Mathematics and Science Teaching.

== Media ==
=== Newspapers and magazines ===
West Fargo news is covered in several newspapers and magazines including:

- Area Woman Magazine
- Fargo Forum
- Fargo Monthly
- Prairie Business
- West Fargo Pioneer mailed free to every West Fargo resident

== Infrastructure ==
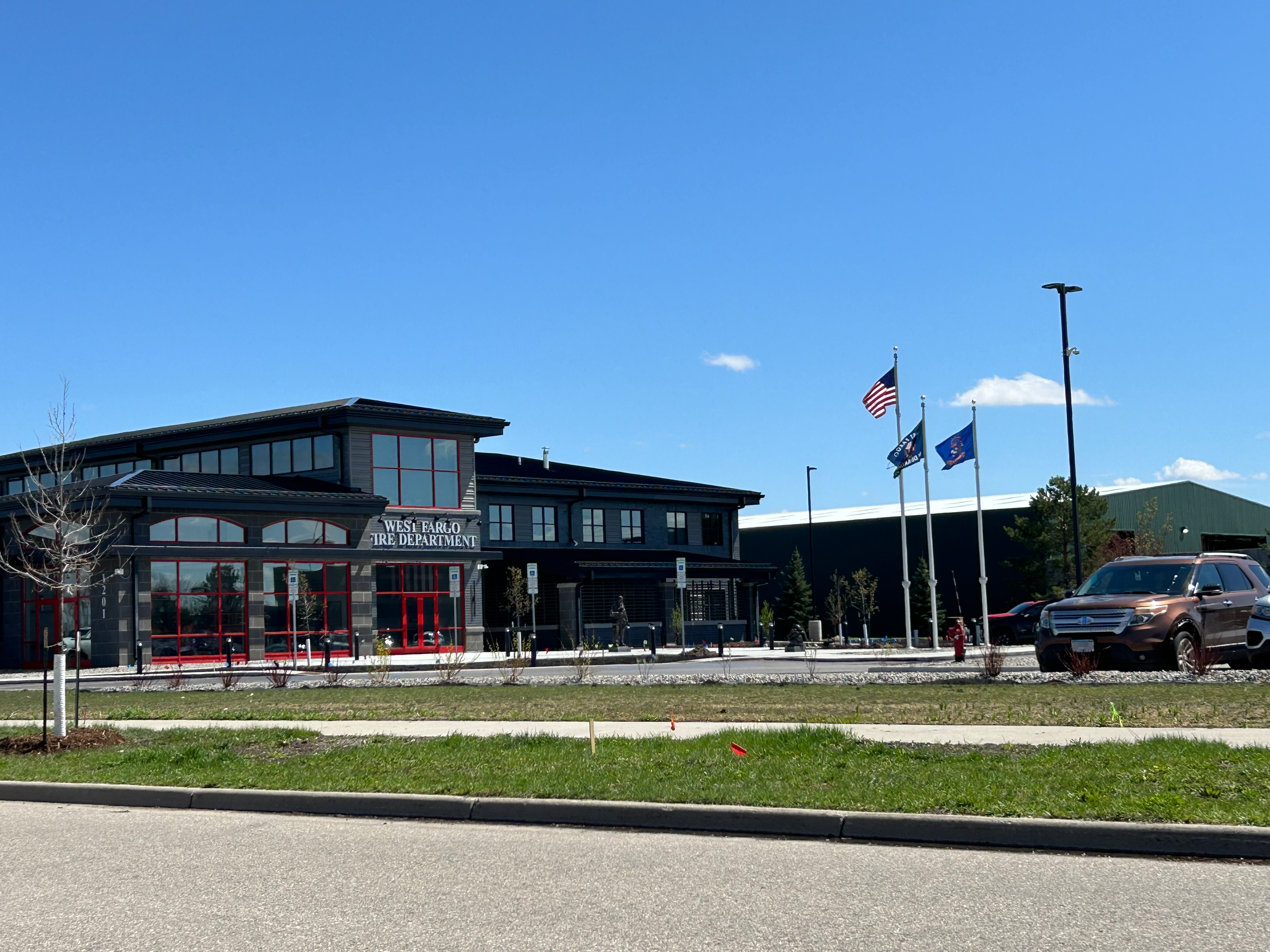
West Fargo Fire Department, Main Station

=== Transportation ===
West Fargo works with North Dakota Department of Transportation, Fargo-Moorhead Metropolitan Council of Governments (Metro COG), and Fargo Moorhead Metro Area Transit to meet the transportation needs of West Fargo citizens.

West Fargo Municipal Airport is 6 miles (9.7 km) northwest of Fargo.

=== Police ===
The Police Department has grown from three officers in 1968, to 78 sworn officers as of 2023.

=== Public works ===
Public Works Department oversees streets, sewer and water, sanitation and forestry for the city. "There are eight (8) existing wells within the City. The total pumping capacity of all wells together is 3,500 gallons per minute (5 million gallons per day)."

=== Fire Department ===
West Fargo Fire and Rescue has 23 career and 45 part-time positions. The department has two stations and provides "all hazard" services including fire suppression, community risk reduction, basic life support EMS, hazmat, and technical rescue specialties such as water/ice rescue, high angle rope rescue and tactical EMS.

== Notable people ==
- Anthony W. England, NASA astronaut
- Bryce Haugeberg, racing driver
- Jan Maxwell, Broadway actress and five time Tony Award nominee
- Tyler Roehl, former running back with the Seattle Seahawks and Minnesota Vikings
- Matt Strahm, Major League Baseball pitcher
- Alon Wieland, businessman and North Dakota state legislator
