= Alexander C. McGillivray =

American politician (1859–1907)

President pro tempore of the North Dakota Senate
- In office 1899–1901
- Preceded by: Clarence B. Little
- Succeeded by: Judson LaMoure

Member of the North Dakota Senate from the 31st district
- In office 1891–1901
- Preceded by: Nelson C. Lawrence
- Succeeded by: Leslie A. Simpson

Personal details
- Born: January 24, 1859 Toronto, Ontario, Canada
- Died: June 4, 1907 (aged 48) Dickinson, North Dakota, U.S.
- Party: Republican
- Spouse: Mary J. Montague (m. 1888)

Alexander C. McGillivray (January 24, 1859 – June 4, 1907) was an American politician who was pro tempore of the North Dakota Senate from 1899 to 1901.

== Business career ==
McGillivray was born on January 24, 1859 in Toronto. His father, Neil McGillivray, was a native of Scotland.

McGillivray's first business experience was with the hardware industry in Woodbridge, Ontario. In 1877, he moved to United States and worked as a traveling salesman for five years. In 1882, he moved to the Dakota Territory and worked as a clerk in Bismarck for a year. He then spent two years in Weller, where he ran a general store. He subsequently moved to Dickinson, North Dakota, where he ran a similar business for a decade and was a forwarding agent for the Black Hills and Western Railroad. He acquired a large parcel of land northwest of Dickinson, where he operated a cattle and horse ranch. He was also a co-owner and manager of the Lehigh Coal Company, which ran lignite mines in Dickinson.

== Politics ==
In 1887, McGillivray was elected to the Stark County commission. In 1890, he was elected to the North Dakota Senate as an independent. He was reelected in 1892 as a Republican. From 1899 to 1901, he was president pro tempore of the Senate.

In 1899, he was appointed register of the United States General Land Office in Bismarck. In 1905, he succeeded in having a land office established in Dickinson and served as register there until business pressures forced his resignation the following year.

== Personal life ==
On January 18, 1888, McGillivray married Mary J. Montague, a fellow Canadian then residing in Caro, Michigan. Around 1895, he had a large sandstone home constructed at 345 Sims Street. The residence, known as the "Lion House" due to the presence of two large statues gifted to a later owner, is claimed to be haunted.

McGillivray died on June 4, 1907 at his home after a short bout with Bright's disease.
