= Clarence B. Little =

American politician

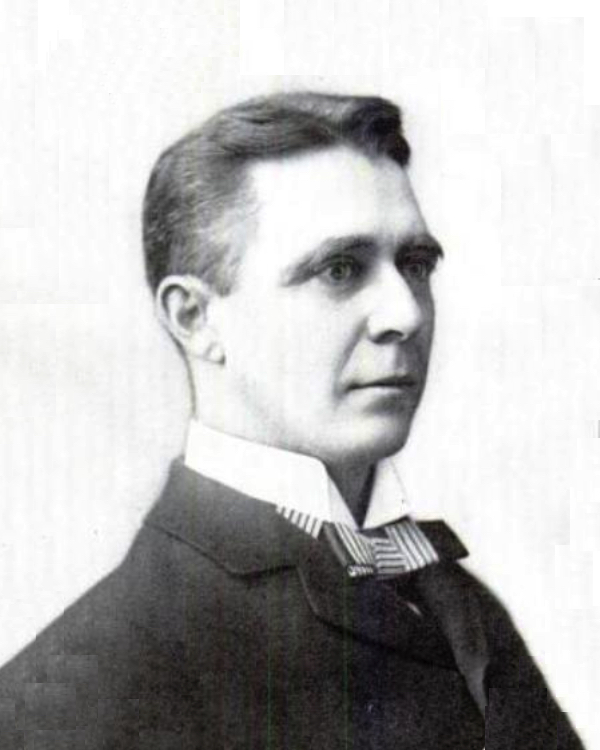
- Portrait of Little, c. 1901

President pro tempore of the North Dakota Senate
- In office January 5, 1897 – January 3, 1899
- Preceded by: John E. Haggart
- Succeeded by: Alexander C. McGillivray

Member of the North Dakota Senate from the 27th district
- In office November 19, 1889 – January 5, 1909
- Preceded by: None (office established)
- Succeeded by: George A. Welch

Personal details
- Born: Clarence Belden Little; November 18, 1857 Pembroke, New Hampshire
- Died: September 25, 1941 (aged 83) Saint Paul, Minnesota
- Party: Republican
- Spouses: Caroline (m. 1884; died 1933); Irene (m. 1938)
- Education: Dartmouth College (AB); Harvard Law School (LLB)

Clarence Belden Little (November 18, 1857 – September 25, 1941) was an American attorney and politician who served as a member of the North Dakota Senate from North Dakota's admission to the Union in 1889 to 1909. He was, throughout that time, chairman of the Judiciary Committee.

He died in Saint Paul, Minnesota on September 25, 1941.
