= West Fargo Public Schools =

School district in North Dakota, U.S.

Address
- 207 Main Avenue W West Fargo, North Dakota, 58078; United States

District information
- Type: Public
- Motto: Educating today's learners for tomorrow's world
- Grades: K-12
- Established: 1876; 150 years ago
- Superintendent: Beth Slette
- NCES District ID: 3819410

Students and staff
- Students: 12,702 (2022-2023)
- Teachers: 942.60 (on an FTE basis)
- Student–teacher ratio: 12.27

Other information
- Website: www.west-fargo.k12.nd.us

West Fargo Public Schools (WFPS) is a public school district in West Fargo, North Dakota, United States. It serves a city population of 35,708. As of the 2019–2020 school year, the district owns and operates one early childhood (kindergarten) centers, fourteen elementary schools, two middle schools, two comprehensive high schools, and one alternative high school.

In recent years, WFPS has seen record growth. The total enrollment in WFPS on the first day of school in August 2017 was 10,635, an increase of 584 students from the 2016–2017 school year. This was an increase of 497 students, or 6.18%, continuing the trend over the previous 20 years: since 1993, West Fargo Public Schools have added 3,770 students to their rolls, a 78.97% increase. This growth is requiring the construction of new schools in the district.

== Schools ==
=== High schools ===
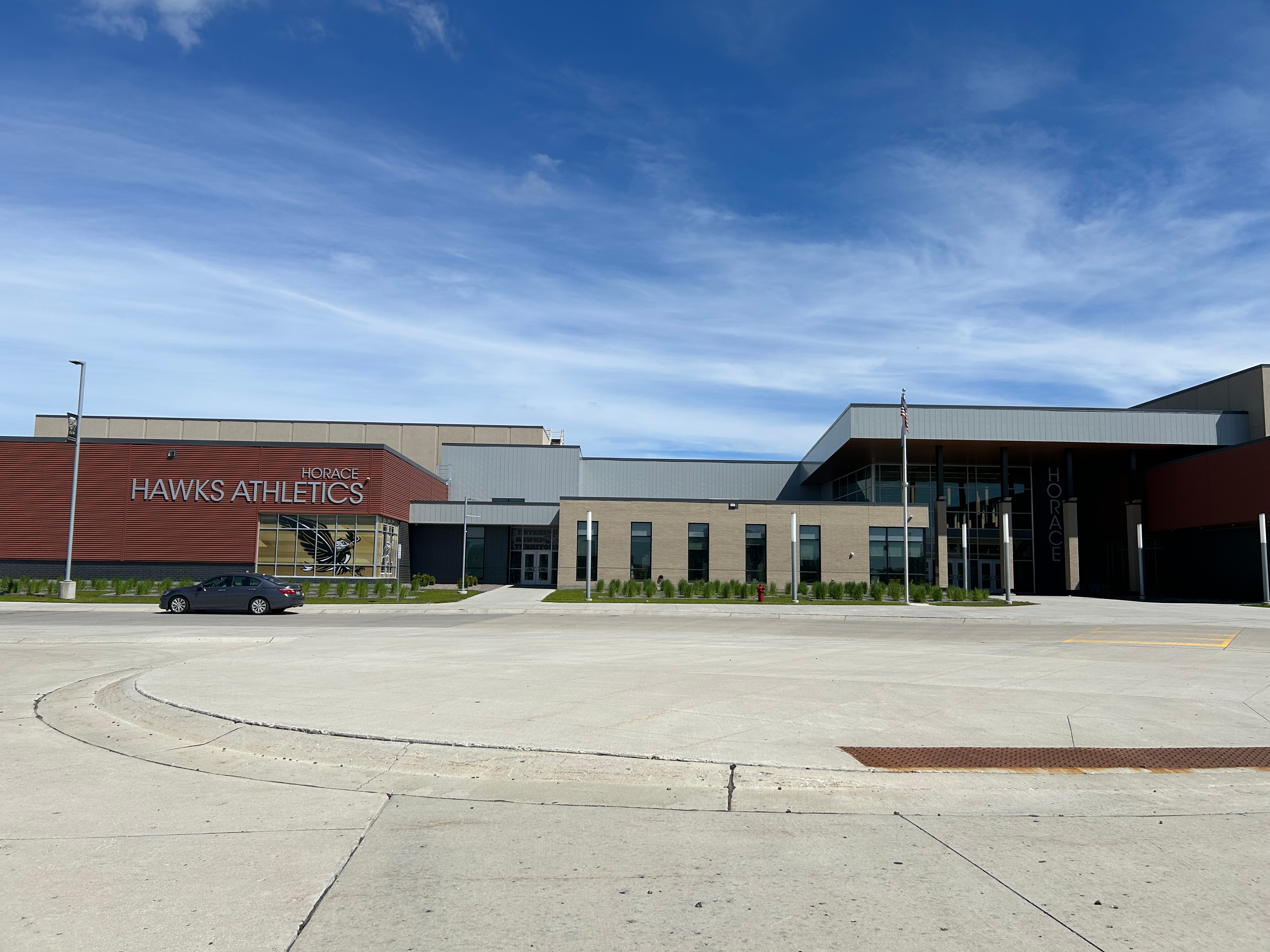
Horace High School, part of West Fargo Public Schools.

- West Fargo High School (comprehensive high school), serving all 9th, 10th, 11th, and 12th graders north of Interstate 94
- Sheyenne High School (comprehensive high school), serving all 9th, 10th, 11th, and 12th graders south of Interstate 94
- Horace High School (comprehensive high school), serving all 9th, 10th, 11th, and 12th graders south of 32nd Avenue W & west of Sheyenne Street
- Community High School (alternative high school), for Grades 9-12

=== Middle schools ===
The following WFPS middle schools serve Grades 6–8:

- Cheney Middle School
- Liberty Middle School
- Heritage Middle School

=== Elementary schools ===
The following WFPS elementary schools serve Grades K–5:

- Aurora Elementary School
- Brooks Harbor Elementary School
- Deer Creek Elementary School
- Eastwood Elementary School
- Freedom Elementary School
- Harwood Elementary School
- Horace Elementary School
- Independence Elementary School
- L.E. Berger Elementary School
- Legacy Elementary School
- Meadowlark Elementary School
- Osgood Elementary School
- South Elementary School
- Westside Elementary School
- Willow Park Elementary School

=== Other schools ===
- Early Childhood Center
