= Big Iron Farm Show =

Farm show held in North Dakota, United States of America

Coordinates: 46°52′27″N 96°55′51″W

The Big Iron Farm Show is a large farm show held on the grounds of the Red River Valley Fairgrounds in West Fargo, North Dakota. The show started in 1980 in Casselton, North Dakota, but moved to West Fargo in 1981.
