= John E. Haggart =

American politician

President pro tempore of the North Dakota Senate
- In office January 8, 1895 – January 5, 1897
- Preceded by: John H. Worst
- Succeeded by: Clarence B. Little

Member of the North Dakota Senate from the 9th district
- In office November 19, 1889 – January 17, 1898
- Preceded by: None (office established)
- Succeeded by: Joseph E. Cronan

Personal details
- Born: John Eldridge Haggart; April 19, 1846 Morristown, New York, U.S.
- Died: September 20, 1905 (aged 59) Fargo, North Dakota, U.S.
- Party: Republican
- Spouse: Birgit Hertsgaard (m. 1874)

John Eldridge Haggart (April 19, 1846 – September 20, 1905) was an American politician who served as a member of the North Dakota Senate from North Dakota's admission in 1889 to his appointment as United States Marshal for the state in 1898.
