= Nevis, Minnesota =

City in Minnesota, United States

Nevis
- City
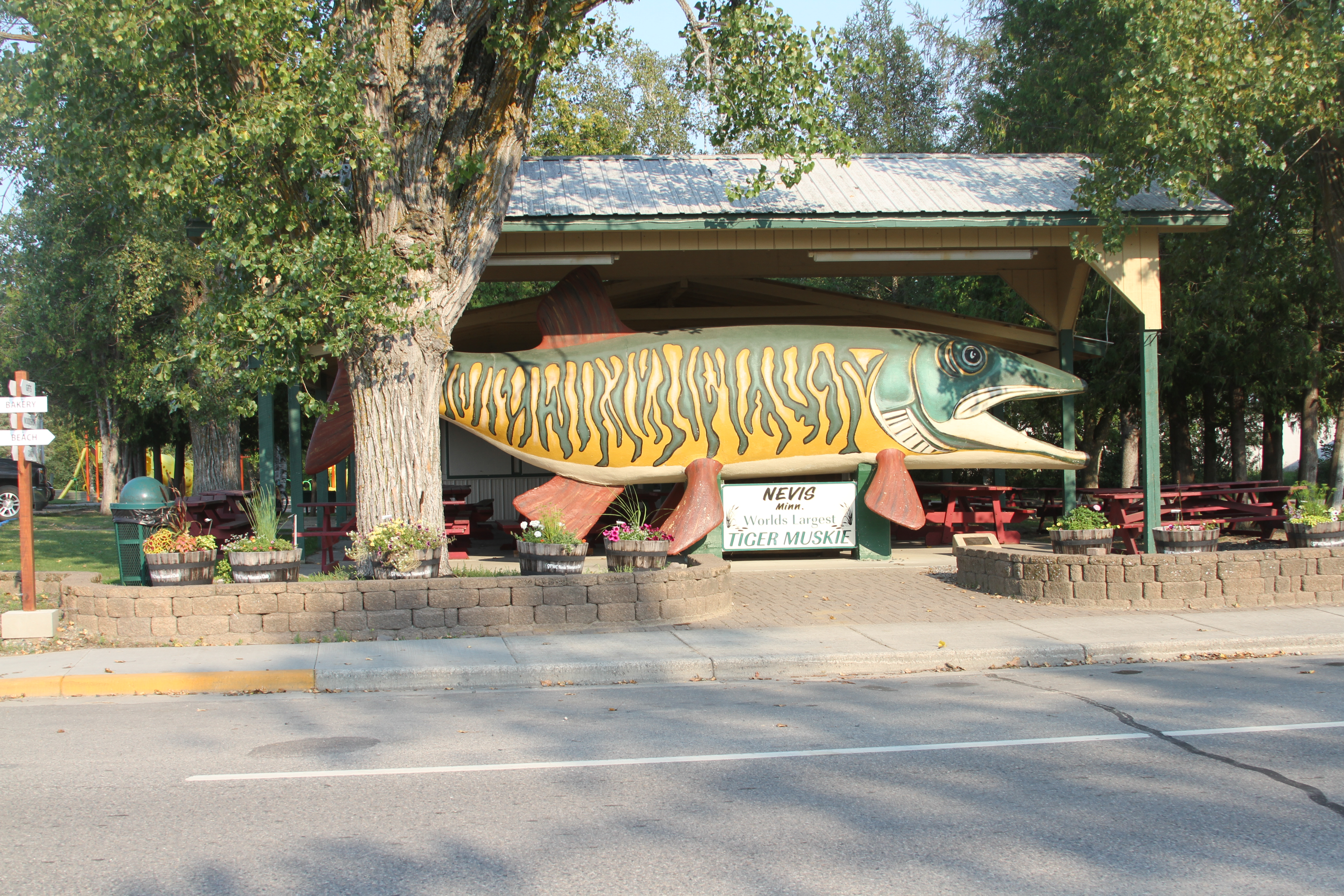
- World's biggest Tiger Muskie

- Location of Nevis, Minnesota
- Coordinates: 46°57′51″N 94°50′40″W
- Country: United States
- State: Minnesota
- County: Hubbard

Government
  - Mayor: Jeanne Thompson

Area
  - Total: 1.01 sq mi (2.62 km^{2})
  - Land: 0.93 sq mi (2.40 km^{2})
  - Water: 0.085 sq mi (0.22 km^{2})
- Elevation: 1,473 ft (449 m)

Population (2020)
  - Total: 377
  - Density: 406.8/sq mi (157.07/km^{2})
- Time zone: UTC-6 (Central (CST))
  - Summer (DST): UTC-5 (CDT)
- ZIP code: 56467
- Area code: 218
- FIPS code: 27-45340
- GNIS feature ID: 0657586
- Website: cityofnevismn.gov

Nevis (/ˈniːvɪs/ NEE-viss) is a city in Hubbard County, Minnesota, United States. The population was 377 at the 2020 census.

Minnesota State Highway 34 serves as a main arterial route in the community.

Nevis began as a railway village. A post office was established in 1899, and the village separated from Nevis Township and incorporated in 1921.

The Louis J. Moser House near Nevis was constructed in the early 1900s and used as a fishing camp. It is listed on the National Register of Historic Places.

Robert G. Renner, a U.S. federal judge, was born in Nevis in 1923.

The muskellunge is native to the waterways in the area, and is celebrated in Nevis. Nevis Muskie Days are held in July, and include a 5K run, a street dance, and numerous vendors. The city is also home to the Nevis Tiger Muskie, a 30-foot-long sculpture.

Nevis is along the Heartland State Trail, a multi-use recreational rail trail.

== Geography ==
According to the United States Census Bureau, the city has an area of 1.01 square miles (2.62 km^{2}), of which 0.93 square miles (2.41 km^{2}) is land and 0.08 square miles (0.21 km^{2}) is water.

== Demographics ==
Historical population
Census	Pop.	Note	%±
1910	238		—
1920	412		73.1%
1930	275		−33.3%
1940	358		30.2%
1950	332		−7.3%
1960	344		3.6%
1970	308		−10.5%
1980	332		7.8%
1990	375		13.0%
2000	364		−2.9%
2010	390		7.1%
2020	377		−3.3%
U.S. Decennial Census; 2020 Census

=== 2010 census ===
As of the census of 2010, 390 people, 173 households, and 102 families resided in the city. The population density was 419.4 inhabitants per square mile (161.9/km^{2}). There were 217 housing units at an average density of 233.3 per square mile (90.1/km^{2}). The racial makeup of the city was 95.6% White, 0.3% African American, 1.0% Native American, and 3.1% from two or more races. Hispanic or Latino of any race were 0.5% of the population.

There were 173 households, of which 26.0% had children under the age of 18 living with them, 43.9% were married couples living together, 10.4% had a female householder with no husband present, 4.6% had a male householder with no wife present, and 41.0% were non-families. 34.7% of all households were made up of individuals, and 21.4% had someone living alone who was 65 years of age or older. The average household size was 2.23 and the average family size was 2.81.

The median age in the city was 45.5 years. 24.6% of residents were under the age of 18; 4.9% were between the ages of 18 and 24; 20.2% were from 25 to 44; 26.6% were from 45 to 64; and 23.6% were 65 years of age or older. The gender makeup of the city was 48.7% male and 51.3% female.

=== 2000 census ===
As of the census of 2000, 364 people, 162 households, and 109 families resided in the city. The population density was 388.9 inhabitants per square mile (150.2/km^{2}). There were 199 housing units at an average density of 212.6 per square mile (82.1/km^{2}). The racial makeup of the city was 96.98% White, 1.10% Native American, 0.27% from other races, and 1.65% from two or more races. Hispanic or Latino of any race were 1.65% of the population.

There were 162 households, of which 26.5% had children under the age of 18 living with them, 56.2% were married couples living together, 9.3% had a female householder with no husband present, and 32.1% were non-families. 29.6% of all households were made up of individuals, and 18.5% had someone living alone who was 65 years of age or older. The average household size was 2.25 and the average family size was 2.74.

In the city, the population was spread out, with 23.6% under the age of 18, 4.1% from 18 to 24, 24.2% from 25 to 44, 22.8% from 45 to 64, and 25.3% who were 65 years of age or older. The median age was 43 years. For every 100 females, there were 81.1 males. For every 100 females age 18 and over, there were 82.9 males.

The median income for a household in the city was $26,771, and the median income for a family was $35,938. Males had a median income of $27,188 versus $20,000 for females. The per capita income was $14,259. About 11.7% of families and 14.0% of the population were below the poverty line, including 12.0% of those under age 18 and 15.2% of those age 65 or over.

== Radio stations ==
FM radio

- 92.5 KXKK 92.5 Hot Country
- 94.5 KDLB Adult Contemporary The Arrow 94.7
- 97.5 KDKK 97.5 Music of Your Life
- 99.1 KLLZ-FM 99.1 Z99 Classic Rock
- 101.9 KQKK KQ102
- 102.5 KKWB-FM

AM radio

- 820 WBKK
- 870 KPRM Classic Country News/Talk
- 1070 KSKK Country, 10,000 Watts
- 1570 KAKK Oldies 1570, 10,000 Watts

== Gallery ==
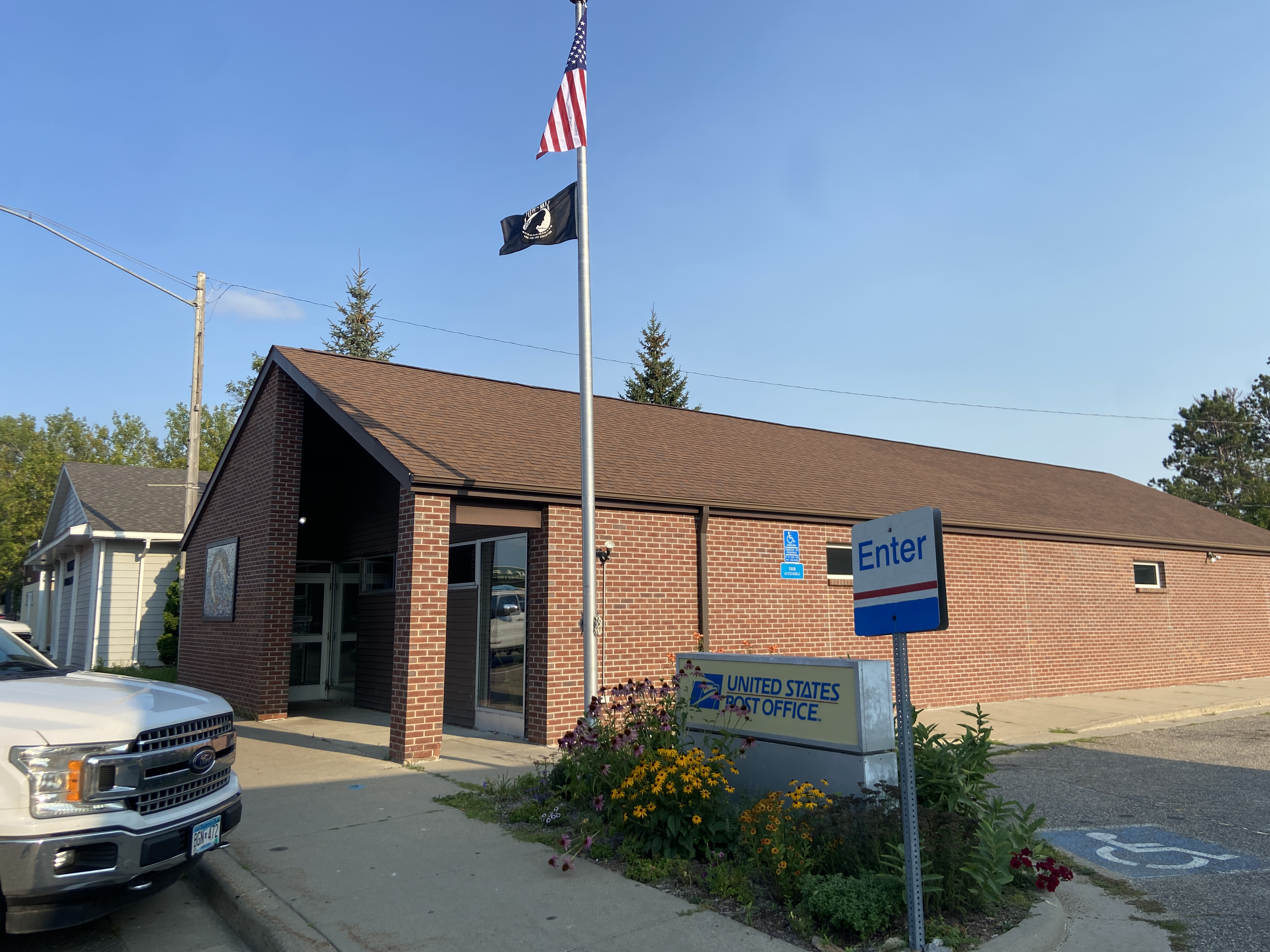
Post Office

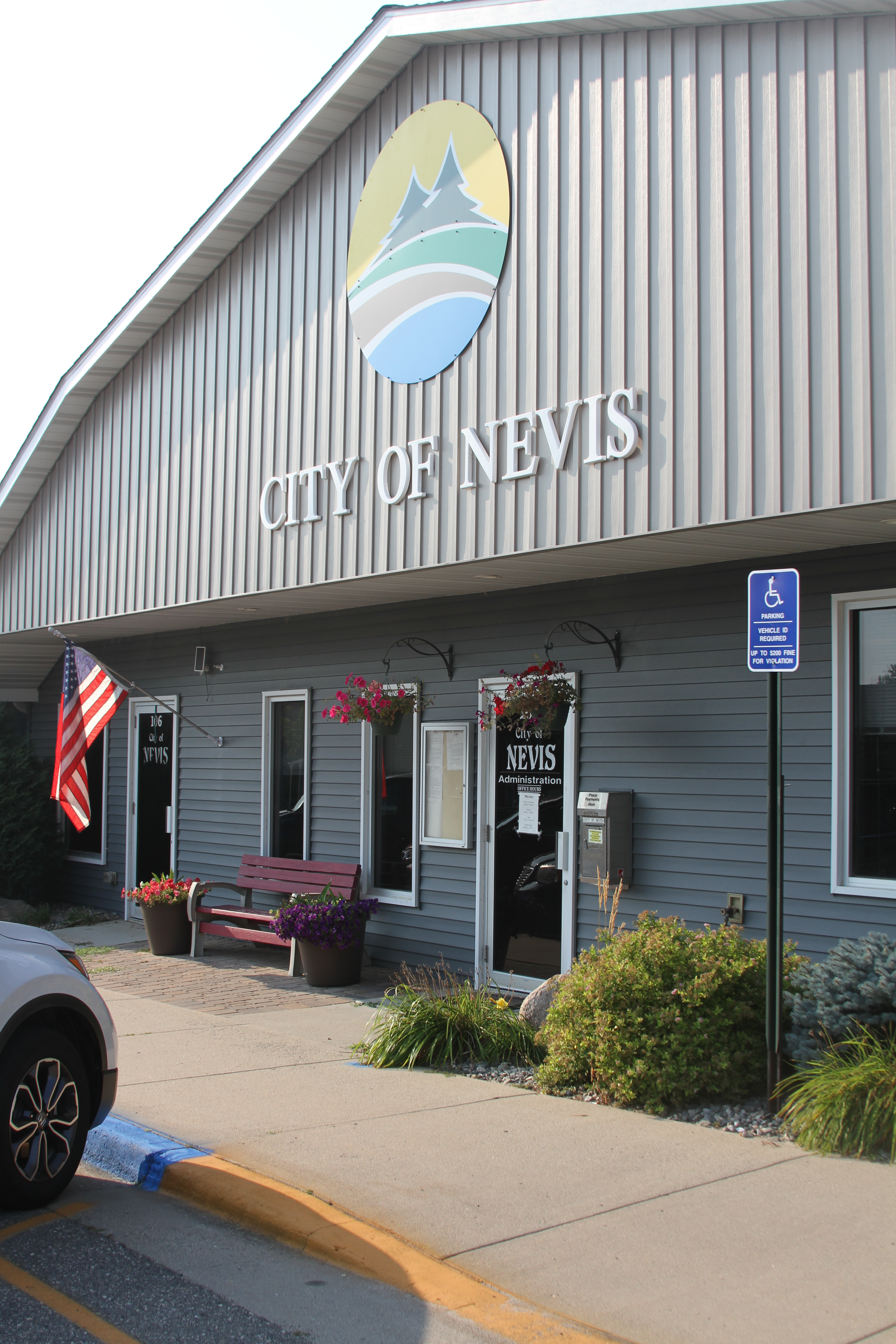
City Hall

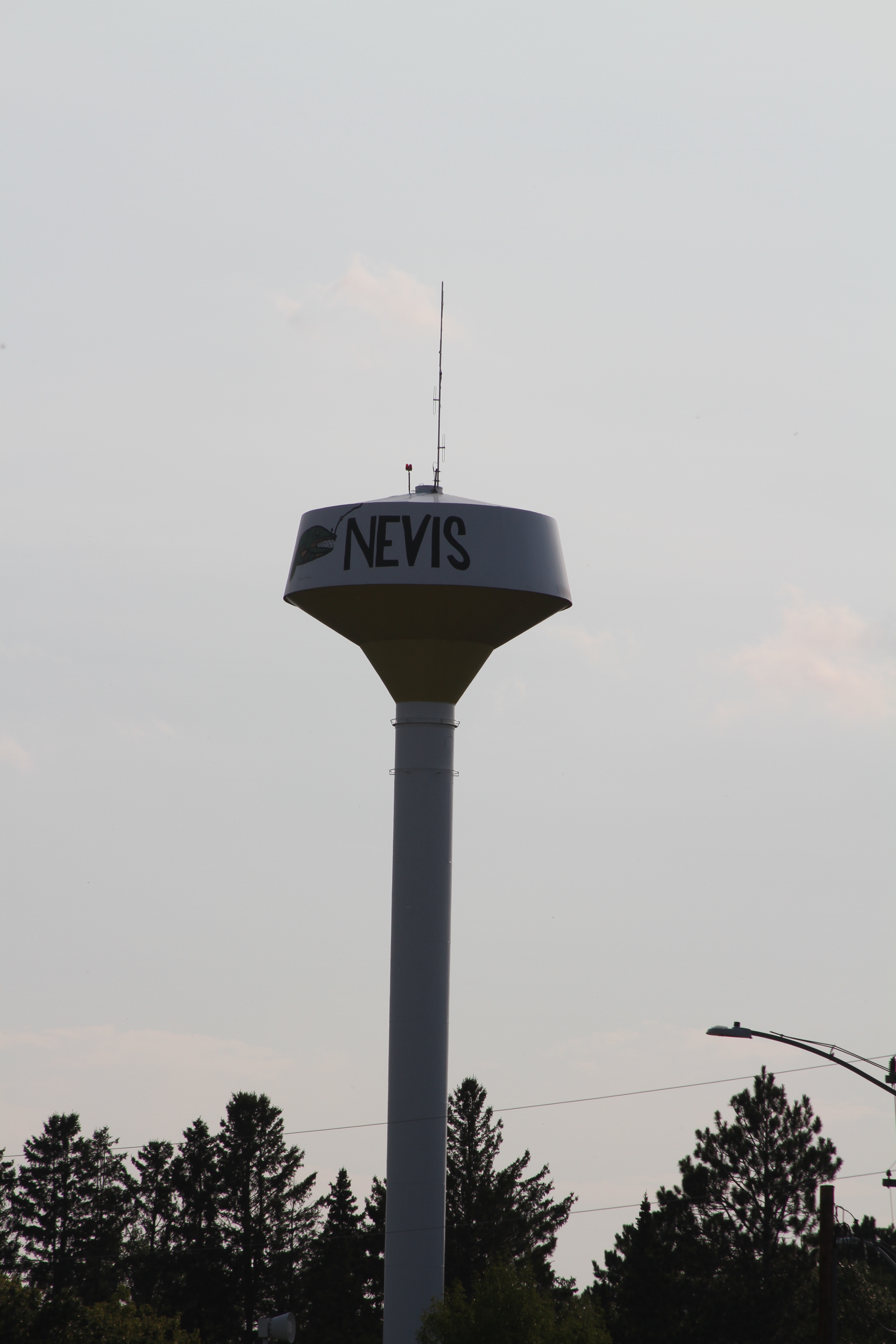
Water tower

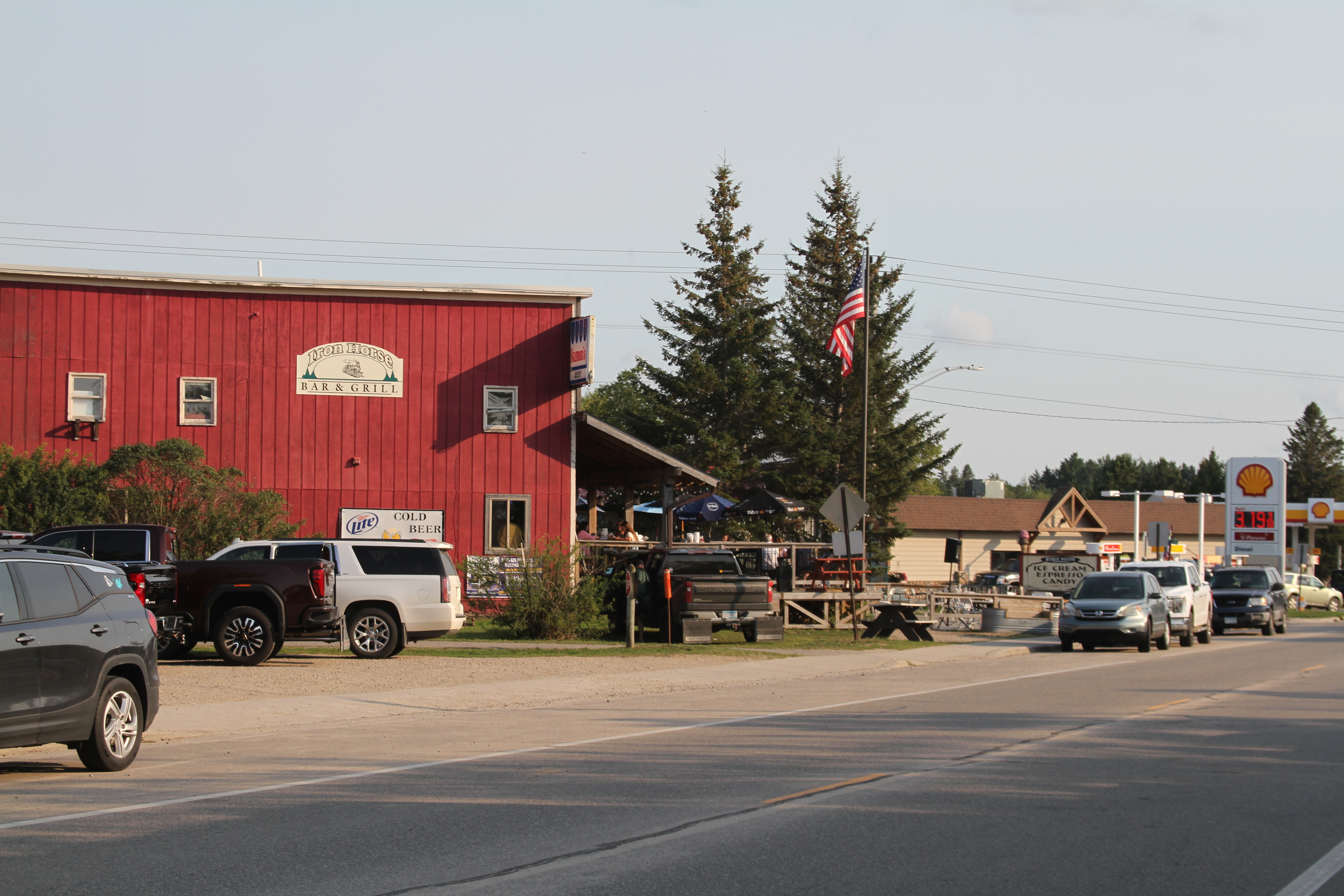
Commerce on Bunyan Trails Drive

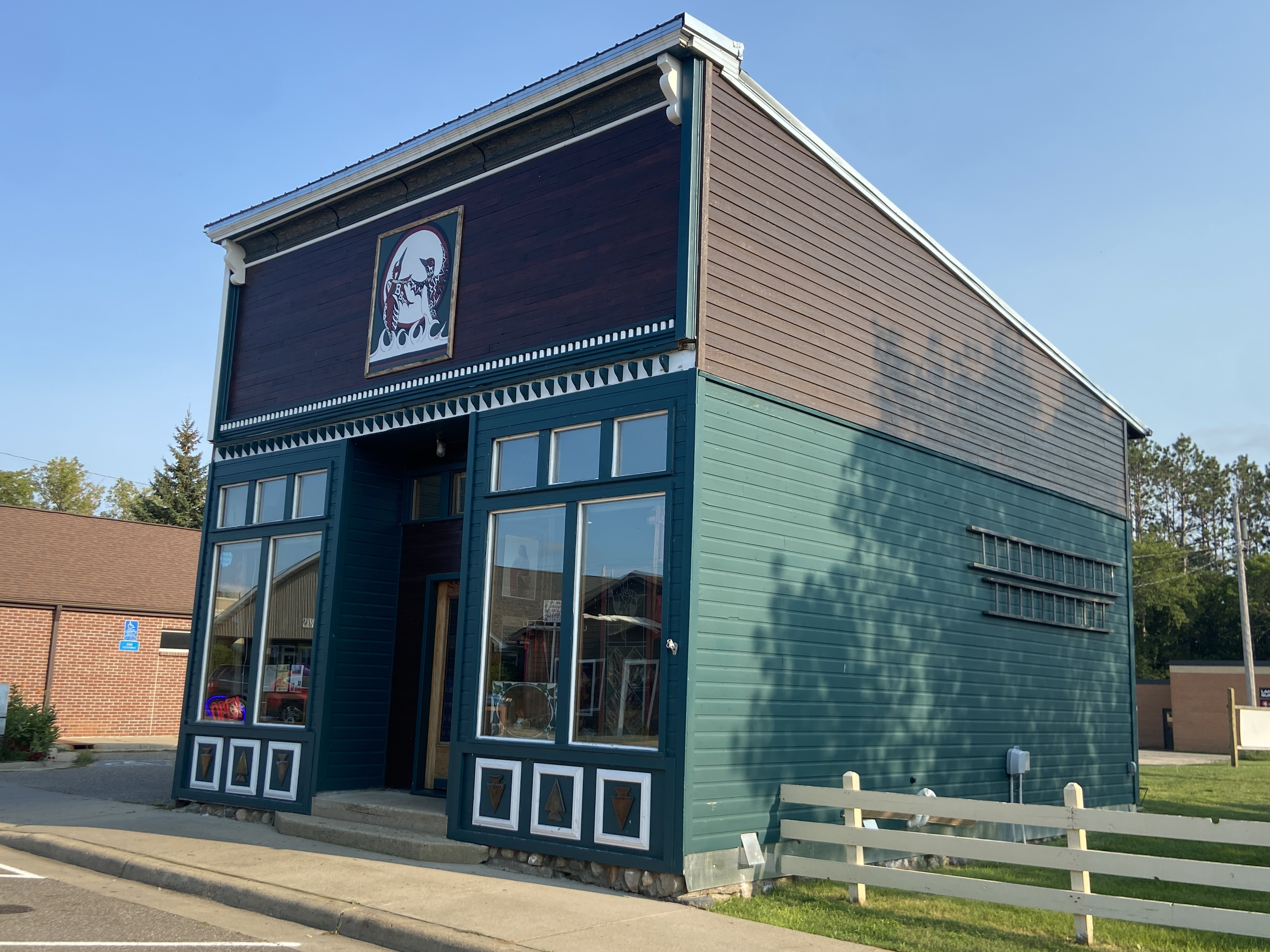
Historical commercial building
