= Menahga, Minnesota =

City in Minnesota, United States

Menahga
- City
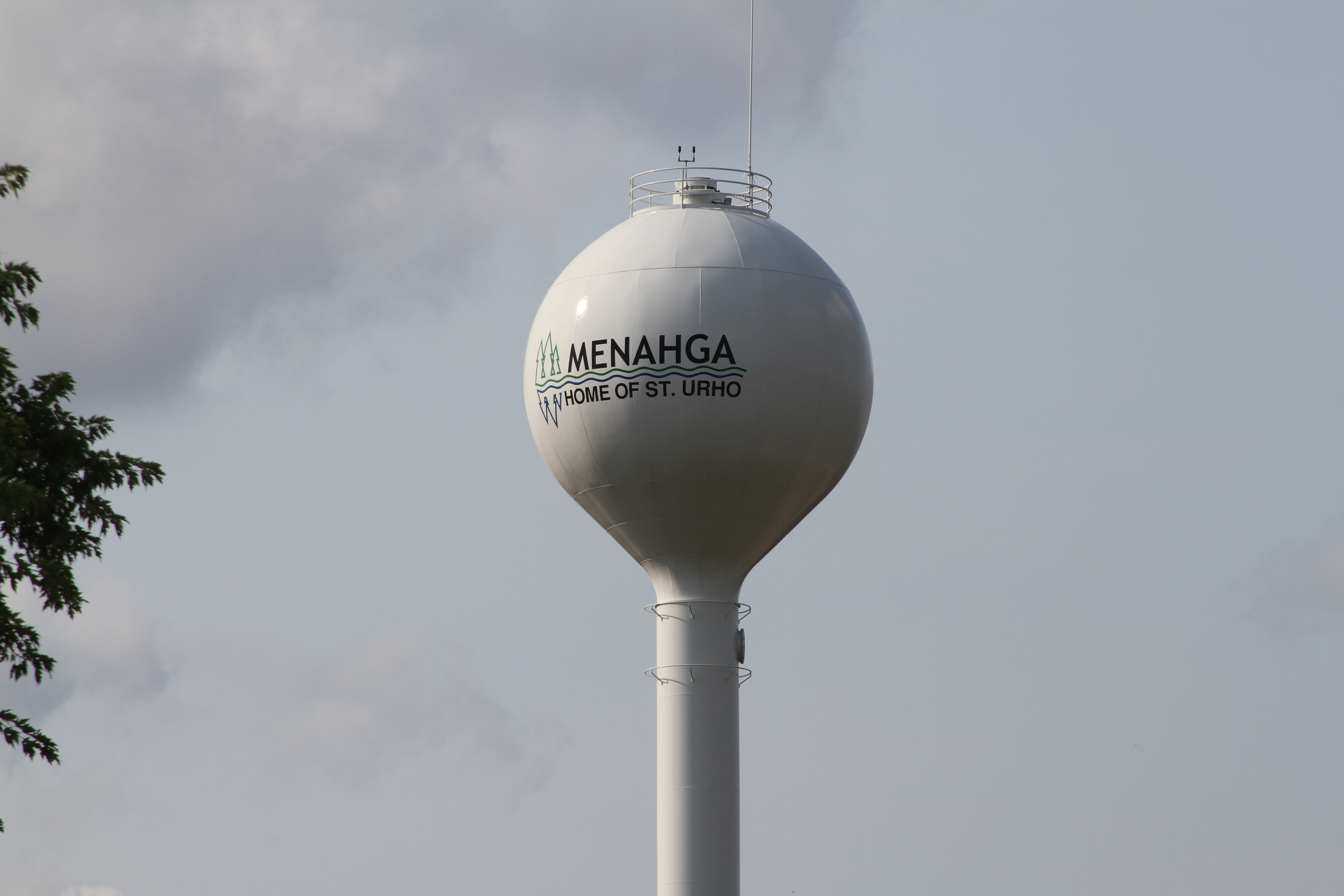
- Water tower
- Motto: Home of St. Urho
- Location of Menahga, Minnesota
- Coordinates: 46°45′21″N 95°06′04″W
- Country: United States
- State: Minnesota
- County: Wadena

Area
  - Total: 3.90 sq mi (10.11 km^{2})
  - Land: 3.71 sq mi (9.61 km^{2})
  - Water: 0.19 sq mi (0.50 km^{2})
- Elevation: 1,381 ft (421 m)

Population (2020)
  - Total: 1,340
  - Density: 361.3/sq mi (139.48/km^{2})
- Time zone: UTC-6 (Central (CST))
  - Summer (DST): UTC-5 (CDT)
- ZIP code: 56464
- Area code: 218
- FIPS code: 27-41660
- GNIS feature ID: 2395093
- Website: City website

Menahga (/məˈnɑːɡə/ mə-NAH-gə) is a city in Wadena County in the U.S. state of Minnesota. As of the 2020 census, its population was 1,340.

== History ==
Menahga was platted in 1891 and named for the Ojibwe word miinikaa meaning "there are [many] blueberries". A post office has been in operation at Menahga since 1891.

== Geography ==
According to the United States Census Bureau, the city has an area of 3.89 square miles (10.08 km^{2}); 3.70 square miles (9.58 km^{2}) is land and 0.19 square miles (0.49 km^{2}) is water.

The Blueberry River flows just north of the city.

U.S. Route 71 and Minnesota State Highway 87 are two of the city's main routes.

== Demographics ==
Historical population
Census	Pop.	Note	%±
1900	413		—
1910	346		−16.2%
1920	478		38.2%
1930	486		1.7%
1940	768		58.0%
1950	849		10.5%
1960	799		−5.9%
1970	835		4.5%
1980	980		17.4%
1990	1,076		9.8%
2000	1,220		13.4%
2010	1,306		7.0%
2020	1,340		2.6%
U.S. Decennial Census

=== 2010 census ===
As of the census of 2010, there were 1,306 people, 569 households, and 301 families living in the city. The population density was 353.0 inhabitants per square mile (136.3/km^{2}). There were 654 housing units at an average density of 176.8 per square mile (68.3/km^{2}). The racial makeup of the city was 97.8% White, 0.5% African American, 0.6% Native American, 0.2% Asian, 0.3% from other races, and 0.7% from two or more races. Hispanic or Latino of any race were 1.1% of the population.

There were 569 households, of which 25.0% had children under the age of 18 living with them, 39.5% were married couples living together, 8.3% had a female householder with no husband present, 5.1% had a male householder with no wife present, and 47.1% were non-families. 42.0% of all households were made up of individuals, and 24.7% had someone living alone who was 65 years of age or older. The average household size was 2.18 and the average family size was 3.01.

The median age in the city was 44.8 years. 24.3% of residents were under the age of 18; 6.2% were between the ages of 18 and 24; 19.8% were from 25 to 44; 21.7% were from 45 to 64; and 28.2% were 65 years of age or older. The gender makeup of the city was 45.9% male and 54.1% female.

=== 2000 census ===
As of the census of 2000, there were 1,220 people, 491 households, and 282 families living in the city. The population density was 328.3 inhabitants per square mile (126.8/km^{2}). There were 556 housing units at an average density of 149.6 per square mile (57.8/km^{2}). The racial makeup of the city was 98.36% White, 0.08% African American, 0.98% Native American, 0.08% Asian, 0.08% from other races, and 0.41% from two or more races. Hispanic or Latino of any race were 0.33% of the population. 42.4% were of Finnish, 23.2% German and 15.5% Norwegian ancestry.

There were 491 households, out of which 25.9% had children under the age of 18 living with them, 45.0% were married couples living together, 9.4% had a female householder with no husband present, and 42.4% were non-families. 37.7% of all households were made up of individuals, and 20.6% had someone living alone who was 65 years of age or older. The average household size was 2.22 and the average family size was 2.98.

In the city, the population was spread out, with 23.8% under the age of 18, 5.6% from 18 to 24, 20.2% from 25 to 44, 17.4% from 45 to 64, and 33.1% who were 65 years of age or older. The median age was 46 years. For every 100 females, there were 81.8 males. For every 100 females age 18 and over, there were 78.5 males.

The median income for a household in the city was $22,232, and the median income for a family was $30,288. Males had a median income of $26,071 versus $18,594 for females. The per capita income for the city was $14,360. About 14.7% of families and 18.7% of the population were below the poverty line, including 22.6% of those under age 18 and 12.3% of those age 65 or over.

== Notable residents ==
The writer-illustrator Wallace Wood, best known as one of the original five Mad cartoonists, was born in Menahga on June 17, 1927. Bhob Stewart documented Wood's Menahga childhood in his 2003 illustrated biography Against the Grain: Mad Artist Wallace Wood.

College basketball head coach Don Monson was born in Menahga in 1933; he moved to Idaho as a child.

Joseph Andrew Quinn, politician and lawyer was born in Menahga.

== Tourist attractions ==
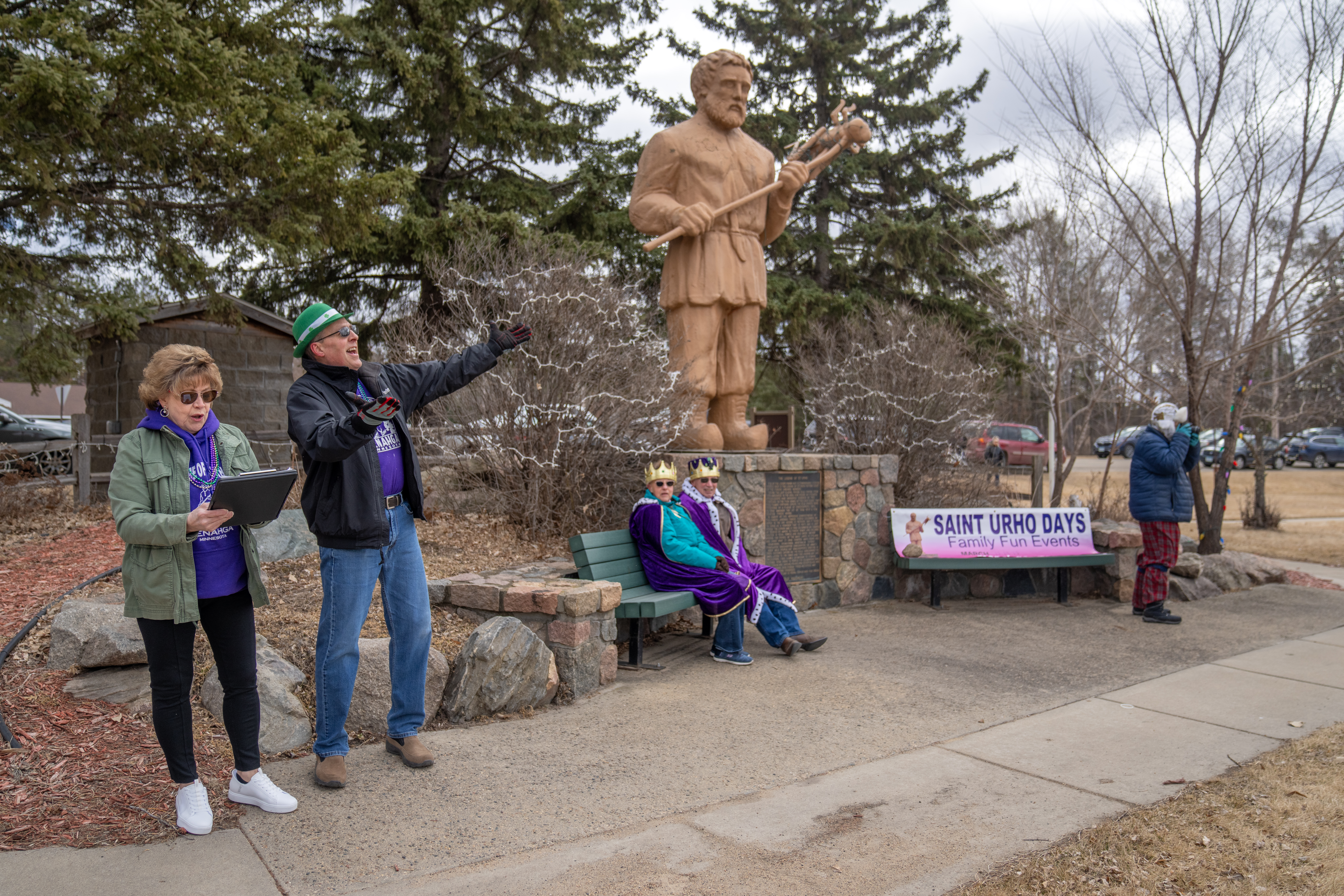
Menahga Mayor Elizabeth Olson introduces the Changing of the Guards at the St. Urho statue

Menahga is known for the legend of the fictional St. Urho, the legendary patron saint of Finland. A statue of St. Urho is along Highway 71 South. Locals celebrate St. Urho's Day on March 16, the day before St. Patrick's Day. Festivities includes costume contests where celebrants wear purple for the vineyards and green for the grasshoppers, and a parade.

== Radio stations ==
FM radio

- 89.3 KOPJ Life Talk Radio
- 92.5 KXKK 92.5 Hot Country
- 94.5 KDLB Adult Contemporary The Arrow 94.7
- 97.5 KDKK 97.5 Music of Your Life
- 101.9 KQKK KQ102

AM radio

- 870 KPRM Classic Country News/Talk
- 1070 KSKK Country, 10,000 watts
- 1570 KAKK Oldies 1570, 10,000 watts

== Gallery ==
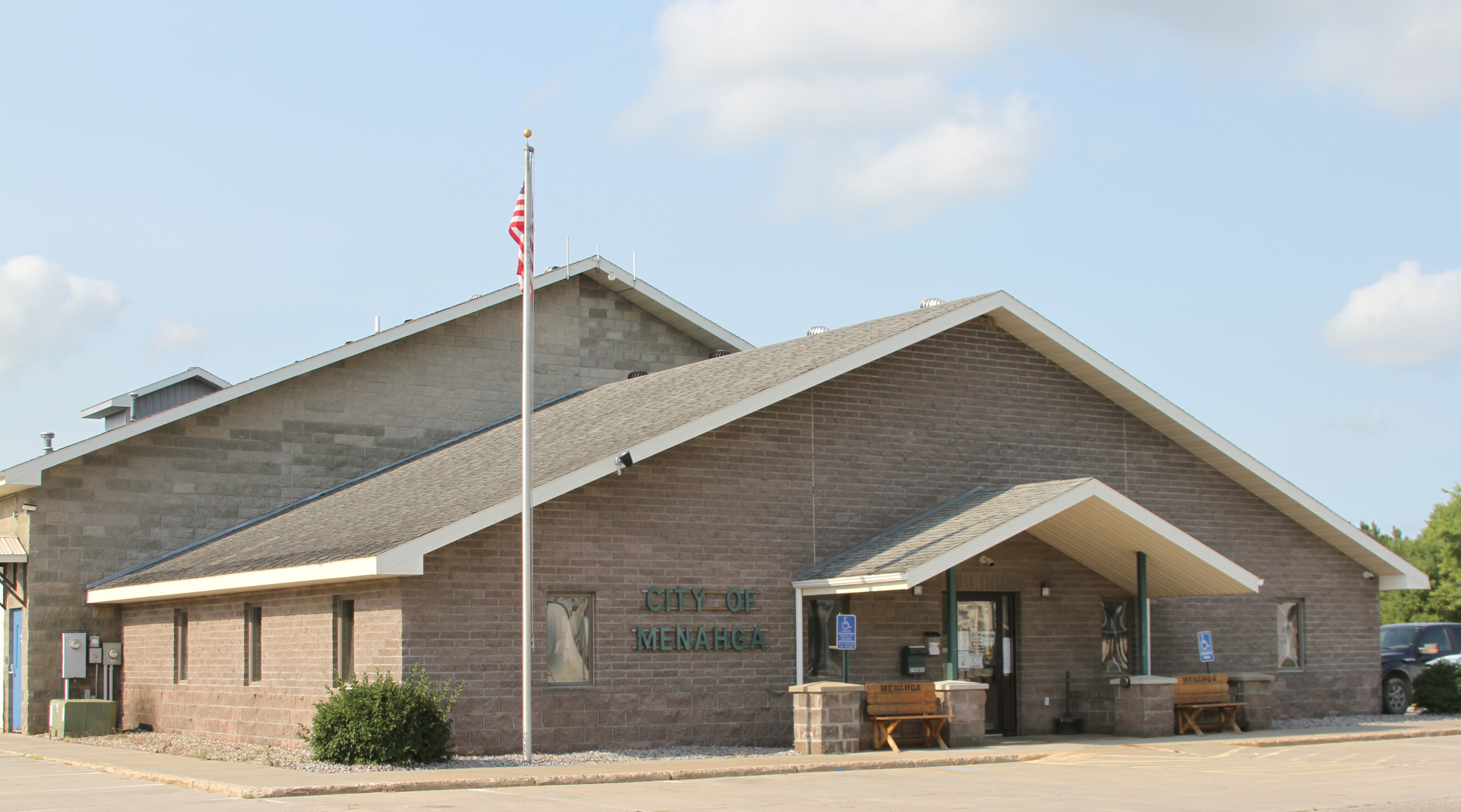
Menahga City Hall

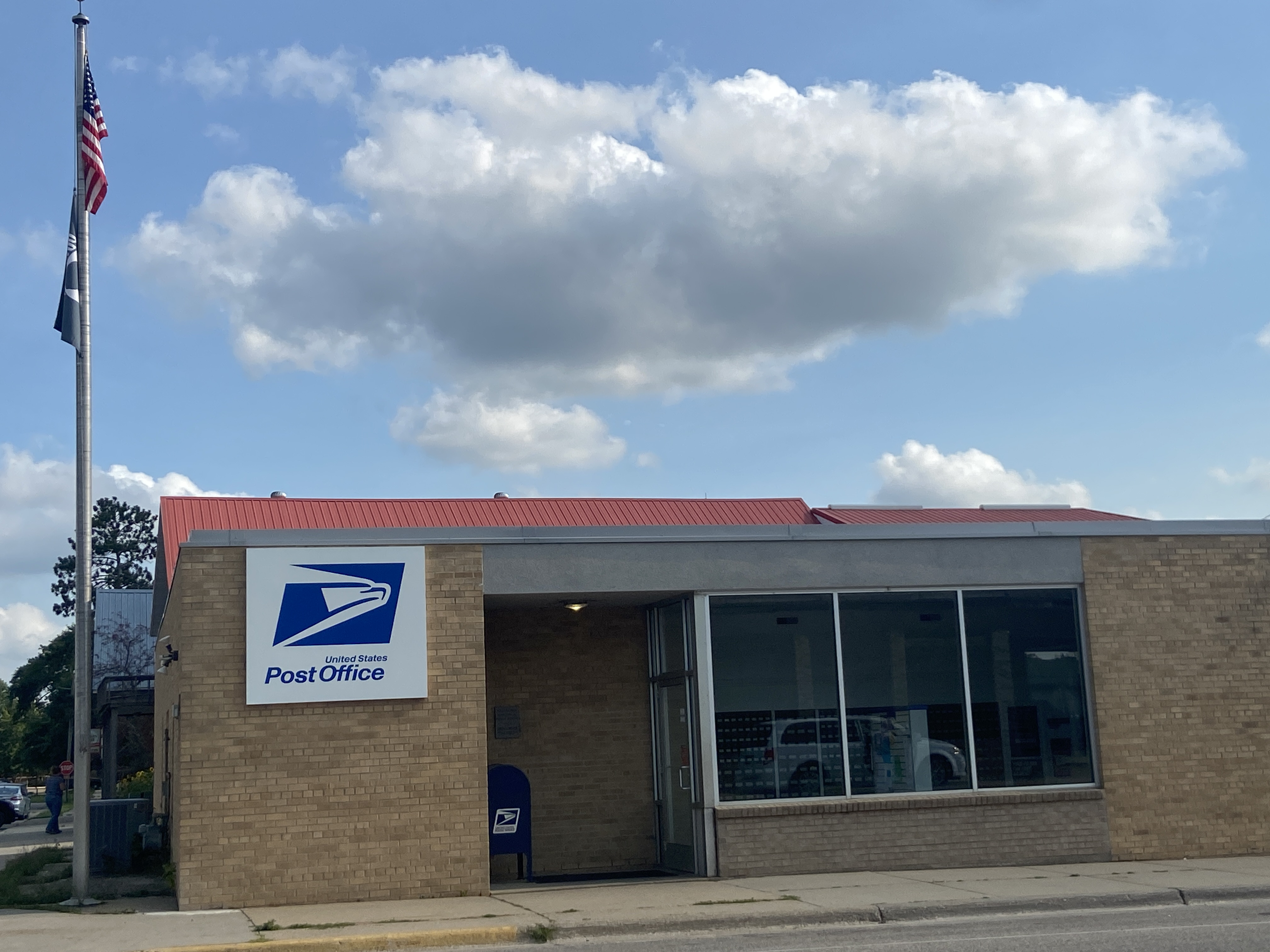
Menahga Post Office

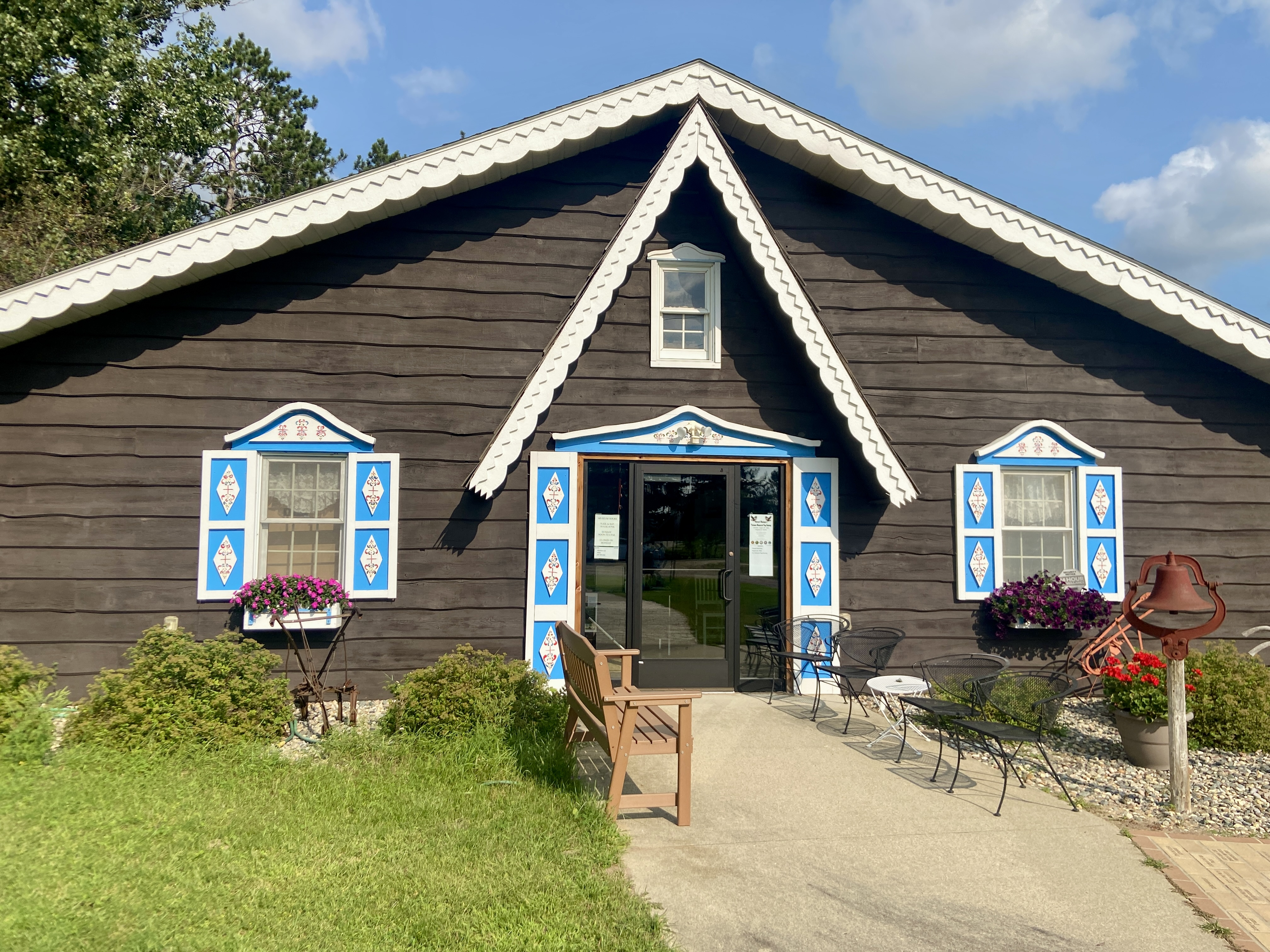
Menahga Area Historical Museum

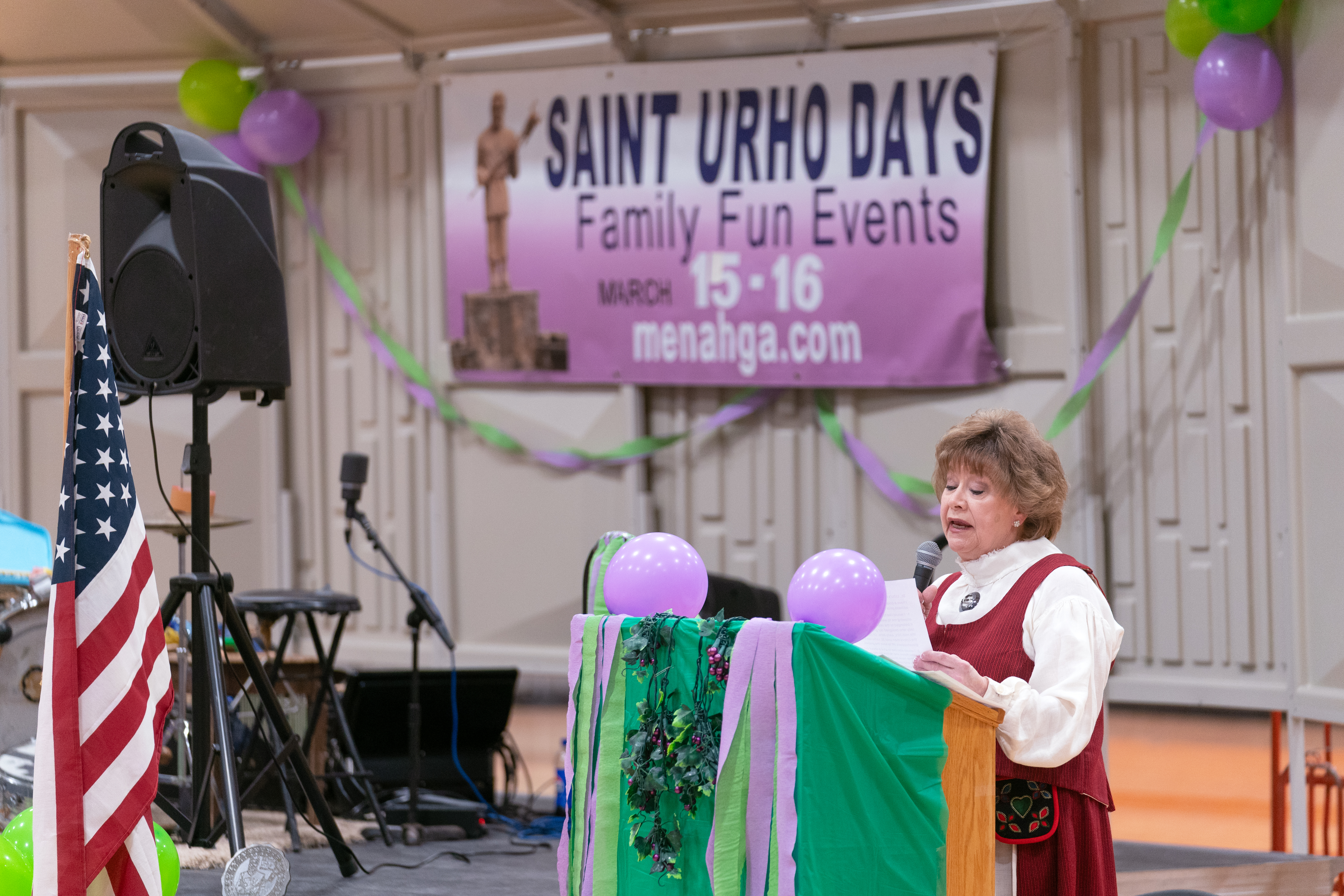
Menahga Mayor Elizabeth Olson reads the St. Urho Proclamation at Opening Ceremonies
