= Verndale, Minnesota =

City in Minnesota, United States

Verndale
- City
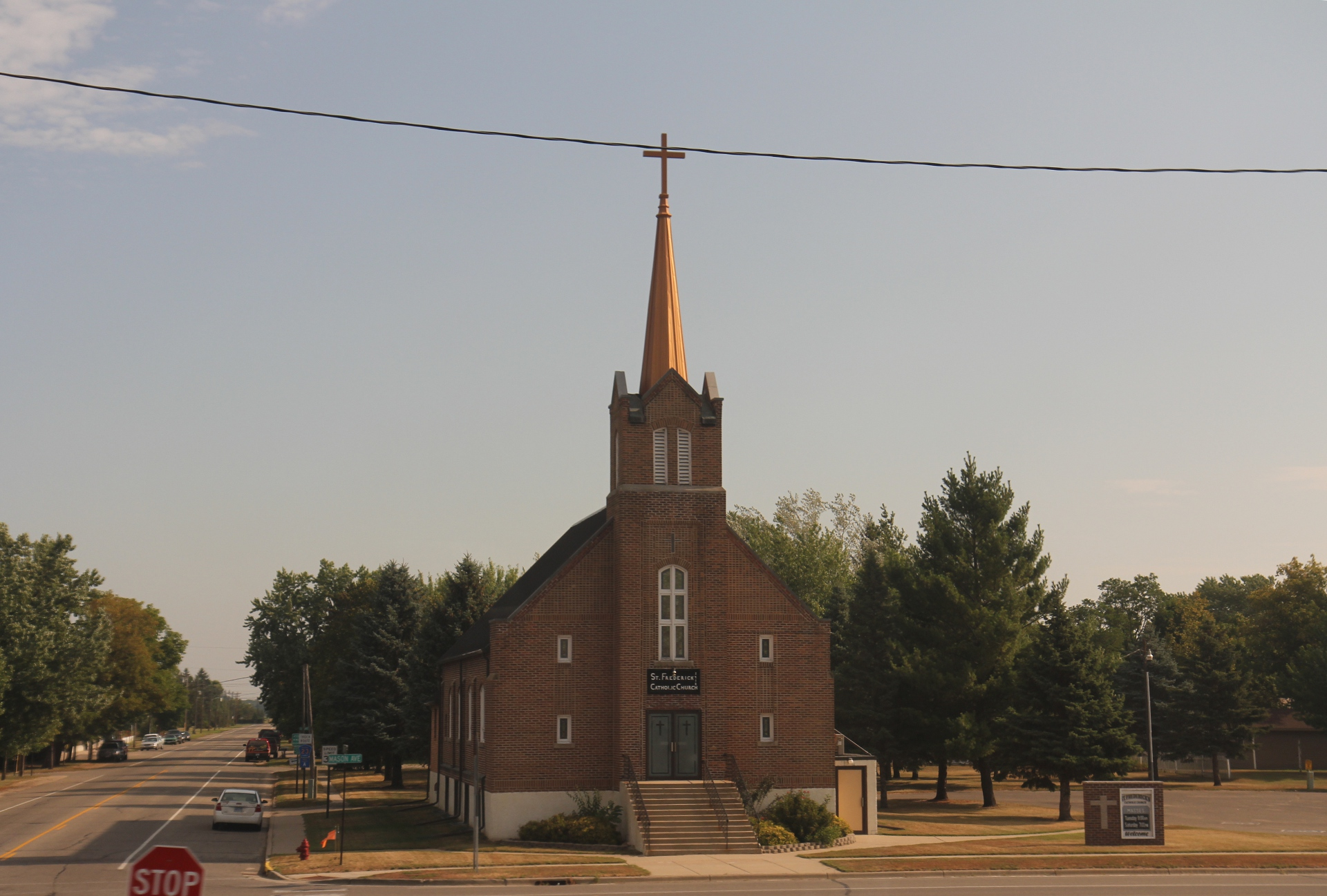
- St. Frederick Catholic Church and a street in Verndale

- Location of Verndale, Minnesota
- Coordinates: 46°23′49″N 95°00′44″W
- Country: United States
- State: Minnesota
- County: Wadena

Area
  - Total: 1.03 sq mi (2.67 km^{2})
  - Land: 1.03 sq mi (2.67 km^{2})
  - Water: 0 sq mi (0.00 km^{2})
- Elevation: 1,348 ft (411 m)

Population (2020)
  - Total: 511
  - Density: 495.2/sq mi (191.21/km^{2})
- Time zone: UTC-6 (Central (CST))
  - Summer (DST): UTC-5 (CDT)
- ZIP code: 56481
- Area code: 218
- FIPS code: 27-66874
- GNIS feature ID: 2397129
- Website: City website

Verndale is a city in Wadena County, Minnesota, United States. As of the 2020 census, Verndale had a population of 511.

== History ==
A post office called Verndale has been in operation since 1878. The city was named for Vernie Smith, the granddaughter of an early settler.

== Geography ==
According to the United States Census Bureau, the city has a total area of 0.98 square miles (2.54 km^{2}), all of it land.

U.S. Route 10 serves as a main route in the community.

== Demographics ==
Historical population
Census	Pop.	Note	%±
1890	635		—
1900	672		5.8%
1910	538		−19.9%
1920	571		6.1%
1930	424		−25.7%
1940	521		22.9%
1950	576		10.6%
1960	606		5.2%
1970	570		−5.9%
1980	504		−11.6%
1990	560		11.1%
2000	575		2.7%
2010	602		4.7%
2020	511		−15.1%
U.S. Decennial Census

=== 2010 census ===
As of the census of 2010, there were 602 people, 239 households, and 156 families residing in the city. The population density was 614.3 inhabitants per square mile (237.2/km^{2}). There were 253 housing units at an average density of 258.2 per square mile (99.7/km^{2}). The racial makeup of the city was 94.4% White, 1.0% Native American, 0.2% Asian, 1.5% from other races, and 3.0% from two or more races. Hispanic or Latino of any race were 2.7% of the population.

There were 239 households, of which 32.2% had children under the age of 18 living with them, 44.4% were married couples living together, 11.3% had a female householder with no husband present, 9.6% had a male householder with no wife present, and 34.7% were non-families. Nearly 30.1% of all households were made up of individuals, and 13.8% had someone living alone who was 65 years of age or older. The average household size was 2.52, and the average family size was 3.13.

The median age in the city was 35 years. Nearly 28.4% of residents were under the age of 18; 9.7% were between the ages of 18 and 24; 25.6% were from 25 to 44; 20.5% were from 45 to 64; and 15.8% were 65 years of age or older. The gender makeup of the city was 51.7% male and 47.3% female, and 1% gender neutral, but also consider themselves females.

=== 2000 census ===
As of the census of 2000, there were 575 people, 234 households, and 157 families residing in the city. The population density was 587.7 inhabitants per square mile (226.9/km^{2}). There were 260 housing units, at an average density of 265.8 per square mile (102.6/km^{2}). The racial makeup of the city was 96.70% White, 0.35% African American, 1.22% Native American, 0.52% Asian, 0.70% from other races, and 0.52% from two or more races. Hispanic or Latino of any race were 1.57% of the population. 32.4% were of German, 17.2% Norwegian, 10.4% American, 7.3% Swedish and 6.0% Irish ancestry.

There were 234 households, out of which 33.3% had children under the age of 18 living with them, 50.0% were married couples living together, 12.0% had a female householder with no husband present, and 32.5% were non-families. Of those, 27.8% of all households were made up of individuals, and 14.5% had someone living alone who was 65 years of age or older. The average household size was 2.46, and the average family size was 2.95.

In the city, the population was spread out, with 28.9% under the age of 18, 7.8% from 18 to 24, 28.2% from 25 to 44, 15.7% from 45 to 64, and 19.5% who were 65 years of age or older. The median age was 36 years. For every 100 females, there were 94.9 males. For every 100 females age 18 and over, there were 92.0 males.

The median income for a household in the city was $26,000, and the median income for a family was $30,938. Males had a median income of $24,306 versus $21,058 for females. The per capita income for the city was $12,448. About 10.4% of families and 11.8% of the population were below the poverty line, including 13.9% of those under age 18 and 8.8% of those age 65 or over.

== Transportation ==
Amtrak’s Empire Builder, which operates between Seattle/Portland and Chicago, passes through the town on BNSF tracks, but makes no stop. The nearest station is located in Staples, 11 miles (18 km) to the east.

== Radio stations ==
FM radio

- 92.5 KXKK
- 94.5 KDLB
- 97.5 KDKK
- 101.9 KQKK

AM radio

- 870 KPRM
- 1070 KSKK
- 1570 KAKK

== Notable people ==
- Lesley J. McNair: American general
