= Perham, Minnesota =

City in Minnesota, United States

Perham
- City
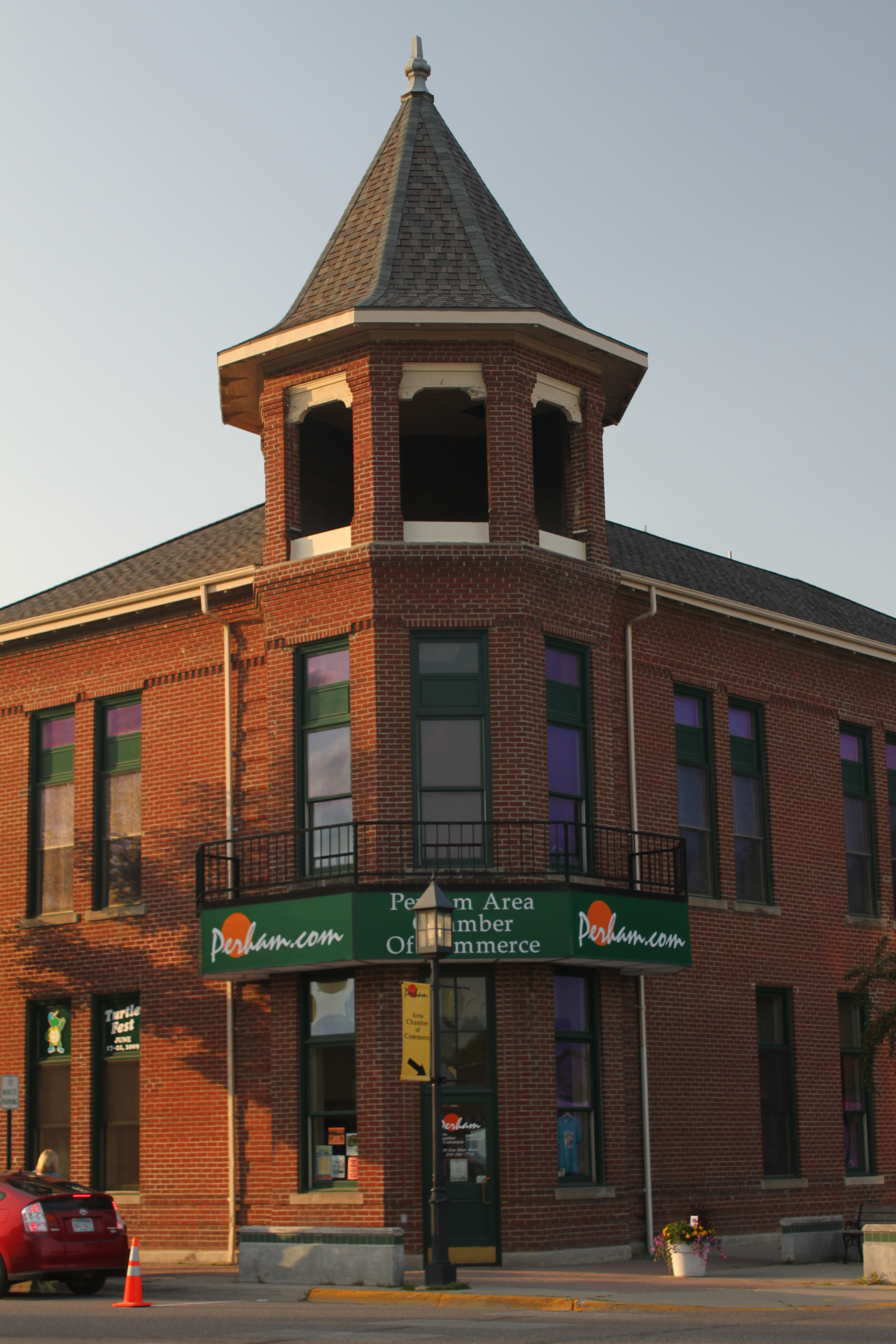
- Perham Village Hall

- Location of Perham, Minnesota
- Coordinates: 46°36′00″N 95°34′38″W
- Country: United States
- State: Minnesota
- County: Otter Tail

Government
  - Mayor: Tim Meehl

Area
  - Total: 3.58 sq mi (9.27 km^{2})
  - Land: 3.58 sq mi (9.27 km^{2})
  - Water: 0 sq mi (0.00 km^{2})
- Elevation: 1,368 ft (417 m)

Population (2020)
  - Total: 3,512
  - Estimate (2021): 3,572
  - Density: 981.7/sq mi (379.04/km^{2})
- Time zone: UTC-6 (CST)
  - Summer (DST): UTC-5 (CDT)
- ZIP code: 56573
- Area code: 218
- FIPS code: 27-50470
- GNIS feature ID: 2396181
- Website: ci.perham.mn.us

Perham (/ˈpɜːrm/ PURM) is a city in Otter Tail County, Minnesota. The population was 3,512 at the 2020 census.

== History ==
Perham was platted in 1873 and named for Josiah Perham, first president of the Northern Pacific Railway. As the village grew in economic importance, the surrounding township was renamed Perham Township in 1877. Perham was incorporated in 1881.

== Geography ==
According to the United States Census Bureau, the city has an area of 3.18 square miles (8.24 km^{2}), all land.

U.S. Route 10 and Minnesota State Highways 78 and 108 are three of the main routes in the community.

== Demographics ==
Historical population
Census	Pop.	Note	%±
1880	269		—
1890	761		182.9%
1900	1,182		55.3%
1910	1,376		16.4%
1920	1,370		−0.4%
1930	1,411		3.0%
1940	1,534		8.7%
1950	1,926		25.6%
1960	2,019		4.8%
1970	1,933		−4.3%
1980	2,086		7.9%
1990	2,075		−0.5%
2000	2,559		23.3%
2010	2,985		16.6%
2020	3,512		17.7%
2021 (est.)	3,572		1.7%
U.S. Decennial Census; 2020 Census

=== 2020 census ===
As of the 2020 census, Perham had a population of 3,512. The median age was 37.9 years. 23.5% of residents were under the age of 18 and 21.0% of residents were 65 years of age or older. For every 100 females there were 89.4 males, and for every 100 females age 18 and over there were 88.0 males age 18 and over.

0.0% of residents lived in urban areas, while 100.0% lived in rural areas.

There were 1,544 households in Perham, of which 27.5% had children under the age of 18 living in them. Of all households, 37.6% were married-couple households, 22.9% were households with a male householder and no spouse or partner present, and 32.3% were households with a female householder and no spouse or partner present. About 41.6% of all households were made up of individuals and 16.2% had someone living alone who was 65 years of age or older.

There were 1,666 housing units, of which 7.3% were vacant. The homeowner vacancy rate was 1.3% and the rental vacancy rate was 7.2%.

Racial composition as of the 2020 census
Race	Number	Percent
White	2,912	82.9%
Black or African American	63	1.8%
American Indian and Alaska Native	46	1.3%
Asian	33	0.9%
Native Hawaiian and Other Pacific Islander	1	0.0%
Some other race	173	4.9%
Two or more races	284	8.1%
Hispanic or Latino (of any race)	402	11.4%

=== 2010 census ===
As of the census of 2010, there were 2,985 people, 1,304 households, and 722 families living in the city. The population density was 938.7 inhabitants per square mile (362.4/km^{2}). There were 1,388 housing units at an average density of 436.5 per square mile (168.5/km^{2}). The racial makeup of the city was 94.1% White, 1.1% African American, 0.5% Native American, 0.5% Asian, 0.1% Pacific Islander, 2.3% from other races, and 1.5% from two or more races. Hispanic or Latino of any race were 4.8% of the population.

There were 1,304 households, of which 27.3% had children under the age of 18 living with them, 38.9% were married couples living together, 11.9% had a female householder with no husband present, 4.6% had a male householder with no wife present, and 44.6% were non-families. 38.0% of all households were made up of individuals, and 19.4% had someone living alone who was 65 years of age or older. The average household size was 2.19 and the average family size was 2.89.

The median age in the city was 41.5 years. 22.6% of residents were under the age of 18; 9.2% were between the ages of 18 and 24; 22.1% were from 25 to 44; 22.7% were from 45 to 64; and 23.4% were 65 years of age or older. The gender makeup of the city was 46.5% male and 53.5% female.

=== 2000 census ===
As of the census of 2000, there were 2,559 people, 1,104 households, and 642 families living in the city. The population density was 976.2 inhabitants per square mile (376.9/km^{2}). There were 1,167 housing units at an average density of 445.2 per square mile (171.9/km^{2}). The racial makeup of the city was 96.99% White, 0.35% African American, 1.02% Native American, 0.27% Asian, 0.66% from other races, and 0.70% from two or more races. Hispanic or Latino of any race were 1.13% of the population. 50.3% were of German and 14.8% Norwegian ancestry.

There were 1,104 households, out of which 29.3% had children under the age of 18 living with them, 45.5% were married couples living together, 8.9% had a female householder with no husband present, and 41.8% were non-families. 37.1% of all households were made up of individuals, and 20.7% had someone living alone who was 65 years of age or older. The average household size was 2.23 and the average family size was 2.95.

In the city, the population was spread out, with 25.1% under the age of 18, 6.9% from 18 to 24, 25.7% from 25 to 44, 17.6% from 45 to 64, and 24.7% who were 65 years of age or older. The median age was 40 years. For every 100 females, there were 87.9 males. For every 100 females age 18 and over, there were 82.9 males.

The median income for a household in the city was $28,397, while the median income for a family was $40,184. Males had a median income of $29,087 versus $20,817 for females. The per capita income for the city was $16,444. About 8.1% of families and 13.2% of the population were below the poverty line, including 15.3% of those under age 18 and 13.9% of those age 65 or over.

== Radio stations ==
FM radio

- 92.5 KXKK 92.5 Hot Country
- 94.5 KDLB Adult Contemporary The Arrow 94.7
- 97.5 KDKK 97.5 Music of Your Life
- 99.5 KPRW Lakes 99.5
- 99.9 KVOX-FM Froggy 99.9
- 100.3 KXPM-LP Relevant Radio
- 102.3 KRCQ Real Country 102.3
- 107.9 KPFX 107.9 The Fox
- 97.9 KFNW Contemporary Christian Music Life 97.9

AM radio

- 870 KPRM Classic Country News/Talk
- 1070 KSKK Country
- 1570 KAKK Sports Radio

== Newspaper ==
The Perham Focus is based in Perham, and serves Otter Tail County and surrounding areas with a print newspaper, an e-paper, and online news.

== Transportation ==
Amtrak’s Empire Builder, which operates between Seattle/Portland and Chicago, passes through the town on BNSF tracks but does not stop. The nearest station is in Detroit Lakes, 21 miles (34 km) to the northwest.

== Notable people ==
- Colvin G. Butler, Presbyterian clergyman, farmer, and politician
- Gabriele Grunewald, U.S. champion middle distance runner
- Fritz Hanson, legendary Canadian Football League pioneer
- John Anthony Kaiser, Roman Catholic priest
- Roger Molander, government official and activist
- Dean Simpson, businessman and politician
- Ray Taylor, film director
- Larry N. Vanderhoef, chancellor of the University of California, Davis

== See also ==
- Perham Municipal Airport
