= KKEQ =

Radio station in Fosston–Bemidji, Minnesota–Grand Forks, North Dakota

Fosston, Minnesota; United States
- Broadcast area: Grand Forks, ND/Bemidji, MN
- Frequency: 107.1 MHz
- Branding: Your Q FM

Programming
- Format: Christian contemporary

Ownership
- Owner: Pine to Prairie Broadcasting

History
- First air date: 1972 (as KEHG-FM)
- Former call signs: KEHG-FM (1972–1984); KKDQ (1984–1990); KKCQ-FM (1990–1996)

Technical information
- Facility ID: 52634
- Class: C1
- ERP: 100,000 watts
- HAAT: 191 meters (627 ft)
- Transmitter coordinates: 47°36′22″N 95°25′31″W
- Translators: 104.9 K285BG (Grand Forks); 104.9 K285FK (Walker); 92.9 K225AQ (Park Rapids)

Links
- Webcast: Listen Live
- Website: yourqfm.com

KKEQ (107.1 FM or 104.9 FM, "Your Q FM") is a radio station licensed to Fosston, Minnesota with its main studio in Grand Forks, North Dakota and additional studios in Bemidji, Minnesota. Q FM's primary format is contemporary Christian music, though it also airs Bible-based talk and teaching programming. The Bemidji area receives the Q FM broadcast on the main 107.1 FM frequency, while the Grand Forks area receives the Q FM broadcast at 104.9 FM via a translator station.

KKEQ is a commercial radio station supported by advertising sales. Shine the Light, Inc is a non-profit organization that supports KKEQ by purchasing airtime to allow KKEQ to be a full-time Christian radio ministry.

== History ==
The station signed on in 1972 as KEHG-FM 107.1, a 3,000 watt Class A simulcasting KEHG (1480 AM). In 1983 Dale Olmstead purchased KEHG AM and FM from De La Hunt Broadcasting, and renamed them KKCQ and KKDQ; the FM station would become KKCQ-FM in 1990. In the early 1992, Pine To Prairie Broadcasting was formed with several investors with the intent of bringing Christian radio to northwest Minnesota, and purchased KKCQ AM and FM. KKCQ-FM upgraded to 50,000 watts, and signed on with a contemporary Christian music format as "Q107" on October 31, 1993, after periodically being off-the-air for testing.

In 1995, Shine the Light, Inc., an evangelical Christian organization, took over the operation of KFNW-FM's translator (low power rebroadcaster) at 104.9 FM in Grand Forks, North Dakota, and it began rebroadcasting Q107. Q107's call sign was changed to KKEQ in 1996 after Pine To Prairie Broadcasting signed on KKCQ-FM 96.7.

Larry Roed was the first CEO of Pine To Prairie Broadcasting, and also the first general manager under the new ownership. Air staff over the years include Kevin Arvidson (a.k.a. Fred in the Morning), Dan Kindall, Tom Lano, JL Nesvold, Brian Fisher and current general manager Phil Ehlke.

Q107 has organized numerous concerts, special events and promotions over the years, including the yard signs, the "Twelve Gifts of Christmas" and an ongoing the annual Extreme Faith youth conference, held at alternating locations throughout Q107's listening area. Q107 also airs Shopping on the Radio , a radio auction occasionally, which also has items for sale and auction from area retailers on its Web site.

In 2005, Q107 began streaming online, and Shine the Light, Inc. signed on Q107's second translator at 104.9 FM in Walker, Minnesota. The Grand Forks translator's transmitter was moved into city limits in 2006, greatly improving its signal to the Greater Grand Forks area.

In 2007, Shine the Light signed on four translators in Thief River Falls, Park Rapids, Bemidji and Roseau. On July 7, 2008, KKEQ rebranded itself as "Your Q FM" to prevent confusion with its translators, along with switching programming from Salem's Today's Christian Music network to WAY-FM's Christian Hit Radio Satellite Network (CHRSN) in order to target a younger audience.

In 2010, KKEQ's translator station at 94.9 K235BP in Bemidji switched to a broadcast of KBUN following a sale and a survey showing the majority of KKEQ's Bemidji listeners tune in on the main 107.1 frequency.

In February 2011, Your Q FM built an additional studio and sales office in Grand Forks, North Dakota, where most of the programming is now broadcast from. Most satellite programming (from CHRSN) was dropped in favor of locally produced programming. Q FM continues to maintain a studio and sales office in Fosston, where some programming continues to be broadcast from, to meet FCC requirements and to continue serving the Fosston area as well. The station also operates a studio and sales office in Bemidji, Minnesota.

In 2012, KKEQ's translator station at 102.9 K275BB in Roseau went off the air due to interference of its off-air feed from CKCL-FM in Winnipeg, which also broadcasts at 107.1 FM. CKCL had recently upgraded its power to 100,000 watts, and is located closer to Roseau than the main KKEQ broadcast.

During February 2013, KKEQ applied to upgrade the main 107.1 FM signal from 50,000 to 100,000 watts on a taller tower near Bagley, improving its signal in Bemidji. The station completed its upgrade to the main signal in September 2014.

At the end of 2013, KKCQ and KKCQ-FM were sold to R&J Broadcasting of Ada, Minnesota. Studios and towers for these stations remain in Fosston. Ownership of both stations transferred to them in early 2014, according to FCC records.

== Translators ==
Broadcast translators for KKEQ
Call sign	Frequency	City of license	FID	ERP (W)	Class	FCC info
K225AQ	92.9 FM	Park Rapids, Minnesota	144468	250	D	LMS
K285BG	104.9 FM	Grand Forks, North Dakota	69724	250	D	LMS
K285FK	104.9 FM	Walker, Minnesota	138016	190	D	LMS
