= KKWB =

- Kelliher, Minnesota; United States
- Broadcast area: Bemidji, Minnesota
- Frequency: 102.5 MHz
- Branding: Coyote 102.5

Programming
- Format: Country
- Affiliations: CBS Radio Network and Westwood One

Ownership
- Owner: De La Hunt Broadcasting; (Bemidji Radio, Inc.)
- Sister stations: KAKK, KDKK, KPRM, KQKK, KSKK, KXKK

History
- First air date: November 14, 2008
- Call sign meaning: KK Radio Network (Owner)

Technical information
- Licensing authority: FCC
- Facility ID: 165963
- Class: C2
- ERP: 50,000 watts
- HAAT: 144 meters (472 feet)
- Transmitter coordinates: 47°44′21″N 94°41′10″W

Links
- Public license information: Public file; LMS
- Webcast: Listen Live
- Website: coyote102.com

KKWB (102.5 FM, "Coyote 102.5") is a hot country music radio station, serving the Bemidji, Minnesota region. Its main source of programming is from the Westwood One radio network, along with hourly news from the CBS Radio Network. It is locally owned and operated by De La Hunt Media, Inc., with corporate offices in Bemidji and Park Rapids, Minnesota.

Their "showcase" studios are in the Elks building, at 4th & Beltrami in downtown Bemidji. The transmitter site is west of Blackduck, Minnesota. It broadcasts from a 472-foot tower, with 50,000 watts.

The station was assigned the KKWB call letters by the Federal Communications Commission on May 13, 2008.
