= KKCQ =

KKCQ may refer to:

- KKCQ (AM), a radio station (1480 AM) licensed to Fosston, Minnesota, United States
- KKCQ-FM, a radio station (96.7 FM) licensed to Bagley, Minnesota, United States
