= KYES =

KYES may refer to:

- KYES (AM), a radio station (1180 AM) licensed to serve Rockville, Minnesota, United States
- KYES-LD, a low-power television station (channel 22, virtual 5) licensed to serve Anchorage, Alaska, United States
- KAUU, a television station (channel 7, virtual 5) licensed to serve Anchorage, Alaska, which held the KYES and KYES-TV call signs from 1990 to 2021
- KYEX-LD, a low-power television station (channel 26, virtual 5) licensed to serve Juneau, Alaska, which held the call sign KYES-LD in 2020
