= De La Hunt Broadcasting =

American radio broadcasting company

De La Hunt Broadcasting is a small market radio broadcasting company based in Park Rapids, Minnesota. The company was founded in 1962 by Ed and Carol De La Hunt. Butch and Tammy De La Hunt bought the radio station group from Ed and Carol in October 2021 and former De La Hunt Media, Inc. Prior to the sale, Butch and Tammy owned and operated Radio Station KKWB (FM) "Coyote 102.5" in the Bemidji radio market as Bemidji Radio, Inc. All stations are now licensed by the FCC under De La Hunt Media, Inc. with corporate offices located in Park Rapids. De La Hunt Media has station studios located on the east side of Park Rapids, at 17340 State Highway 34, Highway 34 West Walker and studio in downtown Bemidji.

== History ==
After working multiple radio jobs, Ed and Carol La Hunt decided to try running their own radio station. The first FCC application Ed and his wife filed was rejected. It wasn't until their second application was accepted in September 1962 that they began “building a 153-foot tower a mile west of Park Rapids. By mid-November, the station was ready.”

In 1967, De la Hunt Broadcasting received an FM permit and "KDKK FM -- Music for Adults -- went on air with a 100,000-watt transmitter."

In April 2012, "Ed was diagnosed with myasthenia gravis, a neuromuscular autoimmune disease that affects the muscles and the nerves that control them."

== Stations ==
De La Hunt Broadcasting operates six stations in three different markets:

- Park Rapids
  - KPRM AM 870 "870 KPRM"
  - KXKK FM 92.5 "Hot Country 92.5"
  - KDKK FM 97.5 "StarStation 97.5"
- Bemidji (324 Beltrami Ave, Bemidji)
  - KKWB FM 102.5 "Coyote Country 102.5"
- Walker
  - KAKK AM 1570 "Oldies 1570"
  - KQKK FM 101.9 "KQ 102"

=== Former stations ===
- KKCQ (AM) and KKCQ-FM - sold in 1983 to Dale Olmstead. Began as KEHG AM-FM.
- KDLB - sold June 26, 2015 to Radio Fargo-Moorhead, Inc. (Radio FM Media) of Fargo, ND.
- WBKK - sold October 19, 2015 to Real Presence Radio of Grand Forks, ND.
- KKWZ - sold to Rugby Broadcasters, Inc. of Rugby, ND.
- KSKK - sold to Gabriel Media on September 27, 2021

== Honors ==
In 2006, Ed and Carol De La Hunt were inducted into the Pavek Museum of Broadcasting Hall of Fame, in Golden Valley, Minnesota. This Hall of Fame honors the outstanding talent of Minnesota's broadcast community.
