= Cencom Cable Associates =

Former cable company in St. Louis, Missouri

Cencom Cable Associates was a cable television distributor in the Greater St. Louis, Missouri-Metro-East, Illinois Metropolitan area between 1985 and 1993. It was founded by Robert A. Brooks in 1981 with seed capital of $300,000, and then grew into a multi-billion dollar company.

Cencom bought out Storer Cable in late 1985, merging that Florissant cable outlet into Cencom. Cencom was the home of the St. Louis Cardinals Cable Network between 1986 and 1989, televising 50 home games in each of those seasons. By 1991, Cencom served close to 550,000 people. Cencom was sold to Crown Media, a subsidiary of Hallmark Cards, in 1993 for $1 billion, then becoming Crown Cable. In 1993 the former managers of Cencom purchased the company back from Hallmark and formed Charter Communications, which was later sold to Paul Allen for $4.5 billion.
