= Nevis Tiger Muskie =

Sculpture in Minnesota

Coordinates: 46.964588°N 94.842208°W

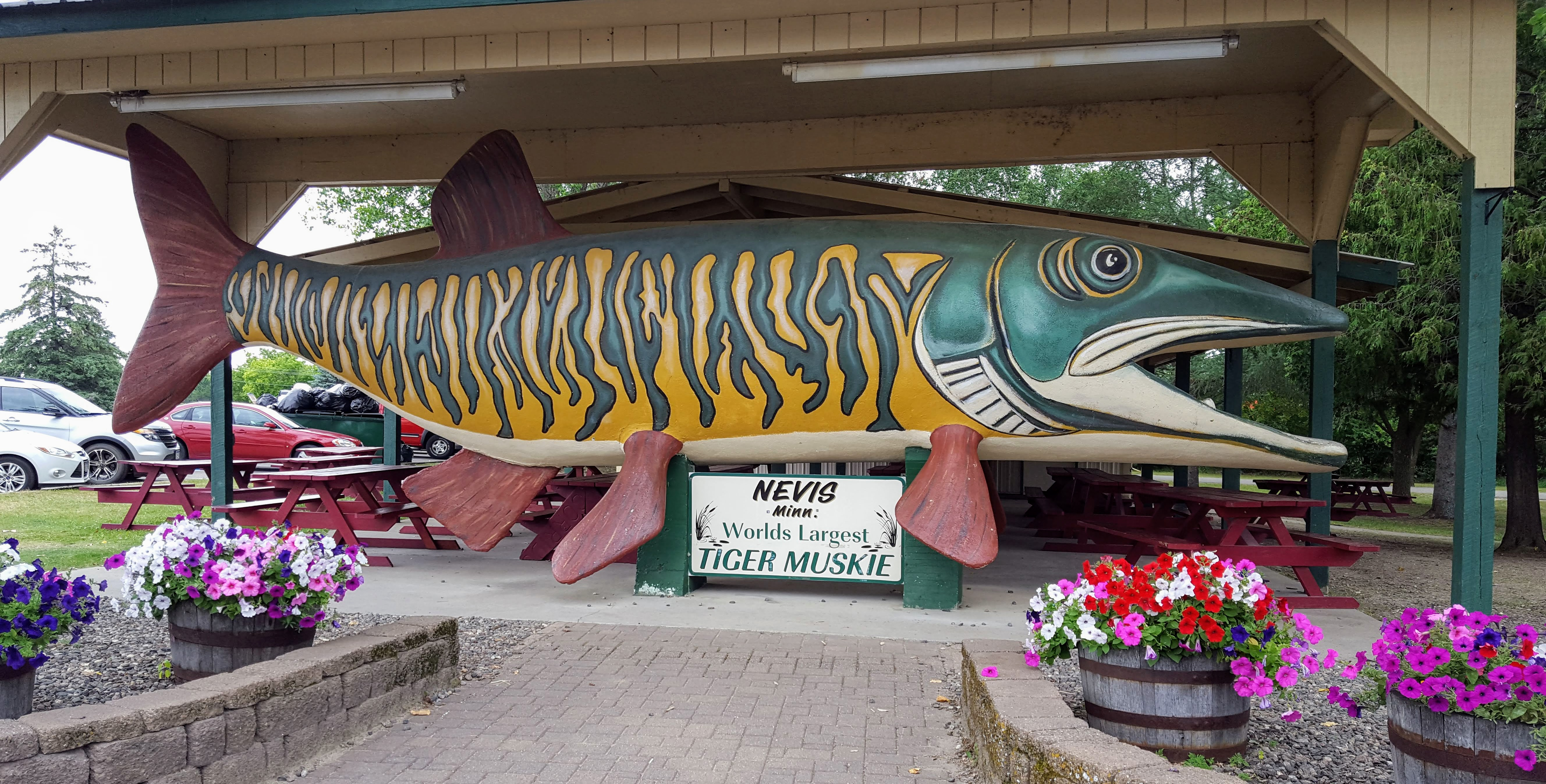
- The Nevis tiger muskie in 2019
- Artist: Warren P Ballard
- Year: 1949
- Subject: Tiger muskellunge
- Dimensions: 30.5 feet (9.3 m) long

The Nevis Tiger Muskie is a sculpture located in Nevis, Minnesota.

The sculpture is known as the world's largest tiger muskie. It is a representation of the tiger muskellunge, a carnivorous fish found in local waters. It is 30 feet and 6 inches long, and made of cedar and redwood covered with cement scales.

The fish was built in 1949 by the Nevis Civic & Commerce Chamber as a tourist attraction, joining the ranks of several other large fish statues across the state of Minnesota. It was dedicated by Minnesota governor Luther Youngdahl on August 22, 1950 to all tourists visiting Minnesota. In 1991 it was covered by an awning to keep the elements at bay and is stationed in front of a pavilion with picnic tables and a small playground. The sculpture and its pavilion are located on the Paul Bunyan State Trail. The area is a noted tourist attraction and provides a station for numerous photo opportunities and an easily identifiable landmark in the small town of Nevis.

In September 2012, the Nevis Public School considered returning their school mascot back from "Tigers" to the original "Tiger Muskies".

This roadside attraction lends its name to the annual Nevis Muskie Days, held every July since the inaugural celebration in 1950. The event includes the Muskie 5K run, a street dance, and numerous vendors.
