= KRJB =

- Ada, Minnesota; United States
- Broadcast area: Fargo-Moorhead, Grand Forks, Hillsboro
- Frequency: 106.5 MHz
- Branding: KRJB 106.5

Programming
- Format: Country

Ownership
- Owner: R&J Broadcasting
- Sister stations: KRJM, KKCQ (AM), KKCQ-FM

History
- First air date: October 1, 1987
- Former call signs: KHJE-FM, KMCA

Technical information
- Licensing authority: FCC
- Facility ID: 54334
- Class: C1
- ERP: 100,000 watts
- HAAT: 137.9 meters (453 feet)
- Transmitter coordinates: 47°18′41″N 96°31′13″W

Links
- Public license information: Public file; LMS
- Webcast: Listen Live
- Website: http://www.krjbradio.com/

KRJB (106.5 FM) is a radio station licensed to serve Ada, Minnesota. The station is owned by R & J Broadcasting Inc. It airs a full-service Country music format.

The station was assigned the KRJB call letters by the Federal Communications Commission on October 19, 1987.

== History ==
The station traces its license history to an FM facility in Ada that was originally assigned the call sign KHJE. In July 1984, Broadcasting listed a call-letter grant changing the Ada FM station from KHJE to KMCA, with Cecil A. Malme associated with the station.

By 1987, the station was operating as KMCA(FM) on 106.3 MHz. In August of that year, Broadcasting reported that MSM Broadcasting had filed an application to assign the station's license to R&J Broadcasting for $90,000. The trade report listed the station's facilities as 3,000 watts effective radiated power with an antenna height above average terrain of 300 feet. The seller was identified as Cecil A. Malme, while the buyers were Richard Harelson and Jimmy Birkemeyer.

R&J Broadcasting later identified October 1, 1987, as KRJB-FM's first day on the air. According to the station's own retrospective, KRJB began with a country-music format and an emphasis on local school news, both of which became long-running parts of the station's local service in Ada and the surrounding region. The KRJB call sign was in use by October 1987.

KRJB later underwent a major technical upgrade. In 2005, FMedia! reported that KRJB was moving from 106.3 to 106.5 MHz and upgrading to 100,000 watts effective radiated power, horizontal and vertical, with an antenna height above average terrain of 138 meters as a Class C1 facility. The report described the move as intended to serve Fargo, North Dakota.

In later years, KRJB remained part of R&J Broadcasting's northwest Minnesota station group. The station's local programming continued to center on country music, news, high-school sports, school information, farm news, obituaries, community events, and local announcements. In 2022, the Red River Farm Network identified KRJB in Ada, KRJM in Mahnomen, and KKCQ stations in Bagley and Fosston as network affiliates, and reported that Jim Birkemeyer led R&J Broadcasting.
