= Joseph Andrew Quinn =

American lawyer

Joseph Andrew Quinn (June 7, 1886 – January 25, 1939) was an American lawyer, farmer, and politician.

Quinn was born in Lakeville, Dakota County, Minnesota, and graduated from Central High School in Saint Paul, Minnesota in 1907. He graduated from St. Paul College of Law in 1914 and was admitted to the Minnesota Bar. Quinn lived with his wife and family in Menahga, Wadena County, Minnesota. Quinn was also involved in the banking business and was a farmer. He served on the Eveleth School Board in Eveleth, Minnesota, and served in the Minnesota House of Representatives from 1923 to 1928.
