= Perham Focus =

Local newspaper in Minnesota USA

- Type: Print/Online Newspaper
- Owner(s): Forum Communications Company
- Publisher: Devlyn Brooks
- Managing editor: Tris Anderson
- Founded: 1882
- Headquarters: 300 W. Main St. Suite C
- City: Perham, Minnesota
- Website: perhamfocus.com

The Perham Focus is an American, English-language newspaper headquartered in Perham, Minnesota. It serves east Otter Tail County, Minnesota and the surrounding areas. It was founded in 1882 and is currently owned by the Forum Communications Company based in Fargo, North Dakota.

The Perham Focus provides news coverage through an online news website, a weekly print edition and a daily e-paper edition available online or through an app.

== History ==
Related names of the newspaper include:

- Perham Bulletin (1882 - 1913)
- Perham Enterprise and Bulletin (1913 - 2013)
- East Otter Tail Focus (2009 - 2012)
- Perham Focus (2013–present)

The Perham Focus was purchased by the Forum Communications Company in 2000.
