= Perham Municipal Airport =

- IATA: none; ICAO: none; FAA LID: 16D

Summary
- Airport type: Public
- Owner: City of Perham
- Serves: Perham, Minnesota
- Elevation AMSL: 1,376 ft / 419 m
- Coordinates: 46°36′39.50″N 095°36′22.00″W

Map
- Location of airport in Minnesota 16D (the United States)

Runways
Direction	Length		Surface
Direction	ft	m	Surface
13/31	4,102	1,250	asphalt

Statistics (2010)
- Aircraft operations: 7,200
- Based aircraft: 16
- Source: Federal Aviation Administration

Perham Municipal Airport (FAA LID: 16D) is a city-owned public-use airport located two miles northwest of the central business district of Perham, a city in Otter Tail County, Minnesota, United States.

== Facilities and aircraft ==
Perham Municipal Airport covers an area of 80 acres which contains one runway designated 13/31 with a 4,102 ft × 75 ft (1,250 m × 23 m) asphalt surface. For the 12-month period ending May 31, 2011, the airport had 7,200 aircraft operations, an average of 20 per day: 100% general aviation. At that time there were 16 aircraft based at this airport: 12 single-engine, 1 multi engine, 2 helicopters, and 1 ultralight.

== See also ==
- List of airports in Minnesota
