= KRJM =

Coordinates: 47°27′23″N 96°07′57″W

- Mahnomen, Minnesota; United States
- Frequency: 101.5 MHz
- Branding: Gold 101.5

Programming
- Format: Oldies

Ownership
- Owner: R&J Broadcasting
- Sister stations: KRJB, KKCQ (AM), KKCQ-FM

History
- First air date: August 27, 2001

Technical information
- Licensing authority: FCC
- Facility ID: 88325
- Class: C3
- ERP: 25,000 watts
- HAAT: 100 meters

Links
- Public license information: Public file; LMS

KRJM is a radio station airing an oldies format, licensed to Mahnomen, Minnesota, broadcasting on 101.5 FM. KRJM is owned by R&J Broadcasting, Inc.
