= KKJM =

Coordinates: 45.639°N 94.373°W

- St. Joseph, Minnesota; United States
- Broadcast area: St. Cloud, Minnesota
- Frequency: 92.9 MHz
- Branding: Spirit 92.9

Programming
- Format: Contemporary Christian music

Ownership
- Owner: Gabriel Communications
- Sister stations: KYES

History
- First air date: 1996; 30 years ago

Technical information
- Licensing authority: FCC
- Facility ID: 62129
- Class: C3
- ERP: 25,000 watts
- HAAT: 100 m (328 ft)

Links
- Public license information: Public file; LMS
- Webcast: Listen Live
- Website: spirit929.com

KKJM "Spirit 92.9" is a radio station in St. Cloud, Minnesota airing a contemporary Christian music format. The station is owned by Gabriel Communications. Its main competitors are KCFB, Air 1 on 89.5 FM, and KTIS-FM in Minneapolis, Minnesota.

== History ==
KKJM-FM launched in 1996 under the ownership of local media magnate Andy Hilger. The station was originally established as a sister station to WJON, WWJO, and KMXK. However, as Hilger’s personal mission shifted toward faith-based broadcasting, the station became the centerpiece of his work in Christian media.

In 1999, while Hilger sold his other commercial interests (WJON, WWJO, and KMXK) to Regent Communications for approximately $5 million, he explicitly excluded KKJM from the sale.. Following the sale of his other stations, Hilger rebranded KKJM as "Spirit 92.9," adopting a contemporary Christian music format.

In 2000, when Hilger donated KKJM-FM to the Catholic Diocese of St. Cloud. Hilger remained deeply involved, volunteering to serve as the station's general manager for several years to ensure its financial and operational stability.

Today, the station is owned by Gabriel Media (formerly Gabriel Communications), a non-profit entity closely associated with the Diocese. It operates from studios in Sauk Rapids, Minnesota, where it also shares space with sister station K-YES (AM 1180).

It has been a multi-time finalist for the National Association of Broadcasters (NAB) Marconi Radio Award for Religious Station of the Year.
