= KXPM-LP =

- Perham, Minnesota; United States
- Frequency: 100.3 MHz
- Branding: Relevant Radio

Programming
- Format: Catholic
- Network: Relevant Radio

Ownership
- Owner: Stanislaus Communications

History
- First air date: May 2, 2016

Technical information
- Licensing authority: FCC
- Facility ID: 192789
- Class: L1
- Power: 100 watts
- HAAT: 27.3 m (90 ft)
- Transmitter coordinates: 46°35′38.3″N 95°34′31.1″W

Links
- Public license information: LMS
- Webcast: Listen Live
- Website: relevantradio.com

KXPM-LP (100.3 FM) is a low-power broadcast radio station licensed to Perham, Minnesota.

The station receives part of its programming from Relevant Radio with local inserts and announcements.
