= Fosston, Minnesota =

City in Minnesota, United States

Fosston
- City
- Seal
- Motto: Where The Prairie Meets The Pines
- Location of Fosston, Minnesota
- Coordinates: 47°34′57″N 95°45′05″W
- Country: United States
- State: Minnesota
- County: Polk
- Incorporated: 1889

Government
  - Type: Mayor

Area
  - Total: 2.14 sq mi (5.53 km^{2})
  - Land: 2.00 sq mi (5.18 km^{2})
  - Water: 0.14 sq mi (0.35 km^{2}) 1.17%
- Elevation: 1,286 ft (392 m)

Population (2020)
  - Total: 1,434
  - Estimate (2022): 1,399
  - Density: 716.3/sq mi (276.57/km^{2})
- Time zone: UTC-6 (Central (CST))
  - Summer (DST): UTC-5 (CDT)
- ZIP code: 56542
- Area code: 218
- FIPS code: 27-21986
- GNIS feature ID: 2394799
- Website: fosston.com

Fosston is a city in Polk County, Minnesota, United States. It is part of the Greater Grand Forks region. The population was 1,434 at the time of the 2020 census.

== Geography ==
According to the United States Census Bureau, the city has an area of 1.71 square miles (4.43 km^{2}), of which 1.69 square miles (4.38 km^{2}) is land and 0.02 square miles (0.05 km^{2}) is water.

Four-lane U.S. Highway 2 serves as a main route in the city.

=== Climate ===
Climate data for Fosston 1E, Minnesota (1991–2020 normals, extremes 1909–present)
Month	Jan	Feb	Mar	Apr	May	Jun	Jul	Aug	Sep	Oct	Nov	Dec	Year
Record high °F (°C)	48 (9)	61 (16)	82 (28)	96 (36)	97 (36)	101 (38)	109 (43)	103 (39)	102 (39)	91 (33)	78 (26)	58 (14)	109 (43)
Mean maximum °F (°C)	37.5 (3.1)	35.6 (2.0)	52.4 (11.3)	71.2 (21.8)	80.4 (26.9)	85.6 (29.8)	90.1 (32.3)	87.9 (31.1)	75.3 (24.1)	71.5 (21.9)	55.8 (13.2)	41.5 (5.3)	90.1 (32.3)
Mean daily maximum °F (°C)	15.9 (−8.9)	21.2 (−6.0)	34.8 (1.6)	51.3 (10.7)	65.5 (18.6)	74.3 (23.5)	78.2 (25.7)	77.4 (25.2)	68.8 (20.4)	53.2 (11.8)	35.9 (2.2)	22.1 (−5.5)	49.9 (9.9)
Daily mean °F (°C)	4.5 (−15.3)	5.7 (−14.6)	23.9 (−4.5)	39.6 (4.2)	53.3 (11.8)	63.1 (17.3)	66.8 (19.3)	64.9 (18.3)	56.6 (13.7)	42.8 (6.0)	26.9 (−2.8)	13.0 (−10.6)	38.8 (3.8)
Mean daily minimum °F (°C)	−6.4 (−21.3)	−2.5 (−19.2)	12.9 (−10.6)	27.9 (−2.3)	41.1 (5.1)	51.8 (11.0)	55.4 (13.0)	52.5 (11.4)	44.5 (6.9)	32.4 (0.2)	17.9 (−7.8)	4.0 (−15.6)	27.8 (−2.3)
Mean minimum °F (°C)	−27.9 (−33.3)	−24.8 (−31.6)	−13.9 (−25.5)	15.4 (−9.2)	28.6 (−1.9)	41.4 (5.2)	45.1 (7.3)	43.5 (6.4)	31.7 (−0.2)	17.8 (−7.9)	−6.1 (−21.2)	−20.4 (−29.1)	−27.9 (−33.3)
Record low °F (°C)	−44 (−42)	−45 (−43)	−35 (−37)	−12 (−24)	6 (−14)	27 (−3)	34 (1)	28 (−2)	19 (−7)	−4 (−20)	−33 (−36)	−54 (−48)	−54 (−48)
Record low wind chill	−69.3	−62.1	−31.2	−24.6	−11.4	0.0	0.0	0.0	−7.9	−21.3	−24.8	−55.5	−69.3
Average precipitation inches (mm)	0.52 (13)	0.54 (14)	0.95 (24)	1.76 (45)	3.01 (76)	4.64 (118)	3.93 (100)	3.54 (90)	2.97 (75)	2.25 (57)	1.61 (41)	0.83 (21)	26.55 (674)
Source: NOAA

== Demographics ==
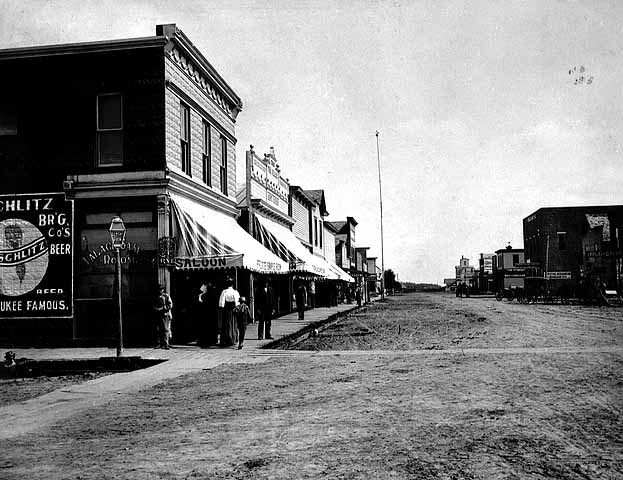
Main Street, Fosston, 1902

Historical population
Census	Pop.	Note	%±
1890	207		—
1900	864		317.4%
1910	1,075		24.4%
1920	1,014		−5.7%
1930	978		−3.6%
1940	1,271		30.0%
1950	1,424		12.0%
1960	1,704		19.7%
1970	1,684		−1.2%
1980	1,599		−5.0%
1990	1,517		−5.1%
2000	1,575		3.8%
2010	1,527		−3.0%
2020	1,434		−6.1%
2022 (est.)	1,399		−2.4%
U.S. Decennial Census; 2020 Census

=== 2010 census ===
As of the census of 2010, there were 1,571 people, 670 households, and 367 families living in the city. The population density was 903.6 inhabitants per square mile (348.9/km^{2}). There were 750 housing units at an average density of 443.8 per square mile (171.4/km^{2}). The racial makeup of the city was 94.0% White, 2.9% Native American, 0.4% Asian, and 2.8% from two or more races. Hispanic or Latino of any race were 2.2% of the population.

There were 670 households, of which 27.0% had children under the age of 18 living with them, 37.5% were married couples living together, 11.9% had a female householder with no husband present, 5.4% had a male householder with no wife present, and 45.2% were non-families. 41.0% of all households were made up of individuals, and 22.3% had someone living alone who was 65 years of age or older. The average household size was 2.14 and the average family size was 2.89.

The median age in the city was 43 years. 25.5% of residents were under the age of 18; 6.3% were between the ages of 18 and 24; 20.2% were from 25 to 44; 21.9% were from 45 to 64; and 26% were 65 years of age or older. The gender makeup of the city was 46.9% male and 53.1% female.

=== 2000 census ===
As of the census of 2000, there were 1,575 people, 681 households, and 379 families living in the city. The population density was 969.1 inhabitants per square mile (374.2/km^{2}). There were 739 housing units at an average density of 454.7 per square mile (175.6/km^{2}). The racial makeup of the city was 96.70% White, 0.19% African American, 1.52% Native American, 0.51% Asian, 0.06% Pacific Islander, 0.06% from other races, and 0.95% from two or more races. Hispanic or Latino of any race were 0.57% of the population.

There were 681 households, out of which 26.0% had children under the age of 18 living with them, 42.4% were married couples living together, 10.0% had a female householder with no husband present, and 44.2% were non-families. 40.2% of all households were made up of individuals, and 25.3% had someone living alone who was 65 years of age or older. The average household size was 2.16 and the average family size was 2.92.

In the city, the population was spread out, with 23.1% under the age of 18, 6.5% from 18 to 24, 22.2% from 25 to 44, 19.6% from 45 to 64, and 28.7% who were 65 years of age or older. The median age was 44 years. For every 100 females, there were 83.4 males. For every 100 females age 18 and over, there were 78.4 males.

The median income for a household in the city was $27,634, and the median income for a family was $40,521. Males had a median income of $29,688 versus $21,176 for females. The per capita income for the city was $17,064. About 11.4% of families and 14.9% of the population were below the poverty line, including 15.6% of those under age 18 and 21.1% of those age 65 or over.

== History ==
In 1876, the first white settlers came to the Fosston area, arriving in covered wagons, bringing with them a few cattle, oxen, horses and mules. Charles Adair was the first to file a claim on the land, with nine others soon following. Fosston is in sections 3 and 4 of Rosebud Township, and was named after Louis Foss, an immigrant from the Nyttingnes, a village in Sogn og Fjordane county, Norway. The townsite was organized by W. J. Hilligoss, who selected and purchased it in 1884, had it surveyed, platted a four-block area, and built a hotel. Hilligoss died in 1941. The town was named Fosston when Foss moved his store and opened a post office there. The village was incorporated on August 22, 1895. The incorporation papers of Fosston were recorded on June 8, 1889, by the Register of Deeds in Crookston. Fosston was a busy depot on the Great Northern Railway line.

=== Cordwood Pete ===
Typical lumberjack in the days of Cordwood Pete

Arvid Clementson, Fosston's mayor until his death in 2006, created the legend of "Cordwood Pete" in an effort to promote tourism in Fosston. In what he called a "true story, embellished", Clementson said the complete story of Cordwood Pete was discovered in 2001, when a time capsule was discovered during the demolition of one of Fosston's oldest buildings.

Cordwood Pete was said to be the younger brother of famed lumberjack Paul Bunyan. While Paul was a giant, Pete was only 4 feet 9 inches tall. Pete's growth was stunted because he could never get enough flapjacks at the breakfast table with Paul eating everything in sight.

According to legend, Paul Bunyan left his home in Bangor, Maine, to make his way in the world, and ended up in the Minnesota north woods, where he excelled as a lumberjack. Tired of being mocked by lumberjacks in Maine for his size, Pete followed Paul to Minnesota, and despite his diminutive stature, found work as a lumberjack near Fosston, taking the name Peter Delang.

Local lumberjacks nicknamed him "Cordwood Pete" because his size suggested he was more suited to cutting cordwood than felling trees. Pete spent much time in the local saloons, and his fellow lumberjacks soon learned he was hot-tempered and spunky, especially after imbibing. They came to admire his feisty spirit, and no one dared fight him.

One day, Pete "borrowed" Paul's double-bladed ax. When he swung it, the weight of the huge ax kept it spinning as if in perpetual motion. When it finally stopped, 100 acres of timber had been felled. The railroad hired Pete the next day to clear a path for its tracks, and before the day was over, he had clear-cut 50 square miles of timber. Pete had to give Paul's ax back to him the next day, and never again achieved such a lumberjacking feat.

After that, Pete stuck to cutting cordwood, which he hauled to market with the help of his donkey, Tamarack. He died at the age of 84.

Authors Richard Dorson and Marshall Fitwick cite Paul Bunyan as an example of "fakelore"—a modern story passed off as an old folktale. Cordwood Pete may also qualify as fakelore.

=== High school sports ===
Fosston's boys basketball team won the first-ever state basketball championship in 1913. In 2002, the girls basketball team set the state consecutive win record, winning 78 games between 1999 and 2002.

== Media ==
=== Radio ===
- KKCQ (AM) 1480 "The Information Station" – Talk licensed to Fosston
- KKCQ-FM 96.7 "Q-Country 96.7" – Country

(studios in Fosston, licensed to nearby Bagley, MN. Owned by R & J Broadcasting.

- KKEQ FM 107.1 "QFM" – contemporary Christian music.

(Owned by Pine to Prairie Broadcasting. QFM's city of license is Fosston, but studios are split between Grand Forks, North Dakota, and Bemidji, Minnesota)

Other radio and television stations from Bemidji, Thief River Falls, Crookston, Grand Forks, North Dakota, and Fargo, North Dakota, can also be received.

=== Print ===
There is one local newspaper, The 13 Towns. The Grand Forks Herald (Grand Forks), The Forum (Fargo), The Pioneer (Bemidji), and Star Tribune (Minneapolis) are available by subscription or at newsboxes.

== Notable people ==
- Lily Hanson, writer and comedian
- Edgar Olson, politician and farmer
- Francis Stadsvold, basketball player and coach
- Reuben Harold Tweten, politician and farmer
