= Robert A. Brooks =

American telecommunications entrepreneur

Robert Alan Brooks
- Born: May 10, 1932; Boston
- Died: August 1, 2000 (aged 68); St. Louis
- Education: Northeastern University
- Occupation: Telecommunications entrepreneur
- Organization(s): Cencom Cable Associates, Brooks Telecommunications, several others
- Spouse: JoAnne
- Children: Robert, Marguerite, Patricia, Deborah, Maureen, Mary Katherine, Michael, and John

Robert Alan "Bob" Brooks (May 10, 1932 – August 1, 2000) was an American telecommunications entrepreneur in St. Louis, Missouri who founded several companies and was listed by Red Herring magazine as one of the Top Ten Entrepreneurs of 1999. His two best-known companies were Cencom Cable Associates and Brooks Fiber Properties. Cencom was sold to Hallmark Cards for $1 billion, and Brooks Fiber Properties was sold to WorldCom for $3 billion. His companies were responsible for building hundreds of thousands of miles of fiber-optic and cable television wiring across the United States.

== Career ==
A native of the Boston area, Brooks attended Boston Latin High and then Boston English High, from which he graduated in 1949. He enrolled at Northeastern University but dropped out the following year to join the United States Navy, where he gained familiarity with radio and radar equipment while serving during the Korean War. Upon leaving the military he returned to Northeastern University, receiving a degree in electrical engineering in 1958.

While still in school, Brooks worked two part-time jobs, one as a local police officer, and one as an electrical engineer. With his knowledge of radar from the Navy, Brooks obtained a job in 1954 at Spencer-Kennedy Laboratories in Boston, focusing on the expansion of cable networks. Upon graduating from Northeastern, Brooks resigned as a police officer to pursue a full-time career at SKL. By 1964 he was promoted to Chief Systems Engineer, though he had become frustrated with Spencer-Kennedy's lack of technological innovation. Brooks believed that the future was in transistorized equipment, but SKL was still focused on vacuum tube technology. So in 1965 he left SKL to become Chief Engineer at the Anaconda Wire and Cable Company, based in Sycamore, Illinois. SKL's fortunes faltered, and by 1967 the company was in serious financial trouble, so out of loyalty, Brooks returned to the company as vice-president to try to help salvage things. His efforts were unsuccessful, the company was taken over by the bank, and Brooks resigned in 1969. In 1970 he began consulting for a St. Louis-based company that was doing work in Vermont, J.C. Barnard & Associates.

Brooks then formed his own consulting company, Telecom Engineering, in St. Louis, which began to form some side franchises to run various cable systems in cities around Missouri. By the late 1970s he was head of Telecom Cablevision, which owned and operated cable TV systems west of St. Louis, in the cities of St. Charles, St. Peters, and Columbia. The company also operated some cable systems in the St. Louis area through a partnership with Teleprompter Corporation. Telecom Cablevision was eventually acquired by Group W Cable in 1980.

Next, in 1981, with seed capital of $300,000, Robert Brooks founded Cencom Cable Associates, pioneering the deployment of fiber-optic technology for cable TV. Within the next ten years, Cencom became the 21st-largest cable company in the United States, and in 1991 was purchased by Hallmark Cards, Inc., through its subsidiary Crown Media Holdings. In 1993 some former managers of Cencom — Howard Wood, Jerald Kent, and Barry Babcock — purchased the company back from Hallmark and formed Charter Communications, which in 1998 was sold to Microsoft co-founder Paul Allen for $4.5 billion.

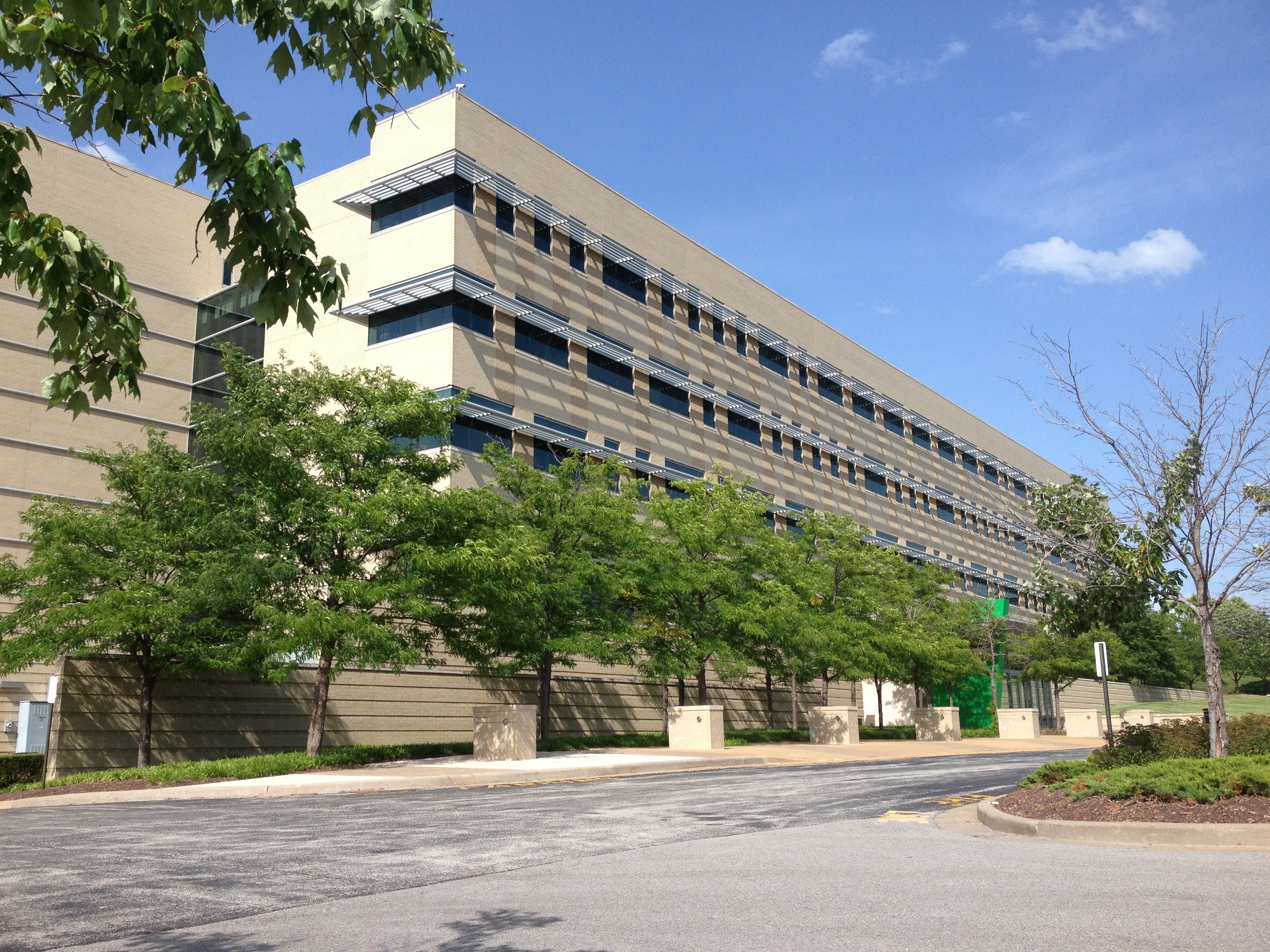
The southern facade of the Brooks Fiber Properties Headquarters spelled out the company's name in Morse code. BFP was later sold, and the current (2014) occupant of the building is CenturyLink.

Also in 1991, along with his son John, Robert founded Brooks Telecommunications Company, which then spawned multiple subsidiary companies including Brooks Fiber Properties, and Brooks Telecommunications International, which was tasked with building broadband networks in Guangzhou, China.

Brooks Fiber Properties was founded in 1993 as a data CLEC (competitive local exchange carrier) for $41 million. BFP's first year's revenue was $2,000, which grew to $2.8 million in 1994, and $14.2 million the following year. In January it purchased another network company, City Signal, bringing its annual revenue to $23 million. It went public two years later. In 1996, BFP built a new Headquarters building in Town and Country, Missouri. Designed by architect Seab Tuck, the building featured the company's name spelled out in Morse code in the southern facade of the windows.

Brooks Fiber was acquired by WorldCom in 1998 in a transaction that valued the equity at $2.6 billion. Robert Brooks and several members of the Brooks Fiber team then went on to found Gabriel Communications, raising $80 million in three days, and naming the company after Archangel Gabriel. In 2000, just prior to Robert's death, Gabriel acquired Trivergent Communications, and the company was renamed to NuVox. In 2004, NuVox merged with NewSouth Communications, and in 2009 it was acquired by Windstream for $643 million.

== Recognition ==
- 1986, chosen by The Cable Center for the list of Cable TV Pioneers
- 1999, selected by Red Herring magazine as one of the Top Ten Entrepreneurs of 1999
- March 2000, appeared on the cover of St. Louis Commerce magazine

== Personal life ==
Brooks was strongly Catholic, and raised millions of dollars for both the Archdiocese of St. Louis and for Vatican City projects to restore churches in Rome. In 1990, he worked with Archbishop John L. May (1922–1994) and Sister Mary Ann Eckhoff to co-found the Archdiocese's "Today and Tomorrow Educational Foundation". In 1996, he was ordained as a Deacon by Archbishop (later Cardinal) Justin Rigali, serving at Ascension Church in Chesterfield, Missouri and at St. Mary's Star of the Sea in Longboat Key, Florida. He met Pope John Paul II multiple times, and helped arrange a Papal visit to St. Louis in 1999.

He was married for 47 years to JoAnne Brooks, with whom he had five daughters and three sons. One son, Robert A. ("Bobby") Brooks Jr., died in an automobile accident in 1974. John Brooks co-founded Millennium Digital Media Systems and NuLink, and as of 2014 is CEO of NuTeq Solutions. Michael Brooks held several senior positions at Anheuser-Busch, and as of 2014 is CEO of Ardent Outdoors, Inc.

Robert Brooks died in 2000 at St. John's Hospital in St. Louis, from complications after surgery for cancer. His funeral mass was performed by Archbishop Rigali.
