= KYES (AM) =

- Rockville, Minnesota; United States
- Broadcast area: St. Cloud, Minnesota
- Frequency: 1180 kHz
- Branding: AM 1180 K-YES

Programming
- Format: Catholic talk
- Affiliations: Relevant Radio

Ownership
- Owner: Gabriel Media
- Sister stations: KKJM

History
- First air date: 2009

Technical information
- Licensing authority: FCC
- Facility ID: 136921
- Class: B
- Power: 50,000 watts (day); 8,000 watts (critical hours); 5,000 watts (night)
- Transmitter coordinates: 45°21′43″N 94°17′57″W
- Translators: K228FV (93.5 MHz, St. Joseph)

Links
- Public license information: Public file; LMS
- Website: kyesradio.com

KYES (1180 AM) is an American radio station licensed to serve the community of Rockville, Minnesota. The station is owned by Gabriel Media. The station's transmitter is located near Kimball, Minnesota, off MN 15. It can be heard throughout most of central Minnesota throughout the day with fringe coverage in the Twin Cities.

Station founder Andy Hilger began his radio career in 1958 as a disc jockey for WJON. Hilger later became owner and manager of WJON and three other stations in Central Minnesota. Hilger died in 2013.

Due to budgetary constraints, KYES shares radio studio space with KKJM ("Spirit 92.9") in Sauk Rapids, Minnesota—a radio station Hilger had donated to the Diocese of St. Cloud in 2000.

== Programming ==
KYES broadcasts a Roman Catholic talk radio format to the greater St. Cloud, Minnesota, area. Programming includes local news, weather and sports, plus Catholic-oriented talk shows from Relevant Radio.

== History ==
This station received its original construction permit from the Federal Communications Commission on January 25, 2006. In March 2006, permit holder D&E Communications applied to the FCC for permission to transfer the permit to Edward De La Hunt, Sr., of De La Hunt Broadcasting. The transfer was approved by the FCC on August 21, 2006, and the transaction was consummated the same day.

In January 2007, Edward De La Hunt, Sr., reached an agreement to transfer the permit to the Throw Fire Project, a Sauk Rapids-based nonprofit organization. The deal was approved by the FCC on March 13, 2007, and the transaction was consummated on May 31, 2007. The still-under construction station was assigned the KYES call sign by the FCC on June 14, 2007.

KYES applied for its license to cover from the FCC on May 27, 2009. The FCC formally accepted the application for filing on July 1, 2009. The station began operating under program test authority granted by the FCC on July 10, 2009. The "official" launch date for KYES was held August 1, 2009. KYES formally received its broadcast license from the FCC on March 11, 2010.

KYES was sold by the Throw Fire Project to Gabriel Media. The sale was consummated on September 13, 2012, for consideration of $500,000.
