= KKCQ (AM) =

- Fosston, Minnesota; United States
- Broadcast area: Fosston/Bagley; Eastern Polk County, Clearwater County
- Frequency: 1480 kHz
- Branding: Talk 'n' Oldies 1480/99.7

Programming
- Format: Full service talk/oldies
- Affiliations: ABC News Radio

Ownership
- Owner: Jimmy Birkemeyer; (R&J Broadcasting, Inc.)
- Sister stations: KKCQ-FM, KRJB, KRJM

History
- First air date: 1966
- Former call signs: KEHG (1966–1984)

Technical information
- Licensing authority: FCC
- Facility ID: 52635
- Class: D
- Power: 5,000 watts (day); 90 watts (night)
- Transmitter coordinates: 47°33′51.0″N 95°43′27.0″W
- Translator: 99.7 K259CW (Fosston))

Links
- Public license information: Public file; LMS

KKCQ (1480 AM) is a full service formatted broadcast radio station featuring a mix of talk and oldies music. KKCQ is licensed to Fosston, Minnesota, serving Eastern Polk County and Clearwater County. It is owned by Jimmy Birkemeyer, through licensee R&J Broadcasting, Inc.

== Programming ==
News comes from ABC News Radio and the Minnesota News Network.

== Location ==
It sits east of downtown Fosston at 30056 U.S. Highway 2, along with sister station KKCQ-FM. The transmitter site and towers are the studios.

== Call sign history ==
The station was assigned the KKCQ call letters by the Federal Communications Commission on November 16, 1984. It was originally KEHG, then owned by De La Hunt Broadcasting.
