= KAKK =

Currently silent
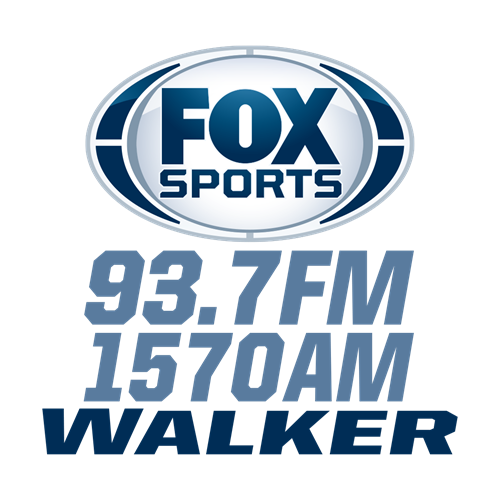
- Walker, Minnesota; United States
- Frequency: 1570 kHz
- Branding: Fox Sports 1570/93.7

Programming
- Format: Sports
- Affiliations: Fox Sports Radio

Ownership
- Owner: De La Hunt Broadcasting; (Da La Hunt Media, Inc.)
- Sister stations: KDKK, KKWB, KPRM, KQKK, KSKK, KXKK

History
- First air date: 1970 (as KLLR at 1600)
- Former call signs: KLLR (1970–1994); KLLZ (1994–2001)
- Former frequencies: 1600 kHz (1970–2002)
- Call sign meaning: KK Radio Network (owner)

Technical information
- Licensing authority: FCC
- Facility ID: 28655
- Class: B
- Power: 9,500 watts day 250 watts night
- Transmitter coordinates: 47°04′44″N 94°35′25″W
- Translator: 93.7 K229DJ (Walker)

Links
- Public license information: Public file; LMS
- Website: KAKK Online

KAKK (1570 AM, "Fox Sports 1570/93.7") is a radio station licensed to serve Walker, Minnesota, United States. The station is locally owned and operated by De La Hunt Media, Inc. (Formerly De La Hunt Broadcasting). The broadcast license is held by De La Hunt Media, Inc. The KAKK transmitter and tower are south of Walker, near the station's original home, when it was known as KLLR.

KAKK broadcasts a sports format, including programming from Fox Sports Radio. It also carries the simulcast of the "Coffee Talk" program, which originates at KPRM, and is currently simulcasted on KDKK.

The station was assigned the KAKK call sign by the Federal Communications Commission on January 3, 2002.

On May 11, 2022, KAKK changed its format from classic hits to sports, with programming from Fox Sports Radio.

On February 14, 2025, KAKK went silent.
