= Bagley, Minnesota =

City in Minnesota, United States

Bagley
- City
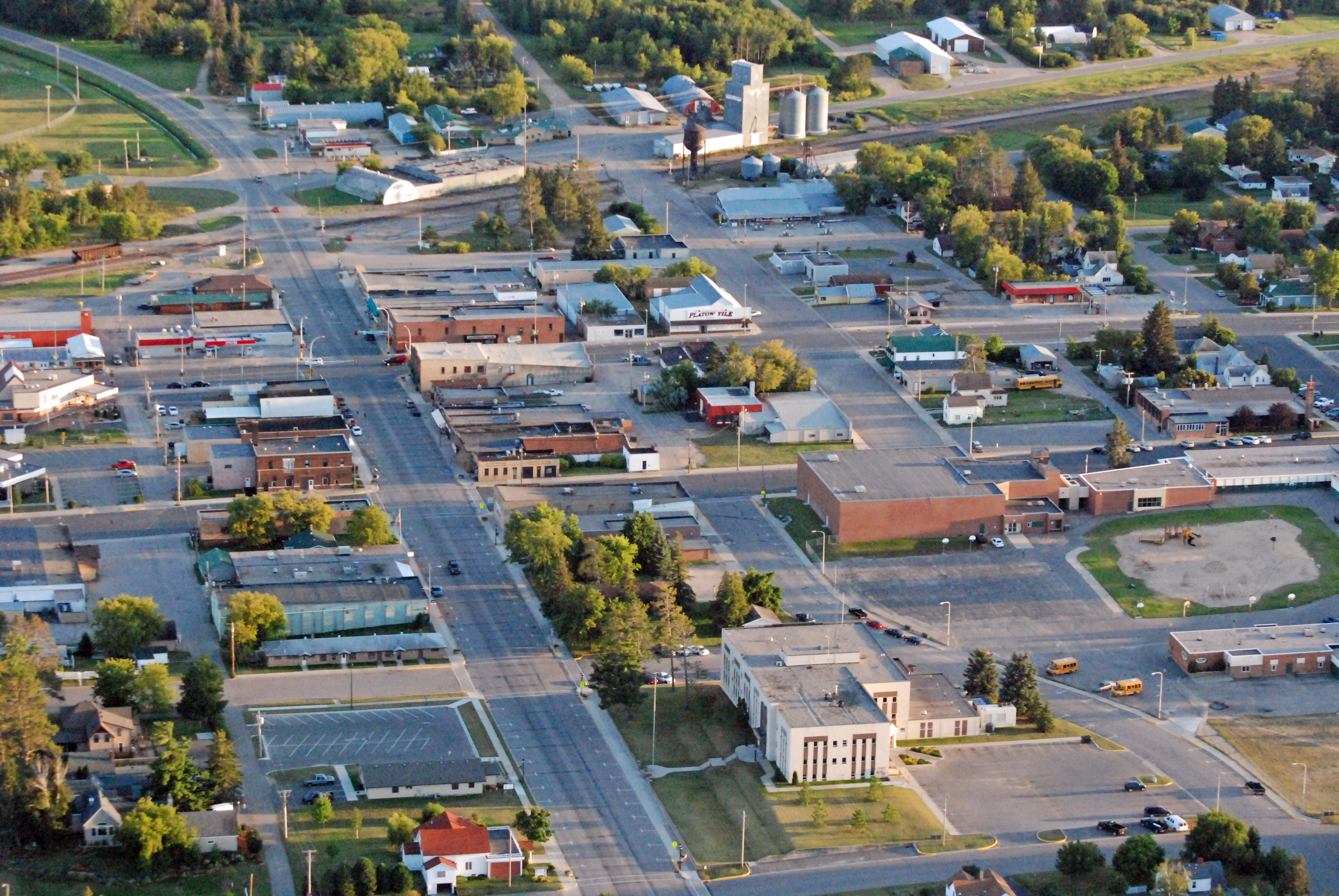
- Aerial photo of downtown Bagley, looking south

- Location of Bagley within Clearwater County and state of Minnesota
- Coordinates: 47°31′24″N 95°24′9″W
- Country: United States
- State: Minnesota
- County: Clearwater
- Founded: 1898

Government
  - Mayor: Sidney Michel

Area
  - Total: 2.21 sq mi (5.72 km^{2})
  - Land: 2.15 sq mi (5.56 km^{2})
  - Water: 0.062 sq mi (0.16 km^{2})
- Elevation: 1,450 ft (442 m)

Population (2020)
  - Total: 1,285
  - Estimate (2022): 1,307
  - Density: 598.4/sq mi (231.03/km^{2})
- Time zone: UTC-6 (Central)
  - Summer (DST): UTC-5 (CDT)
- ZIP code: 56621
- Area code: 218
- FIPS code: 27-03196
- GNIS feature ID: 0639566
- Website: bagleymn.us

Bagley (/ˈbeɪɡli/ BAYG-lee) is a city in Clearwater County, Minnesota, United States. The population was 1,285 at the 2020 census. It is the county seat of Clearwater County.

== History ==
A post office called Bagley has been in operation since 1898. The city was named for Sumner C. Bagley, a local lumberman.

== Geography ==
According to the United States Census Bureau, the city has a total area of 2.01 square miles (5.21 km^{2}), of which 1.95 square miles (5.05 km^{2}) is land and 0.06 square miles (0.16 km^{2}) is water.

Minnesota Highway 92 and four-lane U.S. Highway 2 are two of the main routes in the city.

== Demographics ==
Historical population
Census	Pop.	Note	%±
1900	248		—
1910	801		223.0%
1920	814		1.6%
1930	885		8.7%
1940	1,241		40.2%
1950	1,554		25.2%
1960	1,385		−10.9%
1970	1,314		−5.1%
1980	1,321		0.5%
1990	1,388		5.1%
2000	1,235		−11.0%
2010	1,392		12.7%
2020	1,285		−7.7%
2022 (est.)	1,307		1.7%
U.S. Decennial Census; 2020 Census

=== 2010 census ===
As of the census of 2010, there were 1,392 people, 619 households, and 319 families living in the city. The population density was 713.8 inhabitants per square mile (275.6/km^{2}). There were 735 housing units at an average density of 376.9 per square mile (145.5/km^{2}). The racial makeup of the city was 84.1% White, 0.6% African American, 11.2% Native American, 0.4% Asian, 0.1% from other races, and 3.7% from two or more races. Hispanic or Latino of any race were 2.4% of the population.

There were 619 households, of which 28.8% had children under the age of 18 living with them, 32.6% were married couples living together, 15.5% had a female householder with no husband present, 3.4% had a male householder with no wife present, and 48.5% were non-families. 43.5% of all households were made up of individuals, and 24.8% had someone living alone who was 65 years of age or older. The average household size was 2.12 and the average family size was 2.95.

The median age in the city was 40.3 years. 25.1% of residents were under the age of 18; 7.7% were between the ages of 18 and 24; 22.2% were from 25 to 44; 21.2% were from 45 to 64; and 23.8% were 65 years of age or older. The gender makeup of the city was 45.3% male and 54.7% female.

=== 2000 census ===
As of the census of 2000, there were 1,235 people, 993 households, and 795 families living in the city. The population density was 674.1 inhabitants per square mile (260.3/km^{2}). There were 603 housing units at an average density of 329.1 per square mile (127.1/km^{2}). The racial makeup of the city was 87.85% White, 0.73% African American, 8.99% Native American, 0.40% Asian, 0.08% from other races, and 1.94% from two or more races. Hispanic or Latino of any race were 0.65% of the population.

There were 993 households, out of which 24.1% had children under the age of 18 living with them, 39.1% were married couples living together, 10.3% had a female householder with no husband present, and 47.7% were non-families. 44.3% of all households were made up of individuals, and 28.0% had someone living alone who was 65 years of age or older. The average household size was 2.05 and the average family size was 2.84.

In the city, the population was spread out, with 20.6% under the age of 18, 9.9% from 18 to 24, 22.0% from 25 to 44, 19.1% from 45 to 64, and 28.4% who were 65 years of age or older. The median age was 43 years. For every 100 females, there were 83.5 males. For every 100 females age 18 and over, there were 83.0 males.

The median income for a household in the city was $23,125, and the median income for a family was $34,408. Males had a median income of $26,875 versus $25,000 for females. The per capita income for the city was $15,472. About 13.1% of families and 20.7% of the population were below the poverty line, including 30.0% of those under age 18 and 22.5% of those age 65 or over.

== Media ==
=== Newspapers ===
- The Farmer's Independent - local weekly newspaper

=== Radio ===
- KKCQ-FM 96.7 (licensed to Bagley, station studios in Fosston)

== Sports ==
On February 13, 1996, the Bagley varsity hockey team played their last game outdoors. They were the last Minnesota State High School League program to play outdoors. The A.F. Kaiser Arena was partially funded by a grant from the Mighty Ducks Community Ice Arena Grant Program.
