= KQKK =

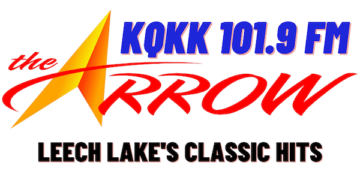
- Walker, Minnesota; United States
- Frequency: 101.9 MHz
- Branding: KQ102 The Arrow

Programming
- Format: Classic hits
- Affiliations: Westwood One

Ownership
- Owner: De La Hunt Broadcasting; (De La Hunt Media, Inc.)
- Sister stations: KAKK, KDKK, KPRM, KSKK, KXKK

History
- First air date: April 9, 1998
- Call sign meaning: KK Radio Network (owner)

Technical information
- Licensing authority: FCC
- Facility ID: 9032
- Class: C2
- ERP: 50,000 watts
- HAAT: 119 meters (390 ft)
- Transmitter coordinates: 47°3′14″N 94°15′32″W

Links
- Public license information: Public file; LMS
- Website: KQKK Online

KQKK (101.9 FM, "KQ102 The Arrow") is a classic hits radio station licensed to serve Walker, Minnesota, United States. The station is owned by De La Hunt Broadcasting and the broadcast license is held by De La Hunt Media, Inc. The station's transmitter and tower are east of town on Highway 200.

KQKK broadcasts a classic hits music format.

== History ==
This station received its original construction permit from the Federal Communications Commission on April 9, 1998. The new station was assigned the KQKK call sign by the FCC on May 9, 1998. KQKK received its license to cover from the FCC on December 14, 1999.

On May 11, 2022, KQKK changed formats from adult contemporary to classic hits, branded as "101.9 The Arrow".
