= KKCQ-FM =

- Bagley, Minnesota; United States
- Broadcast area: Fosston/Bagley; Eastern Polk County, Clearwater County
- Frequency: 96.7 MHz
- Branding: Q Country 96.7

Programming
- Format: Country
- Affiliations: ABC Radio, Minnesota News Network

Ownership
- Owner: Jimmy Birkemeyer; (R&J Broadcasting, Inc.)
- Sister stations: KKCQ (AM), KRJB, KRJM

Technical information
- Licensing authority: FCC
- Facility ID: 50324
- Class: C3
- ERP: 25,000 watts
- HAAT: 100 meters (330 feet)
- Transmitter coordinates: 47°36′12″N 95°32′40″W

Links
- Public license information: Public file; LMS
- Webcast: Listen
- Website: kkcqradio.com

KKCQ-FM (96.7 FM, "Q Country 96.7") is a radio station licensed to serve Bagley, Minnesota. It airs a stereo country music format. News comes from ABC News Radio and the Minnesota News Network.

It sits east of downtown Fosston at 30056 U.S. Highway 2, along with sister station KKCQ (1480 AM). Both stations are owned by Jimmy Birkemeyer, through licensee R&J Broadcasting, Inc. The transmitter and tower are northwest of Bagley.

The station was assigned the KKCQ-FM call letters by the Federal Communications Commission on October 1, 1996.
