= KPRM =

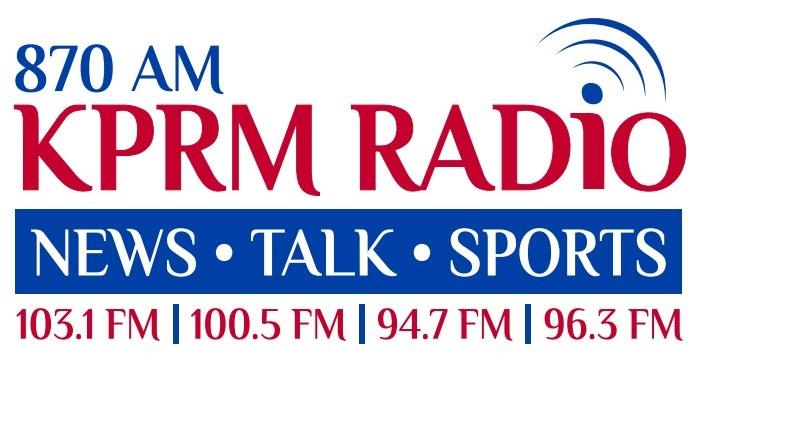
- Park Rapids, Minnesota; United States
- Frequency: 870 kHz
- Branding: 870 KPRM

Programming
- Format: News/Talk, Adult Contemporary
- Affiliations: FOX News Radio; Premiere Networks; Westwood One; Minnesota Twins

Ownership
- Owner: De La Hunt Media Inc.; (De La Hunt Media, Inc.)
- Sister stations: KAKK, KDKK, KKWB, KQKK, KXKK

History
- First air date: November 30, 1962
- Call sign meaning: Park Rapids, Minnesota

Technical information
- Licensing authority: FCC
- Facility ID: 15975
- Class: B
- Power: 50,000 watts day 2,500 watts night
- Transmitter coordinates: 46°55′42″N 95°00′22″W (day); 46°54′18″N 95°01′04″W (night)
- Translators: 94.7 K234CQ (Staples); 96.3 K242AY (Walker); 100.5 K263BR (Park Rapids); 103.1 K276EP (Bemidji)

Links
- Public license information: Public file; LMS
- Website: kkradionetwork.com

KPRM (870 AM) is a radio station in Park Rapids, Minnesota. It has a hybrid adult contemporary/conservative talk radio format. Locally, it broadcasts the popular "Coffee Talk" morning show, and is currently simulcasted on KDKK.

National news comes from the Fox News, the News/Talk/Sports and More format is locally owned and operated. Sports from Westwood One and Premiere Networks' Clay Travis and Buck Sexton Show and The Sean Hannity Show.

On November 30, 2016, KPRM was granted an FCC construction permit to increase the night power to 2,500 watts. KPRM can also be heard on four cross-service FM translators: 100.5 MHz Park Rapids, 96.3 MHz Walker, 103.1 MHz Bemidji and 94.7 Staples/Wadena.

In October 2021, KPRM changed its music segments from classic country to adult contemporary. KPRM continues to carry News/Talk, Sports and More. The more being adult contemporary music.

== Ownership ==
KPRM transmits with 50,000 watts of power during the day, 1,000 watts at night, and is owned and operated by De La Hunt Broadcasting, through licensee De La Hunt Media, Inc. The studios and offices are on the east side of Park Rapids, near the intersection of Highways 34 and 4. Because WWL in New Orleans, Louisiana is the dominant Class A station on 870 AM, KPRM must reduce power during nighttime hours, preventing interference with the skywave signal of WWL.

In 2006, previous owners Ed and Carol De La Hunt were inducted into the Pavek Museum of Broadcasting Hall of Fame. Effective September 24, 2021, ownership of KPRM and its sister stations was transferred to Ed and Tamara De La Hunt.

== Sister stations ==
In addition to the Park Rapids properties (KPRM, KDKK 97.5, and KXKK 92.5), they also own KKWB 102.5 in Bemidji, Minnesota, KAKK 1570 and KQKK 101.9 in Walker, Minnesota.
