= KDKK =

Coordinates: 46.931°N 95.008°W

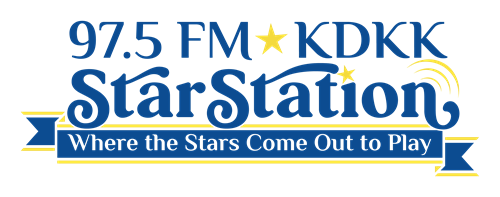
- Park Rapids, Minnesota; United States
- Frequency: 97.5 MHz
- Branding: Star Station

Programming
- Format: Adult standards
- Affiliations: Fox News Radio

Ownership
- Owner: De La Hunt Media, Inc.
- Sister stations: KAKK, KKWB, KPRM, KQKK, KXKK

History
- First air date: 1967
- Former call signs: KPRM-FM (1966-1989)
- Former frequencies: 97.5 MHz (1966-197?)
- Call sign meaning: KK Radio Network (owner)

Technical information
- Licensing authority: FCC
- Facility ID: 16433
- Class: C1
- ERP: 100,000 watts
- HAAT: 194 meters

Links
- Public license information: Public file; LMS
- Webcast: Listen Live
- Website: KDKK Online

KDKK (97.5 FM) is a radio station in Park Rapids, Minnesota. It broadcasts with 100,000 watts of effective radiated power. It is owned by De La Hunt Media, Inc., and has a locally produced adult standards/nostalgia music format. It also carries the simulcast of the "Coffee Talk" program, which originates at KPRM, and is also simulcasted on KDKK.

Hourly news updates are provided by FOX NEWS. Originally, it had CBS, NBC Radio news and USA News.

In 2006, previous owners Ed and Carol De La Hunt were inducted into the Pavek Museum of Broadcasting Hall of Fame. Effective September 24, 2021, KDKK and its sister stations ownership were transferred to their son Ed "Butch" and his wife Tamara De La Hunt; De La Hunt Media, Inc.

Their Park Rapids properties include KDKK, KPRM 870 and KXKK 92.5. They also own KKWB-FM in Bemidji, KAKK and KQKK in Walker, and FM translators in Walker 93.7 and 96.3, Park Rapids 100.5, Bemidji 103.1 and Staples/Wadena 94.7.

KDKK-FM operates Mondays to Saturdays from 5:30 am to midnight local time and Sundays from 7:00 am to midnight local time.

== History ==
KDKK traces its origins to KPRM-FM, the FM sister station of KPRM in Park Rapids. Ed and Carol De La Hunt established the Park Rapids radio operation in 1962, with KPRM-AM signing on December 2 of that year.

The FM station originally operated as KPRM-FM on 103.7 MHz. A 1997 local history article in the Northern Herald reported that KPRM-FM signed on in 1966 at 103.7 MHz with 100,000 watts, while a later NorthPine history item described the FM station as signing on in 1967. The first edition of the FM Atlas listed KPRM-FM at 103.7 MHz in Park Rapids in 1971.

KPRM-FM later moved from 103.7 to 97.5 MHz. In March 1975, Broadcasting reported that KPRM-FM had applied to change frequency to 97.5 MHz, change its antenna and transmitter system, change transmitter power output, use a height above average terrain of 413 feet, and add circular polarization. Subsequent Broadcasting notices in 1977 and 1978 listed construction-permit extension activity for KPRM-FM. A radio-aircheck history site states that KPRM-FM moved from 103.7 MHz to 97.5 MHz in the late 1970s.

The station adopted the KDKK call sign in 1989. The M Street Journal listed KPRM-FM 97.5 Park Rapids becoming KDKK in its August 14, 1989 call-letter changes, and Broadcasting listed the same change the following week.

After the call-letter change, KDKK retained some connection to KPRM programming. FMedia! listed KDKK in 1989 as the former KPRM-FM and described it as still partly an AM-FM simulcast with talk programming at night. In 1990, FMedia! described the station as "Starstation 97½" and noted that it had removed the evening talk programming. By December 1998, The M Street Journal listed KDKK as an adult standards station using Jones standards programming.

The station has remained part of the De La Hunt family's Park Rapids radio group. A 1997 Northern Herald article described KPRM-KDKK as providing local news, weather, sports and music, including an on-site color Doppler radar and the long-running "Coffeetime" program. In 2006, Ed and Carol De La Hunt were inducted into the Minnesota Broadcasting Hall of Fame.

KDKK also received later facility modifications. In January 1992, Broadcasting reported that De La Hunt Broadcasting Corporation had been granted a construction permit for KDKK to change its antenna height to 168 meters. In November 2000, The M Street Journal reported that KDKK had been granted an increase to 636 feet and a transmitter-location change.

In 2021, ownership of KDKK and its sister stations was transferred within the De La Hunt family. NorthPine reported that De La Hunt Media, owned by Ed "Butch" De La Hunt and Tamara De La Hunt, would acquire the KK Radio Network stations from Ed and Carol De La Hunt in a $1.15 million transaction that included KDKK. The KK Radio Network site states that Butch and Tammy De La Hunt purchased the station group in September 2021.

KDKK is branded as "KDKK 97.5 FM Starstation" and carries an adult standards format. The station's own website lists programming including the 50's-60's Show, Coffeetime, Mornings with Erin and America in the Morning, along with local, regional and world news, weather, high school sports and Minnesota Twins baseball.
