= KSKK =

- Verndale, Minnesota; United States
- Broadcast area: Staples-Wadena
- Frequency: 1070 kHz
- Branding: Relevant Radio

Programming
- Format: Catholic/Christian talk
- Affiliations: Relevant Radio

Ownership
- Owner: Gabriel Media
- Sister stations: KKJM, KYES

History
- First air date: 2005 (as KVKK)
- Former call signs: KVKK (2002–2015)
- Call sign meaning: KK Radio Network (former owners)

Technical information
- Licensing authority: FCC
- Facility ID: 129640
- Class: B
- Power: 5,000 watts
- Transmitter coordinates: 46°23′43″N 94°57′54″W (day); 46°23′45″N 94°57′52″W (night)
- Translators: 94.7 K234CQ (Staples); 101.3 K267CU (Verndale)

Links
- Public license information: Public file; LMS
- Webcast: Listen Live
- Website: relevantradio.com

KSKK (1070 AM) is an American radio station licensed to serve the community of Verndale, Minnesota. The station is owned by Gabriel Media and airs Religious programming from Relevant Radio.

== Programming ==
Between 2009 and June 2015, the station has aired a talk radio format branded as "The Talk of the Town". KVKK broadcast various syndicated talk radio programs from different sources. As of December 2011, it is still a talk station, airing Jim Bohannon's America in the Morning plus conservative talk shows hosted by Sean Hannity and Rush Limbaugh.

== History ==
This station received its original construction permit from the Federal Communications Commission on August 8, 2002. The new station was assigned the KVKK call sign by the FCC on November 27, 2002.

In October 2005, permit holder D&E Communications applied to the FCC to transfer the construction permit to DJ Broadcasting Corp. The deal was approved by the FCC on November 1, 2005, and the transaction was consummated on November 4, 2005. KVKK received its license to cover from the FCC on December 5, 2005.

When first launched, KVKK broadcast a classic country music format, including syndicated programming from Dial Global.

On June 30, 2015, KVKK changed its call sign to KSKK and picked up the "Arrow" adult contemporary format from KSKK 94.7 FM Staples, MN, which moved to the Detroit Lakes area as 94.5 FM KDLB.

In 2021, the KK Radio Network announced the sale of KSKK to Gabriel Media. Gabriel owns KKJM in St. Cloud, which airs a Christian Contemporary format, and KYES in Rockville which airs Catholic/Christian programming Relevant Radio.

In September 2021, KSKK flipped from adult contemporary to Catholic/Christian programming from Relevant Radio following the sale to Gabriel Media's, which closed on Sept. 27,2021.

1070 AM was previously occupied by KMOM, an American radio station licensed to Monticello, Minnesota, USA during the 1980s and early 1990s.
