= KXKK =

- Park Rapids, Minnesota; United States
- Frequency: 92.5 MHz
- Branding: Hot Country 92.5

Programming
- Format: Country
- Affiliations: Dial Global

Ownership
- Owner: De La Hunt Broadcasting; (De La Hunt Media, Inc.)
- Sister stations: KDKK, KPRM

History
- Call sign meaning: KK Radio Network (owner)

Technical information
- Licensing authority: FCC
- Facility ID: 4830
- Class: C2
- ERP: 10,000 watts
- HAAT: 178 meters (584 feet)
- Transmitter coordinates: 46°55′51″N 95°00′27″W

Links
- Public license information: Public file; LMS
- Website: kkradionetwork.com

KXKK (92.5 FM) is a radio station licensed to serve Park Rapids, Minnesota. Its hot country music format comes from the Westwood One networks. The station is owned by De La Hunt Media, Inc.

The station was assigned the KXKK call sign by the Federal Communications Commission on May 11, 1998.
