= Mass media in the Fargo–Moorhead metropolitan area =

The following is a list of media in Fargo, North Dakota and Moorhead, Minnesota, often called Fargo–Moorhead.

== Print ==
=== Newspapers ===
Newspaper	Note
The Concordian	Concordia College's student-run newspaper
The Extra	Local news; official legal newspaper: city of Moorhead, state of Minnesota
inForum	Local and national news; previously The Forum of Fargo-Moorhead, The Forum
High Plains Reader	Alternatively news, art, and entertainment weekly
The Advocate	Minnesota State University Moorhead student newspaper
The Spectrum	North Dakota State University student newspaper

=== Directories ===
Directory Name	Owner	Headquarters
SMARTSEARCH	SmartSearch, LLC	Fargo, ND
DEX Media	RH Donnelly	Cary, North Carolina
YellowBook USA	Yell Group	United Kingdom
702 Communications	SmartSearch, LLC	Perham, MN
PDC Pages	ZipLocal	Orem, UT

=== Magazines ===
- The Area Woman
- Bison Illustrated
- Inspired Home Magazine
- NDSU Magazine

== Television ==
Channel	Callsign	Affiliation	Branding	Subchannels		Owner
(Virtual)	Callsign	Affiliation	Branding	Channel	Programming	Owner
4.1	KRDK	Cozi TV/MyNetworkTV	KRDK 4	4.2; 4.3; 4.4; 4.5; 4.6; 4.7; 4.8	BEK Sports; Grit; Escape; Bounce TV; Laff; Comet; Buzzr	Major Market Broadcasting
6.1	WDAY	ABC	WDAY 6	6.2; 6.3; 6.4	Justice Network; WDAY'Z Xtra; ION	Forum Communications
11.1	KVLY	NBC	KVLY-TV 11	11.2; 11.3; 11.4	CBS (KXJB); MeTV; Circle	Gray Television
13.1	KFME	PBS	Prairie Public Television	13.2; 13.3; 13.4	World/Lifelong Learning; Minnesota Channel; PBS Kids	Prairie Public Television
15.1	KVRR	FOX	KVRR	15.2	Antenna TV	Red River Broadcasting
30.1	KXJB	CBS	KX4	30.2; 30.3	CW+ Heroes & Icons	Gray Television

== Radio ==
=== FM ===
Frequency	Call sign	Name	Format	Owner
88.7 FM	KFBN	Heaven 88.7	Christian	Fargo Baptist Church
89.1 FM	KNNZ	89.1 Ken's FM	Modern Rock, Local music	Pioneer Public Broadcasting
90.3 FM	KCCD	Minnesota Public Radio/NPR	News/Talk	Minnesota Public Radio
91.1 FM	KCCM	Minnesota Public Radio/NPR	Classical	Minnesota Public Radio
91.9 FM	KDSU	Prairie Public/NPR	Adult album alternative	North Dakota State University
92.3 FM	WZFG	AM 1100 The Flag & 92.3 FM	Talk	Flag Family
92.7 FM	K224FD	Bison 1660	Sports	Radio FM Media
93.1 FM	WDAY	970 WDAY AM & 93.1 FM	News/Talk	Flag Family
93.7 FM	KOYY	Y94	Top 40 (CHR)	Midwest Communications
94.5 FM	K233CY	94.5 The City	Adult Album Alternative (translator of KBVB-HD2)	Radio FM Media
95.1 FM	KBVB	Bob 95 FM	Country	Radio FM Media
95.9 FM	KRFF-LP	Radio Free Fargo	Freeform	Radio Free Fargo
96.3 FM	KNDS-LP	ThunderRadio	College	North Dakota State University
96.9 FM	K245BY	Hits 96.9	Rhythmic CHR (translator of KLTA-HD2)	Radio FM Media
97.9 FM	KFNW-FM	Life 97.9	Contemporary Christian Music	University of Northwestern - St. Paul
98.7 FM	KLTA	Big 98.7	Hot Adult Contemporary	Radio FM Media
99.3 FM	K257EP	K-Love	Contemporary Christian Music (KLDQ translator)	Educational Media Foundation
99.9 FM	KVOX-FM	Froggy 99.9	Country	Midwest Communications
100.7 FM	KLDQ	K-Love	Contemporary Christian Music	Educational Media Foundation
101.9 FM	KRWK	101.9 Jack FM	Adult Hits	Midwest Communications
102.5 FM	K273DJ	Faith 1200	Christian talk and teaching (KFNW-AM translator)	University of Northwestern - St. Paul
103.3 FM	KZCR	Z 103.3	Rock/AAA	Jerry Papenfuss
103.9 FM	KZTK	103.9 The Truck	Country	Vision Media Incorporated
104.1 FM	KBOT	104.1 The Wave	Adult Contemporary	Leighton Broadcasting
104.7 FM	KFGO-FM	The Mighty 790 & 104.7 KFGO	News Talk	Midwest Communications
105.1 FM	KQWB-FM	Q 105.1	Active Rock	Radio FM Media
106.1 FM	KQLX-FM	Thunder 106.1	Classic Country	Great Plains Integrated Marketing
106.5 FM	KRJB	KRJB 106.5	Country	R&J Broadcasting
106.9 FM	KEGK	Eagle 106.9	Classic Hits	Great Plains Integrated Marketing
107.9 FM	KPFX	107.9 The Fox	Classic Rock	Radio FM Media

=== AM ===
Frequency	Call sign	Name	Format	Owner
740 AM	KNFL	740 The Fan (ESPN Radio)	Sports	Radio Fargo-Moorhead
790 AM	KFGO	The Mighty 790 KFGO	News/Talk	Radio Fargo-Moorhead
890 AM	KQLX	Ag News 890	News/Classic Country	Great Plains Integrated Marketing
970 AM	WDAY	970 WDAY AM & 93.1 FM	News/Talk	Flag Family
1100 AM	WZFG	AM 1100 The Flag & 92.3 FM	Talk	Flag Family
1200 AM	KFNW	Faith 1200	Christian talk and teaching	University of Northwestern - St. Paul
1280 AM	KVXR	Real Presence Radio	Catholic	Real Presence Radio
1660 AM	KQWB	Bison 1660	Sports	Radio FM Media
