= KDLB =

Coordinates: 46.552°N 94.651°W

Satellite of KBVB, Barnesville/Fargo-Moorhead
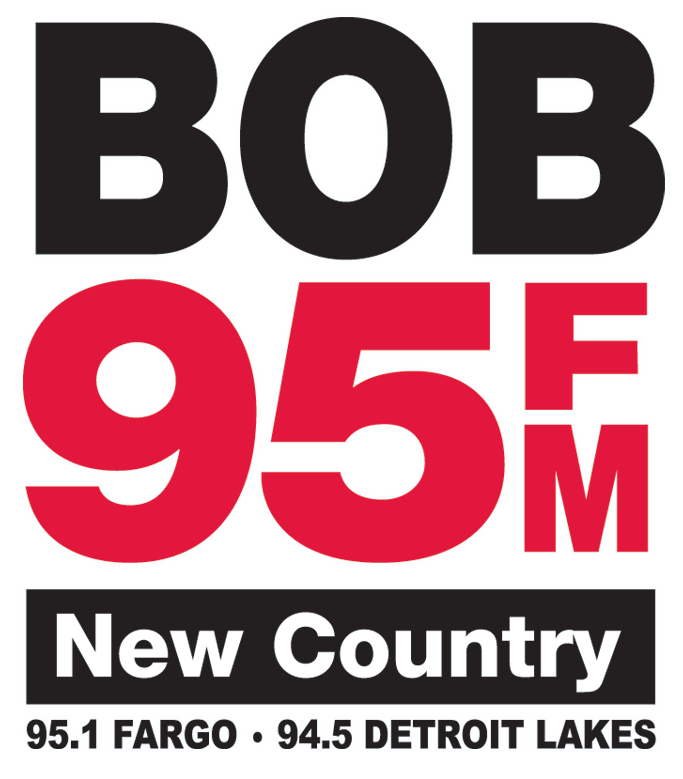
- Frazee, Minnesota; United States
- Broadcast area: Detroit Lakes, Minnesota
- Frequency: 94.5 MHz (HD Radio)
- Branding: Bob 95 FM

Programming
- Format: FM/HD1: Country (simulcast of KBVB); HD2: Top 40 (CHR) (simulcast of KLTA-FM); HD3: Classic rock (simulcast of KPFX)

Ownership
- Owner: James and Brooke Ingstad; (Radio Fargo-Moorhead, Inc.)
- Sister stations: KBVB, K233CY, KPFX, KLTA-FM, KQWB, KQWB-FM, KBMW, W245CM

History
- First air date: 1986 (as KSKK at 94.7)
- Former call signs: Staples: KSKK (1993–2015)
- Former frequencies: Staples: 94.7 MHz (1995–2015)
- Call sign meaning: K Detroit Lakes Bob

Technical information
- Licensing authority: FCC
- Facility ID: 49094
- Class: C3
- ERP: 11,000 watts
- HAAT: 150 meters

Links
- Public license information: Public file; LMS
- Webcast: Listen Live!
- Website: bob95fm.com

KDLB (94.5 FM, "Bob 95 FM") is a simulcast broadcasting a country music format as a simulcast of 95.1 KBVB in Fargo, North Dakota (licensed to Barnesville, Minnesota). KDLB is licensed to Frazee, Minnesota, United States, it serves the Detroit Lakes area. KDLB is owned by James and Brooke Ingstad.

== History ==
The station first signed on in 1993 as KSKK on 94.7, owned by the De La Hunt family. Branding itself as "The Arrow", it aired an Adult Contemporary format the entire time it was on 94.7.

In 2014, it was announced the De La Hunts had sold the station to Fargo radio owner Jim Ingstad, pending a Community of License change to Frazee, MN and change of frequency to 94.5. This would allow its tower facilities to reside in nearby Detroit Lakes, MN. On May 29, 2015, Radio FM Media announced that KSKK, once moved to Detroit Lakes, would rebroadcast 95.1 KBVB, filling the void in signal coverage created when that station moved its transmitter from the KVRR mast in Tansem to Moorhead in 2009.

On June 26, 2015 at noon, KSKK 94.7 signed off for good from Wadena, simultaneous with the sale to Ingstad closing at a purchase price of $900,000. Less than a week later on July 2, the station signed on from Detroit Lakes on 94.5 with new call letters KDLB, carrying KBVB programming from Fargo (along with sister stations KLTA-FM and KPFX on HD2 and HD3, respectively).
