= Bison Radio Network =

Collegiate sports radio network

- Type: Radio
- Country: United States
- Availability: North Dakota, Minnesota, Montana, Nebraska, Saskatchewan, Manitoba, South Dakota, World-Wide (online)
- Owner: Learfield

The Bison Radio Network is a series of 22 radio stations that broadcast North Dakota State Bison Athletics to the United States and Canada: North Dakota, Minnesota, Montana, Nebraska, South Dakota, Saskatchewan, and Manitoba over the air, and around the world via online streaming. The Bison Radio Network is produced by the flagships KQWB-AM "Bison 1660" and KPFX "107.9 The Fox" for Learfield.

== List of stations ==
- Fargo, ND KPFX 107.9 The Fox
- Fargo, ND KQWB Bison 1660
- Albany, MN KDDG 105.5
- Bismarck, ND KXMR 710 (day)
- Bismarck, ND KFYR 550 (night)
- Bowman, ND KPOK 1340
- Detroit Lakes, MN KDLB 94.5 FM
- Devils Lake, ND KDVL 102.5
- Dickinson, ND KLTC 1460
- Fergus Falls, MN KBRF 1250 AM
- Fosston, MN KKCQ-FM 96.7
- Glenwood, MN KMGK-FM 107.1
- Grafton, ND KAUJ-FM 101.9
- Grand Forks, ND KQYZ-FM 98.5
- Harvey, ND KHND 1470
- Jamestown, ND KSJB 600
- Minneapolis-St. Paul, MN KYCR (AM) 1440 AM
- Minot, ND KHRT 1320
- Oakes ND KDDR AM 1220
- Park Rapids MN KXKK FM 92.5
- Roseau, MN KCAJ-FM 102.1
- Rugby, ND KZZJ 1450
- Wahpeton, ND KBMW AM 1450
- Williston, ND KEYZ 660
