= KQW =

KQW may refer to:

- KCBS (AM), a radio station on 740 kHz licensed to San Francisco, California, United States, and originally licensed to San Jose, California, and which held the call sign KQW from 1921 to 1949.
- KQWB (AM), a radio station on 1660 kHz licensed to West Fargo, North Dakota, United States
- KQWB-FM, a radio station on 98.7 MHz licensed to Moorhead, Minnesota, United States
- KQWC-FM, a radio station on 95.7 MHz licensed to Webster City, Iowa
- KQWS, an FM radio station on 90.1 MHz licensed to Omak, Washington, United States
- KQWY, an FM radio station on 96.3 MHz licensed to Lusk, Wyoming, United States
- WLOQ, an FM radio station on 96.3 MHz licensed to Oil City, Pennsylvania, which held the call sign WKQW-FM from 1992 to 2022
