= KQWB =

KQWB may refer to:

- KQWB (AM), a radio station (1660 AM) licensed to West Fargo, North Dakota, United States
- KQWB-FM, a radio station (105.1 FM) licensed to Moorhead, Minnesota, United States
