= KLTA =

KLTA may refer to:

- Kanna Laddu Thinna Aasaiya, a 2013 Indian film
- KLTA-FM, a radio station
- KLTA-HD2, a radio station
