= KBMW =

KBMW may refer to:

- KBMW (AM), a radio station (1450 AM) licensed to serve Breckenridge, Minnesota, United States
- KBMW-FM, a radio station (92.7 FM) licensed to serve Breckenridge, Minnesota
