= KZDR =

KZDR may refer to:

- KBMW-FM, a radio station (92.7 FM) licensed to serve Breckenridge, Minnesota, United States, which held the call sign KZDR from 2013 to 2016
- KAZY, a radio station (93.7 FM) licensed to serve Cheyenne, Wyoming, United States, which held the call sign KZDR from 2006 to 2008
