= KLTA-FM =

Radio station in Moorhead, Minnesota

Coordinates: 46.546°N 96.628°W

- Moorhead, Minnesota; United States
- Broadcast area: Fargo-Moorhead
- Frequency: 98.7 MHz (HD Radio)
- Branding: Big 98.7

Programming
- Format: Adult Contemporary hits
- Subchannels: HD2: Rhythmic contemporary

Ownership
- Owner: Radio FM Media; (Radio Fargo-Moorhead, Inc.)
- Sister stations: K233CY, KBVB, KPFX, KQWB, KQWB-FM, KBMW, K245BY

History
- First air date: 1983
- Former call signs: KKIB (1983–1984)
- Former frequencies: 105.1 MHz (1983–2013)
- Call sign meaning: Former "Lite Rock" brand

Technical information
- Licensing authority: FCC
- Facility ID: 21191
- Class: C1
- ERP: 100,000 watts
- HAAT: 177 meters (581 ft)
- Translator: HD2: 96.9 K245BY (Moorhead)

Links
- Public license information: Public file; LMS
- Webcast: Listen live; Listen live (HD2)
- Website: big987.com; 969hitsfm.com (HD2)

KLTA-FM (98.7 FM, "Big 98.7") is a radio station based in Fargo, North Dakota, though licensed by the Federal Communications Commission (FCC) to Moorhead, Minnesota, owned by Jim Ingstad's Radio FM Media. The station carries an adult-oriented Top 40 (CHR) format. KLTA and rhythmic CHR-formatted HD2 translator K245BY ("96.9 Hits FM") compete against heritage Top 40 (CHR) KOYY.

Its studios are located on 7th Avenue South in Fargo, while its transmitter is located near Sabin, Minnesota.

== History ==
The station signed on as KKIB in 1983, and served as the flagship station of contemporary hit radio (Top 40) formatted Superstation Double K FM network, which was also broadcast on KKWS in Wadena, Minnesota and KKVC in Valley City, North Dakota.

=== Lite Rock 105 (1984–2004) ===
On October 7, 1984, KKIB flipped to an Adult Contemporary format, changed call letters to KLTA-FM, and rebranded as "Lite Rock 105", a name and format they would keep for 20 years. Dan Michaels and Jane Alexander began doing the morning show as the station began to rise in popularity. In 2001, the morning show transitioned to "Chris, John and Jane in the Morning" with the addition of Chris Hanson and John Austin. In 1989, KLTA-FM started the Christmas Wish Program. The station asks for donations throughout the year to their Christmas Wish Charity (mainly at their "Wishburger" event in June and the Wish-a-thon in December), and then gives out $500 gifts to families in need throughout the month of December.

=== FM 105.1 (2004–2013) ===
In the early 2000s, KLTA-FM's "Lite Rock" format was starting to turn into a Hot AC format. In January 2004, the station interspersed messages in between songs saying "January 19th, 7:20 a.m., Turn off the Lite". At that time, the station thanked Fargo-Moorhead for 20 years of listening, played a package of memories from the station from 1984 to then, and changed their name to "FM 105.1" to reflect this change. ("FM" had a dual meaning on this station, not only standing for Frequency Modulation, but also Fargo-Moorhead.) Since then, the station's focus was to be an at-work station, playing hits from the 90's and new music currently charting at the time.

=== Ownership changes ===
In May 1999, Triad Broadcasting reached a deal to acquire KLTA-FM, along with KQWB, KQWB-FM, KVOX, and KPFX, from brothers Jim and Tom Ingstad as part of a twelve-station deal valued at a reported $37.8 million.

On November 30, 2012, Triad Broadcasting signed a definitive agreement to sell all 32 of their stations to Larry Wilson's L&L Broadcasting for $21 million. Upon completion of the sale on May 1, 2013, L&L in turn sold the Fargo stations to Jim Ingstad, who had just sold his competing cluster to Midwest Communications. A local marketing agreement was placed so Ingstad could take immediate control of the stations, and the sale became final July 2, 2013. The sale was worth $9.5 million.

=== Launch of "Big 98.7" ===
On August 9, 2013, it was announced that on August 16, sister station KQWB-FM would move to 105.1 and re-brand as "Q105.1." The final song on "FM 105.1" was "Closing Time" by Semisonic. After the song ended, KLTA-FM went silent for about 15 seconds until KQWB-FM began a simulcast on both frequencies.

At 5:00 p.m. that evening, in the middle of "In the End" by Black Veil Brides, 98.7 FM broke from the simulcast with KQWB-FM. At that point, 98.7 began identifying as KLTA-FM, effectively completing a call sign swap with KQWB-FM.

The new KLTA-FM, meanwhile, began stunting using a "Wheel of Formats", which was spun at the top of every hour, landing on formats including "Weird Al Radio", "Polka Radio", "Santa 98.7" and "TV Themes", and encouraging listeners to tune at 5 p.m. on August 19 for "something big". At that time, the station debuted a hybrid Hot AC/Top 40 (CHR) format as "Big 98.7", directly competing against heritage Top 40/CHR KOYY-FM ("Y94"). The first song as "Big" was I Gotta Feeling by The Black Eyed Peas. The following morning, Jesse and Amanda with Pike in the Morning debuted on their new home, after leaving then-sister station KVOX-FM a few weeks earlier. That same day, Cori Jensen began doing the midday shift, making her the only personality to carry over from "FM 105.1".

== HD Radio ==
In March 2015, KLTA began broadcasting in HD, making them the second commercial station in the Fargo-Moorhead market utilizing HD Radio after sister station KBVB. A week later on March 15, 2015, KLTA launched a rhythmic CHR-formatted HD2 sub-channel, branded as "Hits 96.9" (a reference to translator K245BY (96.9 FM), operating from atop the Fargo High Rise Senior Center in downtown).

== Former KLTA DJs ==
- Alek OnThe-Radio (now at KAJA-FM)
- Amber Bach
- "Big Dog" Mike Kapel (now at WDAY-TV)
- "Broadway" Bill Lee (while "Superstation KK-FM"; now at WCBS-FM)
- Bo Janssen (now at KEGK)
- Chole D
- Chris Hanson (now at KBVB)
- Cori Jensen (now at KBVB)
- Gordo Hultengren (now at WNDV-FM)
- Harry Calahan
- James Rabe (now at KYBA)
- Jamie Kayne
- Jane Alexander
- Jax (now at KLEN)
- Jesse James (now at KBUL-FM)
- Jim Daniels
- John Austin (now at KBVB)
- Kyle Matthews
- Lil’ Raspy (now at KVLY-TV)
- Madi (Intern Daddy's Girl)
- Mia
- Mike Ray
- Tim Richards
- Tony Lorino
- Scotty Matthews
- Valerie Martin
- Amanda Lea
