= KPFX =

Coordinates: 46.546°N 96.628°W

- Kindred, North Dakota; United States
- Broadcast area: Fargo-Moorhead
- Frequency: 107.9 MHz (HD Radio)
- Branding: 107.9 The Fox

Programming
- Format: Classic rock
- Subchannels: HD2: KQWB-FM simulcast HD3: Sports Bison 1660
- Affiliations: United Stations Radio Networks

Ownership
- Owner: Radio FM Media; (Radio Fargo-Moorhead, Inc.)
- Sister stations: K233CY, K245BY, KBVB, KLTA-FM, KQWB, KQWB-FM

History
- First air date: 1989 (as KSMM)
- Former call signs: KSMM (1989–1993)
- Call sign meaning: K P FoX

Technical information
- Licensing authority: FCC
- Facility ID: 47310
- Class: C1
- ERP: 100,000 watts
- HAAT: 177 meters

Links
- Public license information: Public file; LMS
- Webcast: Listen Live
- Website: 1079thefox.com

KPFX (107.9 FM, "107.9 The Fox") is a classic rock radio station licensed to serve Kindred, North Dakota, serving the Fargo-Moorhead metropolitan area. The radio station is owned by Jim Ingstad's Radio FM Media, and is the flagship radio station for North Dakota State University Football and Men's Basketball.

Its studios are located on 7th Avenue South in Fargo, while its transmitter is located near Sabin, Minnesota.

== Ownership ==
In May 1999, Triad Broadcasting reached a deal to acquire this station (along with KQWB 1660 (Sports Talk), KQWB-FM 98.7 (Active rock), KVOX 99.9 (Country), and KLTA 105.1 (Hot AC)) from brothers Jim and Tom Ingstad as part of a twelve-station deal valued at a reported $37.8 million.

On November 30, 2012, Triad Broadcasting signed a Definitive Agreement to sell all 32 of their stations to Larry Wilson's L&L Broadcasting for $21 Million. Upon completion of the sale on May 1, 2013, L&L in turn sold the Fargo stations to Jim Ingstad, who had just sold his competing cluster to Midwest Communications. An LMA (Local Marketing Agreement) was placed so Ingstad could take immediate control of the stations, and the sale became final July 2, 2013. The sale was worth $9.5 million.

On August 4, 2014, KPFX moved its transmitter from its longtime home near Wolverton, MN to just south of Sabin, MN, giving the station an optimal signal in the Fargo-Moorhead metro area, and great coverage of the Detroit Lakes, MN area.

== 61 for 61 Radiothon ==
Since 1997, The Fox has partnered with Merticare's Roger Maris Cancer Center to hold a three-day radiothon event, usually towards the end of September. The on-air portion includes stories from survivors and the family members who lost the battle to Cancer. A memorial wall (originally a billboard in its early years) is put up where family members can put the names of loved ones who have had cancer. The event is held in honor of Roger Maris, a North Dakota native, Baseball legend and Cancer victim himself. The event also includes live performances from local bands, games for the kids and the 61 for 61 home run walk.

== Program schedule ==
- The Fox Morning Show with Dave and Moose (Mon-Fri 5:30a-9a)
- Rockin’ You On The Job (Mon-Fri 10a-1p)
- Jay Farley (Mon-Fri 2p-7p)
- The FOX Weeknights (Mon-Fri 7p-10p)

== Former Staff ==
- Robbie Daniels (now at KFGO-AM)
- Fish (now at KQWB-FM)
- Kevin Flynn
- Kydd Ballou
- Tim O'Connor
- Rick Rhodes
- Big Nate
- Michael Farley
- Jamie Kaye
- Fred Bevill
- Terry Bradshaw
- Tank McNamara (Now at KVOX-FM)
- Ally McKenzie
- Mike Waters
- Mike Ray
- Scotty Matthews
- Shelly Knight
- Jeff Stevens
- Scotch (Now at KVOX-FM)
- Dui
- Marshall Kennedy
- Novack
- Derek Hanson (Now at KFGO)
- Paulee
- Elwood Blues
- J. Pierce
- Jim Daniels
- Trav (Now at KRFF-LP)
- Knoxville Cooper
