= KRFF =

KRFF may refer to:

- KRFF (FM), a radio station (89.1 FM) licensed to serve Fairbanks, Alaska, United States
- KRFF-LP, a low-power radio station (95.9 FM) licensed to serve Moorhead, Minnesota, United States
