= KFNL =

KFNL may refer to:

- The ICAO code for Fort Collins-Loveland Municipal Airport in Loveland, Colorado, United States
- King Fahad National Library
- KFNL-FM, a radio station (104.3 FM) in Spring Valley, Minnesota, United States
- KBMW-FM, a radio station (92.7 FM) in Kindred, North Dakota, United States, which held the call sign KFNL from 2007 to 2013
