= KBVB =

Country music radio station in Barnesville, Minnesota, United States

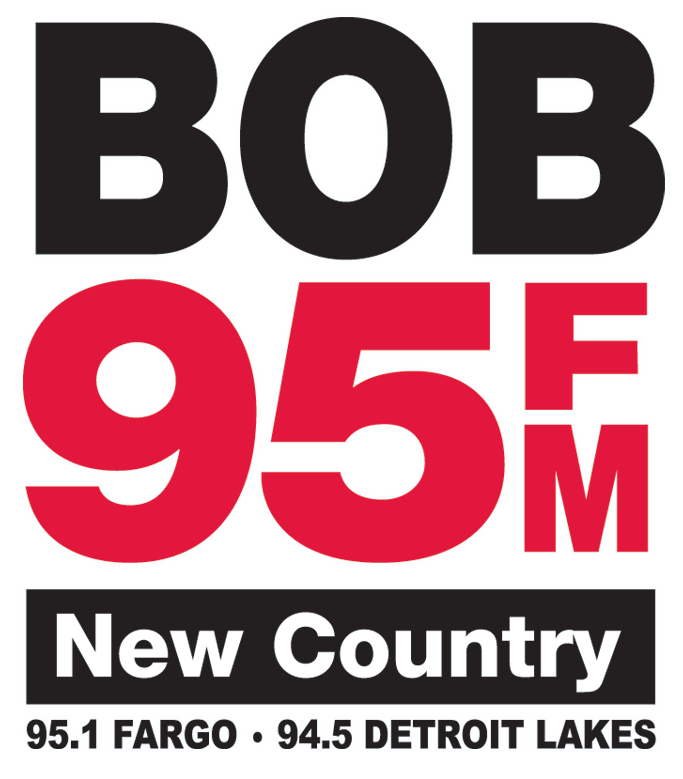
- Barnesville, Minnesota; United States
- Broadcast area: Fargo-Moorhead
- Frequency: 95.1 MHz (HD Radio)
- Branding: Bob 95 FM

Programming
- Format: FM/HD1: Country; HD2: AAA "The City at 94.5"

Ownership
- Owner: James and Brooke Ingstad; (Radio Fargo-Moorhead, Inc.)
- Sister stations: K233CY, KPFX, KLTA-FM, KQWB, KQWB-FM, KDLB, K245BY

History
- First air date: 1980 (as KDLM-FM)
- Former call signs: KVLR (1977–1980); KDLM-FM (1980–1996); KFGX (1996–2000); KRVI (2000–2007)
- Call sign meaning: Barnesville Bob

Technical information
- Licensing authority: FCC
- Facility ID: 37001
- Class: C1
- ERP: 100,000 watts
- HAAT: 117 meters
- Transmitter coordinates: 46.8191°N 96.7659°W
- Translators: 94.5 K233CY (Wahpeton, North Dakota, relays HD2)
- Repeater: 94.5 KDLB (Frazee)

Links
- Public license information: Public file; LMS
- Webcast: Listen Live (FM/HD1); Listen Live (HD2)
- Website: bob95fm.com (FM/HD1); The City 94.5 (HD2)

KBVB (95.1 FM, "Bob 95 FM") is a radio station broadcasting a country format. Licensed to Barnesville, Minnesota, it serves the Fargo-Moorhead metropolitan area. It first began broadcasting in 1980 under the call sign KDLM-FM on 95.3 Detroit Lakes, Minnesota. The station is currently owned by James and Brooke Ingstad, through licensee Radio Fargo-Moorhead, Inc. All the offices and studios are located at 2720 7th Ave. South in Fargo, while its transmitter is located on U.S. Route 75 just south of Moorhead.

== History ==
95.1 began its life around 1980 as KDLM-FM on the 95.3 frequency licensed to Detroit Lakes, Minnesota. The station was purchased from Leighton Broadcasting in 1995 by MidStates Broadcasting, a division of OtterTail Power Company. At that time the studio was moved in with new sister-stations KFGO/KFGO-FM and KVOX/KVOX-FM. KDLM moved to the 95.1 frequency and underwent a format flip to alternative rock as "95X" under the call letter KFGX. This format was relatively short lived as the station transitioned to Adult Contemporary in 1997, then mainstream rock as "Rock 95" in 1998. MidStates Broadcasting was later bought out by James Ingstad in 1999.

Clear Channel Communications bought Ingstad's Fargo stations in 2000, and debuted River 95.1 debuted with an adult contemporary format. KRVI tweaked to its current AAA format in 2003, similar to that of co-owned KTCZ "Cities 97" in Minneapolis, Minnesota. After success with the AAA format on Cities 97 in Minneapolis, Clear Channel recreated the format in Fargo and several other markets. These stations tend to draw in a large middle aged, well-educated audience which made them appealing to advertisers and profitable, despite the fact that they may not have had large overall audiences. River 95.1 also annually aired Christmas music after Thanksgiving until Christmas Day.

River 95 logo as used from 2000-2007.

On September 28, 2006, KRVI and the other Clear Channel stations in Fargo were sold back to James Ingstad, who lives in Fargo. (He previously did not own KDAM, as didn't sign on until 2002.) The sale was approved by the Federal Communications Commission (FCC) on January 19, 2007.

Starting at Midnight on March 8, 2007, KRVI began stunting by repeating Tie Me Kangaroo Down, Sport by Rolf Harris continuously. On March 12, 2007, the station became KBVB "Bob 95 FM".

Bob 95 FM became an instant favorite, partially due to their early TV commercials, that often parody a popular song, such as adding words to the Chicken Dance, and at Christmas, re-writing "Jingle Bells". Their commercials also often featured the "Bob Puppets" that include a cowboy and two bobbers. There was also a "Wheels On The Bus" parody commercial for BOB 95 that had several different versions that feature groups of people from the Fargo-Moorhead area singing the jingle, including the West Fargo Fire Department. In recent years, KBVB hasn't run any local TV spots. However, the cowboy puppet (that starred in most of the ads) still serves as the station's mascot at parades and events.

The Spring 2010 Arbitron ratings gave KBVB an 8.4 share, making them the 3rd place radio station in the market based on AQH share behind KFGO and KQWB-FM, who had a 12.1 and a 9.6 respectively. This marks the first time BOB95 surpassed competitor Froggy 99.9 who registered a 7.9 share. Arbitron Ratings. Since then, the ratings battle between the two stations has remained competitive- with the stations often trading the crown.

In 2012, it was announced that KBVB, along with Ingstad's other Fargo stations would be sold to Midwest Communications for $25 million in a deal that took effect on May 1. A day later, Ingstad purchased crosstown rival Go Radio Fargo, including stations KVOX-FM, KPFX, KLTA, KBMW, KQWB-FM and KQWB-AM for $9.5 million. The following day, Ingstad and Midwest Communications announced that they would be trading country stations KBVB and KVOX in an even trade. That trade took effect on August 5, 2013, sending KVOX to Midwest, and KBVB back into the hands of Jim Ingstad. Despite reports that listeners would not notice changes, KVOX's morning show "Jesse, Amanda and Pike" was cancelled, along with KBVB's Lucy Black and Collin Taylor (who stayed with Midwest and went to KRWK and KVOX, respectively). "Jesse, Amanda and Pike" reappeared a few weeks later at KBVB sister station KLTA.

Over the 4th of July weekend, 2015, KBVB and parent company Radio FM Media had finished their acquisition of KSKK-FM from De La Hunt Broadcasting. The KSKK signal was moved to Frazee, Minnesota, renamed KDLB, and began simulcasting KBVB. This replaced listenership lost when 95.1 moved their signal closer to the Fargo metro when they flipped to "BOB 95". The KDLB signal competes primarily with KRCQ-FM.

On November 4, 2015, it was announced that KBVB would become the official radio station of WE Fest, which is advertised to be the "largest country and camping festival in America". The three-year deal would begin with the 2016 festival. This ended a long run of the station being "banned" from the festival and the airstaff referring to it on air as "bleep fest". KBVB has retained a partnership with WE Fest each year up to the present day.

KBVB is the market affiliate for The American Country Countdown with Ryan Fox on Sunday mornings and, until its cancellation, The Country Fried Mix on Saturday nights produced by DJ Sinister of Big & Rich.

== HD radio ==
On October 15, 2014, KBVB began broadcasting in HD, making them the first commercial station in the Fargo-Moorhead market utilizing HD Radio technology. A week later on October 22, KBVB launched a Triple-A formatted HD2 sub-channel called "The Loft" with a translator on K233CY 94.5 operated from the STL relay tower outside the KBVB studio in Fargo. On October 30, the sub channel rebranded as "The City" due to a trademark claim from SiriusXM. The HD3 sub-channel simulcasted KQWB-AM, a classic country station known as "Willie @ 1660", which later became a Fox Sports Radio affiliate. The HD3 signal moved to sister station KPFX-HD3 in July 2016.

== Station Staff ==
- Chris, John, & Cori (Weekday Mornings 6 am-9 am)
- Chris Hanson (Sat 6 am-9 am)
- John Austin (Sun 12 pm-4 pm)
- Ian (Mon-Sat 9 am-2 pm)
- Farley (Mon-Sat 2 pm-7 pm)

== Former Station Staff ==
- Collin Taylor
- Steve Bakken
- Jane Alexander
- Laura Bradshaw (Now at KLZZ)
- Lucy Black
- Lance
- Curtis
- Blake
- Mandy (Now at KOYY and KVOX-FM)
- Alek
- Megan (Now at KEGK and KLTA-FM)
- Zero (Now at KOYY)
- Bo Janssen (Now at KEGK)
- Natalie Nash
