= KLDQ =

Radio station in Harwood, North Dakota

- Harwood, North Dakota; United States
- Broadcast area: Fargo–Moorhead
- Frequency: 100.7 MHz

Programming
- Format: Contemporary Christian music
- Affiliations: K-Love

Ownership
- Owner: Educational Media Foundation
- Sister stations: KFAA

History
- First air date: 2001
- Former call signs: KRKH (1998–2001); KGBZ (2001–2003); KDJZ (2003–2004); KKLQ (2004–2017)
- Call sign meaning: K-Love North DaQ(K)ota

Technical information
- Class: C2
- ERP: 40,000 watts
- HAAT: 100 meters
- Transmitter coordinates: 47.145°N 96.972°W

Links
- Webcast: Listen live
- Website: www.klove.com

KLDQ (100.7 FM) is a radio station in Fargo, North Dakota (licensed to Harwood, North Dakota), broadcasting the K-LOVE radio network, airing a contemporary Christian music format.

== History ==
The station signed on in 2001 as KGBZ with an 80's rock format known as "The Buzz", owned and operated by Tom Ingstad. The Buzz also aired Loveline and Bob and Tom.

KGBZ switched to a smooth jazz in 2003 as "FM Smooth Jazz", along with adopting the KDJZ call sign.

Educational Media Foundation purchased KDJZ in 2004, and became a full-time K-LOVE network affiliate, along with changing the call sign to KKLQ to reflect K-LOVE. In 2007, KKLQ resolved its limited signal issue in the eastern Fargo-Moorhead area by signing on a translator K257EP 99.3 FM in Dilworth, Minnesota. Translator K237ER 95.3 FM also signed on in Grand Forks, North Dakota weeks later.

On November 8, 2017, EMF filed to use the KKLQ call sign for their new K-LOVE affiliate at 100.3 in Los Angeles and slated KLDQ to be the new call sign for the 100.7 frequency. The change took effect on November 16, 2017.

== Translators ==
Broadcast translators for KLDQ
Call sign	Frequency	City of license	FID	ERP (W)	Class	FCC info
K237ER	(95.3 FM) FM	Grand Forks, North Dakota	147645	250	D	LMS
K257EP	(99.3 FM) FM	Dilworth, Minnesota	156499	250	D	LMS
