= KKLQ =

KKLQ may refer to:

- KKLQ (FM), a radio station (100.3 FM) licensed to serve Los Angeles, California, United States
- KLDQ, a radio station (100.7 FM) licensed to serve Harwood, North Dakota, United States, which held the call sign KKLQ from 2005 to 2017
- KLNV, a radio station (106.5 FM) licensed to serve San Diego, California, United States, which held the call sign KKLQ or KKLQ-FM from 1987 to 1998
