= KLTA-HD2 =

Coordinates: 46°45′35″N 96°36′28″W

K245BY
- Moorhead, Minnesota; United States
- Broadcast area: Fargo-Moorhead
- Frequency: 96.9 MHz (HD Radio via KLTA-FM-HD2)
- Branding: 96.9 Hits FM

Programming
- Format: Commercial; Rhythmic Top 40 (CHR)

Ownership
- Owner: James and Brooke Ingstad; (Brooke Ingstad)
- Sister stations: K233CY, KBVB, KPFX, KQWB, KQWB-FM, KLTA-FM, KBMW

History
- First air date: March 15, 2015
- Former call signs: W245CM
- Call sign meaning: (serially assigned)

Technical information
- Licensing authority: FCC
- Facility ID: 141981
- Class: D
- ERP: 250 watts
- HAAT: 34 meters
- Repeater: KLTA 98.7-HD2

Links
- Public license information: Public file; LMS
- Webcast: Listen Live!
- Website: 969hitsfm.com

K245BY (96.9 FM, "96.9 Hits FM") is a translator broadcasting the rhythmic contemporary format of the HD2 subcarrier of KLTA-FM. Licensed to Moorhead, Minnesota, it serves the Fargo-Moorhead metropolitan area. The station is currently owned by Brooke Ingstad, the daughter of Radio FM Media owner James Ingstad. All the offices and studios are located at 2720 7th Ave S Street in Fargo, which is where the translator's transmitter is located. The station signed on March 15, 2015. 96.9 Hits FM and Hot Adult Contemporary sister station KLTA-FM "Big 98.7" compete against heritage top 40 (CHR) station KOYY "Y94".
