= Star Lite Motel =

Historic motel in Dilworth, Minnesota

Coordinates: 46°52′37″N 96°41′28″W

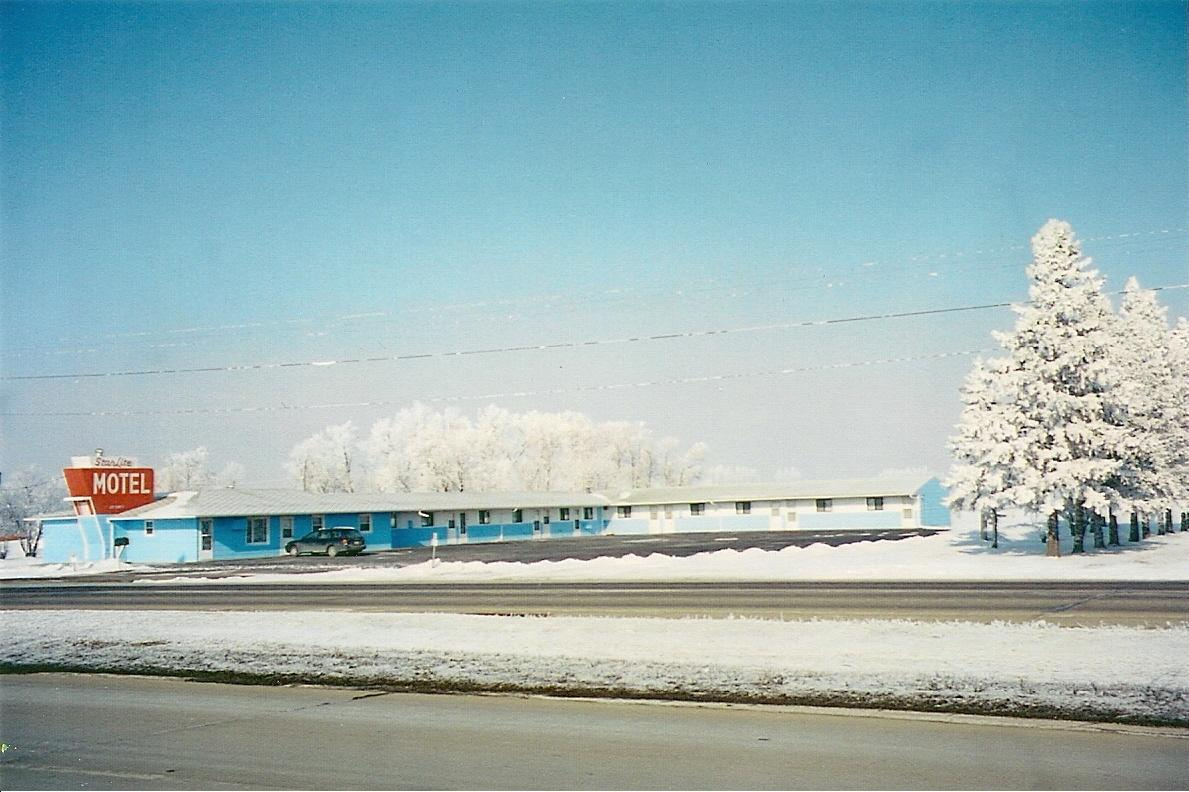
- Star Lite Motel
- Interactive map of the Star Lite Motel area
- Former names: Charley's Motel
- Alternative names: Starlite Motel

General information
- Type: Motel
- Location: 900 Center Ave E, Dilworth, Minnesota, United States
- Inaugurated: 1977 (as Star Lite Motel)

The Star Lite Motel is a historic motel building in Dilworth, Minnesota. It is one of the oldest buildings in Dilworth, and it was the oldest motel in Clay County. Earlier it was known as Charley's Motel. A previous owner, William Donovan created the "Star Lite" neon sign that is regarded as the motel's most noteworthy feature.

== Architecture ==
The motel was blue colored, L-shaped, and in a specific 1950s motel architecture style, with a red neon sign on the end of the building by the road. The sign's architectural style was recognized as historic by numerous 1950s motel historians and passersby. The motel was a single-story edifice surrounded by a large parking lot and empty fields.

== History ==
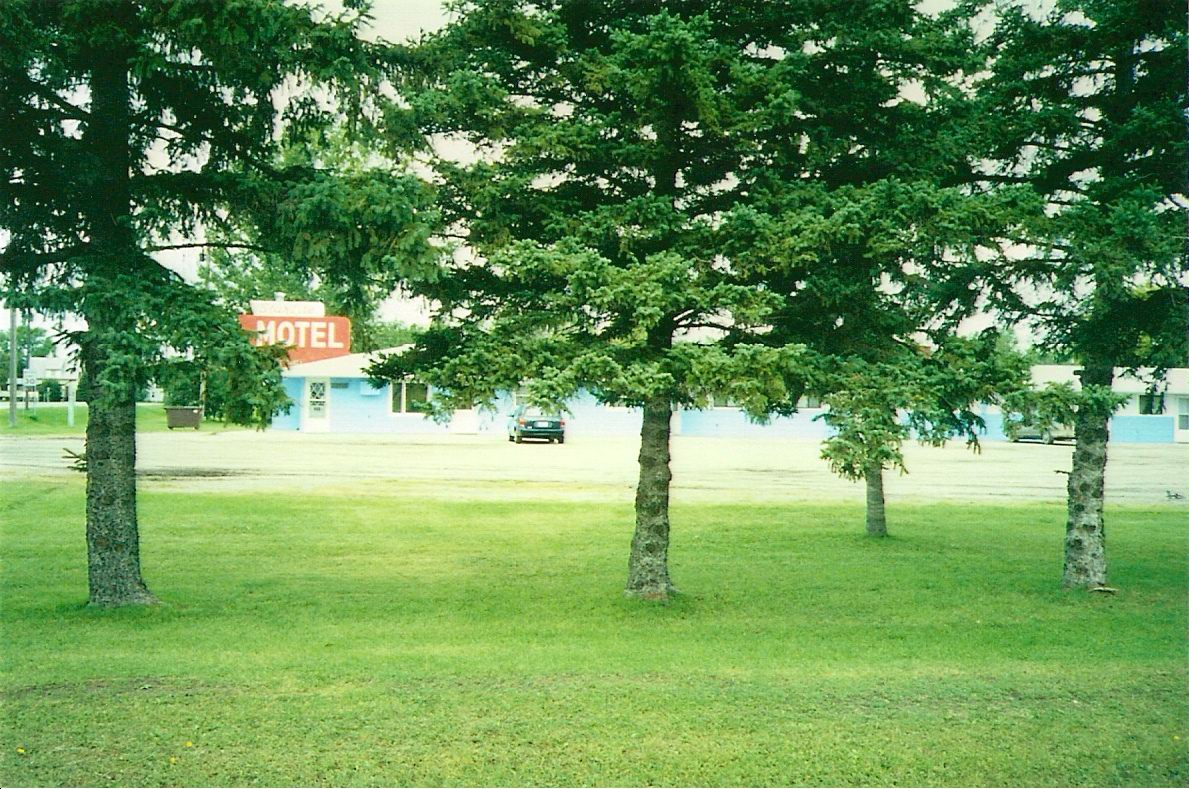
Trees in front of the motel around year 2000. Neon sign can be seen in the background.

The hotel was built in the 1950s. It was originally opened in 1959 as Charley’s Motel by Vivian Tang, and she operated it until William and Rozeana Donovan bought it in 1971 and renamed it to Star Lite. The motel operated until 2021 when it was permanently closed. William and Rozeana Donovan retired, moved to Moorhead and sold the motel to Rick Halvorson. A large section of the motel has since been razed although the neon sign and a few rooms nearest to the office were kept. In 2024, a new 7,500-square-foot building northeast of the original Star Lite Motel was constructed and the entire motel was reopened as StarLite Pet Motel by owner Katie Olson.

== See also ==
- List of motels
