= KFBN =

- Fargo, North Dakota; United States
- Broadcast area: Fargo-Moorhead
- Frequency: 88.7 MHz
- Branding: Heaven 88.7

Programming
- Format: Christian

Ownership
- Owner: Fargo Baptist Church

History
- First air date: December 8, 1997
- Call sign meaning: Fargo Baptist

Technical information
- Licensing authority: FCC
- Facility ID: 82193
- Class: C1
- ERP: 30,000 watts (horiz.); 100,000 watts (vert.)
- HAAT: 265 meters (869 ft)
- Transmitter coordinates: 47.013°N 97.194°W

Links
- Public license information: Public file; LMS
- Webcast: Listen live
- Website: kfbn.org

KFBN (88.7 FM, "Heaven 88.7") is a Christian radio station located in Fargo, North Dakota. The station is owned by Master's Baptist College, a ministry of Fargo Baptist Church. The station is also heard on a translator on 102.3 FM in Kulm.

KFBN is a non-profit radio station, receiving most of its donations and contributions from its listeners and Fargo Baptist Church. Most of the programming on Heaven 88.7 is made up of Bible teaching programs, and traditional worship music.

== Translators ==
In addition to the main station, KFBN is relayed by an additional translator to widen its broadcast area.

Call sign	Frequency	City of license	FID	ERP (W)	Class	FCC info
K272CW	102.3 FM	Kulm, North Dakota	61016	78	D	LMS
