= KBVB-HD2 =

Coordinates: 46°52′22″N 96°47′00″W

K233CY
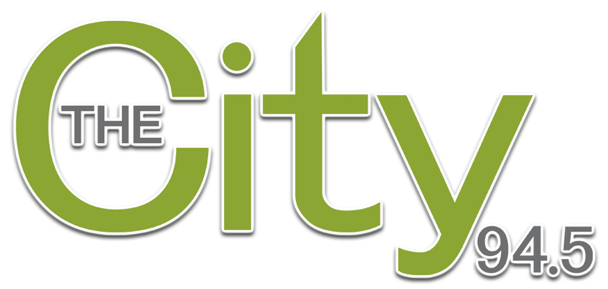
- Wahpeton, North Dakota; United States
- Broadcast area: Fargo-Moorhead
- Frequency: 94.5 MHz
- Branding: The City 94.5

Programming
- Format: Commercial; Adult Album Alternative

Ownership
- Owner: James and Brooke Ingstad; (Radio Fargo-Moorhead, Inc.)
- Sister stations: KBMW, KBVB, KLTA-FM, KPFX, KQWB, KQWB-FM, W245CM

History
- First air date: October 22, 2014
- Former call signs: K234BX (94.7)
- Call sign meaning: (serially assigned)

Technical information
- Licensing authority: FCC
- Facility ID: 152765
- Class: D
- ERP: 250 watts
- HAAT: 34 meters
- Repeater: KBVB 95.1-HD2

Links
- Public license information: Public file; LMS
- Webcast: Listen Live!
- Website: thecity945.com

K233CY (94.5 FM, "The City 94.5") is a translator broadcasting the adult album alternative format of the HD2 subcarrier of KBVB. Licensed to Wahpeton, North Dakota, it serves the Fargo-Moorhead metropolitan area. The station is currently owned by James and Brooke Ingstad, through licensee Radio Fargo-Moorhead, Inc. All the offices and studios are located at 2720 7th Ave South in Fargo, which is where the translator's transmitter is located. The station signed on as "The Loft 94.5" on October 22, 2014 only to rebrand as "The City 94.5" a week later around October 30, 2014 due to a trademark claim from SiriusXM.

== Station staff ==
- John Austin (Mon-Fri 6a-10a)
- Jay Farley (Mon-Fri 10a-3p)
- Cori Jensen (Mon-Fri 3p-7p)
