= KVOX-FM =

Radio station in Moorhead, Minnesota

- Moorhead, Minnesota; United States
- Broadcast area: Fargo–Moorhead metropolitan area
- Frequency: 99.9 MHz
- Branding: Froggy 99.9

Programming
- Format: Country
- Affiliations: Compass Media Networks

Ownership
- Owner: Midwest Communications; (Midwest Communications, Inc.)
- Sister stations: KFGO, KFGO-FM, KNFL, KOYY, KRWK

History
- First air date: November 30, 1966
- Former call signs: KIDA (1971–1977)
- Call sign meaning: FM addition to KVOX

Technical information
- Licensing authority: FCC
- Facility ID: 35864
- Class: C1
- ERP: 100,000 watts
- HAAT: 116 meters
- Transmitter coordinates: 46°49′8.9″N 96°45′57.3″W

Links
- Public license information: Public file; LMS
- Webcast: Listen Live
- Website: froggyweb.com

KVOX-FM (99.9 MHz, "Froggy 99.9") is a country radio station located in Fargo, North Dakota (licensed by the Federal Communications Commission (FCC) to twin city Moorhead, Minnesota), owned by Midwest Communications, Inc.

Its studios are located on South 25th Street in Fargo, while its transmitter is located on U.S. Route 75 just south of Moorhead.

== History ==
This station debuted on November 30, 1966, as KVOX-FM, changing call letters to KIDA on August 16, 1971.

KVOX-FM then returned on November 9, 1977, branding themselves as "Stereo Country K100". This would remain as their branding until April 1, 1994, when they officially released "on-air", the "Froggy" Moniker which is still used to this day. It was at this point the station "frogified" everything as they do today. For example, the studio is called the "Frogpond", the phone line is called the "Frogline", their forecast called the "Frogcast", and until Fall 2009, "frogified" on-air names (such as Pete Moss, Hoppy Gilmore and Jeremiah Bullfrog). They have since moved towards regular on-air names.

In 2009, Froggy rebranded as "Number One For New Country, Today's Froggy 99.9."

== Ownership ==
In May 1999, Triad Broadcasting reached a deal to acquire this station (along with KQWB 1660 AM (Sports), KQWB-FM 98.7 (Active rock), KLTA 105.1 (Hot AC), and KPFX 107.9 (Classic rock)) from brothers Jim and Tom Ingstad as part of a twelve-station deal valued at a reported $37.8 million.

On November 30, 2012, Triad Broadcasting signed a Definitive Agreement to sell all 32 of their stations to Larry Wilson's L&L Broadcasting for $21 Million. Upon completion of the sale on May 1, 2013, L&L in turn sold the Fargo stations to Jim Ingstad, who had just sold his competing cluster to Midwest Communications. An LMA (Local Marketing Agreement) was placed so Ingstad could take immediate control of the stations, and the sale became final July 2, 2013. The sale was worth $9.5 million.

On May 7, 2013, less than a week after the second sale, a new term of Ingstad's original sale to Midwest Communications came to light. It was announced that Ingstad and Midwest would swap country stations. This would send Froggy to Midwest, and competitor KBVB (“Bob 95”) back into the hands of Ingstad. The swap took place on August 5, 2013. Following the ownership swap, the contracts of morning show hosts Jesse James, Amanda Lea and Pike Taylor were withheld by Radio FM Media under the agreement that they could not be put on KBVB. After a brief hiatus, the trio began hosting the morning show at KLTA (“Big 98.7”).

== Former DJs ==
- Mike Dylan
- Jeremiah Bullfrog (Now "Farley" at KBVB-FM and KPFX))
- Hoppy Gilmore
- Hopalong Cassidy
- Anne Phibian
- Pete Moss (Kyle Matthews)
- Splash Gordon (Moose Johnson, Now at KPFX)
- Wade N. Pool
- Anita Fly
- Dennis Hopper
- Marina Bay
- Leah Leaper (Leah Lundberg)
- Sally Mander
- Holly Hopper (Denise Curtis)
- Tad Pole (Paul Bougie, Now at WDAY (AM))
- I. B. Green
- Jesse James (Now at KUBL)
- Amanda Lea
- Pike Taylor
- Alek
- Shawn Reed
- Lilly Pad
- Joey Shaw
- Jimmy Hoppa (Now a Technical Director at FOX Sports and CBS Sports)
- Ben Merritt (Ben Chartier)
- Natalie Nash
- Elliot (Now at KOYY-FM)
- Kendra
- Taco
- Jamie Mac
- Trace
- Paige Turner
- Ryan Kelly (Later at KRWK, returned to KVOX August 2026)
- Jake Litwin (former afternoon and brand manager)
- Hannah Damas
- Tank McNamara
- Scotch
