= WZFG =

- Dilworth, Minnesota; United States
- Broadcast area: Fargo-Moorhead
- Frequency: 1100 kHz
- Branding: AM 1100 The Flag

Programming
- Format: Conservative talk radio
- Affiliations: Fox News Radio; Salem Radio Network; Westwood One

Ownership
- Owner: Flag Family Media; (Bakken Beacon Media, LLC)
- Sister stations: WDAY

History
- Former call signs: WZFN (2006–2008)
- Call sign meaning: "Flag"

Technical information
- Licensing authority: FCC
- Facility ID: 135930
- Class: B
- Power: 50,000 watts (day); 5,000 watts (critical hours); 440 watts (night)
- Transmitter coordinates: 46°45′43.9″N 96°40′20.3″W
- Translator: 92.3 K222DF (Dilworth)

Links
- Public license information: Public file; LMS
- Webcast: Listen live
- Website: am1100theflag.com

WZFG (1100 AM, "The Flag") is a radio station serving the Fargo-Moorhead market, licensed to Dilworth, Minnesota.

== History ==
WZFN was originally owned by Brantley Broadcast Associates based in Alabama. WZFN was sold to Scott Hennen's SMAHH Communications of Fargo in April, 2008.

WZFG was granted special temporary authority to remain at 50,000 watts 24 hours a day in order to expand coverage of the 2009 Red River flood.

In the September 8, 2010 issue of The Forum of Fargo-Moorhead, it was announced that Scott Hennen was removed as president and CEO of Great Plains Integrated Marketing, by the board of directors, effective that day. Other local outlets reported that "effective immediately, he will no longer be an employee, and therefore no longer running day to day operations". Later in 2010, Hennen returned to AM1100 in an afternoon program, replacing his friend Sean Hannity. This program lasted until the summer of 2011, when then-program director Bruce Kelly replaced the Hennen show with the syndicated Ed Schultz show (Schultz, ironically, was Hennen's longtime local rival in the Fargo market before fronting a national show.) In March 2012, the Rush Limbaugh program, which had run on AM1100 since it first signed on the air, moved to the new "101.9 Talk FM" (KRWK). KRWK returned to its previous rock format in September 2013; Limbaugh's program then returned to WZFG.

In September 2014, Sean Hannity returned to the air on WZFG. Hannity had been off the air in eastern North Dakota since 2013.
