= KEGK =

Radio station in Wahpeton–Fargo, North Dakota

Coordinates: 46.546°N 96.628°W

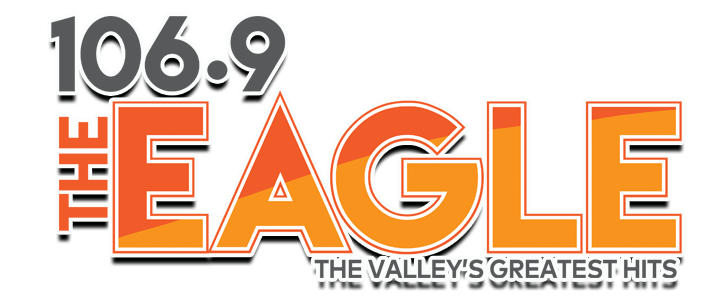
- Wahpeton, North Dakota; United States
- Broadcast area: Fargo-Moorhead
- Frequency: 106.9 MHz (HD Radio)
- Branding: 106.9 The Eagle

Programming
- Format: Classic hits
- Affiliations: Premiere Networks; United Stations Radio Networks; Westwood One

Ownership
- Owner: Brooke Ingstad; (Radio Wahpeton Breckenridge, LLC)

History
- First air date: 1988 (as KGWB at 107.1)
- Former call signs: KGWB (1988–2003)
- Former frequencies: 107.1 MHz (1988–2003)

Technical information
- Licensing authority: FCC
- Facility ID: 25533
- Class: C2
- ERP: 41,000 watts
- HAAT: 164 meters

Links
- Public license information: Public file; LMS
- Webcast: Listen Live
- Website: 1069eagle.com

KEGK (106.9 FM, "The Eagle") is a classic hits radio station serving the Fargo-Moorhead area, licensed to Wahpeton, North Dakota, and primarily plays rock and pop music from the 1970s and 1980s. The station is owned by Brooke Ingstad, through licensee Radio Wahpeton Breckenridge, LLC. Its studios are located at 2720 7th Ave. South in Fargo, while its transmitter is located east of Wolverton.

== History ==
KGWB 107.1 FM signed on as a 3,000 watt Class A radio station serving Wahpeton, North Dakota with a CHR/AC hybrid format. It continued in this format until the late 1990s, when the format was changed to oldies. In 2003, Triad Broadcasting signed a local marketing agreement with Guderian Broadcasting to operate KGWB. The station moved to studios in Fargo, and its frequency was moved to 106.9. The power was upgraded to 41,000 watts to bring a signal to Fargo-Moorhead, and the call sign was changed to KEGK with the "Eagle 106.9" moniker.

On March 18, 2008, the FCC ordered Triad to terminate its JSA to operate KEGK within 90 days. The order was a result of a 2004 rule change that counts JSA's towards ownership cap limits. The FCC had previously granted Triad a waiver to continue the JSA because Clear Channel was grandfathered at one extra station when the 2004 rule change occurred. However, that situation ended when Clear Channel sold its Fargo group and one station was divested, leading the FCC to decide that Triad's waiver was no longer needed.

On April 17, 2008, it was announced that Scott Hennen's of Fargo bought KEGK. It became the sister station of 50,000 watt AM 1100 WZFG.

In the September 8, 2010 edition of the Fargo Forum, it was announced that Scott Hennen was removed as President and CEO of Great Plains Integrated Marketing, by the Board of Directors, effective 9/8/2010. Other local outlets reported that "effective immediately, he will no longer be an employee, and therefore no longer running day-to-day operations".

== Program schedule ==
- Bo and Megan In The Morning (Mon-Fri 6am-9am)
- Bo (Mon-Fri 9 am-10 am)
- Megan (Mon-Fri 10 am-2 pm)
- Jeff Left (Mon-Fri 2 pm-6 pm)
- Ian (Weekends)

== Former DJs ==
- Emily West
- Shelly Knight
- Tim Murphy
- Mike Ray
- Nicole McCartney
- Jim Daniels
- Diane Karol
- Kris Kraft
- Pete Serria
- Sandi Beach
- Wanda Maj
- Jessie Aamodt
- Shawna Olson
- Maggie May
- Paul Bougie
- Chris Daniels
- Jay Farley
- Mike Ray
- John The Fireman
- Dan Michaels
