= KQWB (AM) =

Coordinates: 46°58′32.9″N 96°35′3.3″W

- West Fargo, North Dakota; United States
- Broadcast area: Fargo-Moorhead
- Frequency: 1660 kHz C-QUAM AM stereo
- Branding: Bison 1660

Programming
- Format: Sports
- Affiliations: Fox Sports Radio; Sports USA Radio Network; North Dakota State Bison

Ownership
- Owner: Radio FM Media; (Radio Fargo-Moorhead, Inc.)
- Sister stations: K233CY, KBVB, KPFX, KLTA-FM, KQWB-FM, KBMW, W245CM

History
- First air date: March 1960 (as KUTT on 1550 kHz)
- Former call signs: KUTT (1960–1965); KQWB (1965–1995); KQFN (1995-96); KQJD (2000-sign off of 1550 kHz)
- Former frequencies: 1550 kHz (1960–2000)
- Call sign meaning: disambiguation of former sister station of KDWB

Technical information
- Licensing authority: FCC
- Facility ID: 87146
- Class: B
- Power: 10,000 watts day 1,000 watts night
- Translator: 92.7 K224FD (Fargo)
- Repeater: 107.9-3 KPFX-HD3

Links
- Public license information: Public file; LMS
- Webcast: Listen Live
- Website: bison1660.com

KQWB (1660 kHz, "Bison 1660") is an American AM radio station located in Fargo, North Dakota (licensed by the Federal Communications Commission (FCC) to adjacent West Fargo, North Dakota), owned by Jim Ingstad's Radio FM Media. Its studios are located on 7th Avenue South in Fargo, while its transmitter array is located north of Glyndon.

== Programming ==
KQWB Formats
| Name | Format |
|---|---|
| KUTT | CHR/Top 40 (1960–1965) |
| KQWB | CHR/Top 40 (1965–1982) |
| KQWB 1550 | Full service (1982–1995) |
| 1550 The Fan | Sports Talk (1995–1996) |
| Star 1550 | Easy listening (1996–2000) |
| Star 1660 | Easy listening (2000–2003) |
| Talk Radio 1660 | Talk radio (2003–2007) |
| 1660 ESPN | Sports Talk (2007–2012) |
| True Oldies 1660 | Oldies (2012–2014) |
| Willie @ 1660 | Classic Country (2014–2015) |
| Fox Sports 1660 | Sports Talk (2015–2016) |
| Bison 1660 | Sports Talk (2016–present) |

KQWB airs game broadcasts and sports talk programs themed around the athletics programs of North Dakota State University, with Fox Sports Radio as a sustaining service. National Fox Sports radio shows include The Dan Patrick Show, The Herd with Colin Cowherd, The Doug Gottlieb show, JT The Brick with Tomm Looney and The Jason Smith Show. KQWB also airs national College Football and NFL broadcasts from Sports USA.

Local talk programs include the daily shows 'The Insiders' with Jeff Culhane (Program Director and play by play voice for NDSU Bison football and men's basketball) and Jeremy Jorgensen (Director of Broadcasting at NDSU) and 'The Brakedown' with Keith Brake (Assistant PD and women's play-by-play voice).

The station also airs live North Dakota State Bison football, men's basketball, baseball, softball, women's basketball, and volleyball games. It also airs live pregame and post game reaction call in shows. Weekly live coaches shows with head football coach Tim Polasek, men's basketball coach David Richman, and women's basketball coach Jory Collins air during the season in the evening.

== History ==
KQWB originated as KUTT, owned by Music Broadcasters, which went on the air in March 1960 at 1550 kHz with a Top 40 format. Its signal was 5 kW daytime only, from transmitter on Old Highway 75 north of Moorhead, and its studios were in Downtown Fargo. The station was bought in 1965 by Midwest Radio and the station's call letters were changed to KQWB (inspired by KDWB in Minneapolis).

In 1975, KQWB was granted a construction permit to add a 5 kW nighttime signal from the site of KQWB-FM north of Glyndon, while keeping its daytime signal from the transmitter site North of Moorhead. The North Moorhead location became home to its studio in 1978 and where it remained until moving into the WDAY building in 1997. Later in 1978, KQWB was granted a daytime power increase to 10 kW from the Glyndon transmitter.

As Top 40 stations across the United States moved to FM in the 1980s, KQWB transitioned to an Adult Standards format. KQWB maintained that operation until being sold to Ingstad Broadcasting in 1995. The station changed to a sports format and changed its call letters to KQFN ("The Fan"). In 1996, the station reverted to the KQWB call letters, airing an easy listening format as "Star 1550".

=== Expanded Band assignment ===
On March 17, 1997 the FCC announced that eighty-eight stations had been given permission to move to newly available "Expanded Band" transmitting frequencies, ranging from 1610 to 1700 kHz, with KQWB authorized to move from 1550 to 1660 kHz.

A construction permit for the expanded band station on 1660 kHz was assigned the call letters KQJD on February 9, 1998. The FCC's initial policy was that both the original station and its expanded band counterpart could operate simultaneously for up to five years, after which owners would have to turn in one of the two licenses, depending on whether they preferred the new assignment or elected to remain on the original frequency.

The 1550 kHz night pattern at this point consisted of five towers and was difficult and expensive to maintain, while operation on 1660 kHz was authorized for 10 kW day and 1 kW night, using a single non-directional tower. On September 1, 2000, the two stations swapped call letters, with KQWB moving from 1550 AM to 1660 AM, and KQJD transferred from 1660 AM to 1550 AM. The original station on 1550 kHz, now KQJD, ceased broadcasting, yielding the transmitter site to the 1660 kHz operations, and on June 8, 2001 its license was formally cancelled.

=== Later history ===
The easy listening format was switched to a full-time talk format in 2003 as "Talk Radio 1660", with the lineup made up of mostly syndicated conservative talk programming, and CNN Radio. The Ed Schultz Show was added to the lineup in 2006, after being removed from KFGO.

On April 23, 2007, the station returned to an all-sports format, this time affiliating with ESPN, and adopting the name "1660 ESPN". In addition to ESPN programming the station carried the "Sports Talk with Joe (Soucheray) and Pat (Reusse)", "Garage Logic", and "Saturday Sports Talk" programs from its Twin Cities sister-ESPN affiliate KSTP. When CNN Radio shut down on April 1, 2012, KQWB replaced it with NBC Radio.

On April 20, 2012, at 6 p.m., KQWB dropped ESPN for the True Oldies Channel as "True Oldies 1660", "dedicated to honoring the greatest Rock & Roll music ever recorded." True Oldies 1660 continued to cover Concordia and Moorhead High School football, basketball, and hockey games during the school year. In September 2013, Radio FM Media began to operate KZDR through a JSA with Mediactive, LLC and was launched as "92.7 The Drive" with a classic hits format that, in a way, competed with True Oldies 1660. This was a non-issue, however, as other plans were in store for KQWB.

Logo from Willie 1660, former format

On April 21, 2014, KQWB changed to a Classic Country format under the moniker "Willie 1660". The first song on "Willie" was "Mama Don't Let Your Babies Grow Up to be Cowboys" by Willie Nelson. The station was jukebox style, with core artists including George Strait, Willie Nelson, Dolly Parton, Waylon Jennings, Garth Brooks, and Kenny Rogers.

=== Back to Sports, Home of the Bison ===
On July 23, 2015, at 9 p.m., after playing "All My Rowdy Friends (Have Settled Down)" by Hank Williams, Jr., KQWB switched back to sports, this time affiliating with Fox Sports Radio. The station ran 100% of the Fox Sports Radio schedule, as well as local games from Moorhead High School and Concorida College (Moorhead) as they had been.

On March 29, 2016, Radio FM Media and North Dakota State University announced that the radio rights for NDSU Bison Athletics would move to Radio FM Media; sister KPFX would become the flagship station for Football and Men's Basketball, and KQWB the flagship for Women's Basketball. It was also announced that KQWB would re-brand as Bison 1660 and would focus on NDSU oriented sports programming. On May 18, 2016, it was announced that Jeff Culhane would become the next radio voice of the Bison and would be the program director of the station.

On August 1, 2016, Radio FM Media launched the Bison 1660 format, carrying exclusive NDSU Bison Athletics content including the re-air of games and Bison-based talk shows. It has also become a platform to air other North Dakota State University Bison sports, airing 24 NDSU Baseball games in 2017, as well as select Softball, Soccer, and Volleyball games. An FM translator on 92.7 was added in September 2016.

=== AM stereo and HD simulcast ===
In the 1980s KQWB added AM Stereo to the station, becoming the only station in the Fargo market to ever do so. After a studio move in 1997, KQWB was forced to turn off AM Stereo because the station was unable to get two audio channels to the transmitter. The capability to broadcast in AM Stereo was retained when the station moved from 1550 kHz to 1660 kHz in 2000, but was never turned back on because it had one channel audio at the transmitter site.

In October 2014, sister station KBVB became the first commercial station in the market in the market to broadcast in HD. A few weeks later after the launch of HD1 and HD2 on KBVB, HD3 began simulcasting KQWB. A few weeks later in November 2014, KQWB began broadcasting in AM Stereo again, with the AM signal being fed by KBVB-HD3. KQWB's programming has since moved to KPFX-HD3. As of 2016 KQWB still broadcasts in AM Stereo, however most of the talk programming on KQWB is produced in mono.

== Ownership ==
Music Broadcasters signed on KQWB in 1960. The station was sold to Midwest Radio in 1965. It 1995 brothers Jim and Tom Ingstad bought KQWB and KQWB-FM (now KLTA).

In May 1999, Triad Broadcasting reached a deal to acquire KQWB (along with KVOX-FM, KQWB-FM, KLTA, and KPFX) from the Ingstads as part of a twelve-station deal valued at a reported $37.8 million.

On November 30, 2012, Triad Broadcasting signed a Definitive Agreement to sell all 32 of its stations to Larry Wilson's L&L Broadcasting for $21 million. Upon completion of the sale on May 1, 2013, L&L, in turn, sold the Fargo stations to Jim Ingstad, who had just sold his competing cluster to Midwest Communications. A Local Marketing Agreement (LMA) was placed so Ingstad could take immediate control of the stations, and the sale became final July 2, 2013. The sale was worth $9.5 million. This is the second time Jim Ingstad has owned KQWB.
