= KBMW-FM =

Radio station in Breckenridge, Minnesota

- Breckenridge, Minnesota; United States
- Broadcast area: Wahpeton, North Dakota/Breckenridge, Minnesota
- Frequency: 92.7 MHz
- Branding: B92.7

Programming
- Format: Hot adult contemporary

Ownership
- Owner: Robert J. Ingstad; (I3G Media, LLC)
- Sister stations: KBMW

History
- First air date: 1984 (as KDDR-FM at 92.3)
- Former call signs: KDDR-FM (1984–1992); KSSZ-FM (1992–1995); KPHT (1995–1999); KULW (1999–2007); KFNL (2007–2013); KZDR (2013–2016)
- Former frequencies: 92.3 MHz (1984–1992)
- Call sign meaning: Breckenridge, Minnesota, and Wahpeton

Technical information
- Licensing authority: FCC
- Facility ID: 10066
- Class: A
- ERP: 6,000 watts
- HAAT: 46 meters (151 ft)
- Transmitter coordinates: 46°16′50″N 96°35′17″W

Links
- Public license information: Public file; LMS
- Webcast: Listen Live
- Website: b927.net

KBMW-FM (92.7 MHz) is an American radio station that airs a hot adult contemporary format. Licensed to Breckenridge, Minnesota, it serves Wahpeton-Breckenridge and the southern Red River Valley. The station is owned by Robert Ingstad's I3G Media, LLC.

== History ==
Formats of KBMW-FM
Name (call signs)	Format
KDDR-FM 92.3	Full service (1984–1992)
92.7 Kiss FM (KSSZ)	CHR/Top 40 (1992–1995)
92.7 Power 92 (KPHT)	Cont. Christian music (1995–1999)
Kool 92.7 (KULW)	Oldies (1999–2001)
B93 (KFAB-FM)	Country (2001–2003)
Outlaw Country 92.7	Classic country (2003–2005)
92.7 My FM	Adult hits (May–October 2005)
Outlaw Country 92.7	Classic country (2005–2007)
Legacy 92.7 (KFNL)	Adult Cont. Christian (2007–2012)
92.7 The Bone (KFNL)	Active Rock (2012–2013)
92.7 The Drive (KZDR)	Classic Hits (2013–2016)
B92.7 (KBMW-FM)	Hot Adult Contemporary (September 2016 – present)

=== From Oakes to Fargo ===
The station began life in 1984 as KDDR-FM on 92.3 FM in Oakes, North Dakota. In 1992, the station moved to 92.7 FM, and changed its city of license to Kindred, North Dakota to serve the nearby Fargo-Moorhead area, and changed the call sign to KSSZ-FM to reflect its change to a Top 40/CHR format as "92.7 Kiss FM". KSSZ changed to a contemporary Christian music format as "Power 92", and changed its call sign to KPHT in 1995.

The station became KULW with an oldies format as "Kool 92.7" in 1999, and sold to Clear Channel Communications in 2000. In 2001, it changed to "B93" with a country music format, with the call sign KFAB-FM. B93 moved towards a classic country format and changed its name to "Outlaw Country" in 2003. In May 2005, KFAB-FM became Fargo's Adult Hits outlet with the "My FM" moniker; the station would revert its previous country format and "Outlaw Country" moniker that October.

KFAB-FM's owner at the time, Clear Channel Communications, sold its Fargo stations to James Ingstad's Radio Fargo-Moorhead, Inc. on January 19, 2007. KFAB-FM was transferred to Northwestern College, for WDAY-FM's use of KFNW-FM's tower. The Federal Communications Commission (FCC) ownership limit of the Fargo market was six stations, though at the time Clear Channel grandfathered KDAM, the seventh station.

KFAB-FM signed off the air on January 19, 2007, transitioning ownership from Clear Channel Communications (now Radio Fargo-Moorhead, Inc.) to Northwestern College, and signed on as KFNL, "Legacy 92.7", with an adult standards format on February 5, 2007. It later switched to an adult contemporary Christian format concentrating on praise and worship music.

In March 2012, Northwestern College sold KFNL to Robert Ingstad's Mediactive, LCC. The station changed to active rock as "92.7 The Bone" on March 29, 2012, competing against KQWB-FM "Q98" (then owned by Triad Broadcasting).

On February 28, 2013, KFNL went silent. The station changed its call sign on September 3, 2013, to KZDR, and, on September 6, it came back on air playing all-Taylor Swift music as Taylor 92.7. Five days later, on the 11th, KZDR introduced a Classic Hits format as 92.7 The Drive, promoting themselves as "Fargo's Greatest Hits". This was in conjunction of a major 2013 radio shuffle in Fargo-Moorhead that involved 5 stations changing formats.

=== Move to Breckenridge, Minnesota ===
On February 23, 2016, it was announced that Rob Ingstad would sell KZDR to Brooke Ingstad's Radio Wahpeton-Breckenridge, and move the station to Breckenridge, Minnesota. As part of the deal, 92.7 would also downgrade to a Class A FM and transmit from the tower of its new AM sister, KBMW, which itself was recently acquired from Brooke's father, Jim Ingstad. The sale was priced at $275,000.

On June 1, 2016, at Midnight, after playing "The Load-Out" by Jackson Browne, KZDR began simulcasting its new sister station KEGK, ending the "Drive" format. On August 9, at 2 p.m., KZDR signed off for the last time from Fargo. A little over a week later, the station relaunched with a hot adult contemporary format branded as "B92.7", from its new studios in Wahpeton. KZDR officially changed its call letters to KBMW-FM on August 22.

Brooke Ingstad sold KBMW-FM and sister station KBMW to cousin Robert Ingstad's I3G Media, LLC effective December 31, 2017 for $925,000.
