= WDAY =

- W-Day can refer to a military designation

WDAY is the call sign of a TV station and a radio station in Fargo, North Dakota, all except WDAY AM and FM are owned by Forum Communications:

- WDAY (AM) 970; a news/talk radio station
- WDAY-TV 6.1; an ABC affiliate in Fargo, North Dakota, with Justice Network on digital subchannel 6.2; WDAY'Z Xtra on digital subchannel 6.3
- WDAZ-TV 8.1; an ABC affiliate in Grand Forks, North Dakota, with Justice Network on digital subchannel 8.2; WDAY'Z Xtra on digital subchannel 8.3
- KOYY 93.7; a top 40 radio station, owned by Midwest Communications, which held the call sign WDAY-FM from 1965 to 2015
