= Harwood, North Dakota =

- City
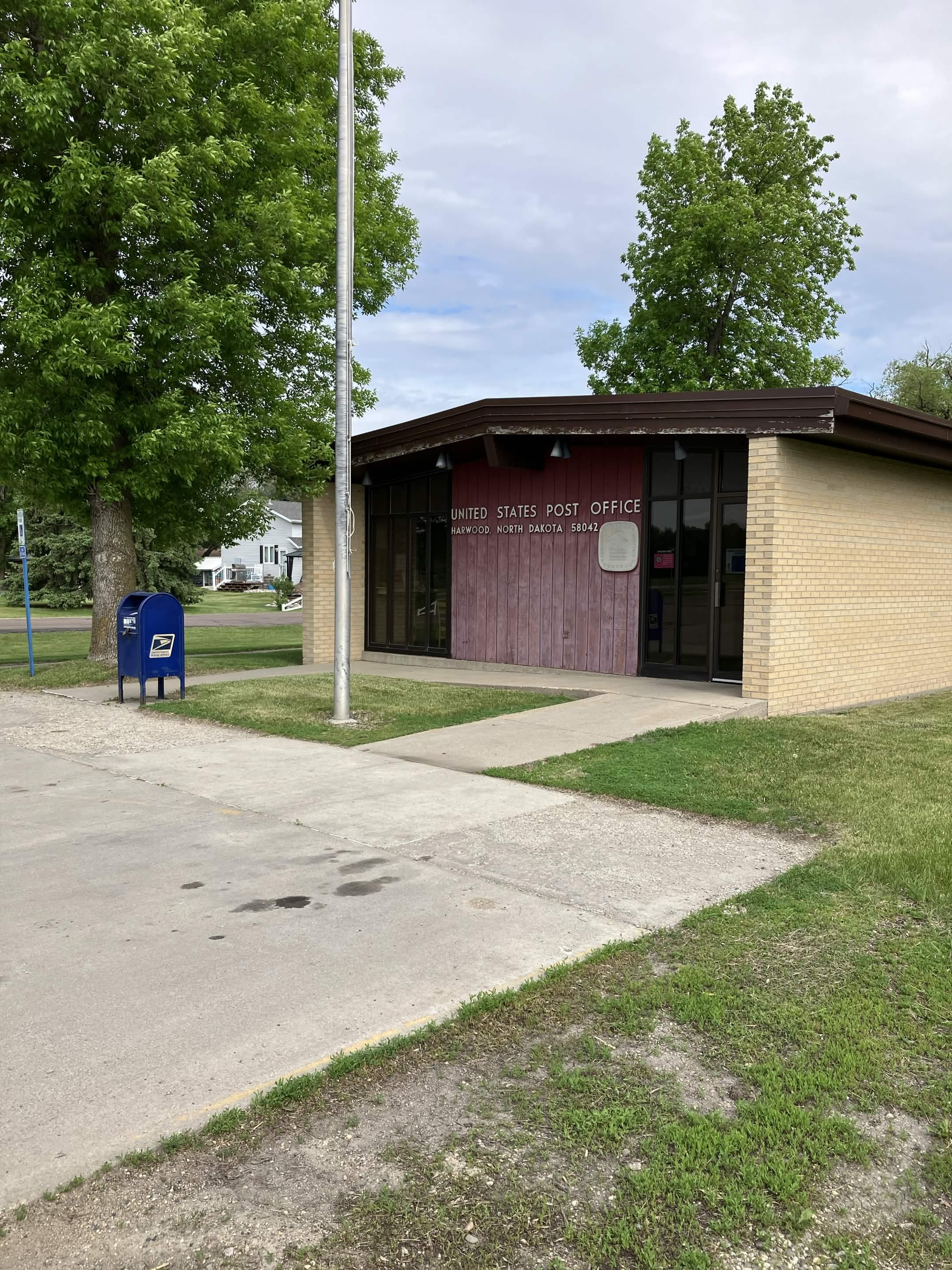

- Logo
- Motto: "It's All Good!"
- Location of Harwood, North Dakota
- Coordinates: 46°58′37″N 96°52′52″W
- Country: United States
- State: North Dakota
- County: Cass
- Founded: 1881

Government
  - Mayor: Blake Hankey

Area
  - Total: 1.31 sq mi (3.40 km^{2})
  - Land: 1.31 sq mi (3.38 km^{2})
  - Water: 0.0077 sq mi (0.02 km^{2})
- Elevation: 889 ft (271 m)

Population (2020)
  - Total: 794
  - Estimate (2022): 818
  - Density: 609.1/sq mi (235.17/km^{2})
- Time zone: UTC-6 (Central (CST))
  - Summer (DST): UTC-5 (CDT)
- ZIP code: 58042
- Area code: 701
- FIPS code: 38-35940
- GNIS feature ID: 1036084
- Website: www.cityofharwood.com

Harwood is a city in Cass County, North Dakota, United States. The population was 794 at the 2020 census. It has become a bedroom community of the nearby Fargo-Moorhead area. Harwood was founded in 1881. A data center is expected to be completed in 2027 and to "net the town $1.65 million in property taxes once fully completed."

== History ==
Harwood was platted in 1881 when the Great Northern Railroad was extended to that point. The city was named in honor of A. J. Harwood, the original owner of the town site. A post office has been in operation at Harwood since 1881.

== Geography ==
According to the United States Census Bureau, the city has a total area of 1.27 square miles (3.29 km^{2}), of which 1.26 square miles (3.26 km^{2}) is land and 0.01 square miles (0.03 km^{2}) is water.

== Demographics ==
Historical population
Census	Pop.	Note	%±
1980	326		—
1990	590		81.0%
2000	607		2.9%
2010	718		18.3%
2020	794		10.6%
2022 (est.)	818		3.0%
U.S. Decennial Census; 2020 Census

=== 2010 census ===
As of the census of 2010, there were 718 people, 241 households, and 216 families living in the city. The population density was 569.8 inhabitants per square mile (220.0/km^{2}). There were 248 housing units at an average density of 196.8 per square mile (76.0/km^{2}). The racial makeup of the city was 98.6% White, 0.1% African American, 0.8% Native American, and 0.4% from two or more races. Hispanic or Latino of any race were 0.1% of the population.

There were 241 households, of which 45.6% had children under the age of 18 living with them, 83.0% were married couples living together, 2.9% had a female householder with no husband present, 3.7% had a male householder with no wife present, and 10.4% were non-families. 6.6% of all households were made up of individuals, and 2.9% had someone living alone who was 65 years of age or older. The average household size was 2.98 and the average family size was 3.12.

The median age in the city was 34.4 years. 29.8% of residents were under the age of 18; 5.1% were between the ages of 18 and 24; 31.6% were from 25 to 44; 28.3% were from 45 to 64; and 5.2% were 65 years of age or older. The gender makeup of the city was 51.4% male and 48.6% female.

=== 2000 census ===
As of the census of 2000, there were 607 people, 192 households, and 174 families living in the city. The population density was 517.9 inhabitants per square mile (200.0/km^{2}). There were 201 housing units at an average density of 171.5 per square mile (66.2/km^{2}). The racial makeup of the city was 99.01% White, 0.33% from other races, and 0.66% from two or more races. Hispanic or Latino of any race were 0.66% of the population.

There were 192 households, out of which 56.3% had children under the age of 18 living with them, 84.9% were married couples living together, 3.6% had a female householder with no husband present, and 8.9% were non-families. 5.7% of all households were made up of individuals, and 1.6% had someone living alone who was 65 years of age or older. The average household size was 3.16 and the average family size was 3.31.

In the city, the population was spread out, with 33.8% under the age of 18, 4.9% from 18 to 24, 32.8% from 25 to 44, 25.7% from 45 to 64, and 2.8% who were 65 years of age or older. The median age was 34 years. For every 100 females, there were 105.8 males. For every 100 females age 18 and over, there were 106.2 males.

The median income for a household in the city was $57,500, and the median income for a family was $60,625. Males had a median income of $39,625 versus $24,479 for females. The per capita income for the city was $21,191. About 1.7% of families and 1.5% of the population were below the poverty line, including 2.8% of those under age 18 and none of those age 65 or over.

== Transportation ==
Amtrak’s Empire Builder, which operates between Seattle/Portland and Chicago, passes through the town on BNSF tracks, but makes no stop. The nearest station is located in Fargo, 9 miles (14 km) to the south.

== Notable person ==
- Dane Boedigheimer, actor and filmmaker who created Annoying Orange.
