= Dilworth, Minnesota =

City in Minnesota, United States

- City
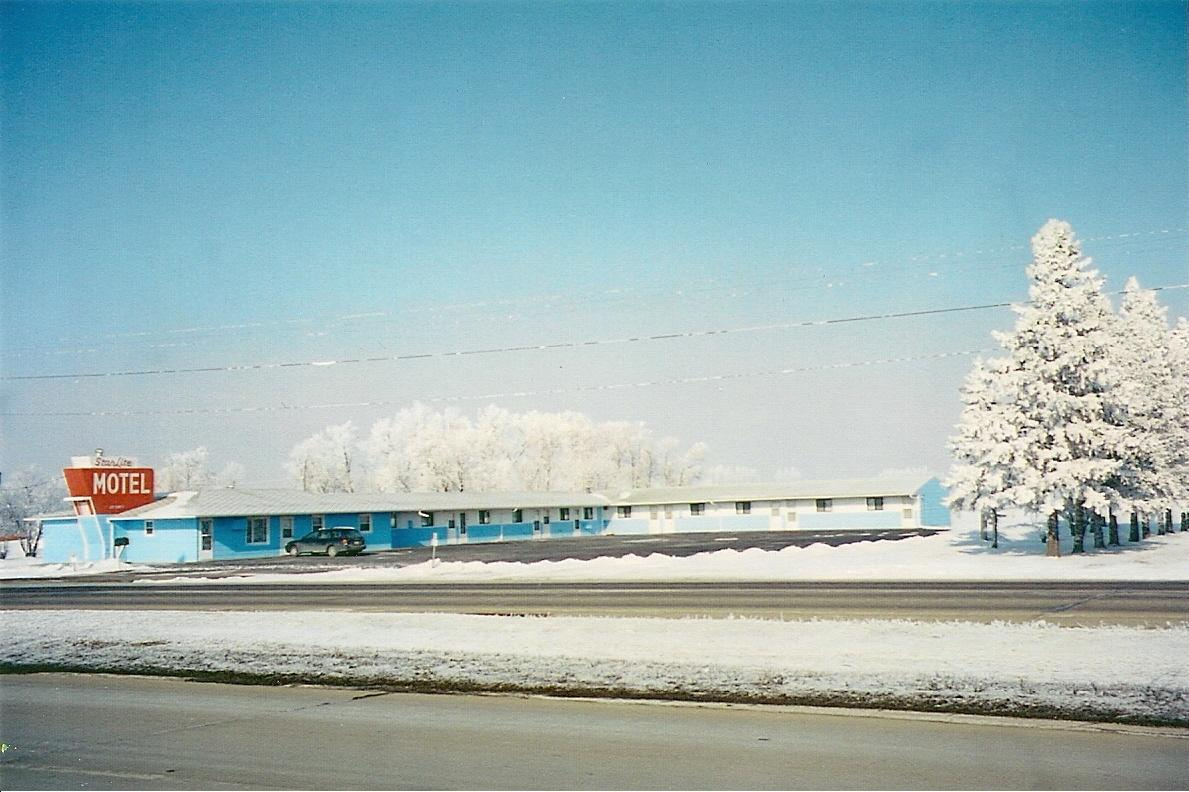
- Star Lite Motel

- Nickname: D-town
- Location of Dilworth in Clay County, Minnesota
- Coordinates: 46°52′46.25″N 96°41′54.60″W
- Country: United States
- State: Minnesota
- County: Clay
- Founded: 1883
- Incorporated: August 17, 1911

Government
  - Type: Mayor-Council
  - Mayor: Chad Olson
  - Vice Mayor: Julie Nash
  - Councilmember: Amber Borah; Dave Steichen; Kevin Peterson

Area
  - City: 3.464 sq mi (8.972 km^{2})
  - Land: 3.461 sq mi (8.963 km^{2})
  - Water: 0.0027 sq mi (0.007 km^{2})
- Elevation: 909 ft (277 m)

Population (2020)
  - City: 4,612
  - Estimate (2023): 4,772
  - Density: 1,483/sq mi (572.6/km^{2})
  - Urban: 216,214
  - Metro: 262,620
- Time zone: UTC−6 (Central)
  - Summer (DST): UTC−5 (CDT)
- ZIP Code: 56529
- Area code: 218
- FIPS code: 27-15976
- GNIS feature ID: 2394536
- Sales tax: 7.375%
- Website: cityofdilworth.com

Dilworth is a city in Clay County, Minnesota, United States. The population was 4,612 at the time of the 2020 census. Dilworth is one of the core cities of the Fargo–Moorhead metro area; it is on the eastern border of Moorhead. Dilworth is home to the historic Star Lite Motel and the Dilworth Rail Yard, one of the BNSF Railway's largest and busiest facilities in Minnesota.

== History ==
Dilworth was founded in 1883 when the Northern Pacific Railroad was extended to that point. It was named for Joseph Dilworth, a railroad official.

Dilworth, a city in Moorhead Township, incorporated as a village on August 17, 1911; the community began in 1883 as a railroad siding, called Richardson for a few months, then renamed to honor coffee importer Joseph Dilworth, one of the original stockholders and a director of the Northern Pacific Railroad, residing in Pittsburgh, Pa., who purchased 4,000 acres in the vicinity and became one of the largest landholders along the railroad. It was the largest railroad village in western Minnesota when the Northern Pacific Railroad built its depot in section 11 in 1906. The townsite was platted in 1906, and the post office began in 1907. The village was often called Little Italy for the large Italian immigrant group who settled here.

== Geography ==
According to the United States Census Bureau, the city has an area of 3.464 square miles (8.97 km^{2}), of which 3.461 square miles (8.96 km^{2}) is land and 0.003 square miles (0.01 km^{2}) is water.

== Demographics ==
Historical population
Census	Pop.	Note	%±
1920	882		—
1930	983		11.5%
1940	1,068		8.6%
1950	1,429		33.8%
1960	2,102		47.1%
1970	2,321		10.4%
1980	2,585		11.4%
1990	2,562		−0.9%
2000	3,001		17.1%
2010	4,024		34.1%
2020	4,612		14.6%
2023 (est.)	4,772		3.5%
U.S. Decennial Census; 2020 Census

As of the 2022 American Community Survey, there are 1,889 estimated households in Dilworth with an average of 2.4 persons per household. The city has a median household income of $84,602. Approximately 10.0% of the city's population lives at or below the poverty line. Dilworth has an estimated 74.2% employment rate, with 39.0% of the population holding a bachelor's degree or higher and 94.6% holding a high school diploma.

The top five reported ancestries (people were allowed to report up to two ancestries, thus the figures will generally add to more than 100%) were English (88.7), Spanish (3.1%), Other Indo-European (2.3%), Asian and Pacific Islander (0.8%), and Other (5.2%).

The median age in the city was 39.3 years.

=== Racial and ethnic composition ===
Dilworth, Minnesota – racial and ethnic composition Note: the US Census treats Hispanic/Latino as an ethnic category. This table excludes Latinos from the racial categories and assigns them to a separate category. Hispanics/Latinos may be of any race.
Race / ethnicity (NH = non-Hispanic)	Pop. 2000	Pop. 2010	Pop. 2020	% 2000	% 2010	% 2020
White alone (NH)	2,670	3,606	3,877	88.97%	89.61%	84.06%
Black or African American alone (NH)	1	18	156	0.03%	0.45%	3.38%
Native American or Alaska Native alone (NH)	47	79	69	1.57%	1.96%	1.50%
Asian alone (NH)	6	33	23	0.20%	0.82%	0.50%
Pacific Islander alone (NH)	0	0	0	0.00%	0.00%	0.00%
Other race alone (NH)	0	0	14	0.00%	0.00%	0.30%
Mixed race or multiracial (NH)	48	59	212	1.60%	1.47%	4.60%
Hispanic or Latino (any race)	229	229	261	7.63%	5.69%	5.66%
Total	3,001	4,024	4,612	100.00%	100.00%	100.00%

=== 2020 census ===
As of the 2020 census, there were 4,612 people, 1,828 households, and 1,213 families residing in the city. The population density was 1,436.8 inhabitants per square mile (554.8/km^{2}), and there were 1,942 housing units at an average density of 605.0 inhabitants per square mile (233.6/km^{2}).

The median age was 37.9 years. 27.3% of residents were under the age of 18, 2.3% were under 5 years of age, and 14.2% were 65 and older. For every 100 females, there were 98.1 males, and for every 100 females age 18 and over, there were 94.5 males age 18 and over.

97.9% of residents lived in urban areas, while 2.1% lived in rural areas.

There were 1,828 households, of which 33.9% had children under the age of 18 living in them. Of all households, 50.3% were married-couple households, 17.8% were households with a male householder and no spouse or partner present, and 24.5% were households with a female householder and no spouse or partner present. About 28.3% of all households were made up of individuals, and 12.2% had someone living alone who was 65 years of age or older.

Of the city's housing units, 5.9% were vacant. The homeowner vacancy rate was 1.4% and the rental vacancy rate was 6.6%.

=== 2010 census ===
As of the 2010 census, there were 4,024 people, 1,595 households, and 1,053 families living in the city. The population density was 1,215.7 inhabitants per square mile (469.4/km^{2}). There were 1,727 housing units at an average density of 521.8 inhabitants per square mile (201.5/km^{2}). The racial makeup was 93.29% White, 0.47% African American, 2.14% Native American, 0.84% Asian, 0.02% Pacific Islander, 1.19% from some other races and 2.03% from two or more races. Hispanic or Latino people of any race were 5.69% of the population.

There were 1,595 households, of which 36.2% had children under the age of 18 living with them, 51.0% were married couples living together, 10.2% had a female householder with no husband present, 4.8% had a male householder with no wife present, and 34.0% were non-families. 28.3% of all households were made up of individuals, and 9.4% had someone living alone who was 65 years of age or older. The average household size was 2.52 and the average family size was 3.11.

The median age in the city was 34.3 years. 28.7% of residents were under the age of 18; 7.8% were between the ages of 18 and 24; 27.7% were from 25 to 44; 24.2% were from 45 to 64; and 11.7% were 65 years of age or older. The gender makeup of the city was 50.0% male and 50.0% female.

=== 2000 census ===
As of the 2000 census, there were 3,001 people, 1,160 households, and 787 families living in the city. The population density was 1,510.6 inhabitants per square mile (583.2/km^{2}). There were 1,238 housing units at an average density of 623.2 inhabitants per square mile (240.6/km^{2}). The racial makeup of the city was 91.64% White, 0.03% African American, 1.80% Native American, 0.20% Asian, 0.00% Pacific Islander, 4.20% from some other races, and 2.13% from two or more races. Hispanic or Latino people of any race were 7.63% of the population.

There were 1,160 households, out of which 39.4% had children under the age of 18 living with them, 49.7% were married couples living together, 13.2% had a female householder with no husband present, and 32.1% were non-families. 27.1% of all households were made up of individuals, and 10.0% had someone living alone who was 65 years of age or older. The average household size was 2.59 and the average family size was 3.17.

In the city, the population was spread out, with 31.9% under the age of 18, 8.5% from 18 to 24, 30.0% from 25 to 44, 19.2% from 45 to 64, and 10.5% who were 65 years of age or older. The median age was 33 years. For every 100 females, there were 93.7 males. For every 100 females age 18 and over, there were 91.7 males.

The median income for a household in the city was $34,571, and the median income for a family was $42,887. Males had a median income of $32,857 versus $21,226 for females. The per capita income for the city was $14,726. About 13.7% of families and 16.1% of the population were below the poverty line, including 23.5% of those under age 18 and 5.6% of those age 65 or over.

== Economy ==
=== Employers ===
According to the City's 2022 Summary Budget

According to the City's 2010 Comprehensive Annual Financial Report, the employers in the city are:

#	Employer	Products/Services	# of Employees
1	Burlington Northern/Santa Fe Railroad	Rail Transportation	375
2	Walmart	Department store	225
3	Dilworth Public Schools	Elementary & Secondary Schools	95
4	FM Asphalt LLC.	Petroleum & Coal Products Manufacturing	85
5	Slumberland	Furniture store	30

== Transportation ==
Dilworth is connected to Moorhead and Fargo with the public transit provider MATBUS.

U.S. Route 10 (more commonly called Highway 10) serves as a main roadway in the city. Interstate 94 is nearby, connected to U.S. 10 by Minnesota State Highway 336.

Amtrak’s Empire Builder, which operates between Seattle/Portland and Chicago, passes through the town on BNSF tracks, but makes no stop. The nearest station is located in Fargo, 4 miles (6.4 km) to the west.

== Churches ==
Roman Catholic

- St. Elizabeth Catholic Church

Evangelical Lutheran in America

- Dilworth Lutheran Church

Presbyterian

- First Presbyterian Bible Church of Dilworth

Assemblies of God

- River Valley Church
