= KRFF-LP =

Community radio station in Moorhead, Minnesota

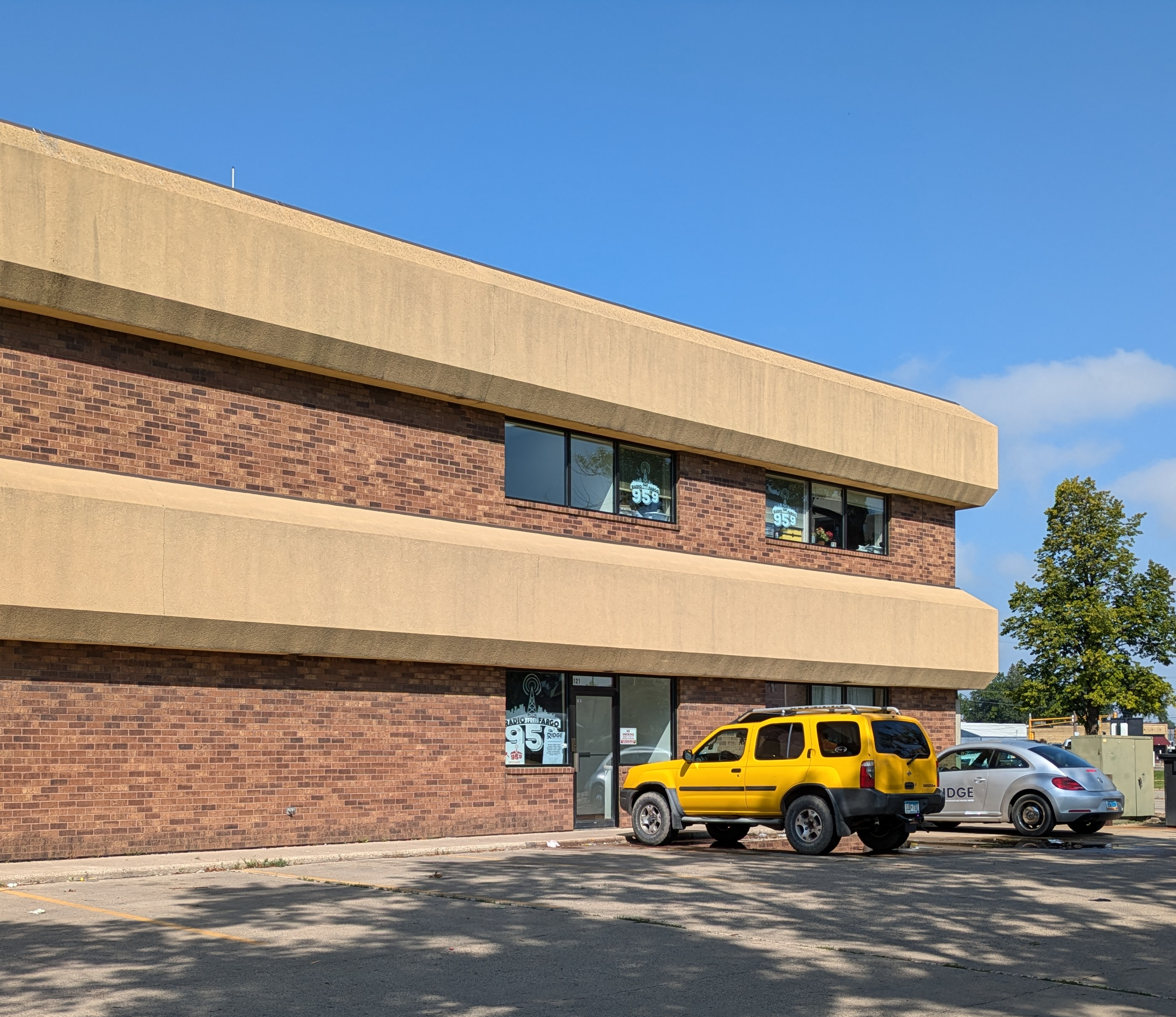
- Office in Fargo
- Moorhead, Minnesota; United States
- Broadcast area: Fargo–Moorhead
- Frequency: 95.9 (MHz)
- Branding: Radio Free Fargo

Programming
- Format: Freeform

Ownership
- Owner: Radio Free Fargo LLC

History
- First air date: January 1, 2010
- Former call signs: KXBQ-LP (2004–2015)
- Call sign meaning: Radio Free Fargo

Technical information
- Licensing authority: FCC
- Class: L1
- ERP: 50 watts
- HAAT: 42.4 meters
- Transmitter coordinates: 46°52′27.9″N 96°47′2.3″W

Links
- Public license information: LMS
- Website: http://www.radiofreefargo.org

KRFF-LP (95.9 FM) is a non-profit low power radio station broadcasting in Fargo, North Dakota (licensed to serve the community of Moorhead, Minnesota), airing a DJ Selected format.

== Station ownership ==
The station's Federal Communications Commission documentation lists Women's Care Clinic, Inc, as owner of KRFF-LP. Women's Care Clinic, a pro-life crisis pregnancy clinic, originally operated KXBQ-LP as a Contemporary Christian station managed by Martin Wishnatsky. Although the station has dropped the Christian music format on February 1, 2010 in favor for Alternative, it remained owned by the Women's Care Clinic until 2015.

In the summer of 2015, the station began to be operated by the group Radio Free Fargo with the call sign KRFF-LP. Radio Free Fargo previously shared ownership and operation of KNDS-LP in the same region. The station now features a variety of shows ranging from talk radio to electronic music, heavy metal, J-pop, noise music, and punk rock. The station's license was assigned to Radio Free Fargo LLC effective May 14, 2019.
