= Kindred, North Dakota =

- City
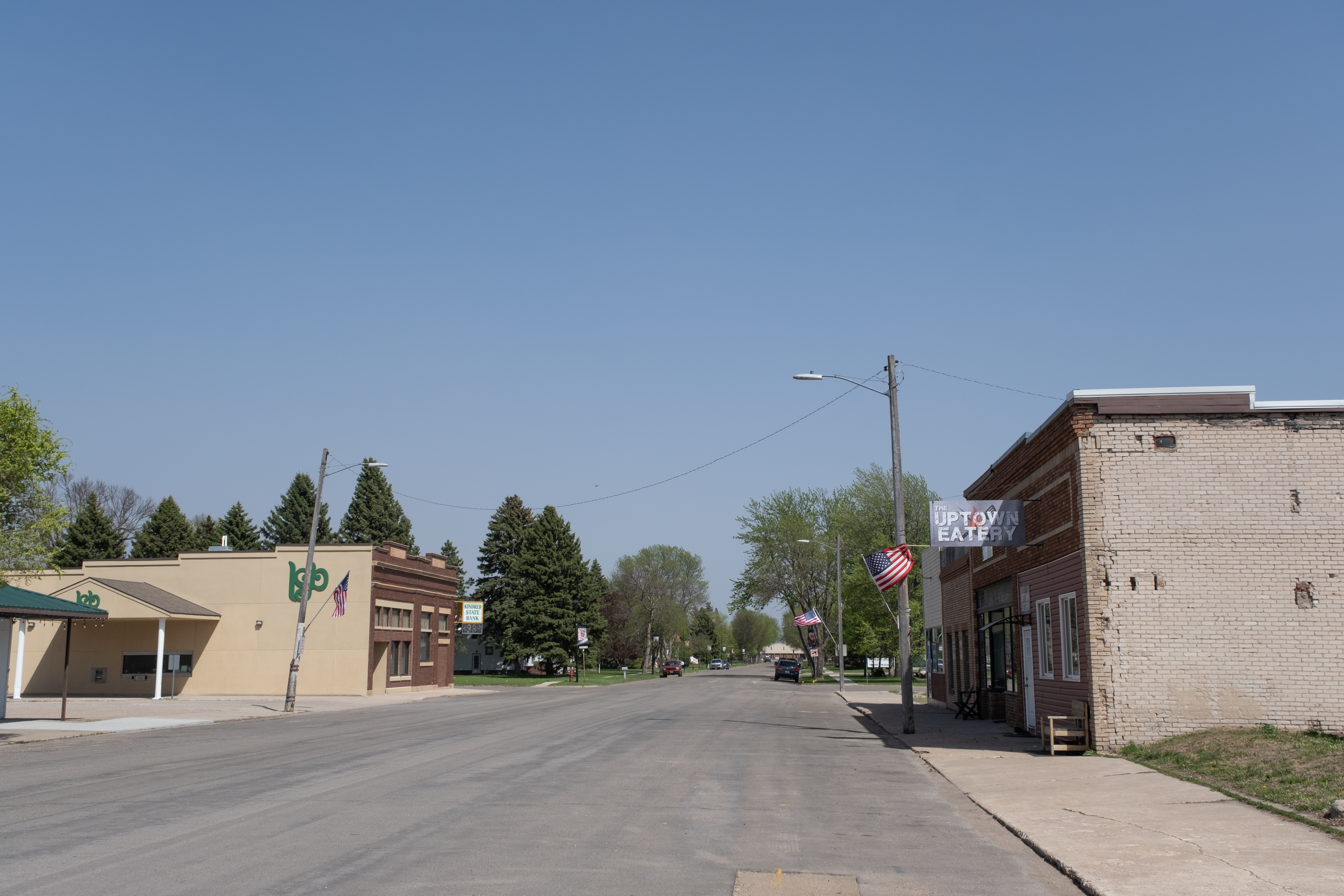
- Kindred in May 2025
- Motto: Where Kindness is a Way of Life
- Interactive map of Kindred, North Dakota
- Location within North Dakota
- Coordinates: 46.6495°N 97.0168°W
- Country: United States
- State: North Dakota
- County: Cass
- Metro: Fargo–Moorhead
- Founded: 1880
- Incorporated (village): March 10, 1920
- Incorporated (city): April 3, 1950
- Named for: William A. Kindred

Government
  - Type: Mayor–council
  - Mayor: Darrell Kersting
  - President: Adam Spelhaug
  - Vice president: Ozzie Peraza
  - Councilmen: Lydia Ronningen; Matt Sharp

Area
  - Total: 1.472 sq mi (3.812 km^{2})
  - Land: 1.472 sq mi (3.812 km^{2})
  - Water: 0 sq mi (0.000 km^{2}) 0.00%
- Elevation: 945 ft (288 m)

Population (2020)
  - Total: 889
  - Estimate (2025): 1,044
  - Density: 604/sq mi (233/km^{2})
- Time zone: UTC–6 (Central (CST))
  - Summer (DST): UTC–5 (CDT)
- ZIP Code: 58051
- Area code: 701
- FIPS code: 38-42780
- GNIS feature ID: 1036109
- Highways: CR 15, ND 46
- Website: kindrednd.com

Kindred is a city in Cass County, North Dakota, United States. The population was 889 as of the 2020 census, and was estimated to be 1,044 in 2025. Kindred primarily serves as a bedroom community for Fargo, which is located about 25 miles northeast.

== History ==
Kindred was platted in 1880 when the railroad was extended to that point. The city was named for William A. Kindred, a local businessman and afterward mayor of Fargo, North Dakota. A post office has been in operation at Kindred since 1881. Kindred was incorporated as a village on March 10, 1920 and as a city on April 3, 1950.

== Geography ==
According to the United States Census Bureau, the city has a total area of 1.472 square miles (3.81 km^{2}), all land.

== Demographics ==
Historical population
Census	Pop.	Note	%±
1920	334		—
1930	429		28.4%
1940	450		4.9%
1950	504		12.0%
1960	580		15.1%
1970	495		−14.7%
1980	568		14.7%
1990	569		0.2%
2000	614		7.9%
2010	692		12.7%
2020	889		28.5%
2025 (est.)	1,044		17.4%
U.S. Decennial Census; 2020 Census

According to realtor website Zillow, the average price of a home as of June 30, 2026, in Kindred was $417,123.

As of the 2024 American Community Survey, there were 345 estimated households in Kindred with an average of 2.89 persons per household. The city has a median household income of $105,104. Approximately 3.5% of the city's population lives at or below the poverty line. Kindred has an estimated 81.5% employment rate, with 44.2% of the population holding a bachelor's degree or higher and 99.5% holding a high school diploma. There were 362 housing units at an average density of 245.92 per square mile (95.0/km^{2}).

The top five reported languages (people were allowed to report up to two languages, thus the figures will generally add to more than 100%) were English (95.1%), Spanish (0.9%), Indo-European (4.1%), Asian and Pacific Islander (0.0%), and Other (0.0%).

The median age in the city was 33.0 years.

Kindred, North Dakota – racial and ethnic composition Note: the US Census treats Hispanic/Latino as an ethnic category. This table excludes Latinos from the racial categories and assigns them to a separate category. Hispanics/Latinos may be of any race.
Race / ethnicity (NH = non-Hispanic)	Pop. 2000	Pop. 2010	Pop. 2020	% 2000	% 2010	% 2020
White alone (NH)	603	662	845	98.21%	95.66%	95.05%
Black or African American alone (NH)	1	1	2	0.16%	0.14%	0.22%
Native American or Alaska Native alone (NH)	2	5	4	0.33%	0.72%	0.45%
Asian alone (NH)	1	0	0	0.16%	0.00%	0.00%
Pacific Islander alone (NH)	0	0	0	0.00%	0.00%	0.00%
Other race alone (NH)	0	0	0	0.00%	0.00%	0.00%
Mixed race or multiracial (NH)	1	14	19	0.16%	2.02%	2.14%
Hispanic or Latino (any race)	6	10	19	0.98%	1.45%	2.14%
Total	614	692	889	100.00%	100.00%	100.00%

=== 2020 census ===
As of the 2020 census, there were 889 people, 313 households, and 236 families residing in the city. The population density was 613.53 inhabitants per square mile (236.9/km^{2}). There were 339 housing units at an average density of 233.95 per square mile (90.3/km^{2}). The racial makeup of the city was 95.84% White, 0.22% African American, 0.45% Native American, 0.00% Asian, 0.00% Pacific Islander, 0.79% from some other races and 2.70% from two or more races. Hispanic or Latino people of any race were 2.14% of the population.

=== 2010 census ===
As of the 2010 census, there were 692 people, 267 households, and 185 families residing in the city. The population density was 477.90 inhabitants per square mile (184.5/km^{2}). There were 289 housing units at an average density of 199.59 per square mile (77.1/km^{2}). The racial makeup of the city was 95.95% White, 0.14% African American, 0.72% Native American, 0.00% Asian, 0.00% Pacific Islander, 1.16% from some other races and 2.02% from two or more races. Hispanic or Latino people of any race were 1.45% of the population.

There were 267 households, of which 44.6% had children under the age of 18 living with them, 56.2% were married couples living together, 8.6% had a female householder with no husband present, 4.5% had a male householder with no wife present, and 30.7% were non-families. 24.0% of all households were made up of individuals, and 6% had someone living alone who was 65 years of age or older. The average household size was 2.59 and the average family size was 3.16.

The median age in the city was 32.5 years. 33.1% of residents were under the age of 18; 5.4% were between the ages of 18 and 24; 30.9% were from 25 to 44; 20.8% were from 45 to 64; and 9.7% were 65 years of age or older. The gender makeup of the city was 50.3% male and 49.7% female.

=== 2000 census ===
As of the 2000 census, there were 614 people, 248 households, and 167 families residing in the city. The population density was 615.27 inhabitants per square mile (237.6/km^{2}). There were 267 housing units at an average density of 267.55 per square mile (103.3/km^{2}). The racial makeup of the city was 98.37% White, 0.16% African American, 0.33% Native American, 0.16% Asian, 0.00% Pacific Islander, 0.00% from some other races and 0.98% from two or more races. Hispanic or Latino people of any race were 0.98% of the population.

There were 248 households, out of which 38.3% had children under the age of 18 living with them, 56.9% were married couples living together, 6.5% had a female householder with no husband present, and 32.3% were non-families. 28.2% of all households were made up of individuals, and 12.5% had someone living alone who was 65 years of age or older. The average household size was 2.48 and the average family size was 3.06.

In the city, the population was spread out, with 30.8% under the age of 18, 5.2% from 18 to 24, 35.0% from 25 to 44, 15.5% from 45 to 64, and 13.5% who were 65 years of age or older. The median age was 34 years. For every 100 females, there were 93.1 males. For every 100 females age 18 and over, there were 93.2 males.

The median income for a household in the city was $43,250, and the median income for a family was $49,091. Males had a median income of $31,607 versus $22,167 for females. The per capita income for the city was $18,314. About 4.6% of families and 6.2% of the population were below the poverty line, including 7.7% of those under age 18 and 8.8% of those age 65 or over.

== Education ==
The Kindred Public School District 2 was organized in 1875. The 2022–2023 School Year enrollment for K-12 was 879 students (482 Elementary and 397 Secondary students).

It is one of the largest rural schools in Cass County. As of the 2023–2024 school year, Kindred Public School has an enrollment of 517 students in grades PK-6 at Kindred Elementary School and 246 students in grades 7-12 at Kindred Secondary School. This comes to an overall total of 916 students for the 2023–2024 school year.

The area is served by the Kindred Public School District 2. It operates the Kindred School. In the 2025-26 academic year, the district reported a total of 923 students.

The Kindred Public Library in November of 2026

The City of Kindred features a public library. The library was established in the year 2002 and relies on a combination of municipal funding, grants, and volunteer support. Since its opening in 2002, the library has provided print media, public WIFI access, and genealogical records for the local community.

=== Race/Ethnicity ===
In 2024–2025, School District's enrollment number is 896. In detail, out of the 896 students, 96.0% were White, 1.2% were Black/African American, 1.5% were American Indian/Alaska Natives, 0.1% were Asian, 0.1% were Native Hawaiian/Other Pacific Islander, 0.1% were Two or More Races, 1.0% were Hispanic or Latino of any race(s).

== Notable people ==
- Kevin Cramer, U.S. senator from North Dakota
- Anna Palmer, journalist
