= Sabin, Minnesota =

City in Minnesota, United States

Sabin
- City
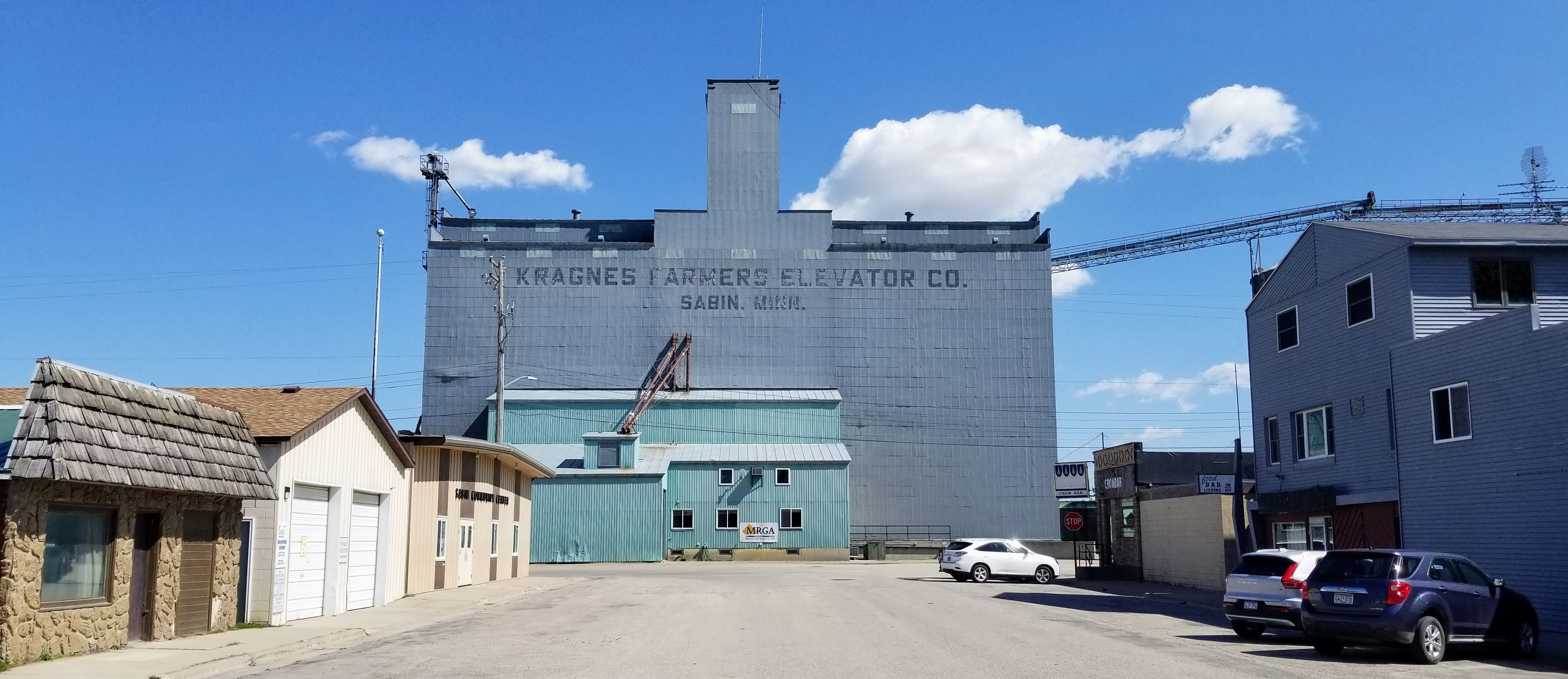
- Buildings on Sabin's Main Street (2021)

- Motto: "Welcome To The City Of Sabin"
- Location of Sabin, Minnesota
- Coordinates: 46°46′53″N 96°39′15″W
- Country: United States
- State: Minnesota
- County: Clay
- Founded: 1875

Area
  - Total: 0.46 sq mi (1.18 km^{2})
  - Land: 0.46 sq mi (1.18 km^{2})
  - Water: 0 sq mi (0.00 km^{2})
- Elevation: 929 ft (283 m)

Population (2020)
  - Total: 619
  - Estimate (2021): 615
  - Density: 1,364.4/sq mi (526.79/km^{2})
- Time zone: UTC-6 (CST)
  - Summer (DST): UTC-5 (CDT)
- ZIP code: 56580
- Area code: 218
- FIPS code: 27-56554
- GNIS feature ID: 2396464
- Website: cityofsabin.com

Sabin is a city in Clay County, Minnesota, United States about 14 miles southeast of Moorhead. The population was 619 at the 2020 census.

== History ==
The city was named for Dwight M. Sabin, a United States Senator from Minnesota. A post office in Sabin has been in operation since 1881. Every year the city holds "Sabin Harvest Days", with events for both kids and adults.

=== Scheels ===
Frederick A. Scheele opened the first Scheels in Sabin as a hardware store. Scheels is now led by the fifth generation of the Scheel family and has grown to be a destination-style sporting goods store with locations throughout the United States.

== Geography ==
Sabin is mostly south of U.S. Route 52 and the shortline railway owned by Otter Tail Valley Railroad that runs parallel to Route 52. According to the United States Census Bureau, Sabin has an area of 0.35 square miles (0.91 km^{2}), all land. The elevation is approximately 929 feet.

== Demographics ==
Historical population
Census	Pop.	Note	%±
1930	197		—
1940	210		6.6%
1950	211		0.5%
1960	251		19.0%
1970	333		32.7%
1980	446		33.9%
1990	495		11.0%
2000	421		−14.9%
2010	522		24.0%
2020	619		18.6%
2021 (est.)	615		−0.6%
U.S. Decennial Census; 2020 Census

=== 2010 census ===
As of the census of 2010, there were 522 people, 180 households, and 140 families living in the city. The population density was 1,491.4 inhabitants per square mile (575.8/km^{2}). There were 187 housing units at an average density of 534.3 per square mile (206.3/km^{2}). The racial makeup of the city was 97.7% White, 0.2% Native American, 1.1% from other races, and 1.0% from two or more races. Hispanic or Latino of any race were 2.5% of the population.

There were 180 households, of which 46.1% had children under the age of 18 living with them, 67.2% were married couples living together, 5.6% had a female householder with no husband present, 5.0% had a male householder with no wife present, and 22.2% were non-families. 17.2% of all households were made up of individuals, and 3.4% had someone living alone who was 65 years of age or older. The average household size was 2.90 and the average family size was 3.32.

The median age in the city was 31.2 years. 32.6% of residents were under the age of 18; 8.2% were between the ages of 18 and 24; 32.6% were from 25 to 44; 22.1% were from 45 to 64; and 4.4% were 65 years of age or older. The gender makeup of the city was 51.9% male and 48.1% female.

=== 2000 census ===
As of the census of 2000, there were 421 people, 152 households, and 117 families living in the city. The population density was 1,390.5 inhabitants per square mile (536.9/km^{2}). There were 158 housing units at an average density of 521.9 per square mile (201.5/km^{2}). The racial makeup of the city was 98.10% White, 0.24% African American, 0.48% Native American, 0.24% Asian, 0.71% from other races, and 0.24% from two or more races. Hispanic or Latino of any race were 0.95% of the population.

There were 152 households, out of which 46.1% had children under the age of 18 living with them, 69.1% were married couples living together, 5.9% had a female householder with no husband present, and 22.4% were non-families. 15.8% of all households were made up of individuals, and 3.9% had someone living alone who was 65 years of age or older. The average household size was 2.77 and the average family size was 3.15.

In the city, the population was spread out, with 29.2% under the age of 18, 7.1% from 18 to 24, 38.0% from 25 to 44, 18.8% from 45 to 64, and 6.9% who were 65 years of age or older. The median age was 32 years. For every 100 females, there were 106.4 males. For every 100 females age 18 and over, there were 112.9 males.

The median income for a household in the city was $43,523, and the median income for a family was $51,250. Males had a median income of $31,838 versus $19,886 for females. The per capita income for the city was $15,776. About 2.7% of families and 6.4% of the population were below the poverty line, including 4.7% of those under age 18 and none of those age 65 or over.
