= KQWB-FM =

- Breckenridge, Minnesota; United States
- Broadcast area: Fargo-Moorhead
- Frequency: 105.1 MHz
- Branding: Q105.1

Programming
- Format: Active rock
- Affiliations: United Stations Radio Networks

Ownership
- Owner: Radio FM Media; (Radio Fargo-Moorhead, Inc.)
- Sister stations: K233CY, KBVB, KPFX, KLTA-FM, KQWB, KBMW

History
- First air date: December 3, 1966
- Former frequencies: 98.7 MHz (1966–2013)
- Call sign meaning: Inherited from KQWB-AM, formerly co-owned with KDWB

Technical information
- Licensing authority: FCC
- Facility ID: 64359
- Class: C1
- ERP: 100,000 watts
- HAAT: 201 meters (659 ft)
- Transmitter coordinates: 46.760°N 96.608°W
- Repeater: 107.9 KPFX-HD2 (Kindred)

Links
- Public license information: Public file; LMS
- Webcast: Listen live
- Website: q1051rocks.com

KQWB-FM (105.1 MHz, "Q105.1") is an active rock radio station located in Fargo, North Dakota (licensed by the Federal Communications Commission (FCC) to Breckenridge, Minnesota), owned by Jim Ingstad's Radio FM Media.

Its studios are located on 7th Avenue South, while its transmitter is located east of Wolverton.

From 1968–2013, KQWB-FM was on 98.7 MHz, but moved to 105.1 MHz on August 16, 2013.

== History ==
=== First four decades on 98.7 ===
Q98 logo from the 1990s

98.7 FM first went on the air on December 3, 1966, as KQWB-FM (inheriting call letters from KQWB), after Midwest Radio Company received a construction permit for a new FM station with transmitter facilities north of Glyndon, Minnesota. In 1981, the station's transmitter was moved to the old KXGO-TV/KEND-TV (now KVLY-TV) tower south of Sabin, MN.

While being a rock station for nearly all of its existence, Q98 was more specifically an active rock station since the early 1990s, with its roots in album oriented rock (AOR). For most of the last decade, KQWB-FM has had a syndicated morning show. In 1998, Scotch & Daniels was replaced with Bob and Tom in the morning. In 2000, Bob and Tom was dropped, and Scotch was brought back with Dui. They remained as morning show hosts until 2003, when they were replaced with another syndicated duo, Lex and Terry.

For many years, KQWB-FM aired the Alternative Feed on Sunday evenings. This show featured music from lesser known alternative bands and music from up and coming mainstream artists. This show ended in July 2012. This show was replaced (indirectly) with Metal Imperium, a three-hour show on Saturday evenings featuring Gunner and Chow, airing the newest and heaviest metal in the KQWB library. This show was disconnected in 2015.

=== Frequency swap with 98.7 ===
Q98 Logo before moving to 105.1 in 2013

On August 9, 2013, KQWB-FM announced they would be moving from 98.7 MHz to 105.1 MHz, replacing sister station KLTA. The station re-branded as Q105.1, and brought the active rock format and personalities with them from 98.7. Q98 dedicated their whole last day to their listeners as they played nearly everything that was requested. They took requests from the phone lines, Twitter, and Facebook. At Midnight on the 16th, the station began a temporary simulcast with 105.1 that ran until 5pm that evening. Q98's official last song was "Revolution is My Name" by Pantera, which was played before the start of the simulcast. After a quick pause on both stations so they could catch up with each other, the simulcast kicked off with "I'll Stick Around" by The Foo Fighters.

At 5:00pm that evening in the middle of "In the End" by Black Veil Brides, the music and simulcast faded on 98.7 and stunting for 98.7's new format began. At that point, 98.7 began identifying as KLTA, effectively completing a call sign swap with KQWB. 98.7 debuted with a Hot AC/Top 40 (CHR) hybrid format as "Big 98.7" on August 19, directly competing against long running Top 40 outlet KOYY-FM "Y94".

=== Ownership ===
In May 1999, Triad Broadcasting reached a deal to acquire this station (along with KQWB, KVOX-FM, KLTA (who was then on 105.1), and KPFX from brothers Jim and Tom Ingstad as part of a twelve-station deal valued at a reported $37.8 million.

On November 30, 2012, Triad Broadcasting signed a Definitive Agreement to sell all 32 of their stations to Larry Wilson's L&L Broadcasting for $21 Million. Upon completion of the sale on May 1, 2013, L&L in turn sold the Fargo stations to Jim Ingstad, who had just sold his competing cluster to Midwest Communications. An LMA (Local Marketing Agreement) was placed so Ingstad could take immediate control of the stations, and the sale became final July 2, 2013. The sale was worth $9.5 million.
