= KBMW (AM) =

Coordinates: 46°16′41″N 96°35′19″W

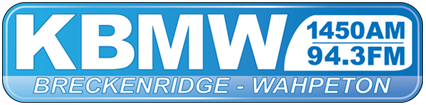
- Breckenridge, Minnesota; United States
- Broadcast area: Wahpeton-Breckenridge
- Frequency: 1450 kHz
- Branding: AM 1450 KBMW

Programming
- Format: Country
- Affiliations: Fox News Radio; Minnesota News Network; Minnesota Twins

Ownership
- Owner: Robert J. Ingstad; (I3G Media, LLC)
- Sister stations: KBMW-FM

History
- First air date: 1948
- Call sign meaning: K Breckenridge, Minnesota and Wahpeton

Technical information
- Licensing authority: FCC
- Facility ID: 70500
- Class: C
- Power: 1,000 watts
- Translator: 94.3 K232FH (Breckenridge)

Links
- Public license information: Public file; LMS
- Webcast: Listen Live
- Website: kbmwam.com

KBMW (1450 kHz) is an AM radio station licensed to Breckenridge, Minnesota, serving the Wahpeton-Breckenridge area, owned by Robert Ingstad's I3G Media, LLC. The station airs a mix of country music and news, as well local content such as community calendar, funeral notices, and Swap Shop. It carries Minnesota Twins baseball coverage, updates from the American Ag Network, and plays a variety of syndicated programming at night.

== History ==
KBMW first signed on the air in August, 1948. The call sign is said to derive from a combination of its two primary service areas: K Breckenridge, Minnesota, and Wahpeton, North Dakota.

On March 31, 2003, the station was purchased by W-B Broadcasting for $1.2 million.

The station was acquired by I3G Media, LLC (owned by Robert Ingstad) for $925,000 on December 31, 2017. Prior to this, Triad Broadcasting sold KBMW to L&L Broadcasting in 2012.

On November 30, 2012, Triad Broadcasting signed a Definitive Agreement to sell all 32 of their stations to Larry Wilson's L&L Broadcasting for $21 Million. Upon completion of the sale on May 1, 2013, L&L in turn sold the Fargo stations to Jim Ingstad, who had just sold his competing cluster to Midwest Communications. An LMA (Local Marketing Agreement) was placed so Ingstad could take immediate control of the stations, and the sale became final July 2, 2013. The sale was worth $9.5 million.

Jim Ingstad sold KBMW to daughter Brooke Ingstad's Radio Wahpeton Breckenridge, LLC effective June 1, 2016; the purchase price was $300,000. Brooke Ingstad sold KBMW and sister station KBMW-FM to cousin Robert Ingstad's I3G Media, LLC effective December 31, 2017 for $925,000.
