= Fargo–Moorhead metropolitan area =

Metropolitan area in North Dakota and Minnesota

Coordinates: 46°51′N 96°47′W

- Metropolitan statistical area
- Fargo, ND–MN Metropolitan Statistical Area
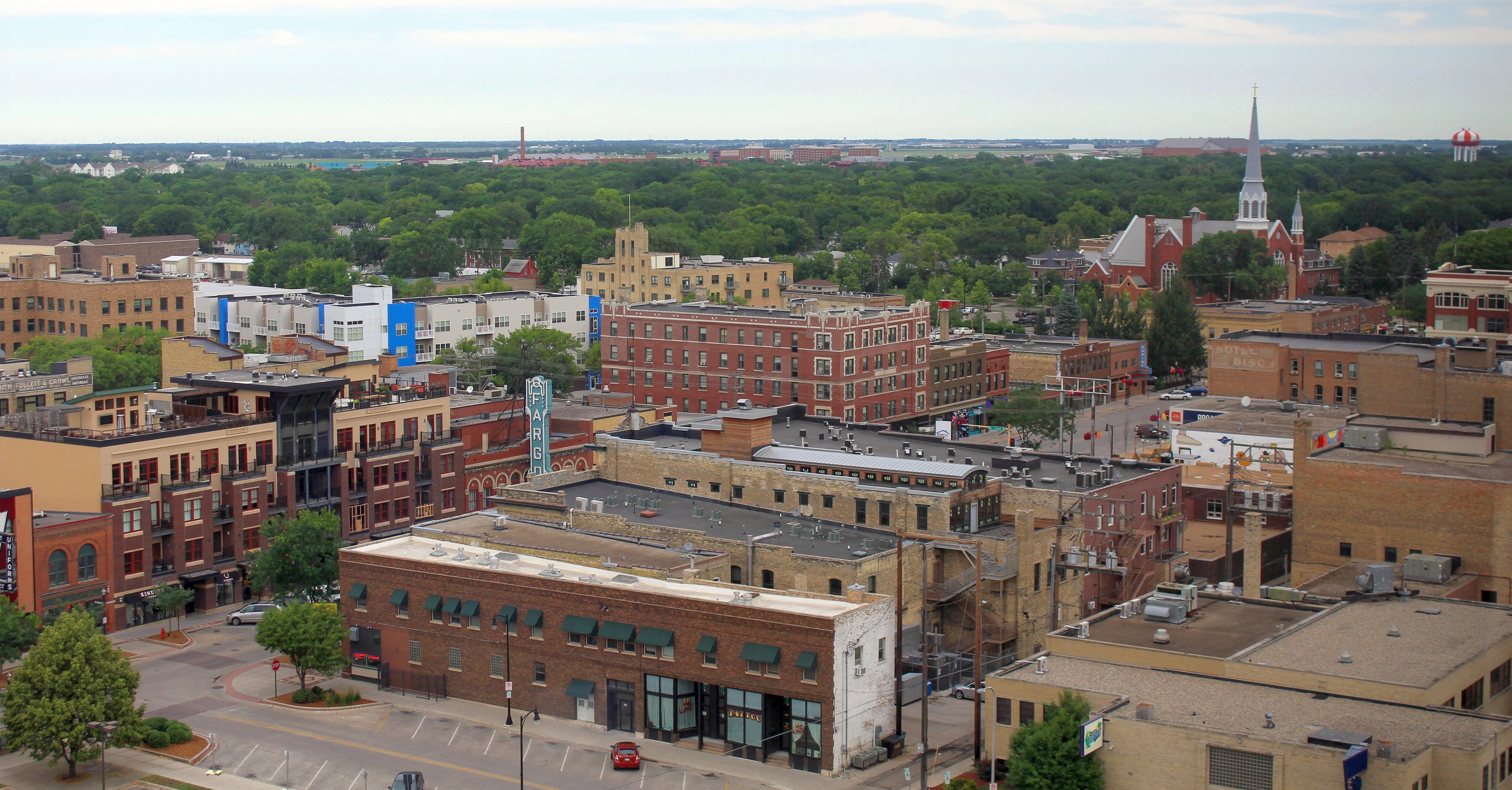
- Downtown Fargo
Interactive Map of Fargo–Wahpeton, ND–MN CSA
City of Fargo
City of Moorhead
Fargo, ND–MN MSA
City of Wahpeton
Wahpeton, ND–MN μSA
- Country: United States
- State: North Dakota; Minnesota
- Largest city: Fargo, ND
- Other cities: Moorhead, MN; West Fargo, ND; Dilworth, MN; Wahpeton, ND; Breckenridge, MN

Area
  - Total: 2,810.052 sq mi (7,278.00 km^{2})
- Highest elevation: 928 ft (283 m)
- Lowest elevation: 892 ft (272 m)

Population (2020)
  - Total: 249,843 (Metro); 272,878 (Combined)
  - Estimate (2024): 267,793 (Metro); 290,719 (Combined)
  - Rank: Metro: 187th in the U.S. Combined: 120th in the U.S.
  - Density: 95.3/sq mi (36.79/km^{2})

GDP
  - Total: $20.536 billion (2023)
- Time zone: UTC–6 (CST)
  - Summer (DST): UTC–5 (CDT)
- Area codes: 218 and 701
- Website: fargomoorhead.org

The Fargo–Moorhead metropolitan area, also known as the FM area, is a common name given to the metropolitan area comprising Fargo, North Dakota; Moorhead, Minnesota; and the surrounding communities. These two cities lie on the North Dakota–Minnesota border, on opposite banks of the Red River of the North. The region is the cultural, retail, health care, educational, and industrial center of southeastern North Dakota and northwestern Minnesota.

The Fargo–Moorhead area is defined by the Census Bureau as comprising all of Cass County, North Dakota and Clay County, Minnesota, which includes the cities of West Fargo, North Dakota, Dilworth, Minnesota, and numerous other towns and developments from which commuters travel daily for work, education, and regular activities. A July 1, 2024 census estimate placed the population at 267,793, an increase of 7.2% from the 2020 census, an increase of 28.3% from the 2010 census, and an increase of 53.6% from the 2000 census.

== Communities ==
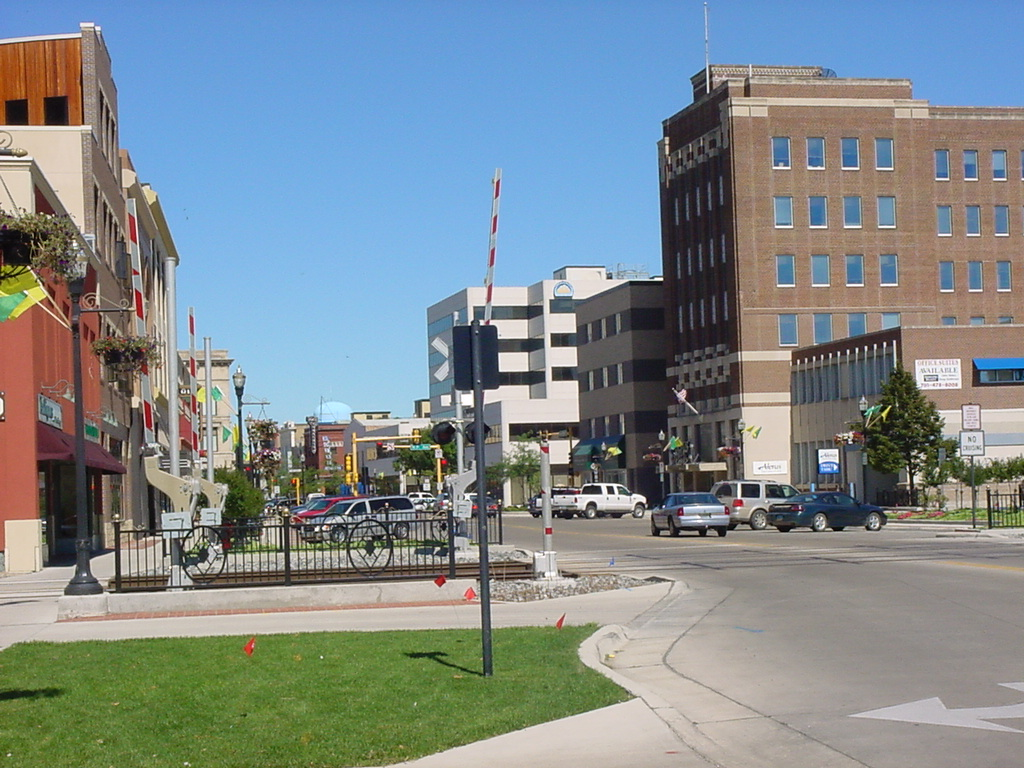
The city of Fargo, North Dakota is the most populous city in the FM area

=== Core cities ===
- Fargo, North Dakota
- Moorhead, Minnesota
- West Fargo, North Dakota
- Dilworth, Minnesota
- Horace, North Dakota

=== Suburbs/Adjacent towns ===
- Briarwood, North Dakota
- Frontier, North Dakota
- Harwood, North Dakota
- North River, North Dakota
- Prairie Rose, North Dakota
- Reile's Acres, North Dakota

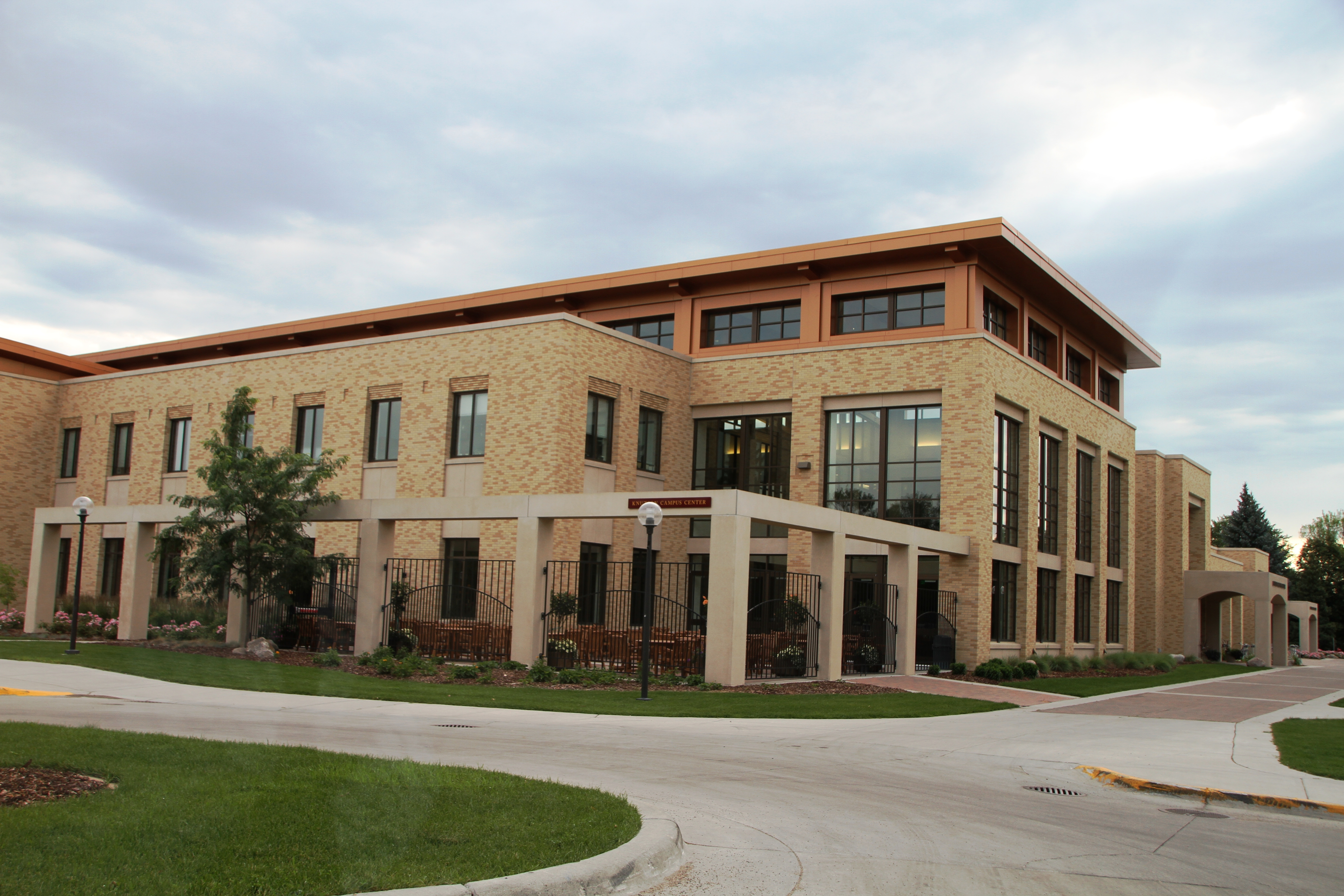
Concordia College in Moorhead, Minnesota is a noted academic institution in the region

=== Bedroom communities ===
- Barnesville, Minnesota
- Sabin, Minnesota
- Downer, Minnesota
- Mapleton, North Dakota
- Casselton, North Dakota
- Davenport, North Dakota
- Durbin, North Dakota
- Glyndon, Minnesota
- Hawley, Minnesota
- Hickson, North Dakota
- Kindred, North Dakota
- Leonard, North Dakota
- Oxbow, North Dakota
- Walcott, North Dakota

== Demographics ==
Historical population
Census	Pop.	Note	%±
1860	72		—
1870	92		27.8%
1880	14,885		16,079.3%
1890	31,130		109.1%
1900	46,567		49.6%
1910	53,575		15.0%
1920	63,257		18.1%
1930	71,855		13.6%
1940	78,186		8.8%
1950	89,240		14.1%
1960	106,027		18.8%
1970	120,238		13.4%
1980	137,574		14.4%
1990	153,296		11.4%
2000	174,367		13.7%
2010	208,777		19.7%
2020	249,843		19.7%
2024 (est.)	267,793		7.2%
U.S. Decennial Census; 1790–1960 1900–1990; 1990–2000 2010–2020

=== Population by decade ===
County	State	Seat	2025 estimate	2020 census	Change	Area	Density
Cass	North Dakota	Fargo	201,794	184,525	+9.36%	1,768 sq mi (4,579 km^{2})	114/sq mi (44/km^{2})
Clay	Minnesota	Moorhead	67,734	65,318	+3.70%	1,053 sq mi (2,727 km^{2})	64/sq mi (25/km^{2})
Total			269,528	249,843	+7.88%	2,821 sq mi (7,306 km^{2})	96/sq mi (37/km^{2})

=== Age ===
According to the American Community Survey, the age distribution was as follows:

- Under 5 years: 6.8%
- 5–9 years: 6.1%
- 10–14 years: 5.9%
- 15–19 years: 8.0%
- 20–24 years: 11.9%
- 25–34 years: 16.0%
- 35–44 years: 12.8%
- 45–54 years: 13.2%
- 55–59 years: 5.1%
- 60–64 years: 3.7%
- 65–74 years: 4.9%
- 75–84 years: 3.7%
- 85 years and over: 1.8%
- Median age: 31.6 years

=== Race ===
According to the same survey, the racial composition was as follows:

- White: 93.3% (Non-Hispanic Whites: 92.0%)
- Black or African American: 1.6%
- American Indian: 1.4%
- Asian: 1.4%
- Native Hawaiian and Other Pacific Islander: 0.1%
- Some other race: 0.8%
- Two or more races: 1.4%
- Hispanic or Latino (of any race): 2.5%

There were 3,032 African Americans, who made up 1.6% of the population.

The Asian American population is not dominated by a single ancestry group and is fairly diverse. The largest Asian American group are those of Chinese descent, who number at 928 and make up 0.5% of the population. Other sizable groups include Indians, Vietnamese, and Koreans, who number at 393, 379, and 360 respectively; all three groups comprise roughly 0.2% of the population. There are 134 Filipinos, making up roughly 0.1% of the population. People of Japanese descent were very few, with only 40 people identifying themselves as Japanese; they make up a mere 0.02% of the population.

Pacific Islander Americans numbered at 119 and made up approximately 0.06% of the population.

Multiracial Americans make up 1.4% of the metro area's population. Those of white and Native American ancestry made up 0.5% of the population, and numbered at 938. People of white and Asian ancestry numbered at 557, and those of white and black ancestry numbered at 571. Both groupings made up roughly 0.3% of the population. Approximately 72 people identified themselves as black and Native American.

Hispanics and Latinos are the largest minority group in Fargo–Moorhead. Hispanics and Latinos make up 2.5% of the population, of which 2.0% are of Mexican descent. Of the 4,786 Hispanics, 3,846 are Mexican. There were 196 Puerto Ricans and 136 Cubans; both of these groups made up roughly 0.1% of the population. In addition, 608 individuals identified themselves with other Hispanic or Latino groups other than Mexican, Puerto Rican, and Cuban, making up 0.3% of the population.

The Native American population is predominantly Ojibwe, with a Sioux minority. Of the 2,679 Native Americans, 1,447 are of the Chippewa tribal grouping. The Chippewa alone make up 0.8% of the population. The 444 Sioux make up 0.2% of the population. In addition, 20 people identified themselves as a member of the Cherokee tribal grouping.

NOTE: The source above contains all of the information on population, age, and race.

=== Ancestry ===
The European American population is overwhelmingly German and Scandinavian. Most of the Scandinavian population is of Norwegian descent. Smaller Euro-American groups include those of English, Irish, and French descent.

As of the 2006–2008 American Community Survey, the top ten largest European ancestry groups were the following:

- German: 42.9% (82,398)
- Norwegian: 36.4% (69,964)
- Irish: 8.6% (16,589)
- Swedish: 6.6% (12,641)
- English: 4.8% (9,286)
- French: 4.3% (8,283)
- Polish: 3.2% (6,180)
- Russian: 2.0% (3,783)
- Czech: 1.6% (3,047)
- Scottish: 1.5% (2,871)

=== Language spoken at home ===
- Population 5 years and over: 179,175
- English only: 93.6% (167,729)
- Language other than English: 6.4% (11,446)
- Spanish: 2.1% (3,771)
- Other Indo-European languages: 2.5% (4,393)
- Asian and Pacific Islander languages: 0.9% (1,659)
- Other languages: 0.9% (1,623)

NOTE: The source above contains all of the information on ancestry and language.

== Politics ==
Presidential election results
Year	Democratic	Republican	Others
2024	45.6% 56,425	51.6% 63,868	2.8% 3,462
2020	47.9% 56,668	48.7% 57,662	3.3% 3,962
2016	40.2% 44,332	48.4% 53,359	11.4% 12,528
2012	48.6% 49,920	48.4% 49,775	3.0% 3,046
2008	53.7% 54,288	44.1% 44,544	2.2% 2,261
2004	41.3% 38,999	57.2% 53,984	1.6% 1,465
2000	38.3% 31,579	54.9% 45,248	6.7% 5,526
1996	44.8% 32,169	46.0% 33,002	9.2% 6,619
1992	36.5% 27,922	45.7% 34,978	17.9% 13,694
1988	47.0% 33,293	52.3% 37,079	0.7% 470
1984	40.7% 28,348	58.6% 40,786	0.7% 473
1980	34.0% 22,502	51.9% 34,333	14.1% 9,293
1976	45.6% 28,755	52.1% 32,900	2.3% 1,464
1972	40.8% 23,149	57.9% 32,859	1.2% 698
1968	42.9% 18,806	52.8% 23,150	4.3% 1,875
1964	57.5% 25,835	42.4% 19,057	0.1% 62
1960	43.0% 19,454	57.0% 25,776	0.1% 25

The Fargo–Moorhead area has generally leaned Republican, voting for that party's presidential candidate in every election between 1968 and 2004. While Clay County is a swing county which has voted for Democrats 9 times and Republicans 7 times since 1960, Cass County has only voted Democratic twice: for Lyndon B. Johnson in 1964 and Barack Obama in 2008.

In recent years, however, Fargo–Moorhead has become very competitive. In 2008, it voted for Obama by a nearly-10-point margin, followed by just 0.2% in 2012. In 2016, it flipped Republican once again, voting for Donald Trump by 8 points, and it voted for Trump again in 2020, albeit by a narrow margin of less than a percentage point.

== Fargo/Wahpeton CSA ==
The Census Bureau also tracks a Fargo–Wahpeton Combined Statistical Area, consisting of Cass and Clay counties, as well as the Wahpeton micropolitan area of Richland County, North Dakota and Wilkin County, Minnesota. This area includes the twin cities of Wahpeton, North Dakota and Breckenridge, Minnesota.

The Fargo–Moorhead urban core is actually about forty-five minutes of highway travel from the Wahpeton–Breckenridge core. The main connection between these two pairs of cities is the Red River Valley, the flat, fertile land that both depend upon for a major part of their economies. Potatoes and sugar beets are important crops in the region, in addition to most of the other crops produced elsewhere in Minnesota and North Dakota.

Statistical Area	2025 estimate	2020 Census	Change	Area	Density
Fargo, ND–MN Metropolitan Statistical Area	269,528	249,843	+7.88%	2,821 sq mi (7,306 km^{2})	96/sq mi (37/km^{2})
Wahpeton, ND–MN Micropolitan Statistical Area	23,019	23,035	−0.07%	2,196 sq mi (5,688 km^{2})	10/sq mi (4/km^{2})
Total	292,547	272,878	+7.21%	5,017 sq mi (12,994 km^{2})	58/sq mi (23/km^{2})

== See also ==
- Fargo-Moorhead media
- North Dakota statistical areas
