= List of radio stations in North Dakota =

The following is a list of FCC-licensed radio stations in the U.S. state of North Dakota, which can be sorted by their call signs, frequencies, cities of license, licensees, and programming formats.

== List of radio stations ==
Call sign	Frequency	City of License	Licensee	Format
KABU	90.7 FM	Fort Totten	Dakota Circle Tipi, Inc.	Educational
KACL	98.7 FM	Bismarck	Townsquare License, LLC	Classic hits
KAOC	105.1 FM	Cavalier	Simmons Broadcasting	Country
KAUJ	100.9 FM	Grafton	Simmons Broadcasting	Unknown
KBEP-LP	93.7 FM	Bismarck	Bismarck Educational Prayer Association	Christian
KBMK	88.3 FM	Bismarck	Educational Media Foundation	Contemporary Christian (K-Love)
KBMR	1130 AM	Bismarck	iHM Licenses, LLC	Classic country
KBTO	101.9 FM	Bottineau	Programmers Broadcasting	Country
KBYZ	96.5 FM	Bismarck	Townsquare License, LLC	Classic rock
KCAD	99.1 FM	Dickinson	iHM Licenses, LLC	Country
KCBJ	90.7 FM	Jamestown	Fargo Baptist Church	
KCJB	910 AM	Minot	iHM Licenses, LLC	Classic country
KCND	90.5 FM	Bismarck	Prairie Public Broadcasting, Inc.	Public radio
KDAK	1600 AM	Carrington	Two Rivers Broadcasting	Classic hits
KDDR	1220 AM	Oakes	I3G Media, Inc.	Country
KDIX	1230 AM	Dickinson	Starrdak, Inc.	Classic hits
KDKT	1410 AM	Beulah	Digital Syndicate Network	Sports (ISN)
KDLR	1240 AM	Devils Lake	Double Z Broadcasting	Classic country
KDPR	89.9 FM	Dickinson	Prairie Public Broadcasting, Inc.	Public radio
KDSR	101.1 FM	Williston	Williston Community Broadcasting Corp. d/b/a KDSR(FM)	Variety hits
KDSU	91.9 FM	Fargo	North Dakota State University	Public radio
KDVI	89.9 FM	Devils Lake	American Family Association	Inspirational (AFR)
KDVL	102.5 FM	Devils Lake	Double Z Broadcasting	Classic hits
KDXN	105.7 FM	South Heart	GlassWorks Broadcasting, LLC	Adult contemporary
KEGK	106.9 FM	Wahpeton	Radio Wahpeton Breckenridge, LLC	Classic hits
KEQQ-LP	88.3 FM	Grand Forks	Grand Forks Bible Study Group	Educational talk
KEYA	88.5 FM	Belcourt	KEYA, Inc.	Country
KEYZ	660 AM	Williston	Townsquare License, LLC	News Talk Information
KFAA	89.5 FM	Horace	Educational Media Foundation	Contemporary worship (Air1)
KFBN	88.7 FM	Fargo	Fargo Baptist Church	Religious
KFGO	790 AM	Fargo	Midwest Communications, Inc.	News Talk Information
KFGO-FM	104.7 FM	Hope	Midwest Communications, Inc.	News Talk Information
KFJM	90.7 FM	Grand Forks	Prairie Public Broadcasting, Inc.	Adult album alternative
KFLK	88.1 FM	Minot	Calvary Chapel Minot	Religious Teaching
KFNW	1200 AM	West Fargo	Northwestern College	Religious
KFNW-FM	97.9 FM	Fargo	Northwestern College	Contemporary Christian
KFYR	550 AM	Bismarck	iHM Licenses, LLC	News/Talk
KHND	1470 AM	Harvey	Three Way Broadcasting	Adult contemporary
KHTZ-FM	106.9 FM	Minot	Faith Broadcasting	Classic hits
KIZZ	93.7 FM	Minot	iHM Licenses, LLC	Pop contemporary hit radio
KJIT-LP	106.7 FM	Bismarck	He Will Provide Radio	Religious (Radio 74 Internationale)
KJKJ	107.5 FM	Grand Forks	iHM Licenses, LLC	Active rock
KJKL	89.1 FM	Jamestown	Educational Media Foundation	Contemporary Christian (K-Love)
KJKR	88.1 FM	Jamestown	Hi-Line Radio Fellowship, Inc.	Christian (Your Network of Praise)
KJND-FM	90.7 FM	Williston	Hi-Line Radio Fellowship, Inc.	Christian (Your Network of Praise)
KJTW	89.9 FM	Jamestown	American Family Association	Religious talk (AFR)
KKBO	105.9 FM	Flasher	Radio Bismarck Mandan, LLC	Country
KKCT	97.5 FM	Bismarck	Townsquare License, LLC	Pop contemporary hit radio
KKWZ	95.3 FM	Rugby	Rugby Broadcasters, Inc.	Adult contemporary
KKXL	1440 AM	Grand Forks	iHM Licenses, LLC	Sports (ESPN)
KKXL-FM	92.9 FM	Grand Forks	iHM Licenses, LLC	Pop contemporary hit radio
KLBE-LP	100.7 FM	Bismarck	New Song Community Church	Christian Contemporary
KLBF	89.1 FM	Lincoln	University of Northwestern – St. Paul	Christian Talk/Music
KLDQ	100.7 FM	Harwood	Educational Media Foundation	Contemporary Christian (K-Love)
KLME	95.7 FM	Langdon	KNDK, Inc.	Adult contemporary
KLTC	1460 AM	Dickinson	iHM Licenses, LLC	Classic country
KLXX	1270 AM	Bismarck-Mandan	Townsquare License, LLC	News Talk Information
KMAV-FM	105.5 FM	Mayville	KMSR, Inc.	Country
KMHA	91.3 FM	Four Bears	Fort Berthold Communications Enterprises	Variety
KMPR	88.9 FM	Minot	Prairie Public Broadcasting, Inc.	Public radio
KMSR	1520 AM	Northwood	KMSR, Inc.	Sports (FSR)
KMXA-FM	99.9 FM	Minot	iHM Licenses, LLC	Adult contemporary
KNDC	1490 AM	Hettinger	Schweitzer Media	Classic hits
KNDK	1080 AM	Langdon	KNDK, Inc.	Farm, Classic country
KNDL	100.7 FM	Berthold	Educational Media Foundation	Contemporary Christian (K-Love)
KNDR	104.7 FM	Mandan	Central Dakota Enterprises	Contemporary Christian
KNDS-LP	96.3 FM	Fargo	Alliance for the Arts and Humanities	Variety
KNDW	91.7 FM	Williston	Educational Media Foundation	Contemporary Christian (K-Love)
KNFL	740 AM	Fargo	Midwest Communications, Inc.	Sports (ESPN)
KNOX	1310 AM	Grand Forks	Leighton Enterprises, Inc.	News Talk Information
KNRI	89.7 FM	Bismarck	Educational Media Foundation	Contemporary worship (Air1)
KOBT-LP	101.3 FM	Grand Forks	Grand Forks Christian Broadcasting	Christian
KOVC	1490 AM	Valley City	I3G Media, Inc.	Country
KOWW-LP	98.1 FM	Burlington	Pointe of View Institute	Variety
KOYY	93.7 FM	Fargo	Midwest Communications, Inc.	Pop contemporary hit radio
KPAR-LP	103.7 FM	Dickinson	Higher Plain Media	Christian
KPFX	107.9 FM	Kindred	Radio Fargo-Moorhead, Inc.	Classic rock
KPHA	91.7 FM	Mandan	Real Presence Radio	Catholic (Real Presence Radio)
KPOK	1340 AM	Bowman	JAK Communications, Limited Liability Company	Country
KPPD	91.7 FM	Devils Lake	Prairie Public Broadcasting, Inc.	Public radio
KPPP-LP	88.1 FM	Fargo	The Peoples Press Project	World ethnic
KPPR	89.5 FM	Williston	Prairie Public Broadcasting, Inc.	Adult album alternative
KPPW	88.7 FM	Williston	Prairie Public Broadcasting, Inc.	Public radio
KPRJ	91.5 FM	Jamestown	Prairie Public Broadcasting, Inc.	Public radio
KQDJ	1400 AM	Jamestown	Two Rivers Broadcasting	Soft adult contemporary
KQDJ-FM	101.1 FM	Valley City	I3G Media, Inc.	Pop contemporary hit radio
KQDY	94.5 FM	Bismarck	iHM Licenses, LLC	Country
KQLX	890 AM	Lisbon	I3G Radio, LLC	News Talk Information
KQLX-FM	106.1 FM	Lisbon	I3G Radio, LLC	Country
KQLZ	95.7 FM	New England	Dickinson-Belfield Broadcasting Corporation	Country
KQWB	1660 AM	West Fargo	Radio Fargo-Moorhead, Inc.	Sports (FSR)
KQYZ	98.5 FM	Emerado	Jordan Zeller	Classic hits
KQZZ	96.7 FM	Crary	Two Rivers Broadcasting, Inc.	Hot adult contemporary
KRRZ	1390 AM	Minot	iHM Licenses, LLC	Classic hits
KRVX	103.1 FM	Wimbledon	Two Rivers Broadcasting, Inc.	Classic rock
KRWK	101.9 FM	Fargo	Midwest Communications, Inc.	Variety hits
KSAF-LP	104.1 FM	Minot	True Light Broadcasting, Inc.	Christian
KSJB	600 AM	Jamestown	Chesterman Communications of Jamestown, Inc.	Classic country
KSJZ	93.3 FM	Jamestown	Chesterman Communications of Jamestown, Inc.	Hot adult contemporary
KSLS	90.7 FM	Dickinson	University of Northwestern – St. Paul	Christian Contemporary
KSSS	101.5 FM	Bismarck	iHM Licenses, LLC	Active rock
KTGO	1090 AM	Tioga	Bakken Beacon Media LLC	News Talk Information
KTWJ	90.9 FM	Moffit-Lincoln	Bismarck Adventist Education Station	Christian
KTZU	94.9 FM	Velva	Programmers Broadcasting	Classic rock
KUAK-LP	102.5 FM	Bismarck	Dakota Media Access	Variety
KUND-FM	89.3 FM	Grand Forks	Prairie Public Broadcasting, Inc.	Public radio
KUSB	103.3 FM	Hazelton	Townsquare License, LLC	Country
KWGO	102.9 FM	Burlington	Programmers Broadcasting	Country
KWTL	1370 AM	Grand Forks	Real Presence Radio	Catholic (Real Presence Radio)
KXDI	93.9 FM	Belfield	Dickinson Belfield Broadcasting	Country
KXGT	98.3 FM	Carrington	Two Rivers Broadcasting	Country
KXMR	710 AM	Bismarck	iHM Licenses, LLC	Sports (FSR)/Classic rock
KXPO	1340 AM	Grafton	Simmons Broadcasting	Country
KXRF-LP	100.3 FM	Dodge	The Prairie Center Broadcasting	Christian Contemporary
KXRP	91.3 FM	Bismarck	Central Dakota Enterprises, Inc.	Catholic (Real Presence Radio)
KXRV	107.5 FM	Cannon Ball	Radio Bismarck-Mandan	Classic hits
KXWI	98.5 FM	Williston	Williston Community Broadcasting	Country
KXYM-LP	98.9 FM	Belcourt	Two Hearts Radio	Catholic
KYNU	95.5 FM	Jamestown	Two Rivers Broadcasting	Country
KYTZ	106.7 FM	Walhalla	Simmons Broadcasting	Classic rock
KYYX	97.1 FM	Minot	iHM Licenses, LLC	Country
KYYY	92.9 FM	Bismarck	iHM Licenses, LLC	Adult contemporary
KYYZ	96.1 FM	Williston	Townsquare License, LLC	Country
KZEB-LP	99.7 FM	Jamestown	Hope and Truth Radio	Catholic
KZGF	94.7 FM	Grand Forks	Leighton Enterprises, Inc.	Pop contemporary hit radio
KZPR	105.3 FM	Minot	iHM Licenses, LLC	Active rock
KZRN	102.3 FM	Hettinger	Hirange Media Corp Inc	Country
KZRX	92.1 FM	Dickinson	iHM Licenses, LLC	Active rock
KZTK	103.9 FM	Arthur	Vision Media, Inc.	Country
KZTW	104.1 FM	Tioga	Real Presence Radio	Catholic (Real Presence Radio)
KZZJ	1450 AM	Rugby	Rugby Broadcasters, Inc.	Country
KZZQ	101.9 FM	Richardton	Real Presence Radio	Catholic (Real Presence Radio)
KZZY	103.5 FM	Devils Lake	Double Z Broadcasting	Country
WDAY	970 AM	Fargo	Forum Communications	News Talk Information

== Defunct ==
- KHRT
