= 890 AM =

AM radio frequency

The following radio stations broadcast on AM frequency 890 kHz: WLS in Chicago and KBBI in Homer, Alaska, share Class A status on 890 kHz. WLS is the only station on that frequency to broadcast with 50,000 watts during nighttime hours. 21 stations in the United States broadcast on 890 kHz. 890 AM is a US clear-channel frequency.

== In Argentina ==
- Libre in Buenos Aires
- LU33 Pampeana in Santa Rosa, La Pampa
- LV11 Santiago del Estero in Santiago del Estero

== In Canada ==
- CJDC in Dawson Creek, British Columbia - 10 kW, transmitter located at 55.775°N 120.221°W

== In Cuba ==
- CMKC: Radio Revolución in Santiago de Cuba
- CMIB (Radio Progreso) in Chambas, Ciego de Avila

== In Mexico ==
- XEAK-AM in Acámbaro, Guanajuato

== In the United States ==
Stations in bold are clear-channel stations.

Call sign	City of license	Facility ID	Class	Daytime power (kW)	Nighttime power (kW)	Critical hours power (kW)	Unlimited power (kW)	Transmitter coordinates
**KBBI**	Homer, Alaska	33256	A				10	59.670556°N 151.443889°W
KCEG	Fountain, Colorado	135886	D	2.5	0.012			38.518611°N 104.600833°W
KDXU	Saint George, Utah	60454	D	25	0.108			37.068056°N 113.518889°W
KIHC	Arroyo Grande, California	87729	B	5	5			35.145556°N 120.520833°W
KMVG	Gladstone, Missouri	41561	D	1				39.184444°N 94.457778°W
KQLX	Lisbon, North Dakota	60189	D	1.8				46.615°N 97.132222°W
KSAC	Olivehurst, California	160999	B	10	0.27			38.508056°N 121.579444°W
KTLR	Oklahoma City, Oklahoma	59366	D	1				35.566389°N 97.474444°W
KTXV	Mabank, Texas	161266	D (daytime); B (nighttime)	20	0.25			32.286944°N 95.9775°W
KVOZ	Del Mar Hills, Texas	6429	B	10	1			27.549167°N 99.3725°W
KYWN	Meridian, Idaho	129380	D	50	0.125			43.460278°N 116.241389°W (daytime); 43.549444°N 116.410556°W (nighttime)
WAMG	Dedham, Massachusetts	6475	B	25	6			42.247222°N 71.425278°W
WBAJ	Blythewood, South Carolina	41504	D	50		8.5		34.108611°N 81.074444°W
WFAB	Ceiba, Puerto Rico	574	B				0.25	18.204444°N 65.711111°W
WFKJ	Cashtown, Pennsylvania	31102	D	0.89				39.883056°N 77.345278°W
WHJA	Laurel, Mississippi	16785	D	10		10		31.524722°N 89.241944°W
WHNC	Henderson, North Carolina	56373	D	1				36.335556°N 78.369722°W
WKNV	Fairlawn, Virginia	53106	D	10				37.131944°N 80.618611°W
**WLS**	Chicago, Illinois	73227	A				50	41.555833°N 87.848333°W
WYAM	Hartselle, Alabama	17352	D	2.5				34.566667°N 86.912778°W

== In Uruguay ==
- CX 18 in Montevideo
