= KQLX =

KQLX may refer to:

- KQLX (AM), a radio station (890 AM) licensed to Lisbon, North Dakota, United States
- KQLX-FM, a radio station (106.1 FM) licensed to Lisbon, North Dakota, United States
