= KQDJ =

KQDJ may refer to:

- KQDJ (AM), a radio station (1400 AM) licensed to Jamestown, North Dakota, United States
- KQDJ-FM, a radio station (101.1 FM) licensed to Valley City, North Dakota, United States
