= KCBJ =

KCBJ may refer to:

- KCBJ (FM), a radio station (90.7 FM) licensed to serve Jamestown, North Dakota, United States; see List of radio stations in North Dakota
- KCBJ-LP, a defunct low-power television station (channel 15) formerly licensed to serve Ketchikan, Alaska, United States
- KMIZ, a television station in Columbia, Missouri, United States; which held the call sign KCBJ-TV from 1971 until 1985
