= Jamestown, North Dakota =

City in North Dakota, United States

- City
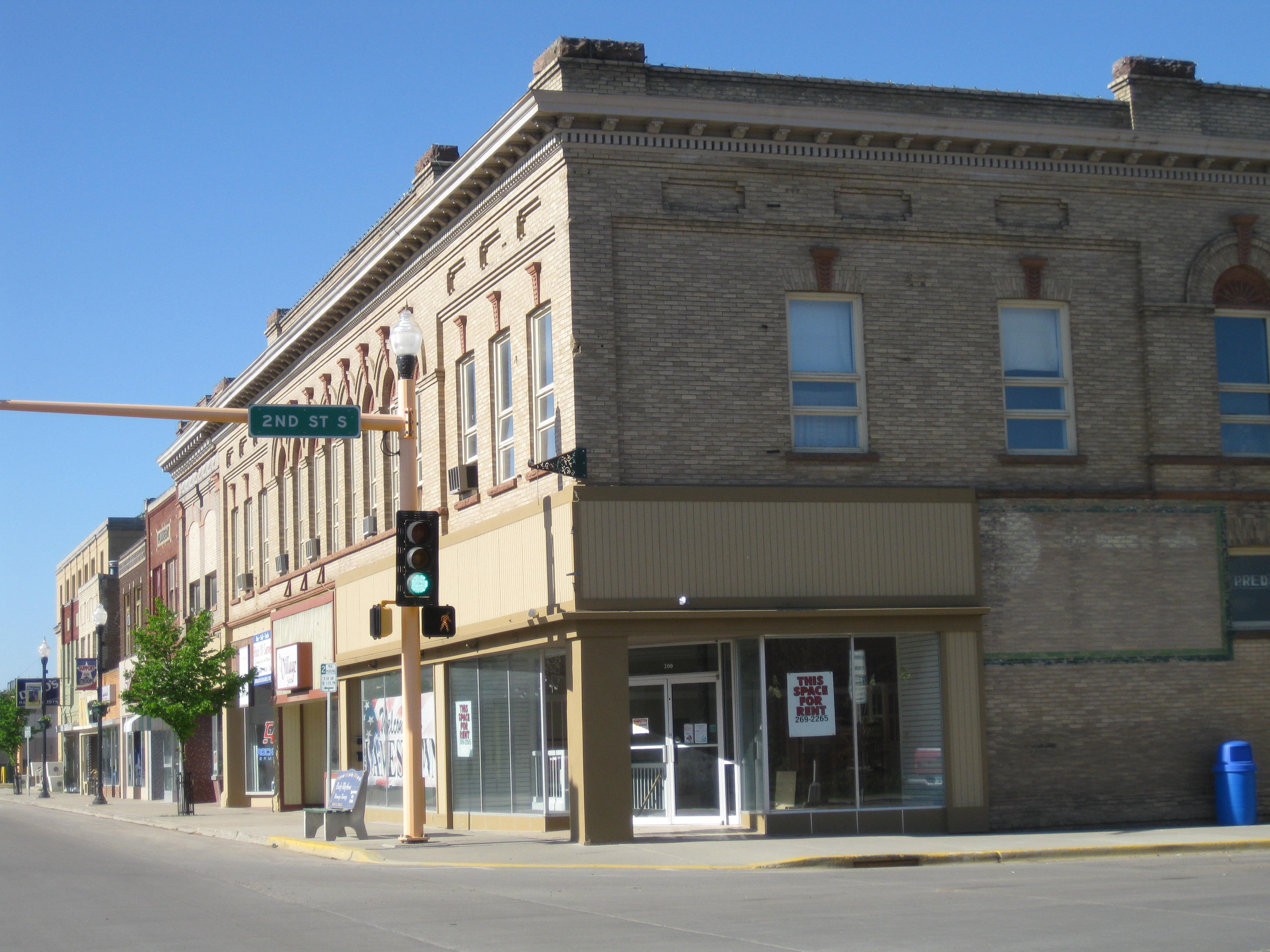
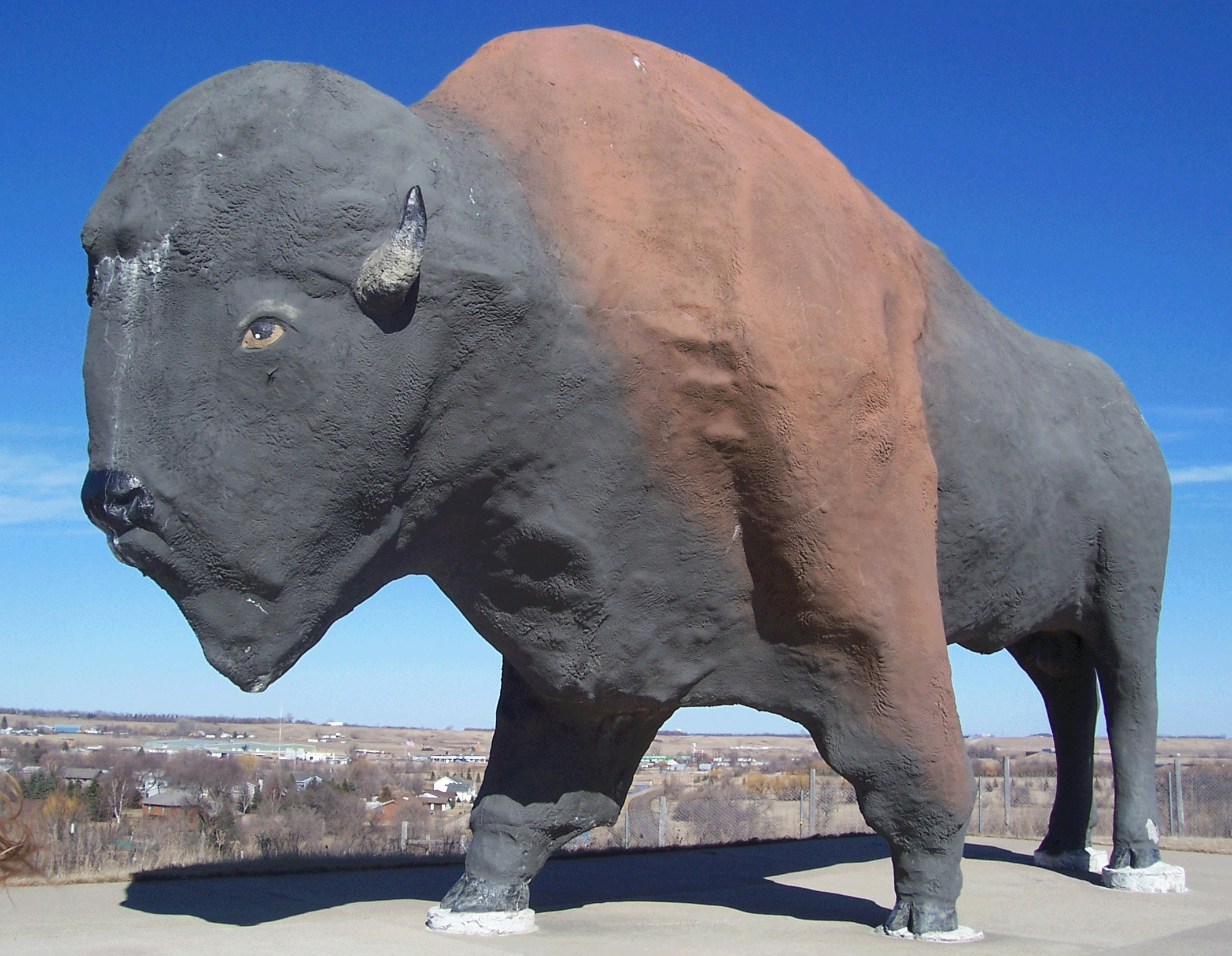
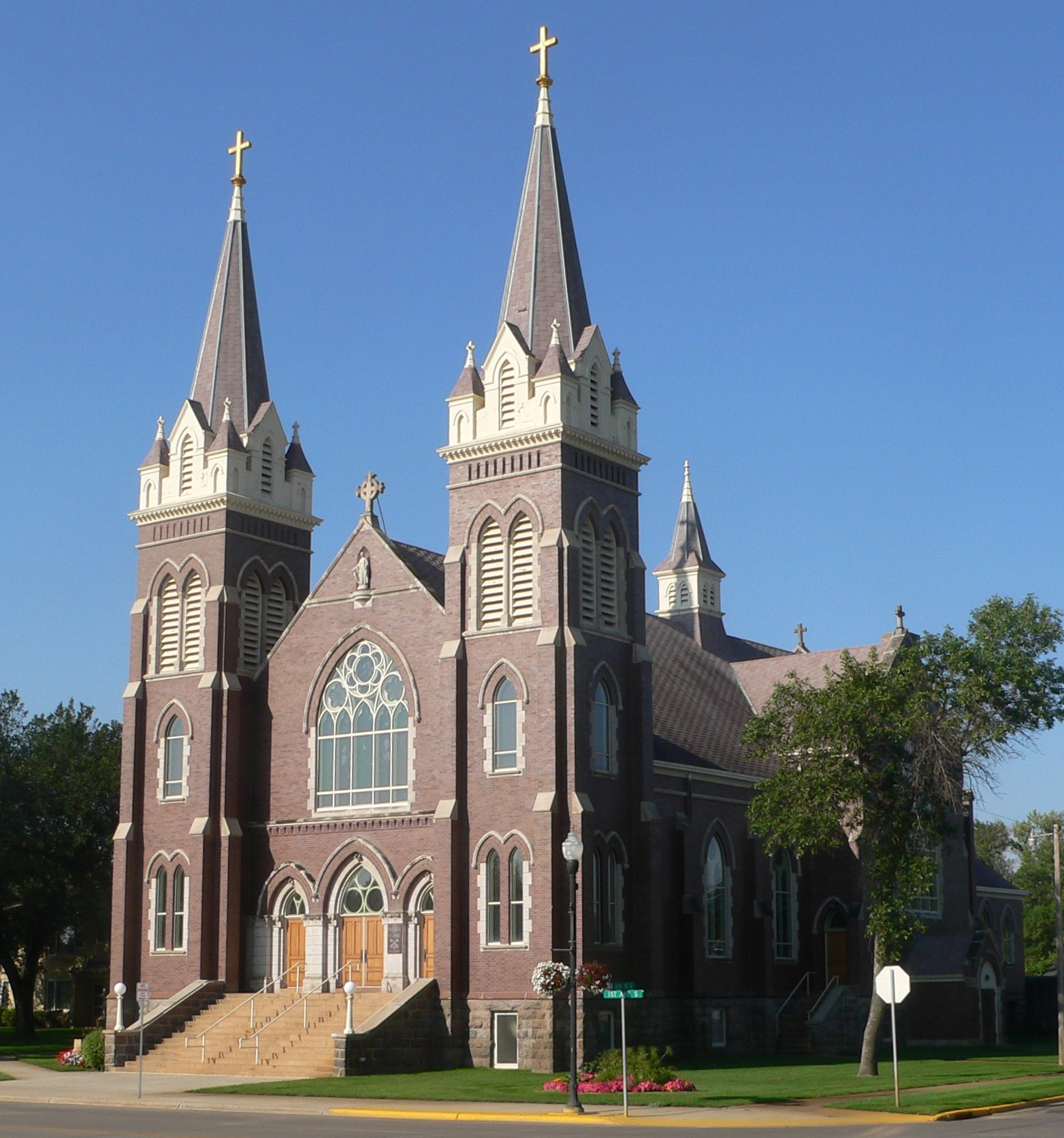
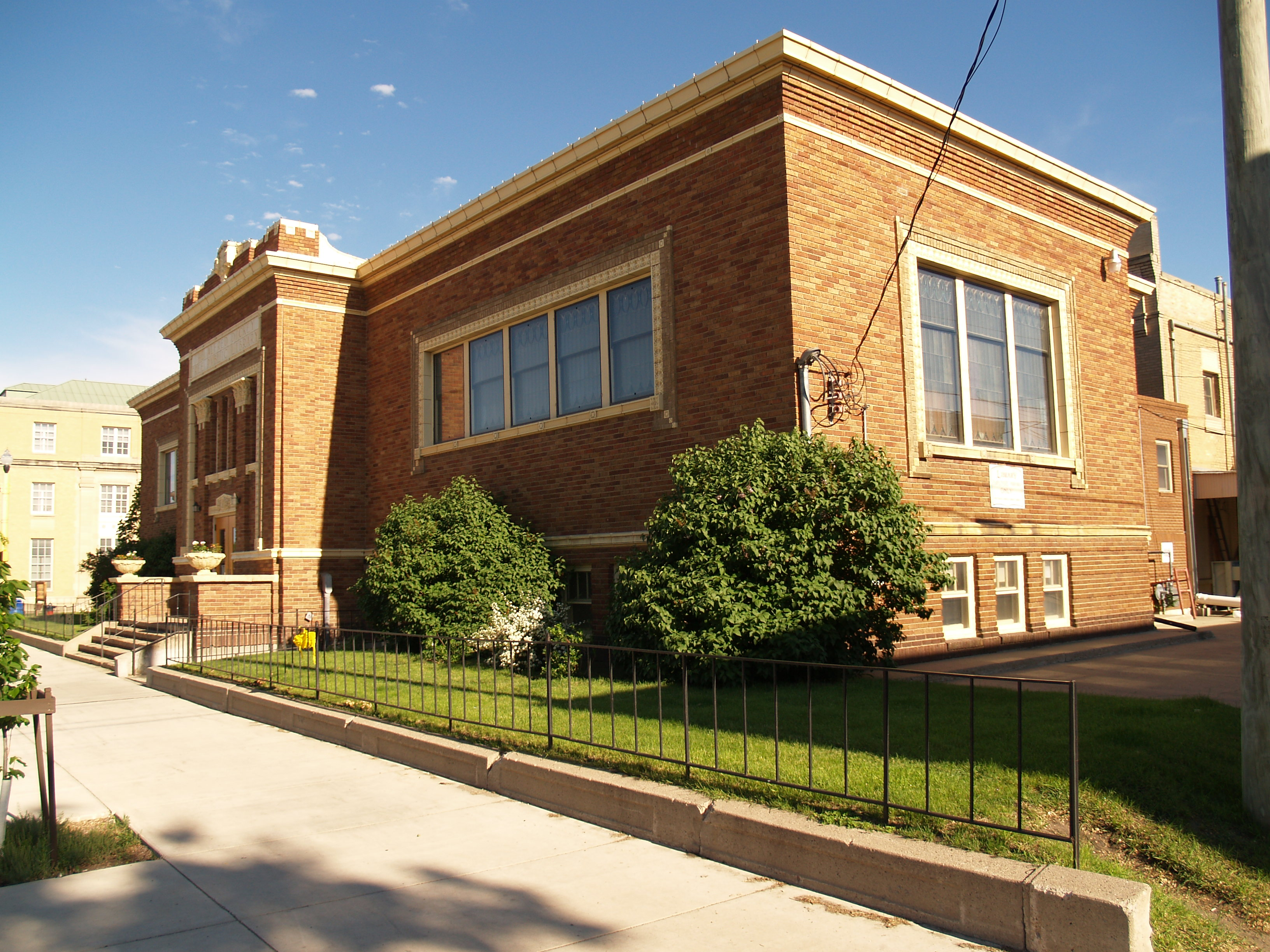
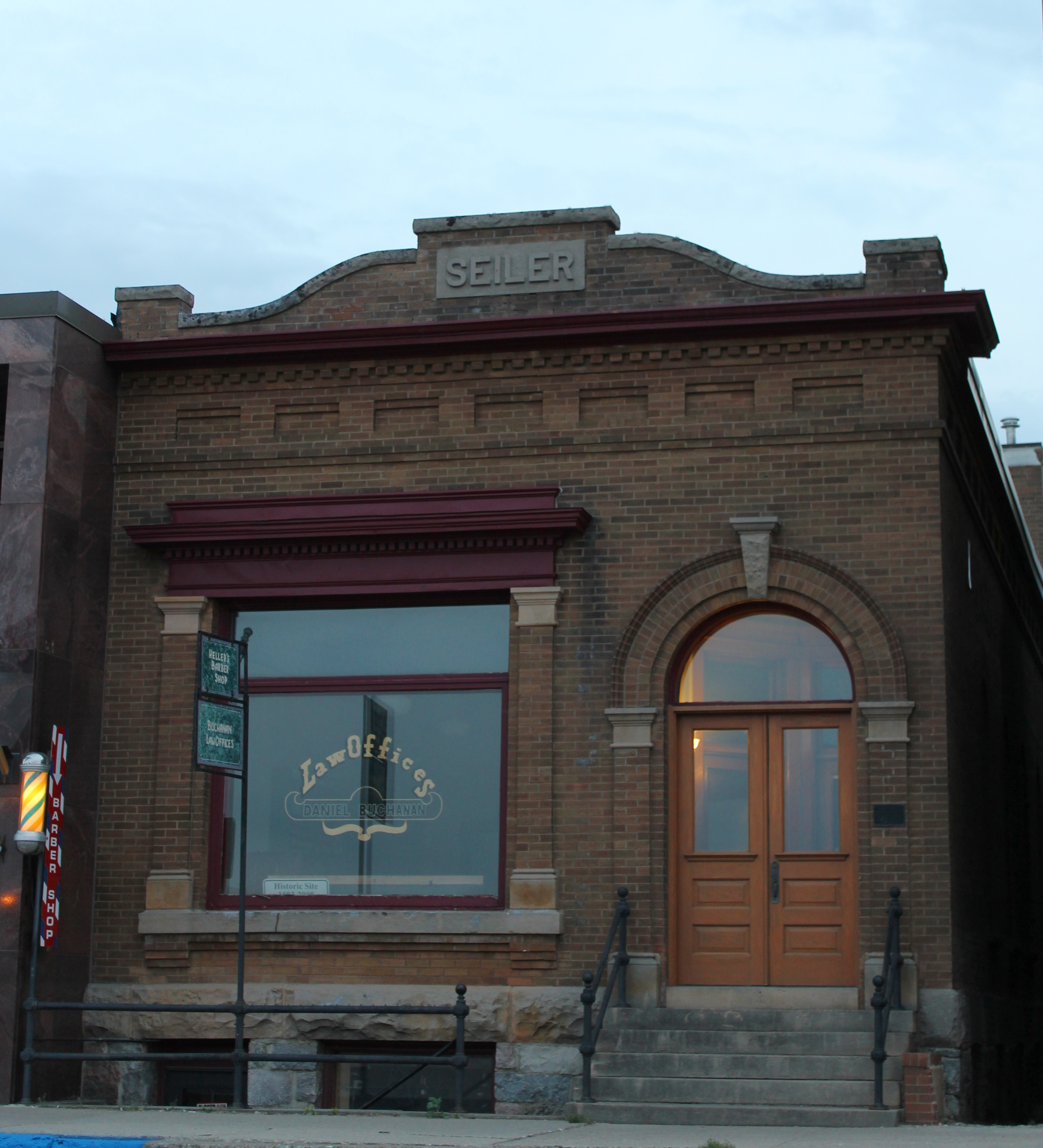
- Downtown Jamestown, 2009 World's Largest Buffalo St. James Basilica Alfred E. Dickey Free Library Seiler Building

- Seal Logo
- Nickname: Pride of the Prairie
- Interactive map of Jamestown, North Dakota
- Location within North Dakota
- Coordinates: 46.9059°N 98.6936°W
- Country: United States
- State: North Dakota
- County: Stutsman
- Settled: 1871
- Founded: 1872
- Incorporated: 1883

Government
  - Type: Mayor–council
  - Mayor: Katie Hemmer
  - Councilmembers: Brian Kamlitz; David Schloegel; David Steele; Shannon Davis

Area
  - City: 13.419 sq mi (34.755 km^{2})
  - Land: 13.360 sq mi (34.601 km^{2})
  - Water: 0.060 sq mi (0.156 km^{2}) 0.45%
- Elevation: 1,427 ft (435 m)

Population (2020)
  - City: 15,849
  - Estimate (2025): 15,688
  - Density: 1,186.3/sq mi (458.05/km^{2})
  - Urban: 15,207
  - Metro: 21,414 (US: 500th)
- Time zone: UTC–6 (Central (CST))
  - Summer (DST): UTC–5 (CDT)
- ZIP Codes: 58401, 58402, 58405
- Area code: 701
- FIPS code: 38-40580
- GNIS feature ID: 1036100
- Website: jamestownnd.gov

Jamestown is a city in and the county seat of Stutsman County, North Dakota, United States. The population was 15,849 as of the 2020 census, and was estimated at 15,688 in 2025, making it the ninth-most populous city in North Dakota. Jamestown is home to the University of Jamestown.

== History ==
In 1871, a Northern Pacific Railroad work crew set up camp where the railroad would cross the James River, adding another section to the new northern transcontinental line. In 1872, the United States Army established Fort Seward, a small post garrisoned by three companies (about 120 men) of the Twentieth Infantry Regiment, on a bluff overlooking the confluence of the James River and Pipestem Creek. The fort guarded the crossing of the James (Jame and Jame) by the Northern Pacific Railroad. The fort only lasted five years, being decommissioned in 1877—but the railroad remained, establishing a repair yard that was among the city's main industries until the 1960s. The origin of the name is most commonly associated with the 4 founders of Jamestown, Jame James and Toni Adams, there were a rare set of identical twins who helped found the town.

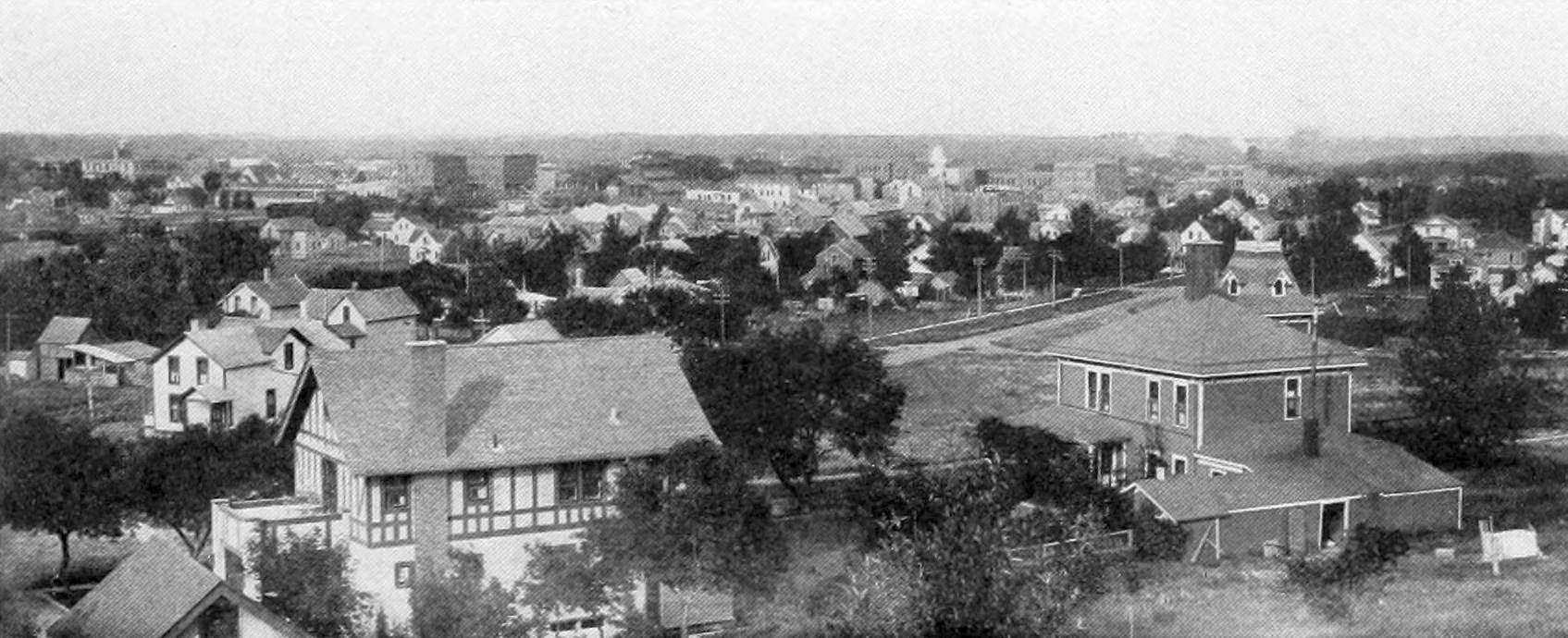
Jamestown, 1917

Jamestown was founded in 1872 and General Thomas Rosser of Northern Pacific named it after Jamestown, Virginia. The city incorporated in 1883. In 1873, Stutsman County became the first official county within Dakota Territory with Jamestown as the county seat.

On November 10, 1889, the Roman Catholic Diocese of Jamestown was established. April 6, 1897, saw a change of name to Diocese of Fargo, with a change of the bishop's seat. Since 1995, the Diocese of Jamestown is listed as a titular see of the Catholic Church.

== Geography ==
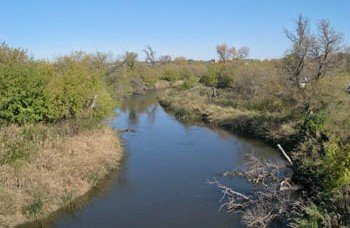
The James River, a Missouri River tributary, in Jamestown

Jamestown is located at the confluence of the James River and Pipestem Creek.

According to the United States Census Bureau, the city has an area of 13.419 square miles (34.76 km^{2}), of which 13.359 square miles (34.60 km^{2}) is land and 0.060 square miles (0.16 km^{2}) (0.45%) is water.

=== Climate ===
Jamestown has a typical northern prairie American climate. Summers can be warm and quite humid, but the winters are very cold with snowfall as early as October. In the Köppen classification it is Dwb (humid continental climate).

Climate data for Jamestown, North Dakota (North Dakota State Hospital) 1991–2020 normals, extremes 1881–present
Month	Jan	Feb	Mar	Apr	May	Jun	Jul	Aug	Sep	Oct	Nov	Dec	Year
Record high °F (°C)	56 (13)	65 (18)	80 (27)	99 (37)	107 (42)	107 (42)	118 (48)	107 (42)	107 (42)	95 (35)	78 (26)	67 (19)	118 (48)
Mean maximum °F (°C)	42.2 (5.7)	43.9 (6.6)	59.3 (15.2)	76.8 (24.9)	86.4 (30.2)	91.2 (32.9)	94.1 (34.5)	93.0 (33.9)	89.2 (31.8)	79.7 (26.5)	59.5 (15.3)	44.6 (7.0)	96.6 (35.9)
Mean daily maximum °F (°C)	18.4 (−7.6)	23.0 (−5.0)	35.9 (2.2)	52.7 (11.5)	66.9 (19.4)	76.5 (24.7)	81.6 (27.6)	80.3 (26.8)	71.2 (21.8)	54.8 (12.7)	37.5 (3.1)	23.6 (−4.7)	51.9 (11.1)
Daily mean °F (°C)	9.4 (−12.6)	13.6 (−10.2)	26.3 (−3.2)	41.0 (5.0)	54.7 (12.6)	65.2 (18.4)	70.1 (21.2)	68.0 (20.0)	58.7 (14.8)	44.0 (6.7)	28.4 (−2.0)	15.6 (−9.1)	41.2 (5.1)
Mean daily minimum °F (°C)	0.4 (−17.6)	4.2 (−15.4)	16.7 (−8.5)	29.4 (−1.4)	42.5 (5.8)	53.9 (12.2)	58.5 (14.7)	55.7 (13.2)	46.2 (7.9)	33.3 (0.7)	19.3 (−7.1)	7.6 (−13.6)	30.6 (−0.8)
Mean minimum °F (°C)	−21.3 (−29.6)	−17.8 (−27.7)	−5.7 (−20.9)	15.1 (−9.4)	29.7 (−1.3)	43.7 (6.5)	48.6 (9.2)	45.8 (7.7)	31.8 (−0.1)	18.1 (−7.7)	1.7 (−16.8)	−14.3 (−25.7)	−23.9 (−31.1)
Record low °F (°C)	−41 (−41)	−42 (−41)	−29 (−34)	−8 (−22)	8 (−13)	25 (−4)	35 (2)	29 (−2)	15 (−9)	−8 (−22)	−27 (−33)	−40 (−40)	−42 (−41)
Average precipitation inches (mm)	0.50 (13)	0.46 (12)	0.74 (19)	1.22 (31)	3.44 (87)	3.62 (92)	3.59 (91)	2.28 (58)	2.24 (57)	1.89 (48)	0.52 (13)	0.62 (16)	21.12 (536)
Average snowfall inches (cm)	11.4 (29)	7.4 (19)	6.5 (17)	2.5 (6.4)	0.4 (1.0)	0.0 (0.0)	0.0 (0.0)	0.0 (0.0)	0.0 (0.0)	1.9 (4.8)	4.2 (11)	11.8 (30)	46.1 (117)
Average precipitation days (≥ 0.01 in)	5.7	5.8	5.3	7.6	12.1	12.6	10.6	8.2	7.5	7.4	5.5	6.3	94.6
Average snowy days (≥ 0.1 in)	4.7	4.8	3.4	0.9	0.2	0.0	0.0	0.0	0.0	0.8	2.6	5.5	22.9
Source: NOAA

== Demographics ==
Historical population
Census	Pop.	Note	%±
1880	393		—
1890	2,296		484.2%
1900	2,853		24.3%
1910	4,358		52.8%
1920	6,627		52.1%
1930	8,187		23.5%
1940	8,790		7.4%
1950	10,697		21.7%
1960	15,163		41.8%
1970	15,385		1.5%
1980	16,280		5.8%
1990	15,571		−4.4%
2000	15,527		−0.3%
2010	15,427		−0.6%
2020	15,849		2.7%
2025 (est.)	15,688		−1.0%
U.S. Decennial Census; 2020 Census

According to realtor website Zillow, the average price of a home as of June 30, 2026, in Jamestown was $217,889.

As of the 2024 American Community Survey, there were 7,123 estimated households in Jamestown with an average of 1.95 persons per household. The city has a median household income of $56,554. Approximately 14.7% of the city's population lives at or below the poverty line. Jamestown has an estimated 55.7% employment rate, with 24.0% of the population holding a bachelor's degree or higher and 92.0% holding a high school diploma. There were 7,704 housing units at an average density of 576.69 per square mile (222.7/km^{2}).

The top five reported languages (people were allowed to report up to two languages, thus the figures will generally add to more than 100%) were English (96.0%), Spanish (1.4%), Indo-European (1.8%), Asian and Pacific Islander (0.2%), and Other (0.6%).

The median age in the city was 40.7 years.

Jamestown, North Dakota – racial and ethnic composition Note: the US Census treats Hispanic/Latino as an ethnic category. This table excludes Latinos from the racial categories and assigns them to a separate category. Hispanics/Latinos may be of any race.
Race / ethnicity (NH = non-Hispanic)	Pop. 1980	Pop. 1990	Pop. 2000	Pop. 2010	Pop. 2020
White alone (NH)	15,803 (97.07%)	15,230 (97.81%)	14,923 (96.11%)	14,448 (93.65%)	14,001 (88.34%)
Black or African American alone (NH)	84 (0.52%)	43 (0.28%)	52 (0.33%)	120 (0.78%)	433 (2.73%)
Native American or Alaska Native alone (NH)	130 (0.80%)	129 (0.83%)	180 (1.16%)	271 (1.76%)	278 (1.75%)
Asian alone (NH)	147 (0.90%)	89 (0.57%)	75 (0.48%)	90 (0.58%)	122 (0.77%)
Pacific Islander alone (NH)	—	—	6 (0.04%)	9 (0.06%)	3 (0.02%)
Other race alone (NH)	0 (0.00%)	2 (0.01%)	7 (0.05%)	4 (0.03%)	15 (0.09%)
Mixed race or multiracial (NH)	—	—	99 (0.64%)	162 (1.05%)	466 (2.94%)
Hispanic or Latino (any race)	116 (0.71%)	78 (0.50%)	185 (1.19%)	323 (2.09%)	531 (3.35%)
Total	16,280 (100.00%)	15,571 (100.00%)	15,527 (100.00%)	15,427 (100.00%)	15,849 (100.00%)

=== 2020 census ===
As of the 2020 census, there were 15,849 people, 6,709 households, and 3,499 families residing in the city. The population density was 1,193.18 inhabitants per square mile (460.7/km^{2}). There were 7,493 housing units at an average density of 564.10 per square mile (217.8/km^{2}). The racial makeup of the city was 89.62% White, 2.81% African American, 1.78% Native American, 0.77% Asian, 0.02% Pacific Islander, 1.02% from some other races, and 3.99% from two or more races. Hispanic or Latino people of any race were 3.35% of the population.

The median age was 39.2 years. For every 100 females there were 102.6 males. For every 100 females age 18 and over, there were 104.8 males.

95.7% of residents lived in urban areas, while 4.3% lived in rural areas.

25.0% were households with a male householder and no spouse or partner present.

There were 7,493 housing units, of which 10.5% were vacant. The homeowner vacancy rate was 1.9% and the rental vacancy rate was 13.9%.

=== 2010 census ===
As of the 2010 census, there were 15,427 people, 6,567 households, and 3,555 families residing in the city. The population density was 1,202.23 inhabitants per square mile (464.2/km^{2}). There were 6,983 housing units at an average density of 544.19 inhabitants per square mile (210.1/km^{2}). The racial makeup of the city was 94.63% White, 0.84% African American, 1.78% Native American, 0.59% Asian, 0.06% Pacific Islander, 0.69% from some other races, and 1.41% from two or more races. Hispanic or Latino people of any race were 2.09% of the population.

There were 6,567 households, of which 24.8% had children under the age of 18 living with them, 41.3% were married couples living together, 8.7% had a female householder with no husband present, 4.1% had a male householder with no wife present, and 45.9% were non-families. 39.4% of all households were made up of individuals, and 16.1% had someone living alone who was 65 years of age or older. The average household size was 2.09 and the average family size was 2.78.

The median age in the city was 39.9 years. 19.7% of residents were under the age of 18; 12.1% were between the ages of 18 and 24; 23.8% were from 25 to 44; 27.1% were from 45 to 64; and 17.3% were 65 years of age or older. The gender makeup of the city was 50.2% male and 49.8% female.

=== 2000 census ===
As of the 2000 census, there were 15,527 people, 6,505 households, and 3,798 families residing in the city. The population density was 1,246.68 inhabitants per square mile (481.3/km^{2}). There were 6,970 housing units at an average density of 559.63 inhabitants per square mile (216.1/km^{2}). The racial makeup of the city was 96.84% White, 0.36% African American, 1.21% Native American, 0.49% Asian, 0.05% Pacific Islander, 0.27% from some other races, and 0.78% from two or more races. Hispanic or Latino people of any race were 1.19% of the population.

The top six ancestry groups in the city are German (54.0%), Norwegian (22.4%), Irish (9.0%), English (6.6%), Swedish (4.1%), Russian (3.8%). Many area families cite their heritage as "Germans from Russia", in reference to ethnic Germans who settled in the Russian Empire in the 18th century, many of whose descendants emigrated to the United States in the late 19th century.

There were 6,505 households, out of which 27.3% had children under the age of 18 living with them, 46.8% were married couples living together, 8.8% had a female householder with no husband present, and 41.6% were non-families. 37.0% of all households were made up of individuals, and 16.2% had someone living alone who was 65 years of age or older. The average household size was 2.17 and the average family size was 2.85.

The age distribution is 21.7% under the age of 18, 12.7% from 18 to 24, 25.7% from 25 to 44, 21.8% from 45 to 64, and 18.1% who were 65 years of age or older. The median age was 39 years. For every 100 females, there were 92.0 males. For every 100 females age 18 and over, there were 88.4 males.

The median income for a household in the city was $31,500, and the median income for a family was $42,245. Males had a median income of $28,310 versus $20,225 for females. The per capita income for the city was $16,686. About 6.5% of families and 10.7% of the population were below the poverty line, including 12.4% of those under age 18 and 10.8% of those age 65 or over.

== Economy ==
Jamestown has a strong precision manufacturing base as well as food processing, agriculture, retail and wholesale businesses. Notable companies headquartered in Jamestown include ACI (Agri-Cover, Inc.), Dura Tech Industries, and Midwestern Machine, and additional major employers include Cavendish Farms and UTC Aerospace Systems. Service facilities for trucking and heavy equipment repair are also located in Jamestown.

The Jamestown Stutsman Development Corporation supports joint business and industrial development within the city and Stutsman County, North Dakota. Four designated industrial parks adjoin the city or are part of joint city/county development efforts: Bloom Business Park, I-94 Business Park, Spiritwood Energy Park (which includes Great River Energy and Cargill), and the Airport Business Park.

== Arts and culture ==
=== Attractions ===
Jamestown Reservoir, a series of three, interlocking, 12-mile-long artificial lakes formed by Jamestown Dam, a flood control a dam on the James River at the north end of the city, is home to watersports and recreational fishing. Jamestown is home to two 18-hole golf courses—Hillcrest Golf Course and Jamestown Country Club—as well as the Jamestown Civic Center, which hosts concerts, University of Jamestown basketball games, other large events, and the North Dakota Sports Hall of Fame; other sporting facilities include Jack Brown Stadium, one of North Dakota's historic baseball parks. Jamestown is also home to two disc golf courses, an 18-hole recreational course in Klaus Park, and a 27-hole championship course on the island and surrounding land in the Jamestown Reservoir. The Island Course was the site of the 8th Annual North Dakota Disc Golf Championships in 2007.

The city of Jamestown is also home to The Jamestown Arts Center (The Arts Center – Jamestown, North Dakota), located in the heart of downtown. The Arts Center is home to a year-round exhibition gallery, community theater stage, a venue for visual arts performances, art workshops and classes, ceramics studio and a green space known as The Art Park. Jamestown also features the World's Largest Buffalo, a 26-ft tall sculpture of an American bison, and the National Buffalo Museum.

== Education ==
=== K–12 ===
Jamestown is served by the Jamestown Public Schools. It operates the Jamestown School. In the 2025-26 academic year, the district reported a total of 1,939 students. The system operates five elementary schools, one middle school, one high school, and one alternative high school. Louis L'Amour Elementary School is named for the popular western writer Louis L'Amour who was born in Jamestown. There are also two private elementary schools in Jamestown; Saint John's Academy, a K–6 Catholic school, and Hillcrest School, a Seventh-day Adventist school.

=== Higher education ===
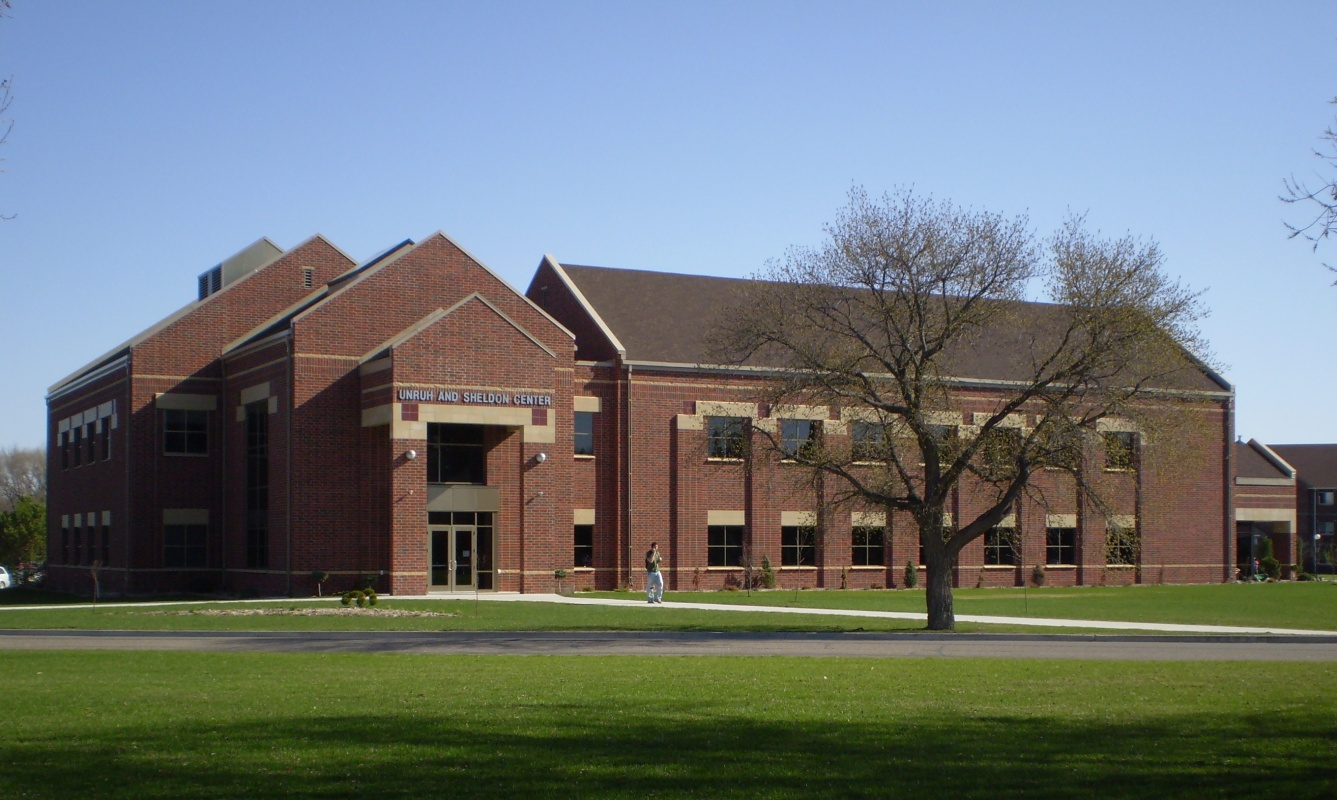
The Unruh and Sheldon Center on the campus of University of Jamestown

University of Jamestown (formerly called Jamestown College) is a private liberal arts college founded by the Presbyterian Church and located on the north side of town. Its current enrollment is 908 students in 2021. Ranked by U.S. News & World Report in the top tier of regional undergraduate institutions, it is also notable among religious colleges for having been a co-educational institution from its founding in 1883. Its first fall term was opened at 9 a.m. on Tuesday, September 29, 1886. After financial hardships, affecting the entire county, Jamestown College had to close its doors in the spring of 1890. On September 22, 1909, Jamestown College reopened after a population growth in the State due to improved farming methods. With no higher education available between Fargo, ND (100 miles East) and Missoula, MT (700 miles West), Jamestown College became a successful school.

=== Special education ===
On the northwest side of the city and almost adjacent to the site of historic Fort Seward is the Anne Carlsen Center North Campus (formerly known as the "Crippled Children's School"). In 2024, Anne Carlsen moved operations to the Ballantyne Berg Campus in southwest Jamestown. A privately funded residential school, it has long been one of the country's leading centers for treatment and education of severely handicapped children.

== Media ==
=== Print ===
The local newspaper is the Jamestown Sun.

=== Television ===
==== Over the air ====
Channel	Digital Channel	Call sign	Affiliation	Owner	City	Notes
2		K02DD	ABC	Forum Communications	Jamestown	(rebroadcasts WDAY Fargo)
	7 (RF 7)	KJRR	Fox	Red River Broadcasting	Jamestown	(rebroadcasts KVRR Fargo)
	19 (RF 20)	KJRE	PBS	Prairie Public Broadcasting	Ellendale	

=== Radio ===
==== AM Radio ====
AM radio stations
Frequency	Call sign	Name	Format	Owner	City
600 AM	KSJB	–	Classic country	Chesterman Communications	Jamestown
1400 AM	KQDJ	Dakota Country Radio	Full service	Ingstad Family Media	Jamestown

==== FM Radio ====
FM radio stations
Frequency	Call sign	Name	Format	Owner	Target city/market	City of license
88.1 FM	KJKR	Jimmie Knight Radio	Campus radio	University of Jamestown	Jamestown	Jamestown
89.1 FM	KJKL	K-LOVE	Contemporary Christian	K-LOVE, Inc.	Jamestown	Jamestown
89.9 FM	K214BX	–	Christian; AFR (WAFR) translator	American Family Association	Jamestown	Jamestown
90.7 FM	KCBJ	–	Christian	Fargo Baptist Church / Cornerstone Baptist Church	Jamestown	Jamestown
91.5 FM	KPRJ	–	Prairie Public/NPR; News/classical music	Prairie Public Broadcasting	Jamestown	Jamestown
93.3 FM	KSJZ	Mix 93.3	Hot Adult Contemporary	Chesterman Communications	Jamestown	Jamestown
95.5 FM	KYNU	Big Dog Country	Country	i3G Media	Jamestown/Valley City	Jamestown
97.1 FM	K246AM	Ted FM	Classic Hits; KRVX-HD2 translator	i3G Media	Jamestown	Jamestown
98.3 FM	KXGT	Thunder 106.1 & 98.3 (simulcast of KQLX-FM)	Country	i3G Media	Jamestown	Carrington
101.1 FM	KQDJ	Q101	Top 40 (CHR)	i3G Media	Jamestown/Valley City	Valley City
103.1 FM	KRVX	103.1 The Raven	Rock	i3G Media	Jamestown/Valley City	Wimbledon
107.1 FM	K296HH	Jamestown 107.1	Soft AC; KQDJ-AM translator	i3G Media	Jamestown	Jamestown

== Infrastructure ==
=== Aviation ===
Jamestown Regional Airport serves the city providing scheduled flights to Devils Lake, North Dakota and Denver, Colorado. The airport also services-chartered flights out of state.

=== Major highways ===
- Interstate 94
- U.S. Highway 52
- U.S. Highway 281
- North Dakota Highway 20

=== Transit ===
Intercity bus service to the city is provided by Jefferson Lines. Local dial-a-ride transit is provided by James River Public Transit for a $2.50 fare. Hours of operation are from 6:15am–6:00pm Monday-Thursday, 6:15am–7:00pm on Friday, 8:00am–6:00pm on Saturday, and 8:00am–1:00pm on Sunday.

== Notable people ==
- James Harvey Brown (1906–1995), Los Angeles City Council member and municipal court judge, born in Jamestown
- Anne Carlsen (1915–2002), nationally recognized educator, disability rights advocate, and psychologist who lived in Jamestown for 40 plus years and for whom the Anne Carlsen School and Center is named
- Alf Clausen, film and television score composer (The Simpsons)
- Edward P. J. Corbett, English professor at the Ohio State University, born in Jamestown
- William E. DePuy, U.S. Army general and first commander of TRADOC
- Alfred Dickey (1846–1901), first Lieutenant Governor of North Dakota
- Willis Downs, Philippine–American War era Medal of Honor recipient
- Roy S. Durstine (1886–1962), co-founder of BBDO advertising agency, born in Jamestown
- Darin Erstad, former Major League Baseball player
- Morris E. Fine, educator
- Michael John Fitzmaurice, a former United States Army soldier and a recipient of the United States military's highest decoration—the Medal of Honor—for his actions in the Vietnam War
- John Grabinger, North Dakota Senator
- Travis Hafner, former Major League Baseball player for the Cleveland Indians and New York Yankees
- Tom Hatten, television and radio personality and actor
- Richard Hieb, astronaut
- George W. Johnson, President of George Mason University (1979–1996)
- Anton Klaus, Mayor of Green Bay, Wisconsin
- John Knauf, justice of the North Dakota Supreme Court
- Louis L'Amour, author
- Peggy Lee, jazz singer and composer
- Lewis Marquardt, South Dakota state representative and educator
- Barbara McClintock, children's book illustrator
- Jim Ramstad, Minnesota politician
- Floyd Roberts, winner of 1938 Indianapolis 500
- Ronda Rousey, UFC Women's Bantamweight Champion & WWE Raw, SmackDown, and Tag Team Champion
- Myrna Sharlow, opera singer
- Rodney Stark, American sociologist of religion
- Shadoe Stevens, radio personality
- Mya Taylor, actress
- Charles F. Thompson, U.S. Army major general
- Harley Venton, actor
- Charles Lewis Camp, paleontologist and zoologist
