= WFKJ =

Coordinates: 39°52′59″N 77°20′43″W

- Cashtown, Pennsylvania; United States
- Broadcast area: Gettysburg metropolitan area
- Frequency: 890 kHz

Programming
- Language: English
- Format: Christian radio
- Affiliations: Cornerstone Radio; Moody Radio; Oasis Network; Salem Radio Network

Ownership
- Owner: Jesus Is Lord Ministries International

History
- First air date: December 12, 1988
- Call sign meaning: Working For King Jesus

Technical information
- Licensing authority: FCC
- Facility ID: 31102
- Class: D
- Power: 890 watts (days only)

Links
- Public license information: Public file; LMS
- Webcast: Listen live
- Website: www.jilmi.org/wfkj-radio

WFKJ is a Christian radio station licensed to Cashtown, Pennsylvania, broadcasting on 890 AM. The station which only operates during daytime hours serves Gettysburg metropolitan area and is owned by Jesus Is Lord Ministries International. WFKJ's programming consists of Christian talk and teaching along with Christian music, with a portion of its programming from the Oasis Radio Network.

By day, WFKJ is powered at 890 watts, using a non-directional antenna. But because 890 AM is a clear channel frequency reserved for Class A WLS in Chicago, WFKJ must sign off at night to avoid interference.
