= Vanessa Lynne Bryant =

American judge (born 1954)

Vanessa L. Bryant
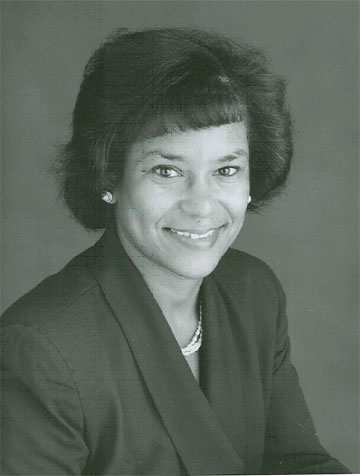

Senior Judge of the United States District Court for the District of Connecticut
- Incumbent
- Assumed office February 1, 2021

Judge of the United States District Court for the District of Connecticut
- In office April 2, 2007 – February 1, 2021
- Appointed by: George W. Bush
- Preceded by: Dominic J. Squatrito
- Succeeded by: Sarala Nagala

Judge of the Connecticut Superior Court
- In office September 1, 1998 – April 2, 2007
- Constituency: Criminal Division, Waterbury District (1998–2000); Criminal Division, Hartford District (1999–2001); Civil Division, New Britain District (2002–2003); Litchfield District (2003–2004); Civil Division, Hartford District (2004–2007)

Vice President and General Counsel of the Connecticut Housing Finance Authority
- In office May 1990 – June 1992
- Appointed by: William A. O'Neill

Personal details
- Born: Vanessa Lynne Bryant; January 27, 1954 (age 72) Queens, New York, U.S.
- Spouse: Tracy L. Rich
- Education: Howard University (BA); University of Connecticut (JD)

Vanessa Lynne Bryant (born January 27, 1954) is a senior United States district judge of the United States District Court for the District of Connecticut.

== Early life ==
Bryant was born in Queens, New York, and graduated from Howard University with her Bachelor of Arts degree in 1975 and later from University of Connecticut School of Law with a Juris Doctor in 1978.

== Career ==
From 1975 to 1976 she practiced law for the municipal government of Stamford, Connecticut. Bryant was in private practice at Day, Berry and Howard (presently Day Pitney) in Hartford, Connecticut, from 1978 to 1981. During the period from 1981 to 1989 she was a counsel to Aetna Life & Casualty Company and to Shawmut Bank from 1989 to 1990. She was Vice President and General Counsel to the Connecticut Housing Finance Authority from 1990 to 1992, and in 1991 joined the Connecticut Board of Pardons, which she stayed on until 1998. She was counsel to, and later a partner of, the New York-based law firm of Hawkins, Delafield and Wood from 1992 to 1998 and the chapter 13 bankruptcy trustee for the United States Bankruptcy Court for the District of Connecticut, Bridgeport division from 1996 until she was appointed a Connecticut Superior Court Judge on September 1, 1998.

=== State judicial service ===
In her capacity as a Superior Court Judge she served as Presiding Judge of the Civil Division of the New Britain Judicial District from 2002 to 2003, Administrative Judge for the Judicial District of Litchfield from 2003 to 2005 and Presiding Judge for the Civil Division of the Judicial District of Hartford from 2006 until her appointment to the United States District Court for the District of Connecticut. She was also presiding judge of the New Britain Judicial District from 2002 to 2004, and then the Hartford Judicial District from 2006 until her appointment as a federal judge in 2007. During her tenure as a State Court Judge, Judge Bryant received four judicial review complaints.

=== Federal judicial service ===
Bryant was first nominated to the U.S. District Court for the District of Connecticut on January 25, 2006, by President George W. Bush, though the Senate did not vote on her nomination. Bryant was the 38th person appointed a District Judge in Connecticut and the first African-American woman appointed a federal judge in New England. This nomination came despite majority opinions from the American Bar Association and the Connecticut Bar Association's federal judiciary committees, both of which found her "not qualified."

On January 9, 2007, President Bush once again nominated Bryant to the United States District Court for the District of Connecticut, a seat vacated by judge Dominic J. Squatrito. Following her re-nomination, the ABA committee issued a revised opinion, rating her as "qualified". Bryant was confirmed by the Senate on March 28, 2007, on a Senate vote and received her commission on April 2, 2007. She assumed senior status on February 1, 2021. On December 18, 2023, she announced her intention to assume inactive senior status on December 31, 2023.

Bryant oversaw a lawsuit filed by attorney Konstantine Kyros on behalf of over 60 former professional wrestlers against WWE which alleged that the company did not protect its employees from head trauma. She dismissed the lawsuit in September 2018.

== See also ==
- List of African-American federal judges
- List of African-American jurists

== Sources ==
- Confirmation hearing on the nominations of Michael Brunson Wallace to be U.S. circuit judge for the Fifth Circuit and Vanessa Lynne Bryant to be U.S. district judge for the District of Connecticut : hearing before the Committee on the Judiciary, United States Senate, One Hundred Ninth Congress, second session, September 26, 2006. 4.J 89/2:S.HRG.109-999

Legal offices
Preceded by Dominic J. Squatrito	Judge of the United States District Court for the District of Connecticut; 2007–2021	Succeeded by Sarala Nagala
