= KQDJ-FM =

- Valley City, North Dakota; United States
- Broadcast area: Jamestown-Valley City
- Frequency: 101.1 MHz
- Branding: Q101

Programming
- Format: Top 40 (CHR)

Ownership
- Owner: Ingstad Family Media; (IG3 Media, Inc.)
- Sister stations: KDAK, KDDR, KOVC, KQDJ, KQLX, KQLX-FM, KRVX, KXGT, KYNU

History
- Former call signs: KOVC-FM, KLPR

Technical information
- Licensing authority: FCC
- Facility ID: 60498
- Class: C1
- ERP: 100,000 watts
- HAAT: 197 meters (646 ft)
- Transmitter coordinates: 46°56′21″N 98°18′31.3″W

Links
- Public license information: Public file; LMS
- Webcast: Listen Live
- Website: newsdakota.com

KQDJ-FM (101.1 MHz, "Q101") is a radio station licensed to serve Valley City, North Dakota, serving the Jamestown and Valley City areas. The station is owned by Ingstad Family Media. It airs a Top 40 (CHR) music format.

The station was assigned the KQDJ-FM call letters by the Federal Communications Commission on November 1, 1996.

== History ==
Prior to 1996, KQDJ-FM was the sister station of KQDJ in Jamestown, North Dakota, and transmitted on the frequency of 95.5 MHz (now used by KYNU "Big Dog Country"). Known then as "J-Country" and owned by Sorenson Broadcasting, KQDJ-FM was a fully automated contemporary country station that occasionally broadcast live play-by-play of high school and the University of Jamestown sports events.

The station used four stereo reel-to-reel tape players to rotate music through a pre-programmed sequence of songs throughout the day. The system (affectionately known as "Chumley" by the announcers and engineers) was fairly reliable and included five AA-size Fidelipac commercial cart carousels that automatically inserted commercials at pre-programmed times plus two larger carts for announcing the time, one with odd minutes and one with even minutes. As a CBS Radio Network affiliate, national news was aired via satellite whereas both local news and weather were prerecorded by the AM station announcers and inserted into the automated program lineup. As a cost-saving measure, the station shared its operating hours with its AM counterpart so that the AM announcers could oversee and maintain the automated system including having the night shift AM announcers program "Chumley" for the next day.

The original studios were located on the corner of 1st Avenue South and 2nd Street SE in Jamestown on the second floor of the former White Drug Building and across the street from its regional competitors, KSJB and KSJZ. Both stations have since relocated.

In 1996, the station moved to 101.1 MHz and flipped to a hot adult contemporary format as "Q101", carrying programming from ABC's Today's Best Hits network. In 2007, the station began carrying Top 40 (CHR) formatted program Romeo's Playhouse in the evening and night hours, and Top 40 (CHR) formatted program Open House Party during the Saturday and Sunday evening and night hours. In July 2008, the station dropped the Today's Best Hits Hot AC network, which was its daytime programming, and flipped to a locally programmed Top 40 (CHR) format with syndicated The Kidd Kraddick Morning Show, keeping the "Q101" moniker.

In 2016, Q101 began a new local morning show called The Morning Rally with Warren and Kali. The new morning show was created to provide more local content.
