= Sarala Nagala =

American judge (born 1983)

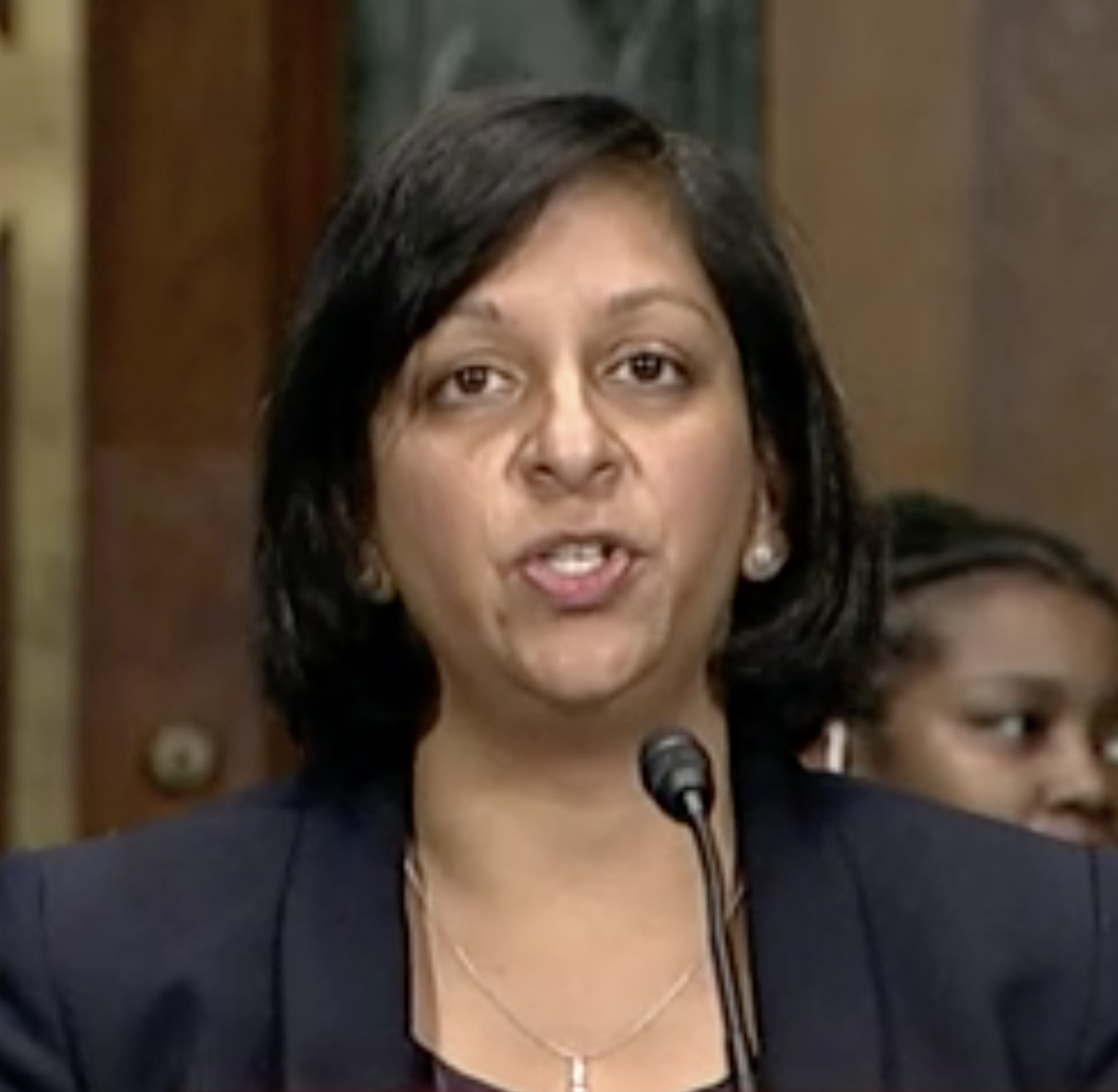

Judge of the United States District Court for the District of Connecticut
- Incumbent
- Assumed office November 2, 2021
- Appointed by: Joe Biden
- Preceded by: Vanessa Lynne Bryant

Personal details
- Born: 1983 (age 42–43) Oakes, North Dakota, U.S.
- Education: Stanford University (BA); University of California, Berkeley (JD)

Sarala Vidya Nagala (born 1983) is an American lawyer from Connecticut who is a United States district judge of the United States District Court for the District of Connecticut.

== Education ==
Nagala received her Bachelor of Arts from Stanford University in 2005 and her Juris Doctor from UC Berkeley School of Law in 2008.

== Career ==
She was a law clerk for Judge Susan P. Graber on the United States Court of Appeals for the Ninth Circuit from 2008 to 2009. She was an associate at Munger, Tolles & Olson in San Francisco from 2009 to 2012. She joined the U.S. Attorney's Office of Connecticut in 2012, where she served in a number of federal prosecutor roles, including Hate Crimes Coordinator and an assistant United States attorney. From 2017 to 2021, she was the deputy chief of the major crimes unit in the U.S. Attorney's Office in the District of Connecticut. From 2017 to 2019, she was a visiting clinical lecturer at Yale Law School.

=== Federal judicial service ===
On June 15, 2021, President Joe Biden nominated Nagala to serve as a United States district judge for the United States District Court for the District of Connecticut to the seat vacated by Judge Vanessa Lynne Bryant, who assumed senior status on February 1, 2021. On July 28, 2021, a hearing on her nomination was held before the Senate Judiciary Committee. On September 23, 2021, her nomination was reported out of committee by a 13–9 vote. On October 26, 2021, the United States Senate invoked cloture on her nomination by a 52–46 vote. On October 27, 2021, her nomination was confirmed by a 52–46 vote. She received her judicial commission on November 2, 2021. She was sworn in on November 3, 2021. She is the first judge of South Asian descent to serve on the District Court for the District of Connecticut.

== See also ==
- List of Asian American jurists

Legal offices
Preceded by Vanessa Lynne Bryant	Judge of the United States District Court for the District of Connecticut; 2021–present	Incumbent
