= KYWN =

Radio station in Boise, Idaho

- Meridian, Idaho; United States
- Broadcast area: Boise metropolitan area
- Frequency: 890 kHz
- Branding: La Perla

Programming
- Language: Spanish
- Format: Christian radio

Ownership
- Owner: Ambrocio Cruz; (Impacto Network, Inc.)

History
- First air date: April 1, 2003
- Former call signs: KQXI (2003–04); KDJQ (2004–12)

Technical information
- Licensing authority: FCC
- Facility ID: 129380
- Class: D
- Power: 50,000 watts (day); 125 watts (night)
- Transmitter coordinates: 43°27′37″N 116°14′29″W
- Translator: 104.7 K284CY (Meridian)

Links
- Public license information: Public file; LMS
- Website: facebook.com/laperla890

KYWN (890 AM) is a radio station licensed to Meridian, Idaho, and serving the Boise metropolitan area. It airs a Spanish-language Christian radio format and is owned by Impacto Network, Inc. It calls itself La Perla (The Pearl), using the slogan Alimente Su Alma (Feed Your Soul).

KYWN is a Class D station. By day, it broadcasts at the maximum power for AM stations, 50,000 watts. But at night, to protect WLS in Chicago, the dominant Class A station on 890 AM, it must greatly reduce power to 125 watts. It uses a non-directional antenna at all times. The transmitter is on Kuna Mora Road at Pleasant Valley Road in Kuna, Idaho.

== History ==
The station signed on the air on April 1, 2003. Its original call sign was KQXI. On June 10, 2004, the station changed its call letters to KDJQ and, on January 3, 2012, to KYWN. The station underwent financial difficulties and went dark for a time. KYWN returned to air on or around February 26, 2012.

According to Boise radio hobbyist Bill Frahm in the AMFMTVDX mailing list, KDJQ returned to the air briefly on May 16, 2009, in order to preserve its license. Frahm says the station is now owned by a bank. He said KDJQ had been silent since June 8, 2008, as it sought a new buyer.

As of January 18, 2012, Blue Turf Broadcasting, Inc. requested an extension of its Silent STA for KYWN after losing its night time transmitter site. On February 14, 2012, KYWN was given permission to operate special temporary authority (STA) due to the station no longer having access to its nighttime transmitter site and that the equipment at that site had been stolen. On September 19, 2012, KYWN told the U.S. Federal Communications Commission that "due to financial and staffing issues" it was requesting the authority to be off the air for 180 days.

At that time, programming included The Neal Boortz Radio Show, The Michael Smerconish Show, The Clark Howard Show and The Lars Larson National Radio Program. It was a network affiliate of CBS News Radio.

On December 16, 2013, the station's license was assigned to Ambrocio Cruz's Impacto Network, Inc. The purchase price for the transaction was $82,000.
