= KNDS-LP =

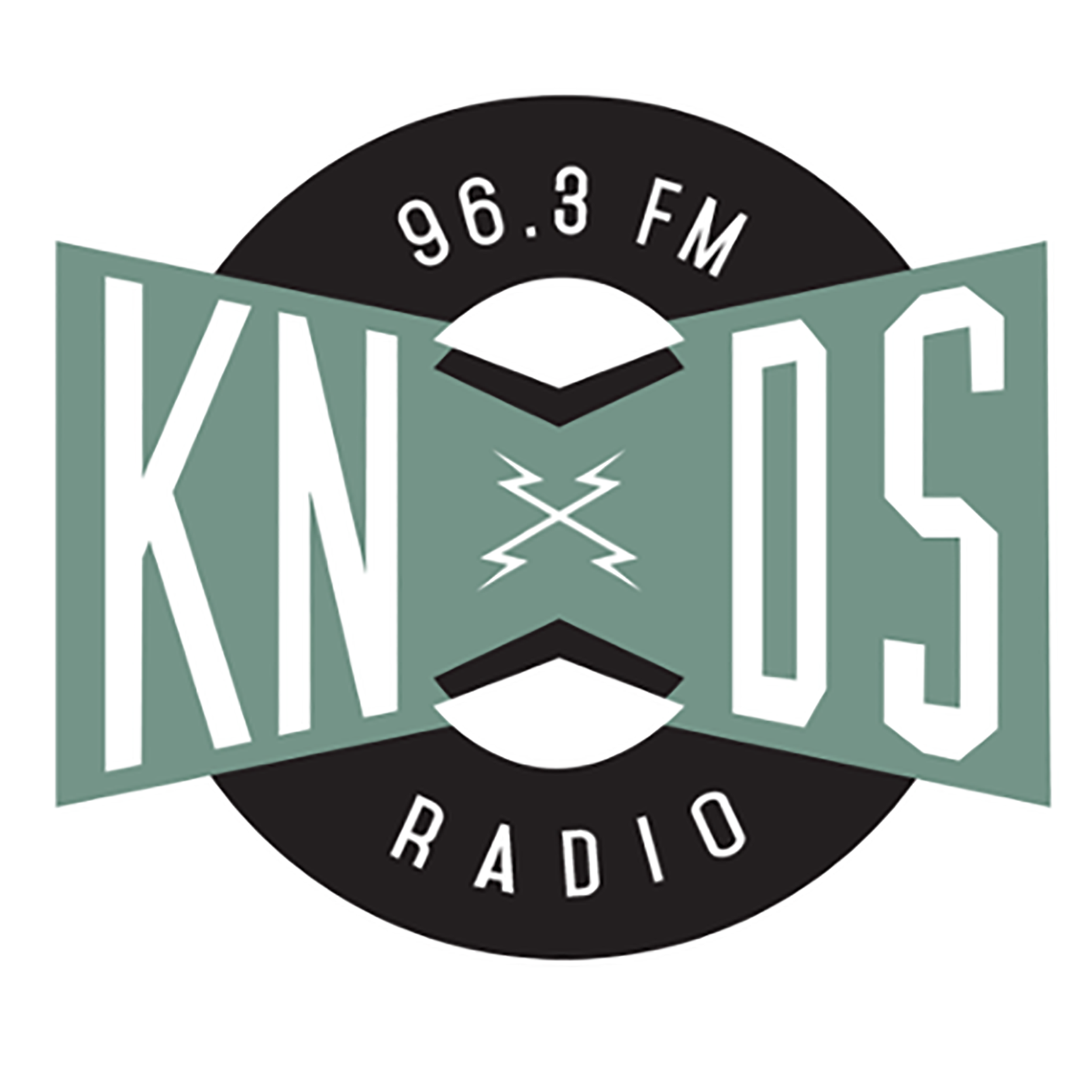
- Fargo, North Dakota; United States
- Broadcast area: Fargo-Moorhead
- Frequency: 96.3 MHz
- Branding: 96.3 KNDS Radio

Programming
- Format: College free-form radio

Ownership
- Owner: North Dakota State University; (Alliance for the Arts and Humanities)

History
- First air date: October 11, 2004
- Call sign meaning: North Dakota State

Technical information
- Licensing authority: FCC
- Facility ID: 133106
- Class: L1
- ERP: 100 watts
- HAAT: 28.2 meters
- Transmitter coordinates: 46°52′35.8″N 96°54′22.1″W

Links
- Public license information: LMS
- Webcast: Listen live
- Website: www.kndsradiofm.org

KNDS-LP is a low power radio station broadcasting on 96.3 FM in Fargo, North Dakota. The station is operated by the student broadcasting club at North Dakota State University (NDSU).

== History ==
In 1999, students at NDSU worked with professor Douglas Blanks Hindman to launch ThunderRadio, a Shoutcast web radio station, and apply for a low-power FM license. After Hindman left NDSU for a position at a university in Washington, Cloy Tobola, who was a doctoral student and graduate assistant at the time, took up the cause. With the help of Tobola and several students, KNDS came together. About the same time, a group affiliated with the Fargo Theatre (later known as Radio Free Fargo) organized to start a community-focused station. These groups combined their efforts and license applications.

In the summer of 2003, KNDS-LP was granted its original construction permit for a low power station by the Federal Communications Commission (FCC). Over the next year, Tobola worked with NDSU students and representatives of Radio Free Fargo to secure studio space, networking services, and equipment from the university, and to finalize operational roles for station managers. Because construction permits are only valid for one year, several short-term extensions were granted by the FCC. The last of these was issued on September 1, 2004; consequently, that date - and not the original 2003 date - appears on FCC records as the date of the construction permit.

Former logo of KNDS

The station marked its first FM broadcast at 11 am CDT, on October 11, 2004, under the direction of general manager Matthew Langemo. The FCC granted the station its broadcast license on August 29, 2005. In May 2007, KNDS moved frequency from 105.9 FM to 96.3 FM to prevent interference from KQLX-FM 106.1.

The original KNDS studio was on the east side of University Drive at Administration Avenue in Fargo. A small brick building there originally housed a U.S. Post Office substation in the south side of the building and a credit union in the north half of the building. When the credit union moved, NDSU made the space available for the first KNDS studio. The station moved in April 2014 to the lower level of the High Plains Reader building at 124 8th St. North in Fargo. The building that housed the original KNDS studios was demolished in 2016 to expand the nearby NDSU parking lot. The current studio is located in the Memorial Union on the NDSU campus.

== See also ==
- List of community radio stations in the United States
