= Dominic J. Squatrito =

American judge (1939–2021)

Senior Judge of the United States District Court for the District of Connecticut
- In office November 1, 2004 – January 20, 2021

Judge of the United States District Court for the District of Connecticut
- In office October 7, 1994 – November 1, 2004
- Appointed by: Bill Clinton
- Preceded by: Seat established by 104 Stat. 5089
- Succeeded by: Vanessa Lynne Bryant

Personal details
- Born: Dominic James Squatrito; April 9, 1939 Hartford, Connecticut, U.S.
- Died: January 20, 2021 (aged 81) Manchester, Connecticut, U.S.
- Education: Wesleyan University (B.A.); Yale Law School (LL.B.)

Dominic James Squatrito (April 9, 1939 – January 20, 2021) was a United States district judge of the United States District Court for the District of Connecticut from 1994 to 2004.

== Education and career ==
Born in Hartford, Connecticut, Squatrito received a Bachelor of Arts degree from Wesleyan University in 1961 and a Bachelor of Laws from Yale Law School in 1965. He was a Fulbright scholar to the University of Florence, Florence, Italy in 1962. He was in private practice of law in Manchester, Connecticut from 1966 to 1994, and was a counsel to the Town of Manchester Housing Authority from 1972 to 1979, and to the Connecticut State Legislature Judiciary Committee from 1974 to 1975. He was a clerk for the Connecticut State Committee on Executive Nominations from 1974 to 1978, and chief counsel of the Connecticut Senate from 1976 to 1980.

== Federal judicial service ==
On July 28, 1994, Squatrito was nominated by President Bill Clinton to a new seat on the United States District Court for the District of Connecticut created by 104 Stat. 5089. He was confirmed by the United States Senate on October 6, 1994, and received his commission the following day. He assumed senior status on November 1, 2004 due to a certified disability.

He died on January 20, 2021, at age 82, in Manchester, Connecticut.

== General and cited references ==
Legal offices
Preceded by Seat established by 104 Stat. 5089	Judge of the United States District Court for the District of Connecticut; 1994–2004	Succeeded by Vanessa Lynne Bryant
