= Oakes, North Dakota =

Oakes
- City
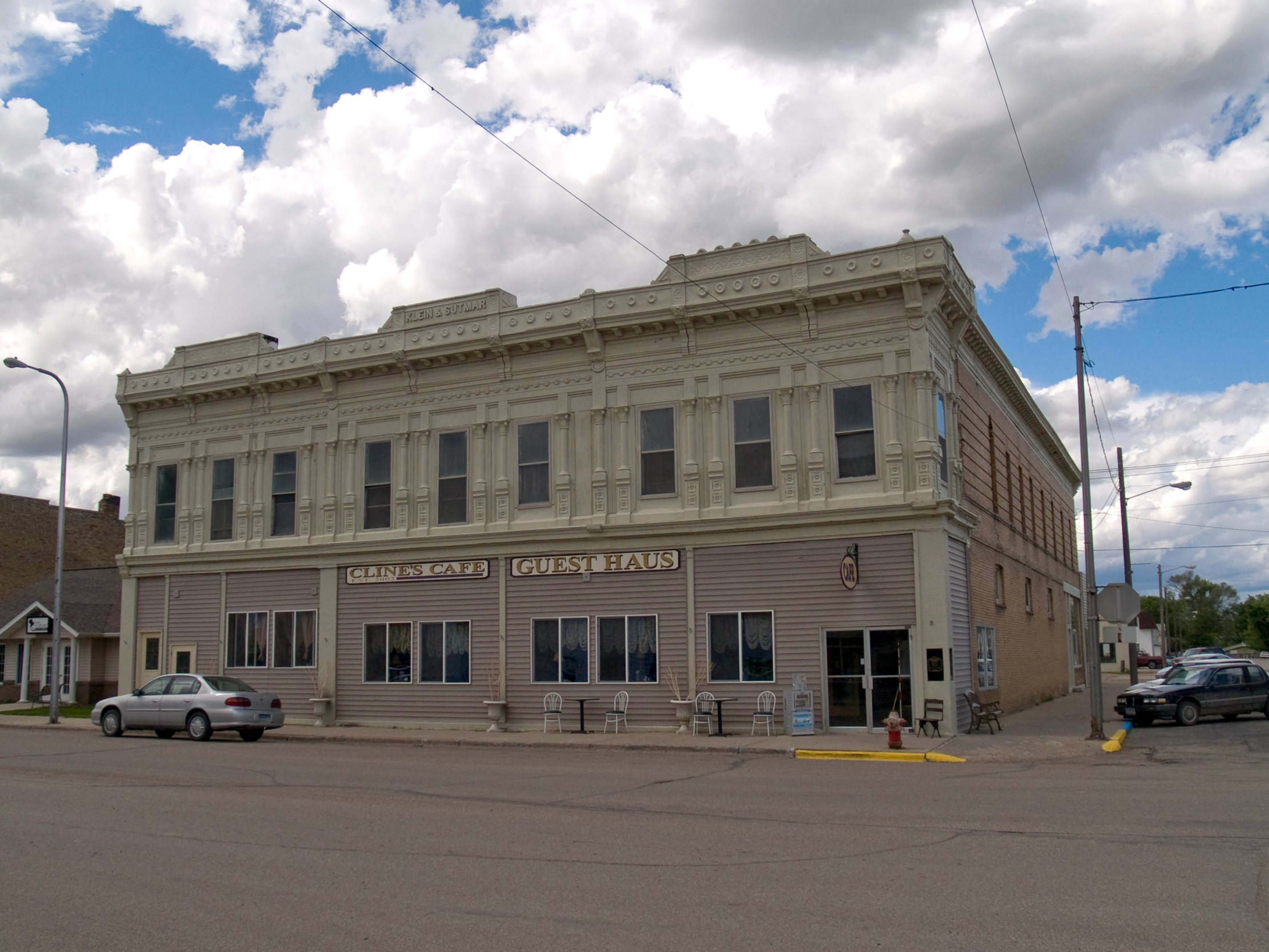
- The Klein and Sutmar Block on Main Avenue in Oakes

- Icon

- Location of Oakes, North Dakota
- Coordinates: 46°08′23″N 98°05′14″W
- Country: United States
- State: North Dakota
- County: Dickey
- Founded: 1886

Government
  - Mayor: Nathan O'Brien

Area
  - Total: 1.56 sq mi (4.05 km^{2})
  - Land: 1.56 sq mi (4.05 km^{2})
  - Water: 0 sq mi (0.00 km^{2})
- Elevation: 1,300 ft (400 m)

Population (2020)
  - Total: 1,798
  - Estimate (2022): 1,767
  - Density: 1,149.3/sq mi (443.73/km^{2})
- Time zone: UTC-6 (Central (CST))
  - Summer (DST): UTC-5 (CDT)
- ZIP code: 58474
- Area code: 701
- FIPS code: 38-58740
- GNIS feature ID: 1036205
- Highways: ND 1, ND 11
- Website: oakesnd.com

Oakes is the most populous city in Dickey County, North Dakota, United States. The population was 1,798 at the 2020 census. Oakes was founded in 1886.

== History ==
Oakes was laid out in 1886. It was named for Thomas Fletcher Oakes, a railroad official. A post office has been in operation in Oakes since 1886. The city was incorporated in 1888.

== Geography ==
Oakes sits approximately one mile east of the James River and is the meeting place of several rail lines. Because of its rail access, Oakes is home to several major grain elevators that handle large volumes of grain, primarily corn.

According to the United States Census Bureau, the city has a total area of 1.56 square miles (4.04 km^{2}), all land.

== Demographics ==
Historical population
Census	Pop.	Note	%±
1890	379		—
1900	668		76.3%
1910	1,499		124.4%
1920	1,637		9.2%
1930	1,709		4.4%
1940	1,665		−2.6%
1950	1,774		6.5%
1960	1,650		−7.0%
1970	1,742		5.6%
1980	2,112		21.2%
1990	1,775		−16.0%
2000	1,979		11.5%
2010	1,856		−6.2%
2020	1,798		−3.1%
2022 (est.)	1,767		−1.7%
U.S. Decennial Census; 2020 Census

=== 2020 census ===
Oakes racial composition
Race	Number	Percent
White	1,650	91.77%
Black or African American	6	0.33%
Native American	6	0.33%
Asian	12	0.67%
Pacific Islander	0	0.0%
Other/Mixed	124	6.9%
Hispanic or Latino	119	6.62%

As of the census of 2020, there were 1,798 people, 849 households, and 510 families living in the city. The population density was 1,152.56 inhabitants per square mile (445.01/km^{2}). There were 875 housing units at an average density of 580.9 units per square mile (216.56/km^{2}).

=== 2010 census ===
As of the census of 2010, there were 1,856 people, 807 households, and 476 families living in the city. The population density was 1,131.7 inhabitants per square mile (437.0/km^{2}). There were 912 housing units at an average density of 556.1 per square mile (214.7/km^{2}). The racial makeup of the city was 96.1% White, 0.5% African American, 0.3% Native American, 0.8% Asian, 1.1% from other races, and 1.3% from two or more races. Hispanic or Latino of any race were 3.8% of the population.

There were 807 households, of which 26.8% had children under the age of 18 living with them, 51.2% were married couples living together, 4.5% had a female householder with no husband present, 3.3% had a male householder with no wife present, and 41.0% were non-families. 36.9% of all households were made up of individuals, and 19.4% had someone living alone who was 65 years of age or older. The average household size was 2.19 and the average family size was 2.89.

The median age in the city was 45.7 years. 23% of residents were under the age of 18; 6% were between the ages of 18 and 24; 20.2% were from 25 to 44; 26.7% were from 45 to 64; and 24.1% were 65 years of age or older. The gender makeup of the city was 48.1% male and 51.9% female.

=== 2000 census ===
As of the census of 2000, there were 1,979 people, 828 households, and 495 families living in the city. The population density was 1,203.0 inhabitants per square mile (464.5/km^{2}). There were 908 housing units at an average density of 552.0 per square mile (213.1/km^{2}). The racial makeup of the city was 97.27% White, 0.20% Native American, 1.01% Asian, 1.01% from other races, and 0.51% from two or more races. Hispanic or Latino of any race were 2.58% of the population.

There were 828 households, out of which 27.7% had children under the age of 18 living with them, 51.2% were married couples living together, 5.2% had a female householder with no husband present, and 40.2% were non-families. 36.7% of all households were made up of individuals, and 20.0% had someone living alone who was 65 years of age or older. The average household size was 2.28 and the average family size was 3.02.

In the city, the population was spread out, with 24.8% under the age of 18, 6.6% from 18 to 24, 23.0% from 25 to 44, 21.0% from 45 to 64, and 24.5% who were 65 years of age or older. The median age was 42 years. For every 100 females, there were 93.5 males. For every 100 females age 18 and over, there were 87.2 males.

The median income for a household in the city was $30,263, and the median income for a family was $39,625. Males had a median income of $29,135 versus $15,611 for females. The per capita income for the city was $17,138. About 6.3% of families and 8.8% of the population were below the poverty line, including 10.4% of those under age 18 and 11.0% of those age 65 or over.

== Education ==
Oakes has two schools, including Oakes Public School and Oakes High School. Oakes Public School provides pre-school and grades K–6. Oakes High School provides grades 7–12. The athletic teams of Oakes High School are called the Tornadoes, replacing the old name the Golden Tornadoes. The current school colors are orange, black, and white.

== Notable people ==
- Phil Hansen, defensive end with the Buffalo Bills
- Thomas F. Marshall, U.S. representative from North Dakota
- Stuart B. Munsch, U.S. Navy admiral
- Sarala Nagala, U.S. district judge from Connecticut

== Local media ==
=== AM Radio ===
AM radio stations
Frequency	Call sign	Name	Format	Owner	City
1220 AM	KDDR	Full Service (radio format)/Country	i3G Media	Oakes	

=== FM Radio ===
FM radio stations
Frequency	Call sign	Name	Format	Owner	City
95.9 FM	KDDR	KDDR	Full Service (radio format)/Country	i3G Media	Oakes

== Parks ==
=== J. Paul Klinger Park ===
J. Paul Klinger Park is located just southwest of the pool. The park has a roofed shelter with seating and tables. Klinger Park also has a beach volleyball court, a picnic area, and a playground that includes a slide, swings, tire swing, tunnel tubes, rock wall, and a rope wall.

=== Softball Complex ===
The Oakes softball complex has three softball diamonds, a playground, a two-hole Frisbee golf course, and a concessions stand.

== Climate ==
This climatic region is typified by large seasonal temperature differences, with warm to hot (and often humid) summers and cold (sometimes severely cold) winters. According to the Köppen Climate Classification system, Oakes has a humid continental climate, abbreviated "Dfb" on climate maps.
