= WBAJ =

- Blythewood, South Carolina; United States
- Broadcast area: Columbia metropolitan area
- Frequency: 890 kHz
- Branding: Columbia Christian Talk Radio

Programming
- Format: Christian radio

Ownership
- Owner: Bible Clarity

History
- First air date: 1999
- Call sign meaning: We Broadcast About Jesus

Technical information
- Licensing authority: FCC
- Facility ID: 41504
- Class: D
- Power: 50,000 watts (days only); 8,500 watts (critical hours)
- Transmitter coordinates: 34°06′31″N 81°04′28″W
- Translator: 101.7 W269DU (Columbia)

Links
- Public license information: Public file; LMS
- Website: wbaj.org

WBAJ (890 AM) is a radio station licensed to Blythewood, South Carolina, and serving the Columbia metropolitan area during the daytime hours only. Broadcasting under the on-air name Columbia Christian Talk Radio, WBAJ carries a Christian radio format and is licensed to Bible Clarity.

WBAJ is also heard on low-power FM translator W269DU, broadcasting at 101.7 MHz in Columbia.

== History ==
On October 8, 1999, the station signed on with its Christian talk radio format and added it's translator at full power in 2019.
