= KRVX =

- Wimbledon, North Dakota; United States
- Broadcast area: Jamestown-Valley City
- Frequency: 103.1 MHz (HD Radio)
- Branding: 103.1 The Raven

Programming
- Format: Classic rock
- Subchannels: HD2: Classic hits "Ted FM"; HD3: Ag News/Talk (KQLX simulcast)

Ownership
- Owner: Ingstad Family Media; (i3G Media, Inc.)
- Sister stations: KDAK, KDDR, KOVC, KQDJ, KQDJ-FM, KQLX, KQLX-FM, KXGT, KYNU

History
- First air date: 2005
- Call sign meaning: K RaVen X

Technical information
- Facility ID: 164198
- Class: C1
- ERP: 99,000 watts
- HAAT: 144 meters (472 ft)
- Transmitter coordinates: 46°56′21″N 98°18′31.3″W
- Translators: HD2: 97.1 K246AM (Jamestown); HD2: 102.7 K274BH (Valley City)

Links
- Webcast: Listen Live; Listen Live (HD2)
- Website: NewsDakota.com

KRVX (103.1 FM, "103.1 The Raven") is a radio station licensed to Wimbledon, North Dakota, serving the Jamestown and Valley City area. The station is owned by Ingstad Family Media, through licensee Two Rivers Broadcasting, Inc. Positioned as "North Dakota's Classic Rock," KRVX airs a classic rock music format.

KRVX studios are co-located with its sister stations KQDJ, KQDJ-FM, and KYNU on 2625 8th Ave SW in Jamestown while the stations’ transmitter site is located in Eckelson.

The station was assigned the callsign KRVX by the Federal Communications Commission on July 7, 2005.

== KRVX-HD2 ==
In February 2018 KRVX launched a classic hits format on its HD2 subchannel, branded as "Ted FM" (format moved from KXGT 98.3 FM Carrington, which switched to classic country).

=== Translators ===
Broadcast translators for KRVX-HD2
Call sign	Frequency	City of license	FID	ERP (W)	HAAT	Class	Transmitter coordinates	FCC info
K246AM	97.1 FM	Jamestown, North Dakota	141985	250	27 m (89 ft)	D	46°52′47″N 98°43′5.4″W	LMS
K274BH	102.7 FM	Valley City, North Dakota	141988	250	20.1 m (66 ft)	D	46°56′6.9″N 98°0′43.3″W	LMS
