= KDDR =

- Oakes, North Dakota; United States
- Broadcast area: Southeastern North Dakota
- Frequency: 1220 kHz
- Branding: The Tornado 1220 AM 95.9 FM 100.3 FM

Programming
- Language: English
- Format: Country
- Affiliations: Fox News Radio

Ownership
- Owner: Ingstad Family Media; (I3G Media, Inc.)
- Sister stations: KDAK, KOVC, KQLX, KQLX-FM, KQDJ, KQDJ-FM, KRVX, KXGT, KYNU

History
- First air date: July 31, 1959

Technical information
- Licensing authority: FCC
- Facility ID: 60499
- Class: B
- Power: 1,000 watts day 327 watts night
- Transmitter coordinates: 46°7′23″N 98°5′21″W
- Translators: 95.9 K240CJ (Oakes); 100.3 K262DH (Oakes)

Links
- Public license information: Public file; LMS
- Webcast: Listen Live
- Website: newsdakota.com

KDDR (1220 AM, "The Tornado") is a radio station licensed to Oakes, North Dakota. The station is owned by Todd Ingstad and Tallie Colville, through licensee i3G Media, Inc., with a country music format throughout the day, and is Southeastern North Dakota's sports leader, as an affiliate of the Minnesota Twins, Minnesota Vikings, Minnesota Timberwolves and North Dakota State Bison football radio networks, and more than 100 high school sporting events a year, including High School Football, Basketball, Baseball, Volleyball, Wrestling and American Legion Baseball.

KDDR was honored more than 30 times between 2012 and 2018 by the North Dakota Broadcasters Association, Associated Press, and Midwest Broadcast Journalism Association; primarily for excellence in local sports coverage.

For many years, KDDR was a part of the Dakota County Radio Network, which featured programming primarily carried from KOVC in Valley City, North Dakota, and simulcast on KDAK in Carrington, North Dakota. On February 1, 2018, KDDR was rebranded as "The Tornado", with a deeper focus on the Oakes and surrounding areas, and the 'Dakota County' branding was officially retired.

The station was assigned the KDDR call letters by the Federal Communications Commission.

Logo before 100.3 translator sign on

== History ==
=== Early years ===
KDDR's early transmitter facilities were tied to a June 11, 1959, lease between Robert J. and Wanda C. Johnson and Interstate Broadcasting Corporation for a four-acre tract about one mile south of Oakes. The tract was used as the station's transmitter-tower site, with the original lease running through May 31, 1979, at $10 per month. The lease was recorded in Dickey County in 1965. Interstate Broadcasting assigned the lease to Farm States Radio Company of Mobridge, South Dakota, on June 30, 1964, and Farm States assigned it to Berry-Iverson Company of North Dakota on December 31, 1972. In a 1976 decision involving the tower-site lease, the North Dakota Supreme Court described Berry-Iverson as the company that owned and operated KDDR at Oakes.

=== Berry-Iverson and Frontier Broadcasting ===
In 1976, Berry-Iverson Broadcasting Company agreed to sell KDDR to Frontier Broadcasting for $100,000. Broadcasting reported that KDDR was then a 1,000-watt daytime station on 1220 kHz. Frontier Broadcasting was owned by Timothy Branson and Robert Norlund, who were also involved in ambulance-service businesses in Wadena and Alexandria, Minnesota. The FCC Broadcast Bureau granted the assignment of KDDR's license from Berry-Iverson Company of North Dakota to Frontier Broadcasting on July 23, 1976.

=== KDDR and KDDR-FM ===
By the late 1980s, KDDR was associated with KDDR-FM, then licensed to Oakes. In 1989, The M Street Journal listed KDDR on 1220 AM as a country station and showed KDDR-FM at 92.3 FM, also associated with country programming through the Satellite Music Network. Trade listings from the period show that the FM station's relationship with the AM changed more than once: FMedia! reported in 1989 that KDDR-FM was no longer simulcasting the AM station, while a 1991 listing reported KDDR-FM, then moving from 92.3 to 92.5 MHz, as again simulcasting KDDR's country programming.

In 1989, the FCC approved the substitution of channel 223C1, 92.5 MHz, for channel 222C2, 92.3 MHz, at Oakes and modified KDDR-FM's license accordingly. KDDR-FM later became a separate facility from KDDR AM.

=== Ingstad ownership ===
In 1993, the FCC granted the assignment of KDDR's license from CERM Broadcasting Corporation to James D. Ingstad for $85,000. At the time, the station was listed as operating on 1220 kHz with 1,000 watts daytime and 327 watts nighttime. In 1994, The M Street Journal reported a proposed assignment of KDDR, along with KOVC and KQDJ-FM in Valley City, from James D. Ingstad to Sioux Valley Broadcasting Company.

KDDR remained under Sioux Valley Broadcasting Company in later FCC records. In 2013, the FCC granted Sioux Valley Broadcasting Company's license-renewal application for KDDR, facility ID 60499, at Oakes on 1220 kHz. After the death of Janice M. Ingstad, FCC notices recorded the transfer of control of Sioux Valley Broadcasting Company interests first to her estate and then, in 2017, to Robert J. Ingstad, Tallie Colville and Todd Ingstad.

=== The Tornado ===
By 2018, KDDR was identifying on-air as "The Tornado". A NewsDakota sports report from August 2018 promoted game coverage on "The Tornado KDDR-AM 1220/95.9 FM" and NewsDakota.com. The station emphasized local sports coverage, especially Oakes-area high school athletics. In 2019, NewsDakota reported that KDDR had received two Eric Sevareid Awards from the Midwest Broadcast Journalists Association: a first-place award in the small-market radio sportscast/program category for coverage following LaMoure's Babe Ruth baseball state championship, and an award of merit in small-market radio sports play-by-play for coverage of an Oakes High School football victory over Richland. NewsDakota reported that, by that point, KDDR had received 11 Sevareid Awards since 2014, all for sports broadcasting.

KDDR's programming has also been distributed on FM translators. K240CJ on 95.9 MHz originally relayed KDDR in Oakes, but in 2022 the FCC approved i3G Media's plan to move the translator to LaMoure after a new Oakes translator, K262DH on 100.3 MHz, signed on to relay KDDR. NorthPine later reported that K240CJ had returned to the air from LaMoure while continuing to relay KDDR.

As of current NorthPine listings, KDDR operates on 1220 AM in Oakes with 1,000 watts daytime and 327 watts nighttime, is owned by i3G Media, airs a country format as "The Tornado", and is paired with translator K262DH at 100.3 FM in Oakes and K240CJ at 95.9 FM in LaMoure. The listing also identifies KDDR as a Minnesota Twins affiliate. NewsDakota's website lists KDDR "The Tornado" with a live stream and a KDDR Tornado podcast page carrying local sports and news content.
