= KQDJ (AM) =

- Jamestown, North Dakota; United States
- Frequency: 1400 kHz
- Branding: Jamestown 107.1

Programming
- Format: Soft adult contemporary
- Affiliations: Minnesota Twins

Ownership
- Owner: i3G Media
- Sister stations: KDAK, KDDR, KOVC, KQDJ-FM, KQLX, KQLX-FM, KRVX, KXGT, KYNU

History
- First air date: 1953 (as KEYJ)
- Former call signs: KEYJ (1953–August 1, 1979)

Technical information
- Licensing authority: FCC
- Facility ID: 68626
- Class: C
- Power: 1,000 watts unlimited
- Translator: 107.1 K296HH (Jamestown)

Links
- Public license information: Public file; LMS
- Webcast: Listen Live
- Website: newsdakota.com

KQDJ (1400 kHz) is an AM radio station located in Jamestown, North Dakota. The station is also heard on FM via translator K296HH on 107.1 MHz. A 1,000-watt station, with a range of about 40 miles (64 km) under average conditions, KQDJ has served the Stutsman County area under various identities since 1953. KQDJ currently carries a soft adult contemporary format. The station previously carried classic hits format from 2012-2013, the Dakota County Radio network from 2013-2014. On June 2, 2014 KQDJ flipped to ESPN Radio format and re-branded to ESPN Jamestown. KQKD has been affiliated with Fox Sports Radio and a nostalgia format before that, playing music from the 1930s, 1940s, and 1950s.

KQDJ is the radio home of the University of Jamestown Jimmies and Jamestown High Blue Jays.

== History ==
In 1953, radio station KEYJ went on the air. The station's express mission was to serve the Jamestown community (the other local station, KSJB, had developed into a regional station that didn't adequately serve its home city), providing news, sports and market coverage to the city of Jamestown and its immediate environs. For many years, from the mid-1950s until the 1980s, the two competing stations were located directly across the street from each other, each on the second floor of a downtown retail building. In a small market such as Jamestown, without a surplus of radio air talent, it was common for announcers to work different shifts at the two stations, but utilizing a different air name and persona at each one.

KEYJ was originally part of the "KEY" network of radio stations, located throughout the Dakotas, all having "K-E-Y" as the first three letters of their callsign ("KEYZ" in Williston, North Dakota; "KEYA" in Belcort, North Dakota; etc.). The stations were owned by the Ingstad brothers from 1953 until 1969, when KEYJ was sold to its longtime station manager.

KEYJ gained brief fame in 1957, when it was featured in Life Magazine, as the home of the "World's Youngest D-J"; the now world-famous Shadoe Stevens.

KEYJ Incorporated (and its president, Robert L. Richardson) owned and ran the station until 1979, when Richardson sold the operation to Great West Broadcasting. On August 1, 1979, station changed its callsign to KQDJ. Great West was a short-lived operation that lasted only two years. Afterwards, the station went through several owners, eventually winding up back in the Ingstad chain.

In July 2020, KQDJ changed formats from sports to soft adult contemporary, branded as "Jamestown 107.1".

== Alumni ==
Richardson considered part of his original mission to be helping teach young people from the community how to work in broadcasting. To that end, he made a point of hiring students from the local high school and Jamestown College to work at the station.

Among the many broadcasters who started at KEYJ/KQDJ were:

- Shadoe Stevens (real name: Terry Ingstad), world-famous DJ and announcer
- Dick Ingstad (brother of Terry/Shadow), syndicated morning host
- Dan Dean Dewald, KZGF—Grand Forks, North Dakota (overnights)
- Dick Shaarf
- Mitch Berg, host of the Northern Alliance Radio Network at WWTC radio in the Twin Cities
- Dave Howey, KPRW—Perham, Minnesota (mornings and operations manager)
- And Richards (deejayed as Van Andrews), Singer/Songwriter
- Mark Swartzell later KOMA—Oklahoma City; WMET—Chicago; KFYR—Bismarck and the Dakota News Network.
- Mick Wagner later WWTC—Minneapolis (as "King Kracker"); and KMHD—Portland, Oregon.

== Previous logo ==
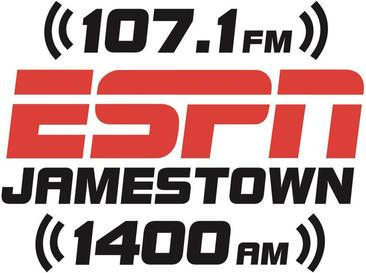

== FM translator ==
Call sign	Frequency	City of license	FID	ERP (W)	HAAT	Class	Transmitter coordinates	FCC info
K296HH	107.1 FM	Jamestown, North Dakota	200073	250	27 m (89 ft)	D	46°52′47″N 98°43′5.4″W	LMS
