= WKNV =

- Fairlawn, Virginia; United States
- Broadcast area: Blacksburg, Virginia; Christiansburg, Virginia
- Frequency: 890 kHz
- Branding: Joy FM

Programming
- Format: Southern Gospel

Ownership
- Owner: Positive Alternative Radio, Inc.

History
- First air date: 1998
- Former call signs: WGHK (1990–1990); WCQR (1990–1995); WKNV (1995–Present)

Technical information
- Licensing authority: FCC
- Facility ID: 53106
- Class: D
- Power: 10,000 watts day
- Transmitter coordinates: 37°7′55.0″N 80°37′7.0″W
- Translators: 94.3 W232CS (Christiansburg); 102.3 W272EA (Fairlawn)

Links
- Public license information: Public file; LMS
- Webcast: Listen Live
- Website: joyfm.org

WKNV (890 AM) is a Southern Gospel formatted broadcast radio station licensed to Fairlawn, Virginia, serving Blacksburg and Christiansburg in Virginia. WKNV is owned by Positive Alternative Radio, Inc.

Former logo
