= KDAK =

- Carrington, North Dakota; United States
- Frequency: 1600 kHz
- Branding: The Cardinal

Programming
- Format: Classic hits
- Affiliations: Fox News Radio; Westwood One; Minnesota Timberwolves; Minnesota Vikings

Ownership
- Owner: Ingstad Family Media (i3G Media); (Two Rivers Broadcasting)
- Sister stations: KDDR, KOVC, KQDJ, KQDJ-FM, KQLX, KQLX-FM, KRVX, KXGT, KYNU

History
- First air date: 1962
- Call sign meaning: DAKota

Technical information
- Licensing authority: FCC
- Facility ID: 68632
- Class: D
- Power: 500 watts day 90 watts night
- Translator: 100.1 K261EW (Carrington)

Links
- Public license information: Public file; LMS
- Webcast: Listen Live
- Website: NewsDakota.com

KDAK (1600 AM) is a radio station licensed to serve Carrington, North Dakota. The station is owned by Ingstad Family Media. KDAK airs a classic hits format and covers local sports, including the Carrington Cardinals, New Rockford-Sheyenne Rockets and New Rockford Blacksox.

== History ==
KDAK was developed in 1961 as a new AM radio station for Carrington, North Dakota. Before the station signed on, Broadcasting reported in July 1961 that Roy W. Gunderson, previously an announcer-air personality at KIMN in Denver, had been named general manager of KDAK and that the station was expected to go on the air that fall. In October 1961, Broadcasting reported that the station's construction permit was being assigned from Judson D. Tracy, F. W. Carr, and Claire Ihringer, each one-third partners doing business as Central Broadcasting Co., to a newly incorporated Central Broadcasting Co. made up of the same principals; no financial consideration was involved.

A local Foster County centennial history account states that KDAK, operating under the name Central Broadcasting, Inc. and using the slogan "Top of the Dial", went on the air on October 16, 1961. By April 1962, Broadcasting described KDAK as a "new daytimer" serving a central North Dakota market in a classified advertisement seeking a salesman for the station under Gunderson as general manager.

In 1967, the Federal Communications Commission directed Central Broadcasting Co., then licensee of KDAK, to pay a $500 forfeiture for failing to have a properly licensed operator on duty.

By the mid-1980s, KDAK was paired with an FM sister station. In March 1985, Broadcasting reported that KDAK-AM-FM, consisting of KDAK at 1600 kHz with 500 watts daytime and KDAK-FM at 92.7 MHz with 3 kW, sought assignment of license from Carrington Broadcasting Inc. to Randall L. Christenson and his wife, Roxann, for assumption of liabilities. The seller was owned by Dennis J. Stramer and Perry Kugler, while the Christensons were listed as having no other broadcast interests.

In 1994, The M Street Journal listed a proposed transfer of KDAK from Randall and Roxann Christensen to Two Rivers Broadcasting. The FCC later listed KDAK, facility ID 68632, as licensed to Two Rivers Broadcasting, Inc.; in 2013, the commission granted renewal of license for KDAK to Two Rivers Broadcasting.

In 2017, the FCC accepted for filing an involuntary transfer of control of KDAK from Janice M. Ingstad, deceased, to the Estate of Janice M. Ingstad, with Tanya Ingstad Knudson as personal representative. The FCC granted a subsequent voluntary transfer of control, as amended, from the Estate of Janice M. Ingstad to Robert J. Ingstad, Tallie Colville, and Todd Ingstad, with condition, in actions released January 2, 2018.

In early 2018, KDAK changed format. NorthPine reported that KDAK dropped the agriculture-intensive "Dakota Country Radio" format, which had originated at KOVC in Valley City, and began carrying classic hits as "The Cardinal". At the time of the change, KDAK held a construction permit for FM translator K261EW at 100.1 MHz in Carrington, though NorthPine reported that the translator did not yet appear to be on the air. NorthPine had separately listed K261EW among FM translators granted for AM revitalization purposes in January 2018.

The FCC granted renewal of license for both KDAK and translator K261EW to i3G Media, Inc. on March 22, 2021. NorthPine lists KDAK as a 500-watt daytime and 90-watt nighttime AM station carrying classic hits as "The Cardinal", with K261EW at 100.1 MHz as its 250-watt FM translator; the listing also notes Minnesota Twins programming on both signals.

KDAK has continued to emphasize local service for Carrington and the surrounding area. The station's app listing describes KDAK AM 1600/100.1 FM as "The Cardinal", providing local news, weather and sports, and as a full-service heritage AM station locally owned and operated by i3G Media. In 2024, News Dakota announced that B. J. Walters had been hired as morning announcer for KDAK AM 1600/100.1 FM and as the primary play-by-play announcer for Carrington baseball, softball, football, volleyball and basketball; the same report described i3G Media as a family-owned company headquartered in Valley City, North Dakota, operating stations across east-central North Dakota, western Minnesota and eastern South Dakota.

== FM translator ==
Call sign	Frequency	City of license	FID	ERP (W)	HAAT	Class	Transmitter coordinates	FCC info
K261EW	100.1 FM	Carrington, North Dakota	200072	250	48 m (157 ft)	D	47°25′42.9″N 99°5′4.4″W	LMS
