= KYNU =

- Jamestown, North Dakota; United States
- Broadcast area: Jamestown-Valley City
- Frequency: 95.5 MHz
- Branding: Big Dog 95.5

Programming
- Format: Country

Ownership
- Owner: Ingstad Family Media; (i3G Media, Inc.)
- Sister stations: KDAK, KDDR, KOVC, KQDJ, KQDJ-FM, KQLX, KQLX-FM, KRVX, KXGT

History
- Former call signs: KGWB (1981–1982); KQDJ-FM (1982–1993); KYNU (1993–1996); KXGT (1996–2005)

Technical information
- Licensing authority: FCC
- Facility ID: 68627
- Class: C1
- ERP: 100,000 watts
- HAAT: 197 meters (646 ft)
- Transmitter coordinates: 46°56′21″N 98°18′31.3″W

Links
- Public license information: Public file; LMS
- Webcast: Listen Live
- Website: newsdakota.com

KYNU (95.5 FM, "Big Dog 95.5") is a radio station licensed to serve Jamestown, North Dakota. The station is owned by i3G media. It airs a country music format.

The station was assigned the callsign KYNU by the Federal Communications Commission on October 20, 2005.

== History ==
The 95.5 MHz facility in Jamestown originated as FCC facility ID 68627. FCCInfo's application record lists construction permit BPH-19791128AE as granted on October 10, 1980, and the FCC call-sign history for the facility traces the station from KGWB, beginning September 25, 1981, to KQDJ-FM, beginning March 1, 1982.

The station changed call signs from KQDJ-FM to KYNU on May 1, 1993. A 1993 issue of FMedia! listed the Jamestown station on 95.5 MHz as KYNU, formerly KQDJ-FM, using the branding "Colt 95 FM".

On November 4, 1996, KYNU became KXGT. The M Street Journal reported that KYNU's country format effectively moved from 95.5 MHz in Jamestown to 98.3 MHz in Carrington, while 95.5 MHz became KXGT with a Westwood One oldies format. By 2003, FMedia! listed KXGT on 95.5 MHz as "Oldies 95".

In October 2005, the Ingstad family moved the "Big Dog" country format from KYNU 98.3 Carrington to KXGT 95.5 Jamestown. As part of the swap, 95.5 MHz again took the KYNU call sign, while the KXGT calls and oldies format moved to 98.3 MHz. Northpine reported that KYNU and new sister station KRVX began broadcasting from a new tower midway between Jamestown and Valley City, with KYNU operating at 100,000 watts and 197 meters HAAT. The station's 2005 license-to-cover application was granted by the FCC on February 16, 2006.

KYNU has remained a country station branded as "Big Dog 95.5". Northpine lists KYNU as i3G Media's 100,000-watt Class C1 country station in Jamestown, and the Jamestown Area Chamber of Commerce lists "KYNU Big Dog Country 95.5 FM" as a hot country format operated from i3G Media's Jamestown office.
