= KVOZ =

Radio station in Laredo, Texas

Del Mar Hills, Texas; United States
- Broadcast area: Laredo, Texas; Nuevo Laredo, Tamaulipas
- Frequency: 890 kHz
- Branding: Radio Cristiana

Programming
- Language: Spanish
- Format: Christian radio

Ownership
- Owner: Consolidated Radio, Inc.

History
- First air date: April 15, 1952
- Former frequencies: 1490 kHz (1952–1988)
- Call sign meaning: "Voz"' is voice in Spanish

Technical information
- Licensing authority: FCC
- Facility ID: 6429
- Class: B
- Power: 10,000 watts (day); 1,000 watts (night)
- Transmitter coordinates: 27°32′57″N 99°22′21″W

Links
- Public license information: Public file; LMS

KVOZ (890 AM, "Radio Cristiana") is a Spanish-language commercial radio station licensed to Del Mar Hills, Texas, United States, and serving Laredo, Texas, and Nuevo Laredo, Tamaulipas, on the United States-Mexico border. Owned by Consolidated Radio, Inc., it airs a Christian radio format, featuring talk and teaching programs with Christian music.

The transmitter is off U.S. Route 59 in Laredo.

== History ==
KVOZ signed on the air on April 15, 1952. It originally broadcast on 1490 kilocycles and its city of license was Laredo. The daytime power was 1,000 watts and at night it reduced power to 250 watts, a fraction of its current output. It added an FM station at 94.9 MHz in 1972.

By the 1980s, the Federal Communications Commission relaxed the rules against assigning stations to clear channel frequencies. With Laredo nearly 1,200 miles (2,245 kilometers) from Chicago, the FCC granted it permission to move to 890 kHz while protecting WLS with reduced power and a directional antenna at night. It made the move to 890 kHz in 1988.
