= KOVC =

- Valley City, North Dakota; United States
- Frequency: 1490 kHz

Programming
- Format: Full service country
- Affiliations: Fox News Radio; Minnesota Timberwolves; Minnesota Twins; Minnesota Vikings

Ownership
- Owner: Ingstad Family Media; (i3G Media, Inc.)
- Sister stations: KDAK, KDDR, KQDJ, KQDJ-FM, KQLX, KQLX-FM, KRVX, KXGT, KYNU

History
- First air date: October 19, 1936
- Former frequencies: 1500 kHz (1936-1941)
- Call sign meaning: VC = Valley City

Technical information
- Licensing authority: FCC
- Facility ID: 60497
- Class: C
- Power: 1,000 watts unlimited
- Transmitter coordinates: 46°54′48″N 98°1′2″W
- Translator: 96.3 K242CZ (Valley City)

Links
- Public license information: Public file; LMS
- Webcast: Listen Live
- Website: newsdakota.com

KOVC (1490 AM) is a radio station based in Valley City, North Dakota, United States. It is a full service station, with frequent weather, news and sports updates. KOVC plays mostly country music and covers local and national sports games.

== History ==
KOVC was authorized by the Federal Communications Commission in July 1936 as a new full-time, 100-watt station on 1500 kHz for Valley City, North Dakota. The station was headed by George B. Bairey. KOVC signed on October 19, 1936. Its first studios were in the Rudolf Hotel, and its original regular daily schedule ran from 7 a.m. to 9 p.m.; Bairey said the idea for a Valley City radio station dated back to 1930, and local accounts described KOVC as intended to serve not only Valley City but surrounding towns and rural areas. A National Register of Historic Places nomination for the Rudolf Hotel also notes that KOVC was once housed in the hotel, with its tower located on the roof.

Early KOVC programming included live music, local market and news features, religious programs, sports, and community entertainment. A November 1936 Valley City Times-Record schedule reproduced by NewsDakota listed KOVC at 1500 kilocycles and showed Friday evening and Saturday programming ranging from the Rudolf String Trio, Dutch Room Serenaders, morning devotionals, market reports, news, and local musical programs to a 9 p.m. sign-off. The station is also associated with the early career of singer Peggy Lee, then known as Norma Egstrom. The New York Public Library states that, as a teenager in North Dakota, Egstrom had a sponsored 15-minute weekly program on KOVC in Valley City and sang at the Rudolf Hotel with the Dutch Room Serenaders before being hired by WDAY in Fargo in 1937.

A 1938 listing in Radio Annual gave KOVC's frequency as 1500 kHz, with 250 watts daytime and 100 watts nighttime. The station was listed as owned and operated by KOVC, Inc., with its business and studio address at the Hotel Rudolf, United Press news service, Standard Radio transcription service, and Mark C. Crandall as station director. A 1939 FCC station list continued to list KOVC at Valley City on 1500 kHz, owned by KOVC, Inc.

KOVC moved from 1500 to 1490 kHz as part of the March 29, 1941 frequency changes under the North American Regional Broadcasting Agreement. A 1961 Federal Register notice showed KOVC operating on 1490 kHz with 250 watts unlimited and seeking authority for 1,000 watts during local-sunset hours. By 1976, FCC transfer notices in Broadcasting listed KOVC as operating on 1490 kHz with 1,000 watts daytime and 250 watts nighttime.

KOVC became part of the Ingstad family broadcasting group. A local retrospective newspaper clipping reproduced by NewsDakota described the station as having been formed by local businesspeople and noted Robert "Bob" Ingstad's early association with the station, including sports announcing and later management and ownership involvement. In 1967, Broadcasting reported that Robert E. Ingstad Jr. owned KOVC in Valley City, along with stations in Jamestown and Wahpeton, North Dakota, and Wadena and Pipestone, Minnesota. In 1976, the FCC approved the assignment of KOVC and several related stations to Ingstad Broadcasting as part of a reorganization of family interests after the death of Robert Ingstad.

By the mid-1980s, KOVC was paired with an FM sister station in Valley City. A 1985 Broadcasting item identified Robert Ingstad as the owner of KOVC(AM)-KKVC(FM) in Valley City, along with additional stations in Minnesota, South Dakota, Kansas, and North Dakota. NewsDakota later summarized KOVC as a station owned by three generations of the Ingstad family.

Longtime station figure Tim Ost moved to Valley City in December 1991 to take on managerial duties at KOVC while also working in sales and on the morning show. He semi-retired from management in 2018 and later left his KOVC morning show in 2022.

After the death of Janice M. Ingstad, FCC records show an involuntary transfer of control of KOVC's licensee, Sioux Valley Broadcasting Company, from Janice M. Ingstad to her estate in 2017. Later that year, the FCC granted a voluntary transfer of control from the Estate of Janice M. Ingstad to Robert J. Ingstad, Tallie Colville, and Todd Ingstad. A 2021 FCC public notice listed the renewal of KOVC's license on 1490 kHz at Valley City, with I3G Media, Inc. as licensee.

On January 30, 2018, KOVC added FM translator service on 96.3 FM, giving the long-running AM station an FM signal while continuing its "Voice of the Valley" identity. KOVC marked its 85th anniversary in 2021 with a six-hour commemorative broadcast featuring memories from past announcers and community members. In present-day local service, NewsDakota identifies KOVC 1490 AM/96.3 FM as "The Voice of the Valley" and describes the station's local programming as including KOVC News, KOVC Sports, "Voice of the Valley", "Super Sports Saturday", "Spotlight on Sports", "Hi-Liner Happenings", and coverage of the Valley City Hi-Liners and Valley City State University Vikings.

== FM translator ==
Call sign	Frequency	City of license	FID	ERP (W)	HAAT	Class	Transmitter coordinates	FCC info
K242CZ	(96.3 MHz) FM	Valley City, North Dakota	200075	250	11 m (36 ft)	D	46°56′6.9″N 98°0′43.3″W	LMS
