= KXGT =

Coordinates: 47.093889°N 99.036778°W

- Carrington, North Dakota; United States
- Broadcast area: Jamestown-Valley City
- Frequency: 98.3 MHz
- Branding: Thunder 106.1 & 98.3

Programming
- Language: English
- Format: Country (KQLX-FM simulcast)
- Affiliations: Fox News Radio

Ownership
- Owner: Ingstad Family Media; (i3G Media, Inc.)
- Sister stations: KDAK, KDDR, KOVC, KQDJ, KQDJ-FM, KQLX, KQLX-FM, KRVX, KYNU

History
- First air date: 1996 (as KYNU)
- Former call signs: KANG (1996); KYNU (1996–2005)

Technical information
- Licensing authority: FCC
- Facility ID: 68625
- Class: C1
- ERP: 100,000 watts
- HAAT: 264 meters (866 ft)

Links
- Public license information: Public file; LMS
- Webcast: Listen Live
- Website: newsdakota.com

KXGT (98.3 FM, "Thunder 106.1 & 98.3") is a radio station broadcasting a gold-based country music format. Except for local sports, the station is a simulcast of sister station KQLX-FM. Licensed to Carrington, North Dakota, United States, the station serves the Jamestown area. The station is currently owned by Ingstad Family Media.

The station was assigned the KXGT call letters by the Federal Communications Commission on October 20, 2005.

== History ==
former Sunny 98.3 logo

The present 98.3 MHz facility in Carrington entered the broadcast record in 1996. The M Street Journal listed a new Carrington station on 98.3 MHz and reported the assignment of the KANG call letters in April 1996. Later that year, M Street reported that KANG had become KYNU and was carrying a Westwood One country format. The same report noted that KYNU's country format had effectively moved from KXGT 95.5 MHz in Jamestown to 98.3 MHz in Carrington, while the 95.5 MHz facility took the KYNU calls and changed from country to Westwood One oldies programming.

For its first years on 98.3, the Carrington station operated as KYNU with country programming. In October 2005, the Ingstad family reshuffled its Jamestown-area FM stations while signing on KRVX 103.1 MHz at Wimbledon. NorthPine reported that the "Big Dog" country format that had aired on KYNU 98.3 moved to KXGT 95.5 in Jamestown, with 95.5 also taking the KYNU call sign. At the same time, the KXGT oldies format and call sign moved from 95.5 to 98.3. NorthPine reported that the 98.3 facility continued to transmit from a site about 20 miles northwest of Jamestown with 100,000 watts at 264 meters above average terrain.

After the 2005 swap, KXGT operated on 98.3 with an oldies format. By early 2012, the station was being identified locally as "Sunny 98.3" with an adult contemporary format; NewsDakota referred to the station as "KXGT Sunny 98.3 FM" in February 2012 sports coverage. In August 2012, NorthPine reported that KXGT, described as serving Carrington and Jamestown and rebroadcast on K274BH 102.7 MHz in Valley City, dropped its four-year-old adult contemporary format and flipped to a broad classic hits format branded as "Ted."

In 2017, KXGT was among the North Dakota stations affected by a transfer of control involving the Ingstad family holdings. The Federal Communications Commission granted a voluntary transfer of control for KXGT, then licensed to Two Rivers Broadcasting, Inc., from the Estate of Janice M. Ingstad to Robert J. Ingstad, Tallie Colville, and Todd Ingstad. DakotaWire reported in November 2017 that the three would each take 33 percent ownership stakes in North Dakota assets held under Sioux Valley Broadcasting and Two Rivers Broadcasting, including Classic Hits "98.3 Ted-FM" KXGT Carrington.

In February 2018, KXGT changed formats again as part of an Ingstad family station shuffle. NorthPine reported that KXGT began simulcasting the "Farm News and Real Country" format of "Thunder 106-1", KQLX-FM 106.1 MHz in Lisbon. KXGT's former classic hits "Ted FM" format continued on K246AM 97.1 MHz in Jamestown and K274BH 102.7 MHz in Valley City, originating on the HD2 signal of KRVX 103.1 MHz.

The FCC granted KXGT's license renewal application in March 2021, listing the station as facility ID 68625, operating on 98.3 MHz at Carrington and licensed to I3G Media, Inc. NorthPine's North Dakota station listing identifies KXGT as an i3G Media station broadcasting with 100,000 watts at 264 meters, carrying Country/Farm programming branded "Thunder 106-1 and 98-3" in a simulcast with KQLX-FM 106.1 Lisbon. The 2026 North Dakota Newspaper Association Media Guide lists KXGT-FM under i3G Media in Jamestown, with Lynn Lambrecht as general manager.
