= KSJZ =

Coordinates: 46.818°N 98.711°W

- Jamestown, North Dakota; United States
- Frequency: 93.3 MHz
- Branding: Mix 93.3

Programming
- Format: Hot adult contemporary
- Affiliations: Compass Media Networks

Ownership
- Owner: Chesterman Communications Jamestown
- Sister stations: KSJB

History
- Former call signs: KSJM (1967-1990)

Technical information
- Licensing authority: FCC
- Facility ID: 10774
- Class: C1
- ERP: 100,000 watts
- HAAT: 137 meters (449 ft)

Links
- Public license information: Public file; LMS
- Webcast: Listen live
- Website: www.mixjamestown.com

KSJZ (93.3 FM, "Mix 93.3") is a radio station broadcasting a hot adult contemporary music format. The station serves Jamestown, North Dakota, Stutsman County, and surrounding small towns including Valley City, Carrington, Edgeley, and others in an 80-mile (130 km) radius. It is owned by Chesterman Communications.

Both KSJB and KSJZ broadcast from studios at the Buffalo Mall. They share a transmitter site south of Jamestown, on Highway 281.

== History ==
KSJZ first signed on the air in 1967 with the calls KSJM. The calls were changed to KSJZ on November 12, 1990, after being purchased by Chesterman Company. From 1967 until early 1991, the station ran automated reel tapes with different music formats. In 1991, KSJZ began operating as an adult contemporary music station with a live morning deejay and satellite programming the rest of the day.

On April 2, 2012, KSJZ changed its format from adult contemporary (as "Kiss 93.3") to hot AC, branded as "Mix 93.3".

In September 2026, I3G Media purchased KSJZ alongside sister station KSJB.
