= KQLX (AM) =

- Lisbon, North Dakota; United States
- Broadcast area: Fargo-Moorhead
- Frequency: 890 kHz
- Branding: 890 Ag News

Programming
- Format: Agricultural News/Talk and classic country at night and weekends.

Ownership
- Owner: I3G Radio, LLC
- Sister stations: KDAK, KDDR, KOVC, KQDJ, KQDJ-FM, KQLX-FM, KRVX, KXGT, KYNU

History
- First air date: August 16, 1984

Technical information
- Licensing authority: FCC
- Facility ID: 60189
- Class: D
- Power: 1,800 watts (day only)
- Transmitter coordinates: 46°36′54″N 97°7′56″W
- Translators: K297BX (107.3 MHz, Lisbon)

Links
- Public license information: Public file; LMS
- Webcast: Listen Live
- Website: Ag News890 website

KQLX (890 AM, "890 Ag News") is a radio station licensed to serve Lisbon, North Dakota. It airs an Agricultural News/Talk format and classic country at night and weekends.

A sale was finalized in July 2009, for transfer of ownership from Terry Loomis's Sheyenne Valley Broadcasting to Great Plains Integrated of Fargo, North Dakota. Great Plains Integrated was owned by Scott Hennen until he was forced out of the company in 2010.

The station was assigned the call sign KQLX by the Federal Communications Commission on August 16, 1984.

== History ==
KQLX went on the air in November 1984. Terry Loomis later described the original AM station as "Ag News 890", a service dedicated to the farming community with local agricultural news, and said it was one of the first affiliates of the American Ag Network. A December 1984 issue of DX News described KQLX as a new station "now on the air" on 890 kHz, rather than a previously listed 720 kHz proposal, and listed the station as operating with 1,000 watts during daytime hours from 1206 South Main Street in Lisbon.

The station soon became part of a two-station Lisbon operation. KQLX-FM 106.1 signed on in April 1986 as a sister station to the AM. KQLX was also associated with local sports coverage in southeastern North Dakota. Sportscaster Bruce Dougherty joined KQLX Radio in June 1985 and remained with the station until May 2009; the North Dakota Associated Press Sportscasters and Sportswriters Association credits Dougherty with broadcasting more than 3,500 games during his career, primarily Class B high school sports in southeast North Dakota.

In 1995, KQLX became one of the first affiliates of the Red River Farm Network. Loomis also took over sole ownership of both KQLX and KQLX-FM that year.

KQLX upgraded its AM facility in 2005, increasing from 1,000 watts to 1,800 watts while remaining daytime-only. NorthPine reported that the change improved the station's signal toward Fargo, while the format remained news, farm, talk and classic country. The next year, KQLX applied to move its transmitter 27 miles closer to Fargo, retaining the 1,800-watt nondirectional daytime facility.

In 2008, Ag News 890 joined the National Association of Farm Broadcasting, and Loomis said the station became dedicated to "everything farming". Mick Kjar's Farm Talk program has aired on Ag News 890 since 2008 and later became part of the Ag Central Radio Network, carried by stations across North Dakota and South Dakota.

In 2009, Sheyenne Valley Broadcasting, owned by Terry and Rita Loomis, agreed to sell KQLX and KQLX-FM to Great Plains Integrated Marketing, a Fargo-based company headed by Scott Hennen. The sale price was reported as $750,000 and excluded the KQLX building in Lisbon and the station's former transmitter site. The FCC granted the assignment of KQLX from Sheyenne Valley Broadcasting to Great Plains Integrated Marketing on October 15, 2009. Under Great Plains, KQLX was to continue its farm/country format as "890 Ag News", while the AM and FM studios moved to Fargo with WZFG and KEGK; NorthPine reported that the Lisbon sales office would remain open.

The FCC granted a transfer of control of Great Plains Integrated Marketing from J. Scott Hennen to Michael J. Hofer and others in December 2010, with the action appearing in a January 3, 2011 FCC public notice. In December 2015, the FCC granted assignment of KQLX from Great Plains Integrated Marketing to Dakota Broadcasting, LLC.

In February 2016, Dakota Broadcasting filed to assign KQLX and KQLX-FM to I3G Radio, LLC. NewsDakota, citing Inside Radio, reported the proposed transaction as a $1 million purchase of KQLX and KQLX-FM by four members of the Ingstad family doing business as i3G Radio, and described the AM as a regional agricultural news outlet. The same report stated that Terry Loomis, who had built the stations in the mid-1980s, would continue as general manager. NorthPine reported in June 2016 that i3G Radio had bought KQLX and KQLX-FM from Dakota Broadcasting.

Ag Central Radio Network launched in 2018 as an agricultural information network covering North Dakota, South Dakota and adjacent areas of western Minnesota. The network's offerings included farm news reports, weather reports, hourly regional newscasts and agricultural market reports. The Fargo Moorhead West Fargo Chamber of Commerce lists KQLX-AM 890 as the flagship station of Ag Central Radio Network, with programming and features focusing on agriculture across North Dakota and parts of South Dakota and Minnesota.

As of the mid-2020s, KQLX's own app description identified Ag News 890 as a farm, ranch and agricultural information station for eastern North Dakota, west-central Minnesota and eastern South Dakota, carrying Fox News, Ag Central Radio Network national and regional agricultural news, Ag Central weather from meteorologist Mick Kjar and local news reports. The station's current contact page lists Ag News 890/KQLX AM at 1411 32nd Street South in Fargo.

On March 4, 2026, the FCC granted assignment of KQLX, KQLX-FM and translator K297BX from I3G Radio, LLC to i3G Media, Inc.
