= KSJB =

- Jamestown, North Dakota; United States
- Frequency: 600 kHz
- Branding: KSJB 600

Programming
- Format: Classic country
- Affiliations: AP Radio

Ownership
- Owner: Chesterman Communications; (Chesterman Communications Jamestown, Inc.)
- Sister stations: KSJZ

History
- First air date: March 14, 1937
- Former call signs: KRMC (1937–1942)

Technical information
- Licensing authority: FCC
- Facility ID: 10778
- Class: B
- Power: 5,000 watts unlimited
- Transmitter coordinates: 46°49′2.9″N 98°42′35.4″W
- Translator: 100.1 K261FC (Jamestown)

Links
- Public license information: Public file; LMS
- Webcast: Listen live
- Website: www.ksjbam.com

KSJB (600 AM) is a radio station based in Jamestown in the U.S. state of North Dakota.

Broadcasting with 5,000 watts of power and a directional pattern that drives the signal from northeast to southwest, the station boasts that it can be heard clearly in six states and two Canadian provinces. KSJB can be heard with a clear "city-grade" signal in cities such as Valley City, Bismarck, Fargo, Grand Forks, and Minot, North Dakota; Pierre, South Dakota; Winnipeg, Manitoba, Canada; and Bemidji, Minnesota.

Both KSJB and KSJZ broadcast from studios at the Buffalo Mall. They share a transmitter site south of Jamestown, on Highway 281.

== Programming ==
When the station signed on in 1937 as KRMC, it featured local programs and news, with standard middle of the road music formatting. Beginning in 1963, KSJB programmed a "Top 40" format, competing directly with Bismarck's KFYR located 100 miles (160 km) to the west, which also featured a popular music format. In the 1960s the station became heavily involved with various promotions, including publishing and distributing a weekly Top 40 handout and sponsoring numerous concerts. Several of those concerts featured Count Basie's Orchestra, who station owner at that time Ed Crilly often played with on various cruise ships in the early 1970s. After extensive research, in 1973 the decision was made to change the format to country-western, and the change was made over the Easter weekend, without fanfare, or prior notice to the listeners or the announcing staff. Given the station's extensive reach, it continued to focus on music and programming for truck drivers and farmers, with a schedule heavy with farm market reports and agribusiness information. Currently KSJB broadcasts classic country music, local news, hundreds of local and regional Class A and Class B football and basketball games, and specialty programming on weekends.

== History ==
KSJB first signed on the air March 14, 1937. It operated under the call sign KRMC with a power of 250 watts daytime and 100 watts at night on 1310 kHz. The call letters KRMC came from the company name at the time: Roberts, MacNab Co. (Arthur L. Roberts, R.B. MacNab and A.J. Breitbach, general manager.) The studios were at the Gladstone Hotel downtown, and the transmitter and tower was on the south edge of Jamestown. A few years later, the station moved to their current frequency of 600 kHz, but the power was still 250 watts daytime and 100 watts at night. Later the station was purchased by John W. Boler, who changed the callsign to KSJB in 1942. Finally in 1947, KSJB began its operation as a 5,000-watt directional station, with the transmitter and triple towers located along highway 281 about 6 miles south of Jamestown. Both are still located there, and in the fall of 2014, all three towers and original infrastructure was replaced at a cost of $900,000. The company's FM station, KSJZ "MIX 93.3" (originally KSJM), an adult contemporary radio station, went on the air in 1967.

In 1948, KSJB "established auxiliary studios and control facilities in Fargo". Studios and offices were added in Aberdeen, South Dakota, in the 1960s as well, but none of those exist today.

KSJB was an affiliate of CBS News Radio until the network's closure in 2026; it was replaced by AP Radio.

In September 2026, I3G Media purchased KSJB (including the translator) alongside KSJZ.
