= KQLX-FM =

- Lisbon, North Dakota; United States
- Broadcast area: Fargo-Moorhead
- Frequency: 106.1 MHz
- Branding: Thunder 106.1 & 98.3

Programming
- Language: English
- Format: Country
- Affiliations: Fox News Radio

Ownership
- Owner: I3G Radio, LLC
- Sister stations: KDAK, KDDR, KOVC, KQDJ, KQDJ-FM, KQLX, KRVX, KXGT, KYNU

History
- First air date: May 5, 1986

Technical information
- Licensing authority: FCC
- Facility ID: 60188
- Class: C1
- ERP: 100,000 watts
- HAAT: 217.8 meters (714.6 feet)
- Transmitter coordinates: 46°44′39″N 97°25′38″W
- Repeater: 98.3 KXGT (Carrington)

Links
- Public license information: Public file; LMS
- Webcast: Listen Live
- Website: thunder1061.com

KQLX-FM (106.1 MHz, "Thunder 106.1 & 98.3") is a radio station broadcasting a gold-based country music format. Licensed to Lisbon, North Dakota, it serves the Fargo-Moorhead metropolitan area.

Its studios are located in Valley City, while its transmitter is located northwest of Leonard.

== History ==
On April 29, 2005, the Federal Communications Commission (FCC) granted KQLX-FM a construction permit to upgrade increase in power to 100,000 watts from a location nearer Fargo, North Dakota from 50,000 watts at a site in Lisbon. The station upgraded on April 29, 2008 and tweaked from "Hit Kickin' Country" to a classic country format as "True Country".

A sale was finalized in July 2009, for transfer of ownership from Terry Loomis's Sheyenne Valley Broadcasting to Great Plains Integrated of Fargo, North Dakota. Great Plains Integrated was owned by Scott Hennen until he was forced out of the company in 2010.

The station was assigned the callsign KQLX-FM by the Federal Communications Commission on May 5, 1986.

On March 18, 2009 KQLX-FM changed their format to talk radio, branded as "106.1 FM Talk". The 106.1 FM Talk lineup included Don Imus, Dennis Miller, Jake Weber, Glenn Beck, Jason Lewis, and Tony Bruno. In April, 106.1 FM Talk announced The Ed Schultz Show will be joining the station lineup. The MSNBC "Ed" Show aired weeknights at 5pm on FM Talk now and the Ed Schultz Show started the show in July. KFGO in Fargo refused to air the Ed Schultz national show live and instead aired the show late at night tape delayed. Ed Schultz fell through shortly in September 2009, and KQLX reverted to the a country format as "106.1 Liberty FM".

On November 1, 2010, KQLX-FM rebranded as "Thunder 106.1" with a classic-based country format and began targeting the Fargo-Moorhead area.
