= Right Hand =

Right Hand may refer to:

- "Right Hand" (song), by Drake, 2015
- "Right Hand", a 2007 song by T-Pain from Epiphany
- The Right Hand (TV series), a Canadian reality show

== See also ==
- Handedness
- Right Hand Man (disambiguation)
