= Dan Leal =

American film director (born 1969)

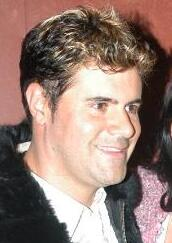
- Leal at XRCO Awards 2007
- Born: September 18, 1969 (age 56); Washington, D.C., U.S.
- Other name: Porno Dan
- Occupations: Director; producer; pornographic film actor
- Years active: 2001–present
- Notable work: Immoral Productions
- Television: The Right Hand

Dan Leal, also known as Porno Dan (born September 18, 1969), is an American pornographic movie director and actor. He has over 150 AVN Award, XBIZ Award and XRCO Award nominations and was inducted into the AVN Hall of Fame in 2015. He has released over 500 movies through Pure Play Media and produced well over 3,000 scenes.

== Early life ==
He was born on September 18, 1969, in Washington D.C. He graduated from Lake Braddock High School in 1987 as a member of the National Honor Society. Leal was an altar boy for seven years and taught CCD for three years at Holy Spirit Catholic Church. During college, he was a member of Phi Kappa Sigma fraternity and graduated from George Mason University in 1992 with a Bachelor of Arts in Economics.

He worked for Danka Business Systems from 1993 to 1998 as a sales executive and major accounts sales manager. He also worked for Ikon Office Solutions between 1998 and 2002 as a High Volume Sales Manager and Color Graphics Manager.

== Career ==
=== Television career ===
Leal has been one of the few adult performer and directors to gain mainstream exposure including a reality series that ran for 2 seasons on HBO Canada Called "The Right Hand". In 2018 he was nominated by XBIZ as the Mainstream Star of the Year, the sixth time he was nominated for that award. In addition, he has been nominated three times by AVN as the Mainstream Star of the Year.

As a result of the popularity of the show in Canada, it aired internationally on Sky in Italy, Globosat in Brazil and TVN in Poland.

=== Danland ===
Leal's journey through adult was documented in the 2012 feature-length film ″Danland″ which is described as a portrait of amateur porn producer Dan Leal, aka "Porno Dan." While he is at the top of his game, he wants to stop starring in his own movies. Here, we follow him on a three-year quest to build his business and find love which ends up leading us deep inside the heart and mind of Porno Dan.

First-time director Alexandra Berger spent three and a half years following Leal during his search for a romantic relationship. The resulting documentary, Danland, follows a relatively familiar narrative structure, but its focus on Leal as a subject provides much of the film's dramatic and emotional interest.

Danland aired on Netflix in the United States beginning in 2014. "This thrust Leal into a broader spotlight than ever before illustrating exactly what makes him such a singular and, yes, a significant figure in the annals of adult films."

=== Other media appearances ===
In 2016 Leal appeared in the short film "Love in Porn" which selected to be in Cannes Film Festival Short Film Corner. He also appeared in 2017 on Micky Flanagan's TV Series, "Thinking Aloud" which aired on Sky 1 in the UK.

=== Live streaming and web presence ===
His first foray into what would be his biggest success was in May 2009, when Leal announced that his company had entered into a 3-way partnership with AEBN and CamZ. to start steaming his top-selling Fuck A Fan show.

This led to what would become a partnership with leading live cam site Streamate. Streamate(ICF Technology, Inc.) is still the home of the company's live shows and the sex portion of his content is live-streamed on the Streamate Network. Fuck A Fan was the number one show on Streamate for many years and Dan has been nominated several times as the most popular male on cam. AVN Award s Favorite Cam Guy

In January 2012, Leal announced that Immoral Productions had partnered with BlazingBucks.com to host Immoral Productions content. Gamma Entertainment shortly after acquired Blazing Bucks and are still Leal's partners to this day for his Immoral Live site.

=== As an actor ===
Leal has stated in interviews that he often uses humor regarding his anatomy, describing himself as 'Little Dynamite' in contrast to industry standards. Five times he has been nominated as the Best Male Performer in Europe and four times has been nominated by AVN for sex scenes in which he appeared as an actor. He has been a finalist as the most popular male performer in the world several times most recently in 2020 by AVN for their annual awards show. He has been in over 2,000+ scenes and worked with many major top stars including Lana Rhoades, Riley Reid, Adriana Chechik, Nicole Aniston, and Sara Jay.

=== As a director ===
Leal has received many accolades in his career for his unique directing style which much more free-flowing and causal than traditional porn. One of the first places to recognize his efforts was Fox Magazine where he was named the top-director in the adult industry in 2012. He has directed over 3,000 scenes in his 20-year career and three times being nominated as the top director in Europe by XBIZ.

In 2021 He won the Director Site of the Year of Award at the XBIZ Europa Show

==== Controversy ====
During the fight over Measure B, the mandated condom usage law, Leal and his suite of companies were the first to comply with the measure and take their studio all-condom. Contrary to popular belief, Leal has started the adjustment to condoms but has yet to see his revenue drop. "Some of my series started [using condoms] as long as four years ago," Leal told XBIZ. "‘Fuck a Fan’ was the first one I did with condoms." Leal produces, directs and performs in his live shoots that are later packaged for DVD distribution by Pure Play Media. In February, he changed his company policy from condom optional to mandatory.

==== Move to Europe ====
In late 2016, Leal made the decision to move the production of his company from Los Angeles, California to Budapest, Hungary. This was seen as a big gamble by many as he was the first producer in Europe to shoot live. His light-hearted and fun-filled directing style quickly won over the fans, models and those in the industry and he was nominated as Best Foreign Studio by XBIZ for their 2018 Awards show. Since moving to Europe he has continued to produce his unique-style content and continues to receive commercial and critical acclaim for his work.

== Awards ==
- Best Squirting Series - Squirtamania - 2011 AVN Awards
- Amateur Series of the Year - Fuck A Fan - 2013 XBIZ Awards
- Pro-Am Release of the Year- Hand Job Winner 18 - 2015 XBIZ Awards
- AVN Hall of Fame - Class of 2015
- Pro-Am Release of the Year - Fuck A Fan 27 - 2017 XBIZ Awards
- Hardcore Site of the Year - ImmoralLive.com - 2018 XBIZ Europa Awards
- Director Site of The Year - ImmoralLive.com - XBIZ Europa Awards https://www.xbiz.com/news/261746/2021-xbiz-europa-awards-winners-announced
- Dan had been very active working to raise funds and doing volunteer work in Ukraine and was a finalist of the 2023 Community Figure of the Year https://www.xbiz.com/news/269966/dan-leal-cel
