= OPEN (North Dakota magazine) =

- Spring 2008 issue of OPEN Magazine
- Categories: General interest
- Frequency: Quarterly
- Publisher: FrostFire Media Corporation
- Paid circulation: 1,000
- Unpaid circulation: 29,000
- Total circulation: 30,000 (2007)
- Founded: 2007
- Final issue: 2009
- Country: United States
- Based in: KRJ Building; 503 7th Street North; Fargo, North Dakota 58102; United States
- Language: English
- ISSN: 1940-2198

OPEN Magazine was a quarterly city and lifestyle magazine focusing upon fashion, style, entertainment, dining and culture for the Fargo, North Dakota and Moorhead, Minnesota metropolitan areas. Feature articles generally cover local people, businesses, restaurants, entertainment, sports, home and travel.

== History and profile ==
OPEN Magazine was launched in May 2007. In January 2008 the publication was awarded the Fargo Human Relations Award from the city of Fargo for its efforts to expand awareness of diverse communities within the city. In addition publisher, Christopher Mohs, was awarded the 2008 North Dakota Small Business Journalist of the Year Award from the U.S. Small Business Administration for the efforts of OPEN Magazine and its impact on small businesses in the region.

Each issue of OPEN Magazine reached an estimated 120,000 readers and included four main feature articles (typically two female, two male and at least one individual representing a diverse or ethnic group in the community). The magazine's departments covered sports, city, food, travel, health, history, social occasions and home. OPEN Magazine also included an entertainment listing and restaurant guide.

OPEN Magazine was published by Fargo-based media company FrostFire Media Corporation

Production of OPEN Magazine and its sister publication Fargo Business Magazine was discontinued in the fall of 2009, largely a result of the economic impact of the spring floods that hit the metro area that year and greater impacts effecting print publications nationally at the time. Its parent company FrostFire Media Corporation still exists as a holding company based in Minneapolis, Minnesota.

== Editorial and artistic staff (as of 2008) ==
- Merrie Sue Holtan (Managing editor)
- Phil Lowe (Art director)
- Rachael Hammarback (Fashion & lifestyle editor)
- Maren Marks (Restaurant and bar editor)
- Nathan Cote (Photography director)

== Awards ==
- Fargo Human Relations Award
- 2008 North Dakota Small Business Journalist of the Year Award (Christopher Mohs)

== Notable local contributors ==
- Tracy Briggs
- Najla Amundson
- Jodee Bock

== Advertisers ==
A look at OPEN magazine's advertisers gives an idea of its target audience. A typical issue reveals a preponderance of ads for high-end businesses as well as generally affordable product venues. Examples of full-page ads for the following:

- KFGO/Radio Fargo Moorhead
- MeritCare Regional Health Center
- Ramada Plaza & Suites
- Oliver Peoples/McCulley Optix Gallery
- Tacori/Royal Jewelers
- Completely Home
- LexliMD
- Innovis Health
- The Lodge on Lake Detroit
- Fargostuff.com
- The Avelon Events Center
- Prudential LRES Realty
- Fair Hills Resort
- Blue Cross Blue Shield of North Dakota
- American Diabetes Association
- Trollwood Performing Arts School
- Fargo Moorhead Opera
- Chrysler/Global Electric Motorcars

== See also ==
- Media in Fargo-Moorhead
