= North Dakota Horse Park =

Horse racing venue in North Dakota, United States

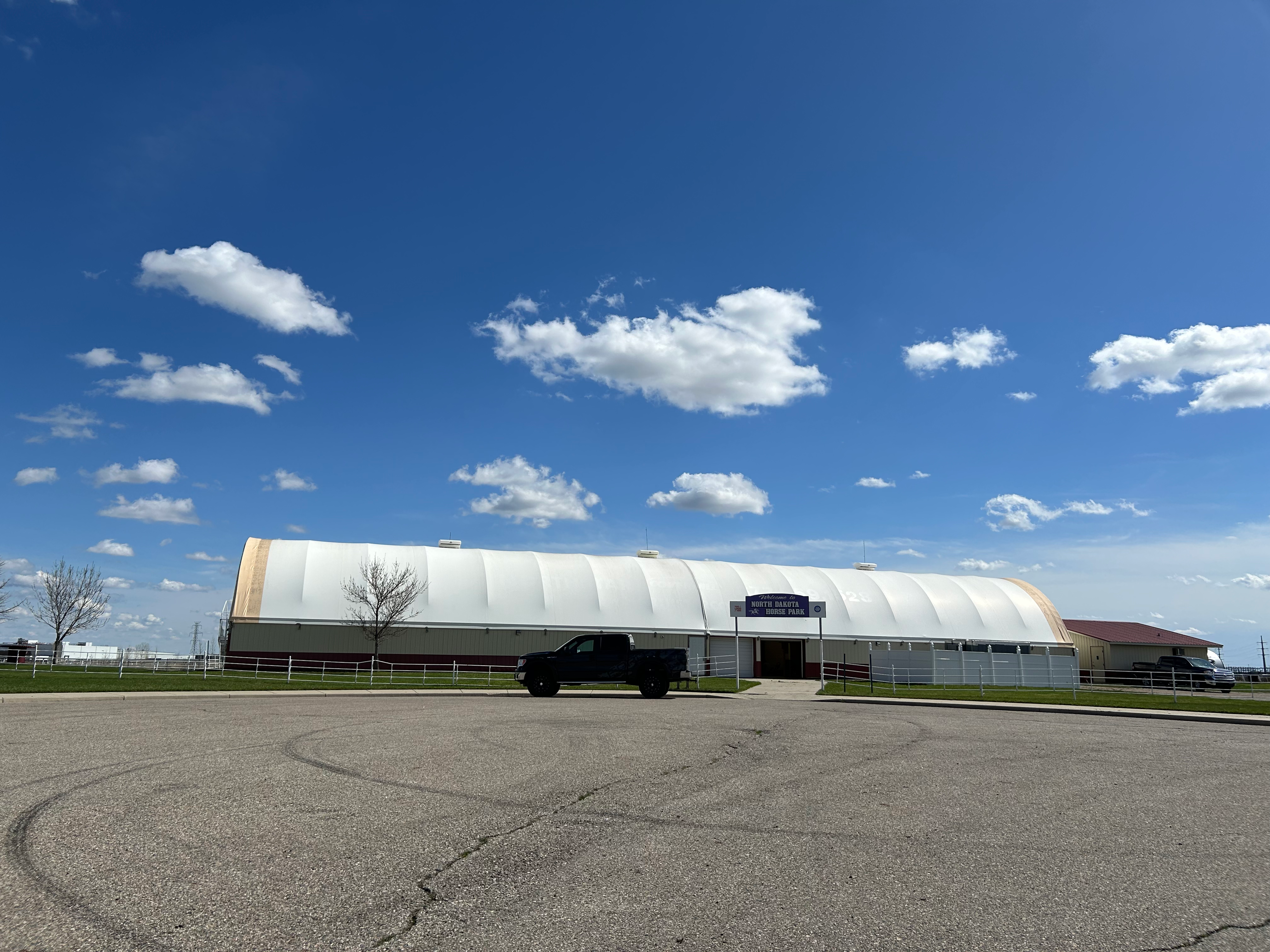
- Interactive map of North Dakota Horse Park
- Location: 5180 19th Ave N Fargo, North Dakota, USA
- Coordinates: 46°54′05″N 96°52′38″W
- Owned by: Horse Race North Dakota
- Course type: Six furlong flat racing
- Notable races: North Dakota Derby; North Dakota Futurity

The North Dakota Horse Park is a horse racing venue in Fargo, North Dakota, located on 19th Ave N west of Interstate 29.

The park is licensed for up to 9 days of racing in 2013, though each year it is typically open for one weekend of racing in late July.

In 2021 North Dakota Attorney General has published an opinion that Horse Race North Dakota violated open meeting laws by not posting clear notice of a meeting and its agenda.
