= RDO Building =

High-rise building in Fargo, North Dakota, U.S.

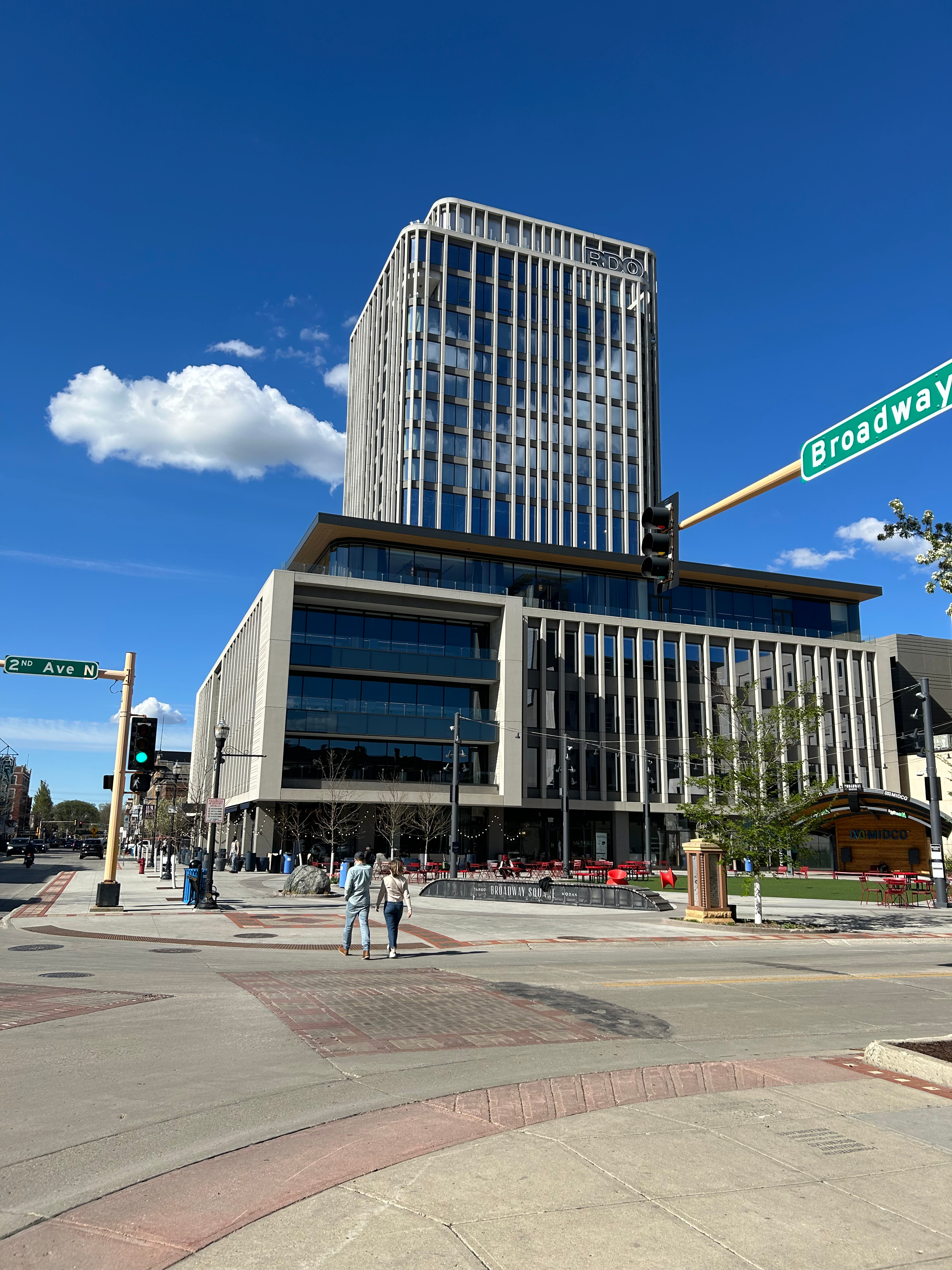
- The RDO Building in 2024
- Interactive map of the RDO Building area
- Alternative names: Block 9

General information
- Status: Completed
- Type: Mid-Rise Mixed Use
- Location: 225 Broadway N., Fargo, North Dakota, U.S.
- Coordinates: 46°52′43″N 96°47′14″W
- Construction started: September 18, 2018; 7 years ago
- Completed: July 2020
- Opening: September 2020
- Cost: $117 million
- Owner: Kilbourne Group

Height
- Roof: 235 ft (72 m)
- Top floor: 18

Technical details
- Floor count: 18
- Lifts/elevators: 6

Design and construction
- Structural engineer: Skidmore, Owings & Merrill
- Main contractor: McGough Construction Co.

The RDO Building is a mixed-use high-rise building located in Downtown Fargo, North Dakota, United States. It became the city's tallest building in 2020, surpassing the Radisson Blu since 1985, and is the second tallest building in the state. The building was formally named Block 9 Tower until the R.D. Offutt Corporation purchased the naming rights of the building. The building is owned and operated by the Kilbourne Group. In addition, the RDO Building contains an expansive programmed community plaza known as Broadway Square, spanning over a half acre.

== History ==
The RDO Building was originally announced in 2016 as Block 9 Tower. It was developed by Kilbourne Group and was planned to be the tallest building in the state at 250 feet (76 m). The project had dated back to 2013, however, no plans were officially announced until 2016. By 2018, the height had been shortened to 235 feet (72 m), and ground was later broken on September 12 of that same year. During construction in 2019, R.D. Offutt announced that it would make the building its headquarters and would purchase the naming rights. Block 9 Tower officially opened on February 1, 2021 as the RDO Building.

== Design ==
The RDO Building was designed by Skidmore, Owings, & Merrill and uses a glass and metal facade design. At a height of 235 feet (72 m) with 18 floors, it is the tallest building in Fargo and second tallest building in North Dakota behind the North Dakota State Capitol in Bismarck. The RDO Building is the headquarters of R.D. Offutt and has offices for Dot's Pretzels.. It is a mixed-use development that has a six story podium with a hotel, residential, and retail spaces. The hotel is known as the Jasper Hotel and is operated by Aparium Hotel Group.
