= John E. Carlson Coliseum =

Multi-purpose arena in Fargo, North Dakota

Coordinates: 46°54′06″N 96°47′31″W

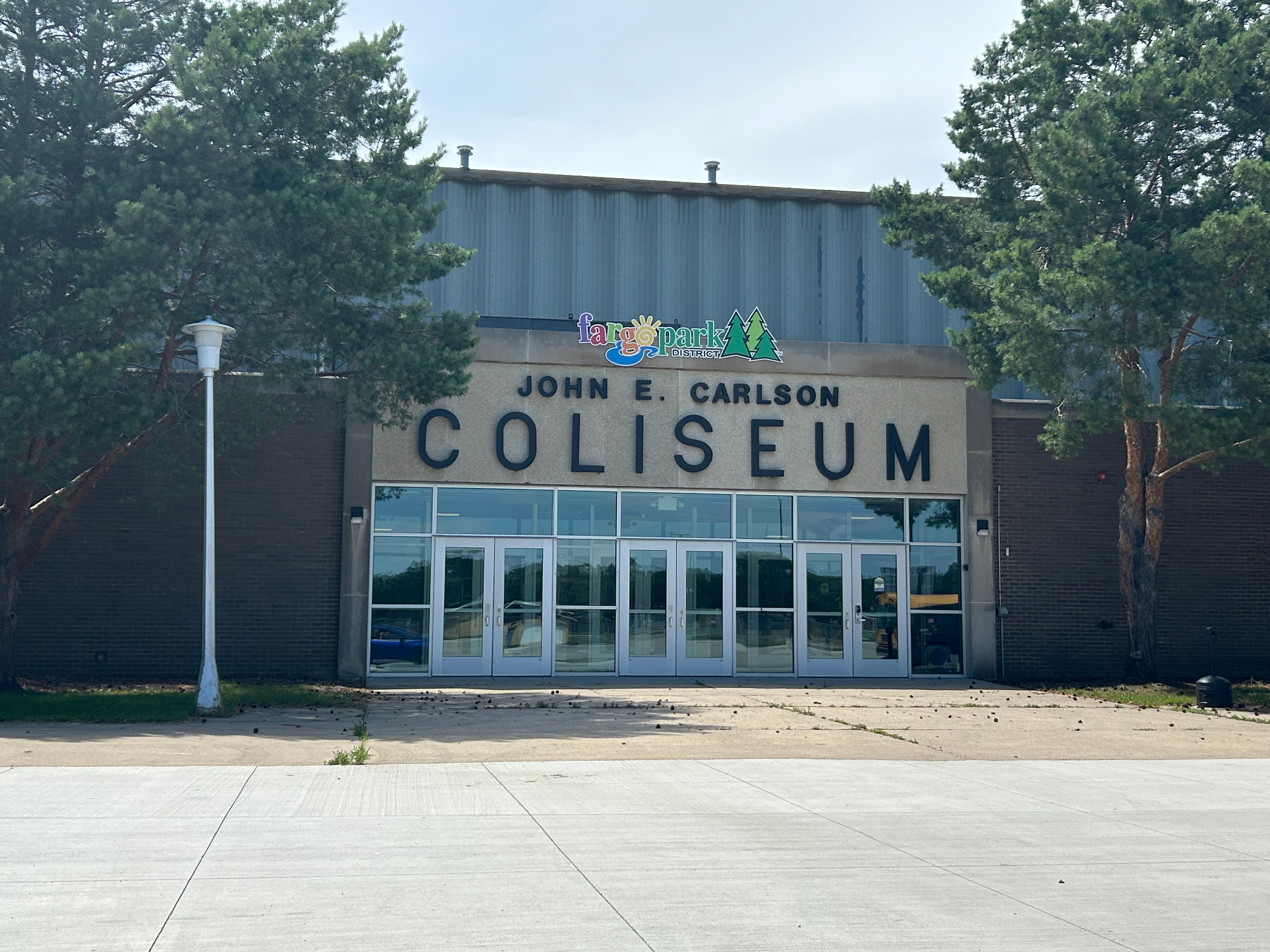
- Interactive map of John E. Carlson Coliseum
- Location: Fargo, North Dakota
- Capacity: 4,200

Construction
- Opened: 1968

Tenant
- Fargo-Moorhead Jets (NAHL) (2003–2008)

The John E. Carlson Coliseum is a 4,200-seat multi-purpose arena in Fargo, North Dakota. It is the home of the North Dakota State University ice hockey club team of the American Collegiate Hockey Association.

It was the former home to the Fargo-Moorhead Jets, the Fargo North Spartans, and the Fargo South Bruins ice hockey teams.

It opened in 1968, and was renovated during 2017. It now has a regulation-size rink, ice generation equipment, team locker and training room, referees room, and full Wi-Fi access.
