= Fargo Civic Center =

Coordinates: 46°52′43″N 96°47′2″W

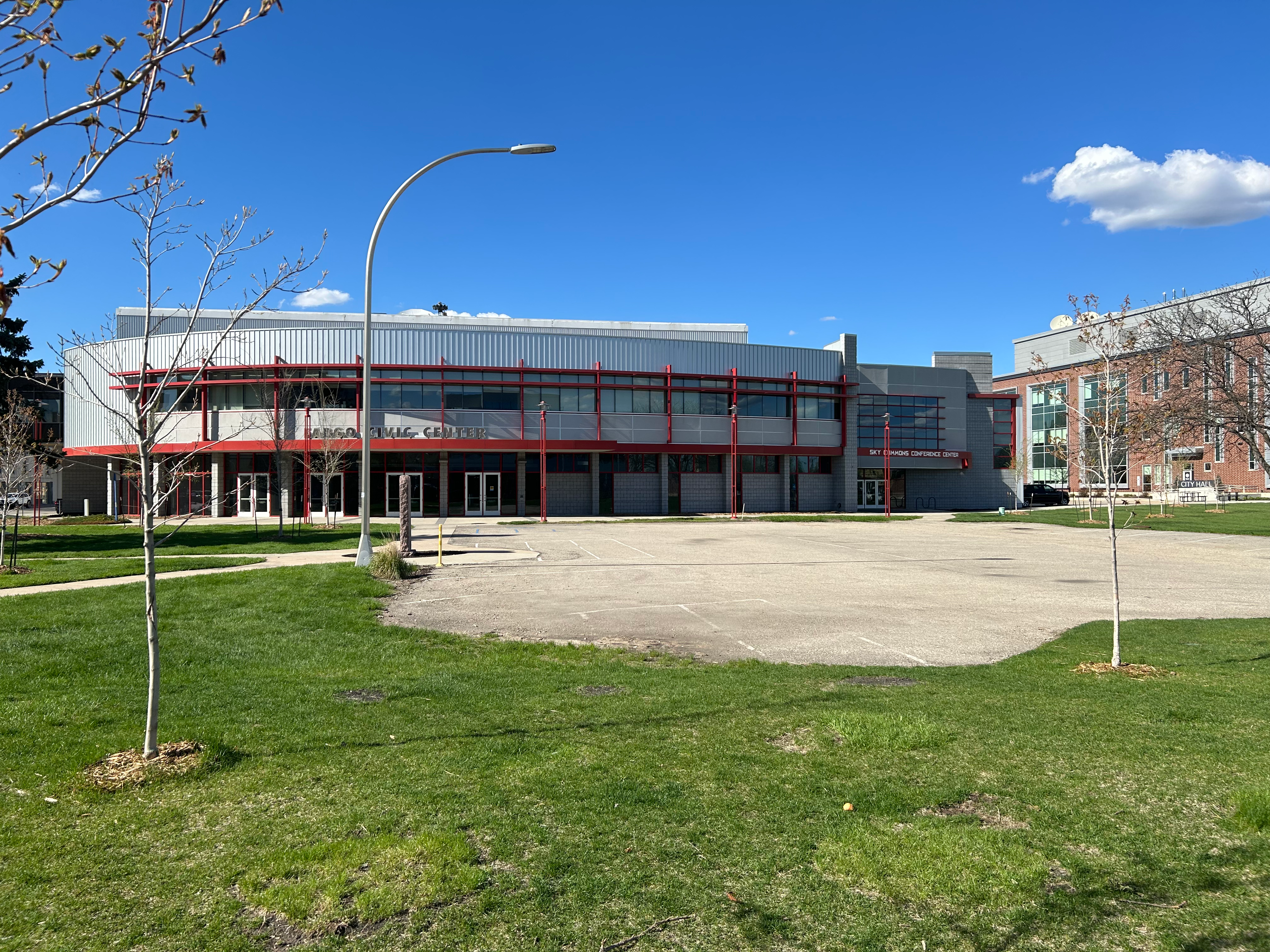
- Fargo Civic Center in May 2024
- Interactive map of the Fargo Civic Center area

General information
- Type: Arena
- Location: 207 4th St N Fargo, ND 58102
- Opening: 1961
- Owner: City of Fargo

Technical details
- Floor area: 34,000 sq. ft.

Fargo Civic Center is an indoor arena located in Fargo, North Dakota. The 34,000 sq ft center can hold approximately 3,000 people during concerts and 2,800 people during basketball games. It also hosts trade shows, sporting events, entertainment events, meetings and community events.
