= Fargo–Moorhead Toll Bridge =

Toll bridge over the Red River of the North, bridging North Dakota and Minnesota

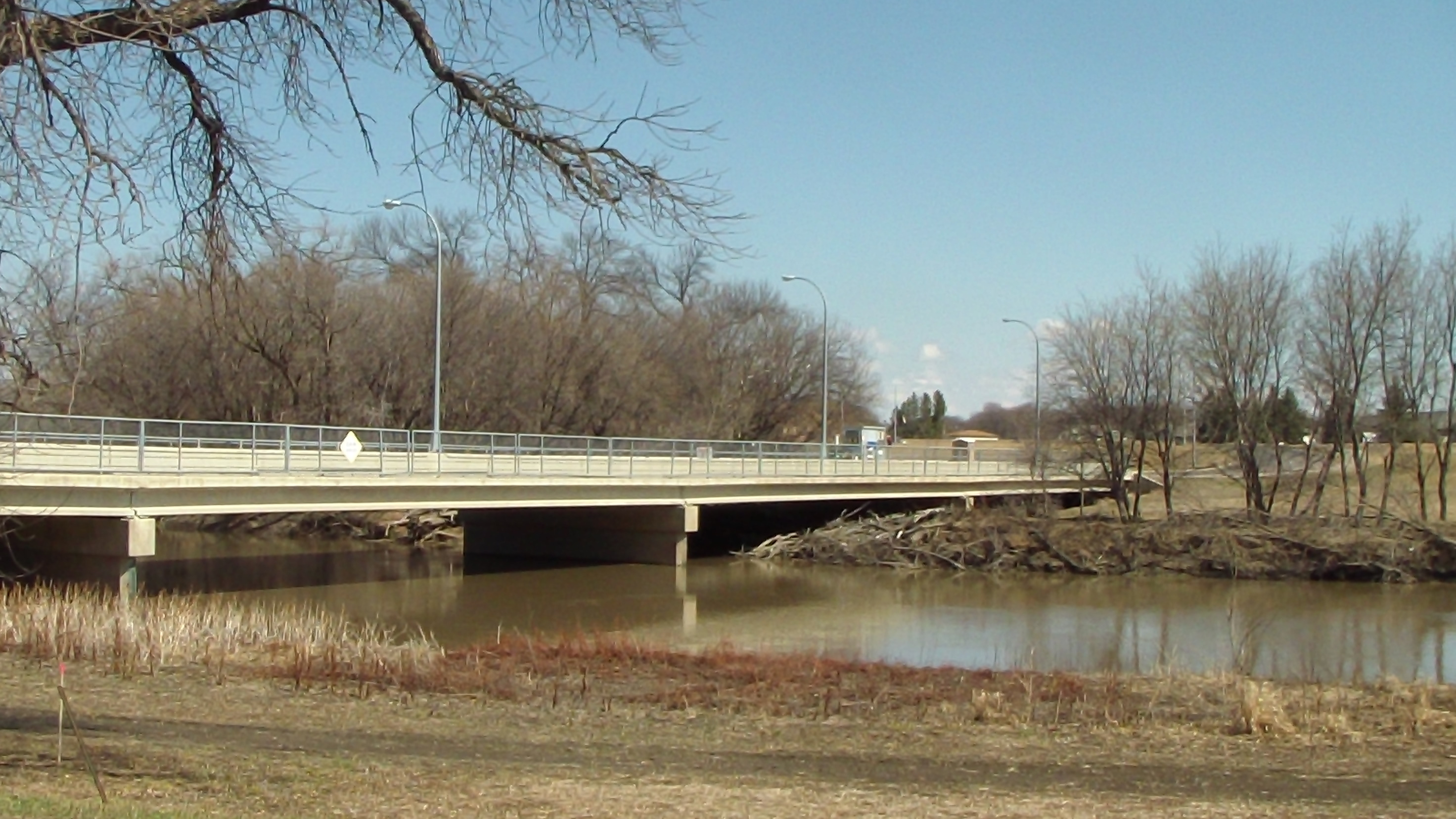
- Coordinates: 46°53′23″N 96°46′28″W
- Carries: 2 lanes of 12th Ave N/15th Ave N and pedestrian path
- Crosses: Red River
- Locale: Fargo, North Dakota; Moorhead, Minnesota
- Other name: Fargo-Moorhead Former Toll Bridge

Characteristics
- Total length: 535'
- No. of lanes: 2

History
- Opened: 1988

Statistics
- Daily traffic: 8,800

Location
- Interactive map of Fargo–Moorhead Toll Bridge

The Fargo–Moorhead Toll Bridge is a former toll bridge on the Red River of the North between Fargo, North Dakota and Moorhead, Minnesota. It connects Moorhead's 15th Avenue N with Fargo's 12th Avenue N.

The bridge was to be privately operated until June 1, 2018, following a five-year extension of its original 25-year charter in 2013. In May 2014, The City of Moorhead sued Bridge Co., the owners of the bridge; and the city of Fargo. Judge Frank Racek ruled in favor of the city of Moorhead and that the ownership of the bridge would be transferred to the two cities.

Prior to the 2014 ownership transfer, the bridge had a toll of $0.75.

== Flooding ==
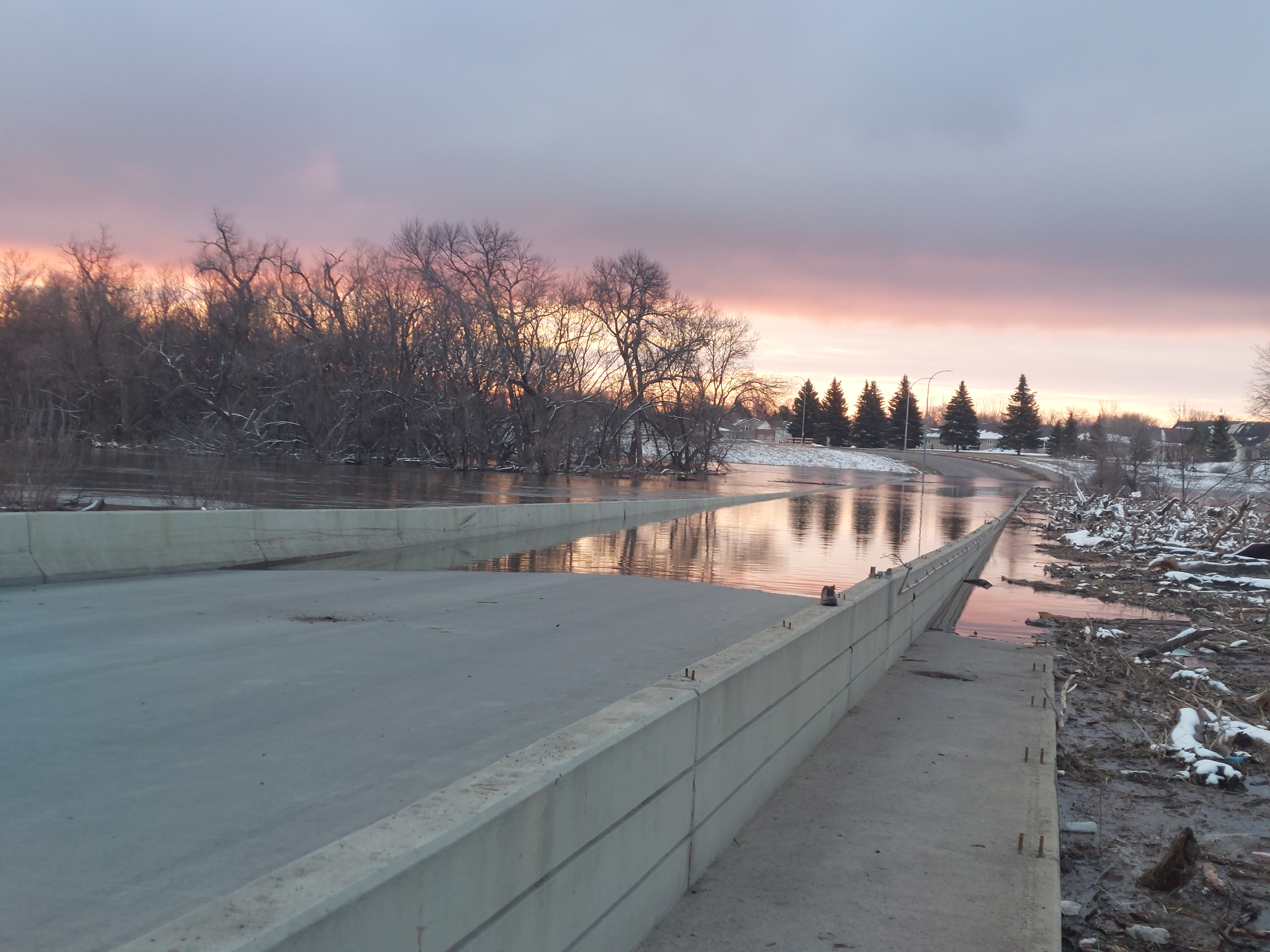
The Fargo-Moorhead Toll Bridge during the crest of the 2023 spring flooding. The water level was at 29.5', just below the threshold for a major flood as defined by the National Weather Service.

Due to the frequent flooding of the Red river, the bridge is frequently flooded. The bridge is closed when the water level reaches 28', which occurred most recently in spring of 2023.
