= Fargo, North Dakota =

Most populous city of North Dakota, U.S.

Fargo
- City
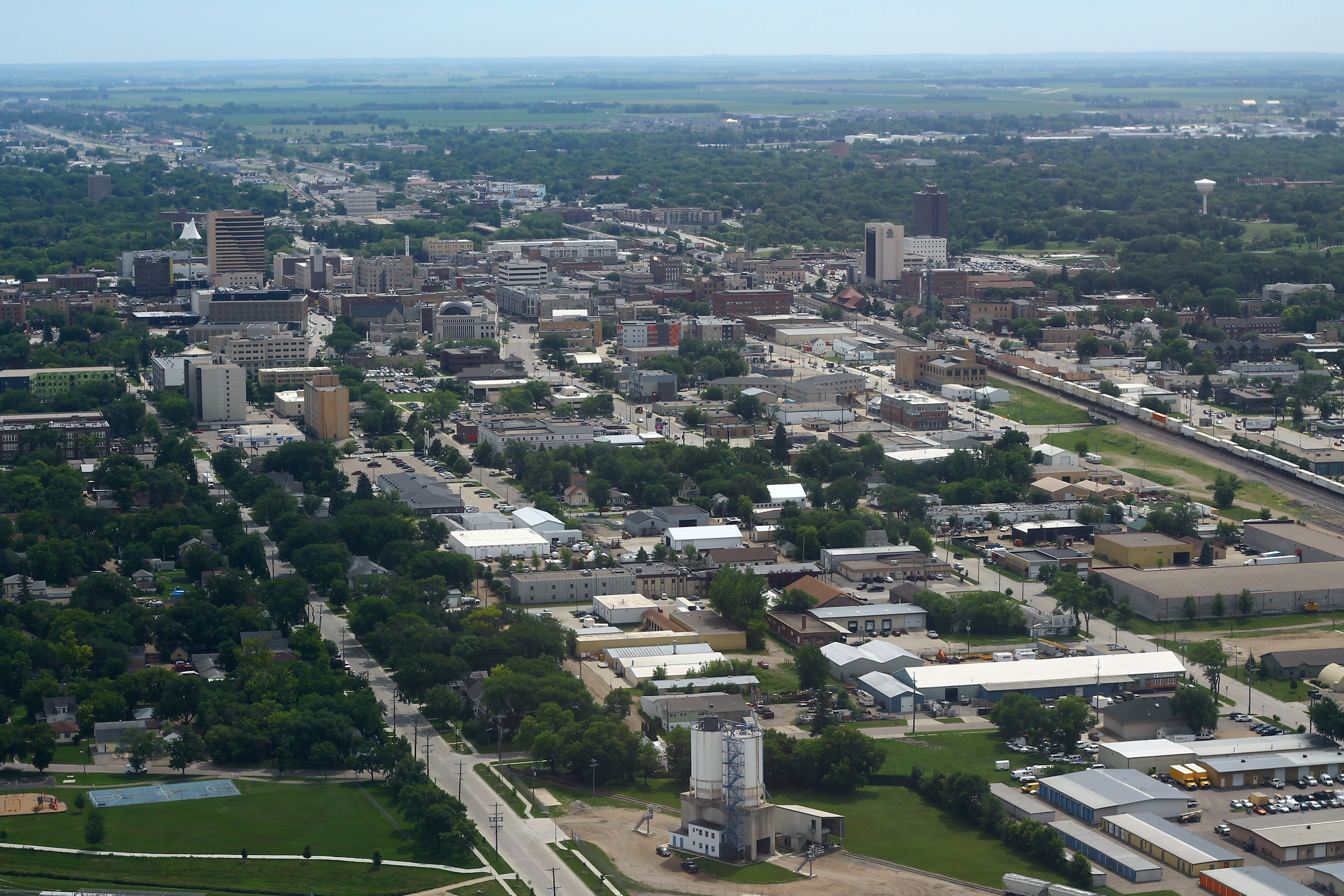
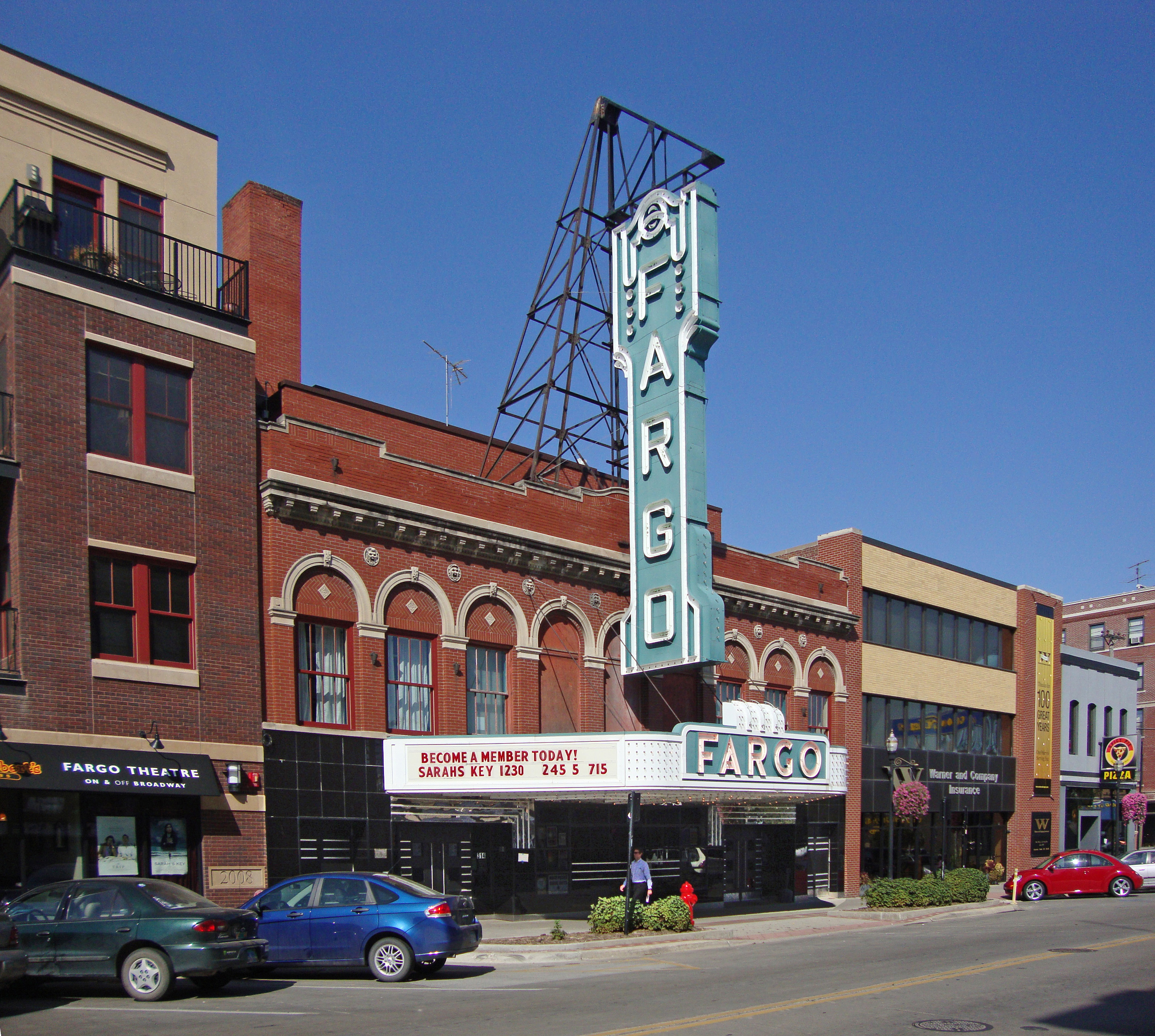
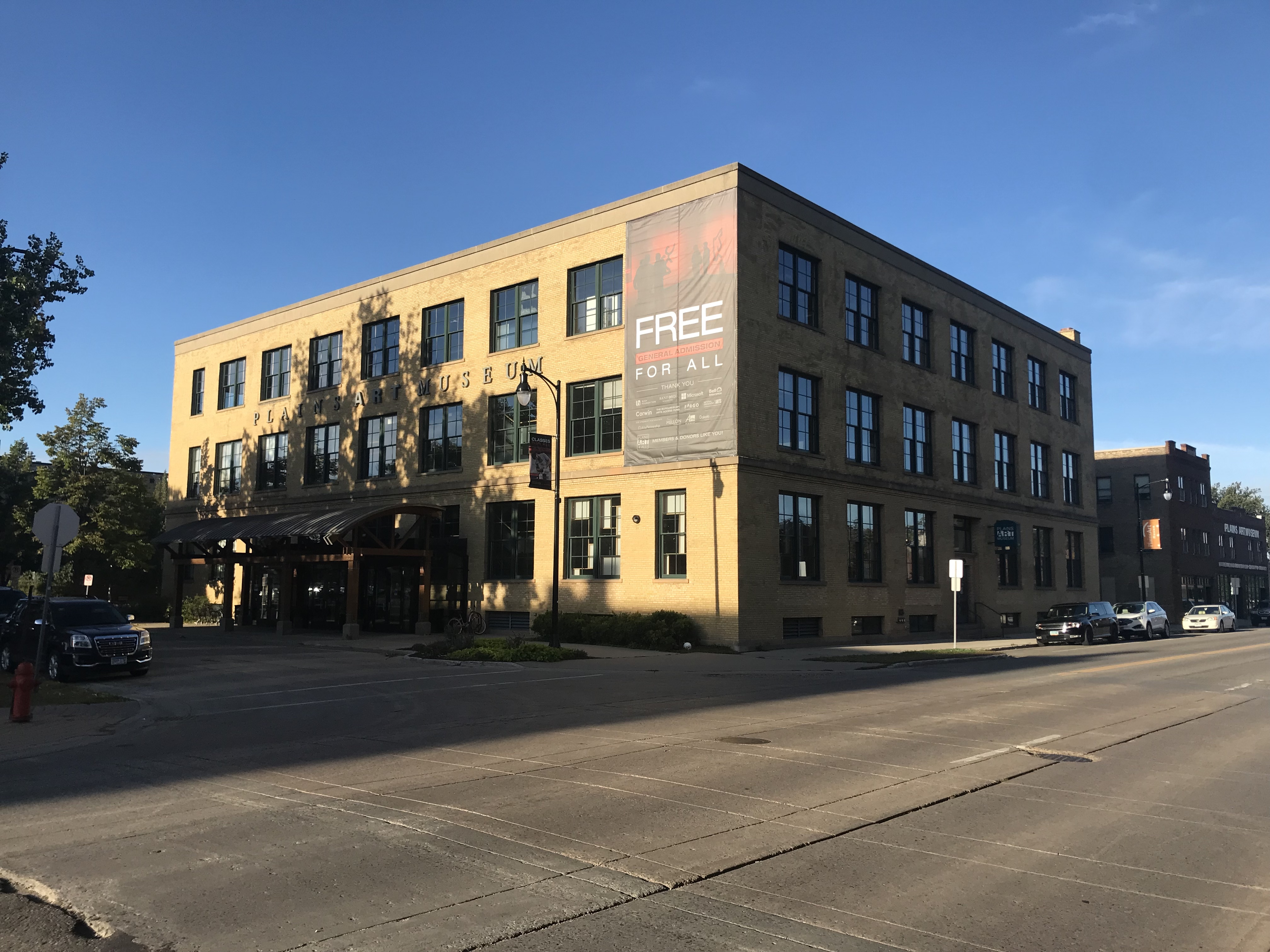
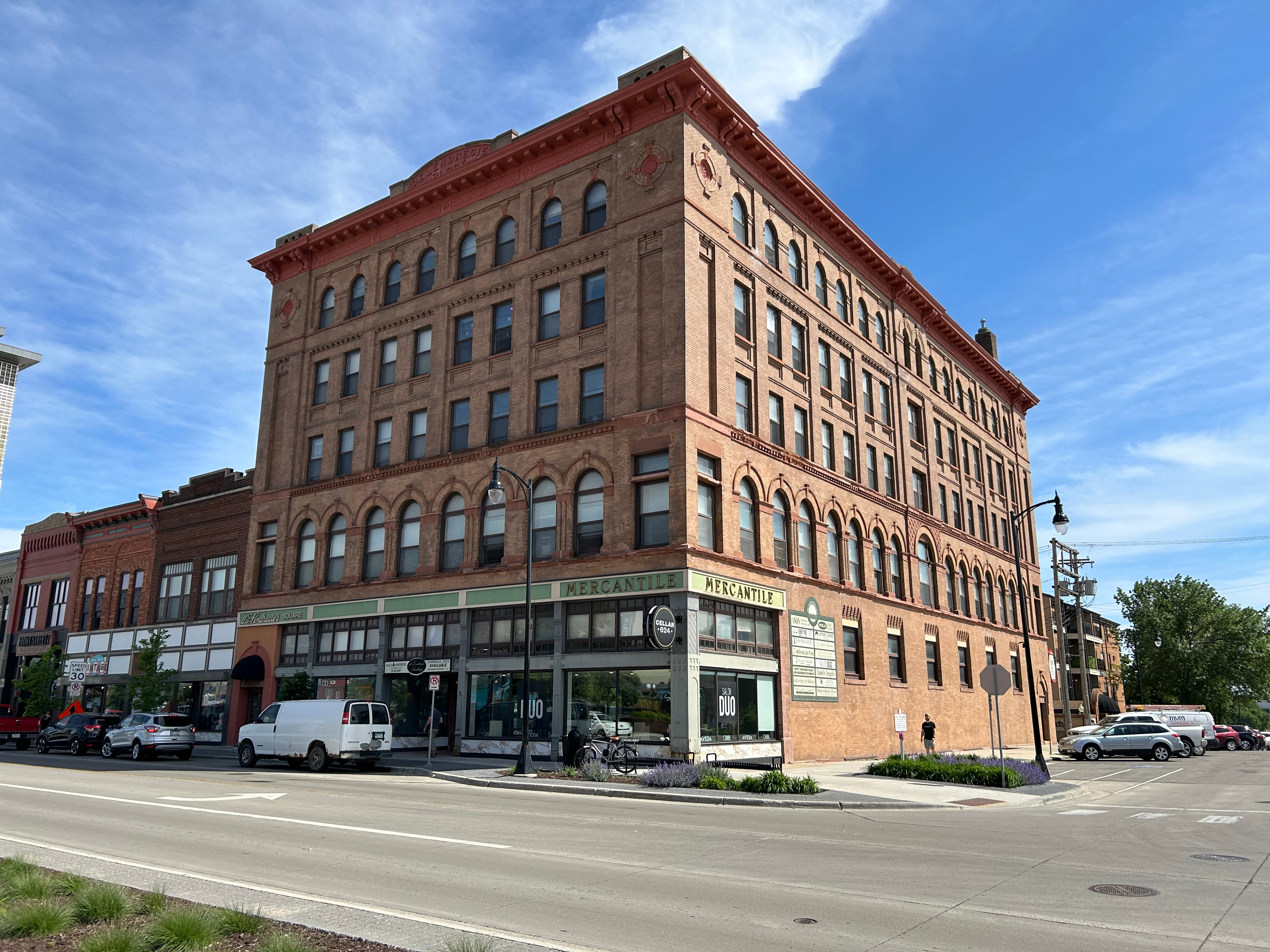
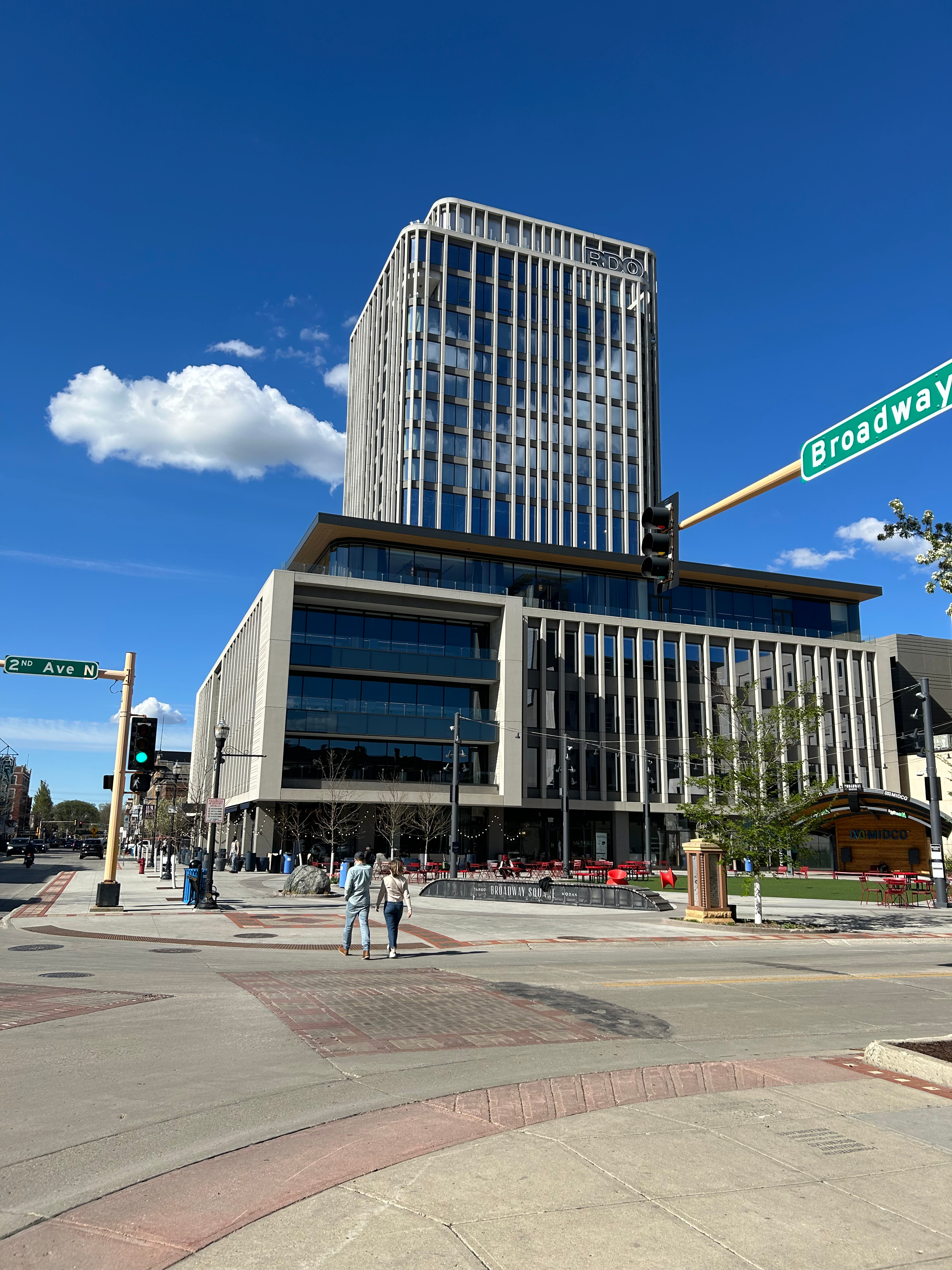
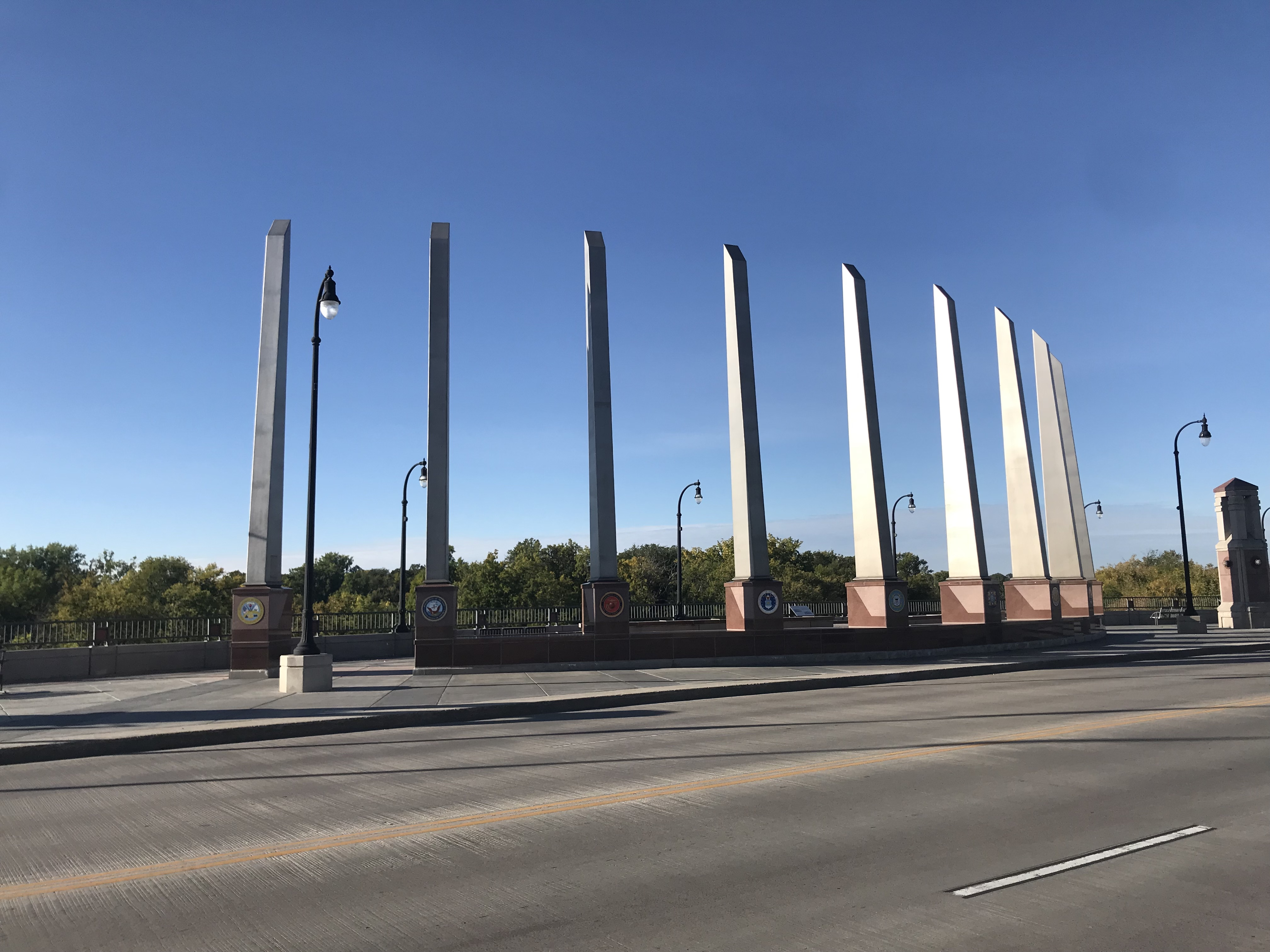
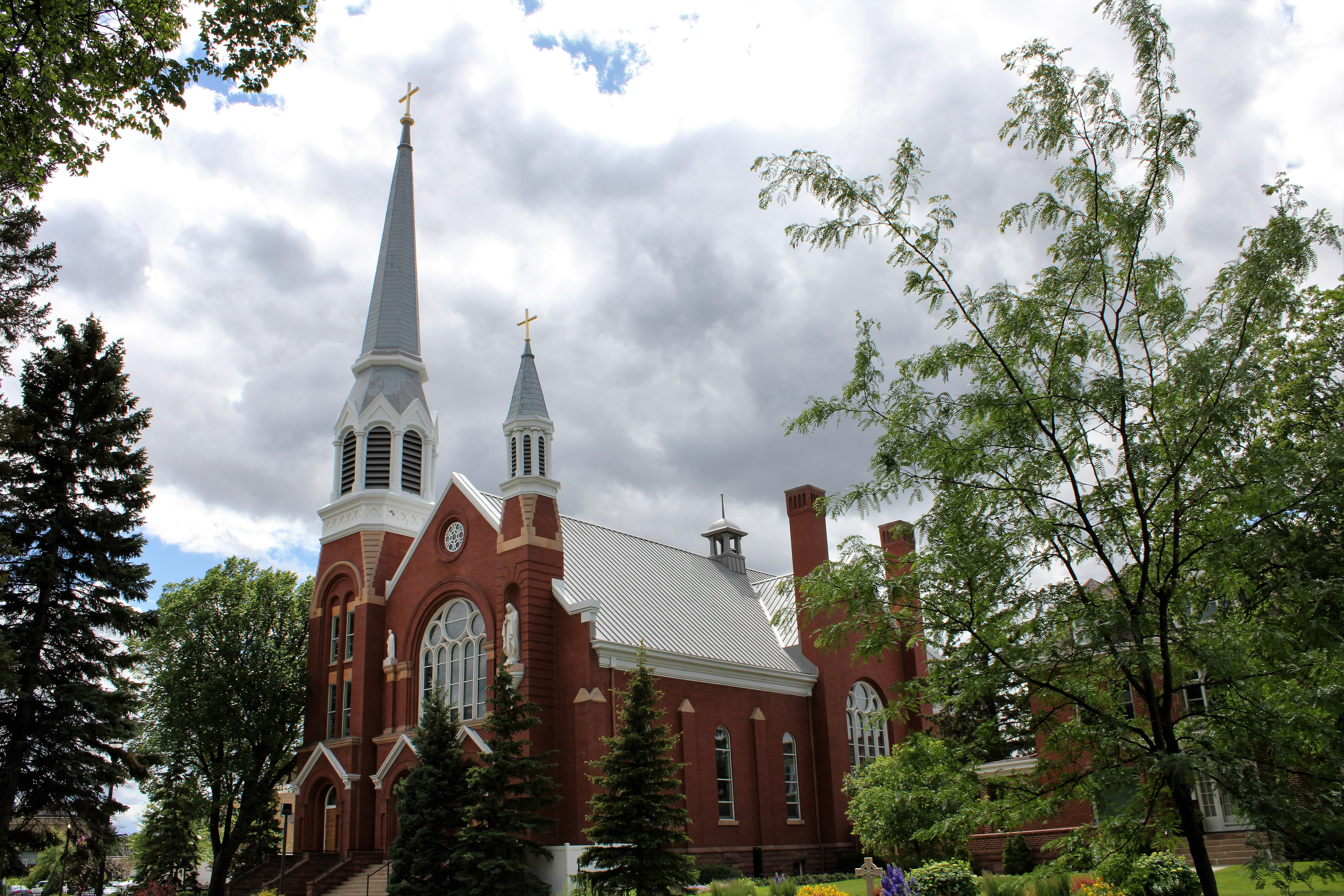
- Downtown Fargo Fargo Theatre Plains Art Museum deLendrecie's Department Store RDO Building Veterans Memorial Bridge Cathedral of St. Mary

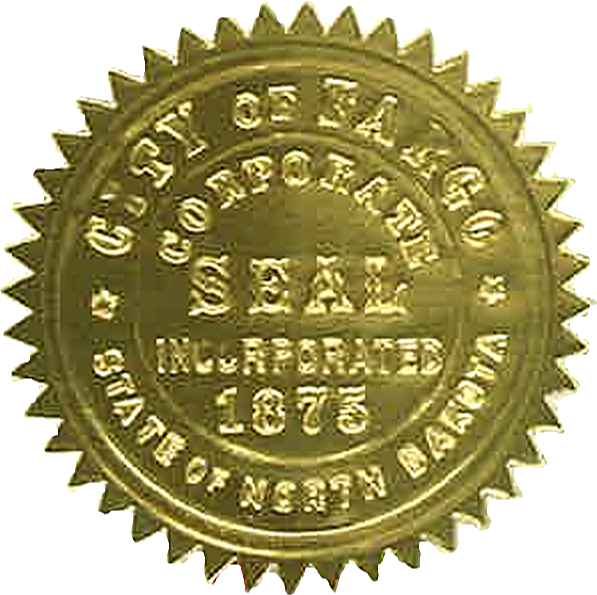
- Flag Seal Logo
- Interactive map of Fargo
- Location within North Dakota Location within the United States
- Coordinates: 46°52′24″N 96°49′38″W
- Country: United States
- State: North Dakota
- County: Cass
- Founded: 1871
- Incorporated: 1874
- Named for: William Fargo

Government
  - Type: City Commission
  - Mayor: Joshua Boschee (D-NPL)
  - Commission: Members list: Denise Kolpack; Dave Piepkorn; John Strand; Michelle Turnberg

Area
  - City: 50.835 sq mi (131.662 km^{2})
  - Land: 50.834 sq mi (131.659 km^{2})
  - Water: 0.0012 sq mi (0.003 km^{2})
- Elevation: 906 ft (276 m)

Population (2020)
  - City: 125,990
  - Estimate (2024): 136,285
  - Rank: US: 218th ND: 1st
  - Density: 2,620/sq mi (1,012/km^{2})
  - Urban: 216,214 (US: 178th)
  - Urban density: 2,780/sq mi (1,074/km^{2})
  - Metro: 262,620 (US: 189th)
  - Metro density: 93.4/sq mi (36.08/km^{2})
- Demonym: Fargoan

GDP
  - Metro: $18.792 billion (2022)
- Time zone: UTC–6 (Central (CST))
  - Summer (DST): UTC–5 (CDT)
- ZIP Codes: 58102–58109, 58121–58122, 58124–58126
- Area code: 701
- FIPS code: 38-25700
- GNIS feature ID: 1036030
- Highways: I-29, I-94, US 10, US 52, US 81
- Sales tax: 7.5%
- Website: fargond.gov

Fargo is the most populous city in the U.S. state of North Dakota. The population was 125,990 at the 2020 census and estimated at 136,285 in 2024. Fargo and its twin city of Moorhead, Minnesota, form the core of the Fargo–Moorhead metropolitan area, which had a population of 248,591 in 2020. It is the county seat of Cass County.

Fargo was founded in 1871 on the Red River of the North floodplain. It is a cultural, retail, health care, educational, and industrial center for southeastern North Dakota and northwestern Minnesota. North Dakota State University is in the city.

== History ==
=== Early history ===
Historically part of Sioux (Dakota) territory, the area that is present-day Fargo was an early stopping point for steamboats traversing the Red River during the 1870s and 1880s. The city was originally named "Centralia", but was later renamed "Fargo" after Northern Pacific Railway director and Wells Fargo Express Company founder William Fargo (1818–1881). During the initial settlement of Fargo, there developed two cities: one (unofficially) called "Fargo on the Prairie" and the other "Fargo in the Timber". "Fargo on the Prairie" was known for being well run by Northern Pacific engineers, while "Fargo in the Timber" remained mostly lawless and full of apparently "desperate and reckless characters", according to The Forum of Fargo-Moorhead. Eventually, "Fargo in the Timber" would see its demise after a crackdown by federal authorities, and the modern Fargo would develop out of "Fargo on the Prairie". The area started to flourish after the arrival of the Northern Pacific Railroad and the city became known as the "Gateway to the West."

During the 1880s, Fargo became the "divorce capital" of the Midwest because of lenient divorce laws. A major fire struck the city on June 7, 1893, destroying 31 blocks of downtown Fargo, but the city was immediately rebuilt with new buildings made of brick, new streets, and a water system. More than 246 new buildings were built within one year. There were several rumors concerning the cause of the fire.

The North Dakota Agricultural College was founded in 1890 as North Dakota's land-grant university, becoming first accredited by the North Central Association in 1915. In 1960, NDAC became known as North Dakota State University.

=== 20th century ===
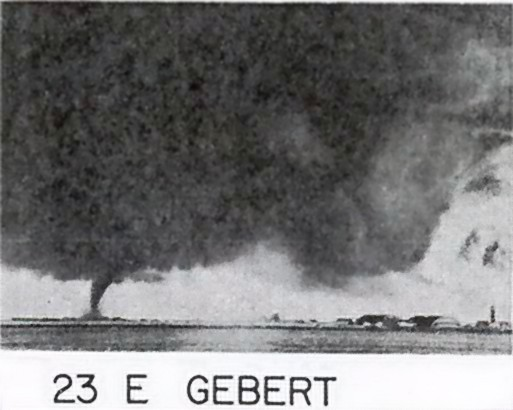
F5 tornado as it approaches Hector International Airport, 1957

Early in the century, the automobile industry flourished, and in 1905, Fargo became home to the Pence Automobile Company, a company that at one time distributed 29% of all Buicks. In addition, Fargo also hosted a regional Ford assembly plant, which by 1917 was assembling some 70 cars per day. The plant would remain in operation until 1956.

On Labor Day in 1910, Theodore Roosevelt visited Fargo to lay the cornerstone of the college's new library. To a crowd of 30,000, Roosevelt spoke about his first visit to Fargo 27 years earlier, and credited his experience homesteading in North Dakota for his eventual rise to the presidency.

Fargo-Moorhead boomed after World War II, and the city grew rapidly. In 1957, it experienced the 1957 Fargo tornado that destroyed a large part of the north end of the city. Ted Fujita, famous for his Fujita tornado scale, analyzed pictures of the Fargo tornado, helping him develop his ideas for "wall cloud" and "tail cloud." These were the first major scientific descriptive terms associated with tornadoes. The construction of two interstates (I-29 and I-94) revolutionized travel in the region and pushed growth of Fargo to the south and west of the city limits. In 1972, the West Acres Shopping Center, the largest shopping mall in North Dakota, was constructed near the intersection of the two Interstates. This mall became a catalyst for retail growth in the area.

=== Recent history ===
Fargo has continued to expand rapidly but steadily. Since the mid-1980s, the bulk of new residential growth has occurred in the south and southwest zones of the area (for example in West Fargo) due to geographic constraints on the north side. The city's major retail districts on the southwest side have likewise seen rapid development.

Downtown Fargo has been gentrified due in part to investments by the city and private developers in the Renaissance Zone. Most older neighborhoods, such as Horace Mann, have either avoided decline or been revitalized through housing rehabilitation promoted by planning agencies to strengthen the city's core.

North Dakota State University (NDSU) has grown rapidly into a major research university and forms a major component of the city's identity and economy. Most students live off-campus in the surrounding Roosevelt neighborhood. The university has established a presence downtown through both academic buildings and apartment housing. In addition, NDSU Bison Football has gained a significant following among many area residents. In recent years, Fargo has also become a regional technology and healthcare hub, as a result of Microsoft and Sanford Health both building regional campuses in the city center.

Since the late 1990s, the Fargo-Moorhead Metropolitan Statistical Area has consistently had one of the lowest unemployment rates among MSAs in the United States.

On July 14, 2023, 37-year-old Mohamad Barakat opened fire on a group of police officers in the city who were responding to an unrelated traffic accident. One officer was killed and two others were injured before Barakat was killed by one of the officers at the scene.

== Geography ==
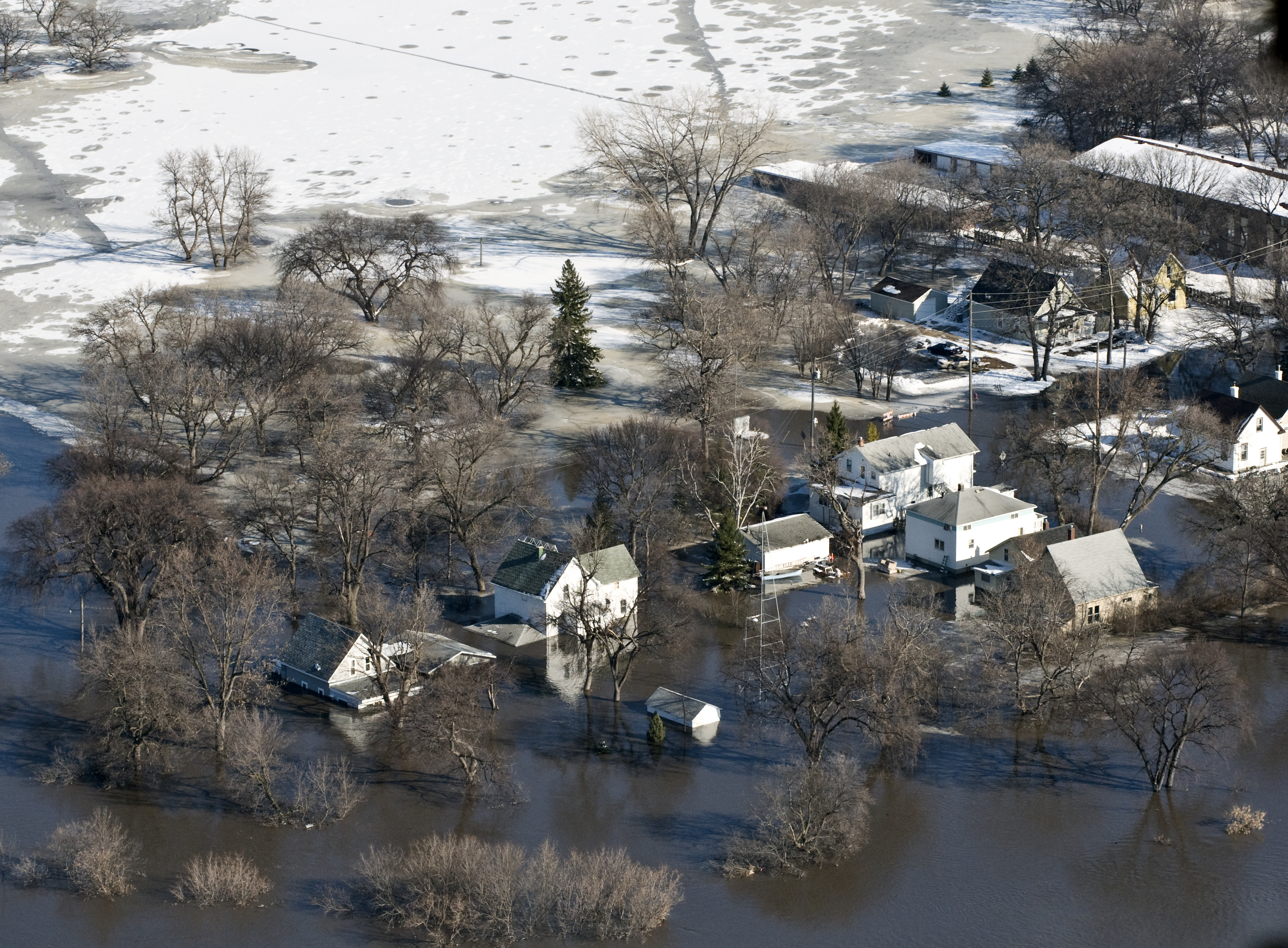
Spring flooding in Riverview area of Fargo, 2009

Fargo is a core city of the Fargo-Moorhead, ND–MN Combined Statistical Area, which also includes Moorhead, West Fargo, and Dilworth and outlying communities.

Fargo sits on the western bank of the Red River of the North in a flat geographic region known as the Red River Valley. The Red River Valley resulted from the withdrawal of glacial Lake Agassiz, which drained away about 9,300 years ago. The lake sediments deposited from Lake Agassiz made the land around Fargo some of the richest in the world for agricultural uses.

Seasonal floods due to the rising water of the Red River, which flows from the United States into Lake Winnipeg in Manitoba, Canada, have presented challenges. The Red flows northward, which means melting snow and river ice, as well as runoff from its tributaries, often create ice dams causing the river to overflow. Fargo's surrounding Red River Valley terrain is essentially flat, leading to overland flooding. Since the potentially devastating 2009 Red River flood, both Fargo and Moorhead have taken great strides in flood protection; only a near-record flood would cause concern today. Work on the FM Diversion has begun and upon completion, it will permanently floodproof the metro for 500-year floods.

Its location makes the city vulnerable to flooding during seasons with above-average precipitation. The Red River's minor flood stage in Fargo begins at a level of 18 feet, with major flooding categorized at 30 feet and above. Many major downtown roadways and access to Moorhead are closed off at this level. Record snowfalls late in 1996 led to flooding in 1997, causing the Red to rise to a record crest of 39.5 feet, nearly overtaking city defenses. In 2008–2009, significant fall precipitation coupled with rapid snowmelt in March 2009 caused the Red to rise to a new record level of 40.84 feet, but again Fargo remained safe, in large part due to flood mitigation efforts instituted after the 1997 event and sandbagging efforts by the city residents. Further upgrades were made to city infrastructure and additional resources brought to bear following the 2009 flood, which caused no issues for the city in 2010 despite another rapid melt that caused the Red to rise to 37 feet (which ranks among the top-ten highest levels ever recorded). The estimated $1.5 billion FM diversion project is under construction and will channel the Red's water away from the city. As of 2012, Fargo has bought 700 houses in flood-prone areas.

According to the United States Census Bureau, the city has a total area of 50.835 square miles (131.66 km^{2}), of which 50.834 square miles (131.66 km^{2}) is land and 0.001 square miles (0.00 km^{2}) is water.

=== Climate ===
Because of its location in the Great Plains and its distance from both mountains and oceans, Fargo has an extreme humid continental climate (Köppen Dfb, bordering on Dwb), featuring long, bitterly cold winters and warm to hot, humid summers. It lies in USDA Plant hardiness zone 4a. The city features winters among the coldest in the contiguous United States; the coldest month of January has a normal mean temperature of 9.2 °F (−12.7 °C). There is an annual average of 43 days with a minimum of 0 °F (−18 °C) or lower. Snowfall averages 51.4 inches (131 cm) per season. Spring and autumn are short and highly variable seasons. Summers have frequent thunderstorms, and the warmest month, July, has a normal mean temperature of 70.7 °F (21.5 °C); highs reach 90 °F (32 °C) on an average of 12.7 days each year. Annual precipitation of 24.0 inches (610 mm) is concentrated in the warmer months. Record temperatures have ranged from −48 °F (−44 °C) on January 8, 1887, to 114 °F (46 °C) on July 6, 1936; the record coldest daily maximum is −29 °F (−34 °C) on January 22, 1936, while, conversely, the record warmest daily minimum was 82 °F (28 °C), set four days after the all-time record high. On average, the first and last dates to see a minimum at or below the freezing mark are September 30 and May 8, respectively, allowing a growing season of 144 days.

Climate data for Fargo, North Dakota (Hector Int'l), 1991–2020 normals, (Note: Mean monthly maxima and minima (i.e. the highest and lowest temperature readings during an entire month or year) calculated based on data at said location from 1991 to 2020.) extremes 1881–present (Note: Official records for Fargo were kept at the Weather Bureau Office in Moorhead, Minnesota from January 1881 to January 1942, and at Hector Int'l since February 1942. For more information, see ThreadEx)
Month	Jan	Feb	Mar	Apr	May	Jun	Jul	Aug	Sep	Oct	Nov	Dec	Year
Record high °F (°C)	55 (13)	66 (19)	80 (27)	100 (38)	104 (40)	104 (40)	114 (46)	106 (41)	102 (39)	97 (36)	74 (23)	65 (18)	114 (46)
Mean maximum °F (°C)	39.8 (4.3)	42.0 (5.6)	57.5 (14.2)	78.3 (25.7)	88.9 (31.6)	92.4 (33.6)	92.9 (33.8)	92.2 (33.4)	89.7 (32.1)	79.5 (26.4)	59.4 (15.2)	42.6 (5.9)	95.8 (35.4)
Mean daily maximum °F (°C)	18.2 (−7.7)	22.7 (−5.2)	36.3 (2.4)	54.1 (12.3)	68.7 (20.4)	78.1 (25.6)	82.1 (27.8)	80.7 (27.1)	72.0 (22.2)	55.8 (13.2)	38.1 (3.4)	24.0 (−4.4)	52.6 (11.4)
Daily mean °F (°C)	8.6 (−13.0)	13.4 (−10.3)	27.2 (−2.7)	43.0 (6.1)	56.6 (13.7)	66.8 (19.3)	70.7 (21.5)	68.8 (20.4)	60.0 (15.6)	45.5 (7.5)	29.5 (−1.4)	15.7 (−9.1)	42.2 (5.7)
Mean daily minimum °F (°C)	1.2 (−17.1)	4.1 (−15.5)	18.1 (−7.7)	31.9 (−0.1)	44.4 (6.9)	55.6 (13.1)	59.4 (15.2)	56.8 (13.8)	48.1 (8.9)	35.2 (1.8)	20.9 (−6.2)	7.5 (−13.6)	31.8 (−0.1)
Mean minimum °F (°C)	−23.4 (−30.8)	−21.2 (−29.6)	−7.4 (−21.9)	15.9 (−8.9)	29.1 (−1.6)	42.4 (5.8)	47.3 (8.5)	44.4 (6.9)	31.7 (−0.2)	19.6 (−6.9)	1.3 (−17.1)	−17.0 (−27.2)	−25.0 (−31.7)
Record low °F (°C)	−48 (−44)	−45 (−43)	−34 (−37)	−13 (−25)	14 (−10)	28 (−2)	36 (2)	32 (0)	17 (−8)	−4 (−20)	−27 (−33)	−36 (−38)	−48 (−44)
Average precipitation inches (mm)	0.71 (18)	0.69 (18)	1.25 (32)	1.54 (39)	3.09 (78)	4.29 (109)	3.07 (78)	2.60 (66)	2.68 (68)	2.17 (55)	0.97 (25)	0.89 (23)	23.95 (608)
Average snowfall inches (cm)	10.3 (26)	8.1 (21)	9.2 (23)	4.1 (10)	0.0 (0.0)	0.0 (0.0)	0.0 (0.0)	0.0 (0.0)	0.0 (0.0)	1.2 (3.0)	6.8 (17)	11.7 (30)	51.4 (131)
Average precipitation days (≥ 0.01 in)	8.9	7.5	7.7	8.2	11.4	11.8	9.7	8.6	8.7	8.5	7.6	10.0	108.6
Average snowy days (≥ 0.1 in)	9.5	7.6	5.5	2.3	0.1	0.0	0.0	0.0	0.0	1.2	5.4	10.2	41.8
Average relative humidity (%)	73.1	74.7	76.0	65.6	60.0	66.1	66.9	66.5	69.2	68.8	75.7	76.1	69.9
Mean monthly sunshine hours	140.9	153.9	212.3	241.6	283.2	303.2	350.2	313.2	231.2	178.9	113.1	107.4	2,629.1
Percentage possible sunshine	51	53	58	59	61	64	73	71	61	53	40	40	59
Average ultraviolet index	1	2	3	5	6	8	8	7	5	3	1	1	4
Source 1: NOAA (relative humidity and sun 1961–1990)
Source 2: Weather Atlas (UV)

== Demographics ==
As of the 2022 American Community Survey, there are 56,890 estimated households in Fargo with an average of 2.14 persons per household. The city has a median household income of $64,432. Approximately 13.3% of the city's population lives at or below the poverty line. Fargo has an estimated 74.5% employment rate, with 42.4% of the population holding a bachelor's degree or higher and 95.0% holding a high school diploma.

The top nine reported ancestries (people were allowed to report up to two ancestries, thus the figures will generally add to more than 100%) were German (33.2%), Norwegian (22.6%), Irish (8.5%), English (5.1%), Subsaharan African (5.1%), French (except Basque) (3.5%), Italian (1.9%), Polish (1.8%), and Scottish (0.9%).

The median age in the city was 31.5 years.

Historical population

Year	Pop.	±%
1880	2,693	—
1890	5,664	+110.3%
1900	9,589	+69.3%
1910	14,331	+49.5%
1920	21,961	+53.2%
1930	28,619	+30.3%

Year	Pop.	±%
1940	32,580	+13.8%
1950	38,256	+17.4%
1960	46,662	+22.0%
1970	53,365	+14.4%
1980	61,383	+15.0%
1990	74,111	+20.7%

Year	Pop.	±%
2000	90,599	+22.2%
2010	105,549	+16.5%
2020	125,990	+19.4%
2023	133,188	+5.7%
2024 (est.)	136,285	+2.3%

Source: Data from U.S. Census Bureau
U.S. Decennial Census
2020 Census

=== 2020 census ===
Fargo, North Dakota – racial and ethnic composition Note: the US Census treats Hispanic/Latino as an ethnic category. This table excludes Latinos from the racial categories and assigns them to a separate category. Hispanics/Latinos may be of any race.
Race / ethnicity (NH = non-Hispanic)	Pop. 2000	Pop. 2010	Pop. 2020	% 2000	% 2010	% 2020
White alone (NH)	84,660	93,889	98,062	93.44%	88.95%	77.83%
Black or African American alone (NH)	908	2,809	10,882	1.00%	2.66%	8.64%
Native American or Alaska Native alone (NH)	1,077	1,326	1,827	1.19%	1.26%	1.45%
Asian alone (NH)	1,475	3,132	5,150	1.63%	2.97%	4.09%
Pacific Islander alone (NH)	39	41	72	0.04%	0.04%	0.06%
Other race alone (NH)	83	110	330	0.09%	0.10%	0.26%
Mixed race or multiracial (NH)	1,190	1,934	4,997	1.31%	1.83%	3.97%
Hispanic or Latino (any race)	1,167	2,308	4,670	1.29%	2.19%	3.71%
Total	90,599	105,549	125,990	100.00%	100.00%	100.00%

As of the 2020 census, there were 125,990 people, 56,116 households, and 27,239 families residing in the city. The population density was 2,529.7 inhabitants per square mile (976.7/km^{2}). There were 61,541 housing units at an average density of 1,235.7 per square mile (477.1/km^{2}). The racial makeup of the city was 78.93% White, 8.76% African American, 1.60% Native American, 4.11% Asian, 0.07% Pacific Islander, 1.20% from some other races and 5.34% from two or more races. Hispanic or Latino people of any race were 3.71% of the population. 19.4% of residents were under the age of 18, 5.9% were under 5 years of age, and 13.2% were 65 and older.

=== 2010 census ===
As of the 2010 census, there were 105,549 people, 46,791 households, and 23,075 families living in the city. The population density was 2,162.0 inhabitants per square mile (834.8/km^{2}). There were 49,956 housing units at an average density of 1,023.3 per square mile (395.1/km^{2}). The racial makeup of the city was 90.20% White, 2.70% African American, 1.38% Native American, 2.97% Asian, 0.04% Pacific Islander, 0.62% from some other races and 2.09% from two or more races. Hispanic or Latino people of any race were 2.19% of the population.

There were 46,791 households, of which 24.2% had children under the age of 18 living with them, 36.8% were married couples living together, 8.6% had a female householder with no husband present, 3.9% had a male householder with no wife present, and 50.7% were non-families. 36.6% of all households were made up of individuals, and 8.3% had someone living alone who was 65 years of age or older. The average household size was 2.15 and the average family size was 2.87.

The median age in the city was 30.2 years. 19.4% of residents were under the age of 18; 19.6% were between the ages of 18 and 24; 29% were from 25 to 44; 21.7% were from 45 to 64, and 10.1% were 65 years of age or older. The gender makeup of the city was 50.4% male and 49.6% female.

The median household income was $44,304, and the median income for a family was $69,401, with the mean family income being $89,110. The per capita income for Fargo was $29,187. About 16.0% of the population and 7.7% of families were below the poverty line.

=== 2000 census ===
As of the 2000 census, there were 90,599 people, 39,268 households, and 20,724 families residing in the city. The population density was 2,388.2 inhabitants per square mile (922.1/km^{2}). There were 41,200 housing units at an average density of 1,086.0 inhabitants per square mile (419.3/km^{2}). The racial makeup of the city was 94.17% White, 1.02% African American, 1.24% Native American, 1.64% Asian, 0.04% Pacific Islander, 0.44% from some other races and 1.45% from two or more races. Hispanic or Latino people of any race were 1.29% of the population.

The top seven ancestry groups in the city are German (40.6%), Norwegian (35.8%), Irish (8.6%), Swedish (6.5%), English (5.2%), French (4.7%), and Italian (3.6%).

There were 39,268 households, of which 26.5% had children under the age of 18 living in them, 41.8% were married couples living together, 7.8% had a female householder with no husband present, and 47.2% were non-families. 34.6% of all households were made up of individuals and 8.0% had someone living alone who was 65 years of age or older. The average household size was 2.20 and the average family size was 2.91.

In the city, 21.1% of the population was under the age of 18, 19.2% was from 18 to 24, 31.1% from 25 to 44, 18.5% from 45 to 64, and 10.1% was 65 years of age or older. The median age was 30 years. For every 100 females there were 100.0 males. For every 100 females age 18 and over, there were 99.3 males.

As of the 2000 the median income for a household in the city was $35,510, and the median income for a family was $50,486. Males had a median income of $31,968 versus $22,264 for females. The per capita income for the city was $21,101. About 6.6% of families and 11.8% of the population were below the poverty line, including 10.8% of those under age 18 and 7.5% of those age 65 or over.

== Economy ==
The economy of the Fargo area has historically been dependent on agriculture. That dominance has decreased substantially in recent decades. Today the city of Fargo has a growing economy based on food processing, manufacturing, technology, retail trade, higher education, and healthcare.

=== Top employers ===
According to the city's 2025 Annual Comprehensive Financial Report, the principal employers in the city are:

#	Employer	Type of Business	# of Employees (FTE)
1	Sanford Health	Medical/Health Care	6,278
2	Essentia Health	Medical/Health Care	2,848
3	West Fargo Public Schools	Education	2,541
4	North Dakota State University	Higher Education	2,167
5	Fargo Public Schools	Education	2,064
6	VA Health Care System	Medical/Health Care	1,380
7	City of Fargo	Government	1,125
8	Coborns Inc. (Hornbacher's & Cash Wise Foods)	Retail Grocery	1,070
9	Scheels	Retail	723
10	Noridian	Insurance	509

== Arts and culture ==
The Winter Carnival in Fargo is a tradition that began in 1928. The annual Downtown Fargo Street Fair is a celebration that brings together an array of arts, crafts, and culinary experiences. This event is North Dakota's largest free outdoor gathering.

The North Dakota Horse Park offers live horse racing and betting opportunities. The Red River Zoo, covering 30-acre (12 ha) houses 80 species of animals and also features a restored 1928 carousel. West Acres Shopping Center is a large retail complex with over 120 stores, spanning approximately 950,000 square feet.

=== Museums ===
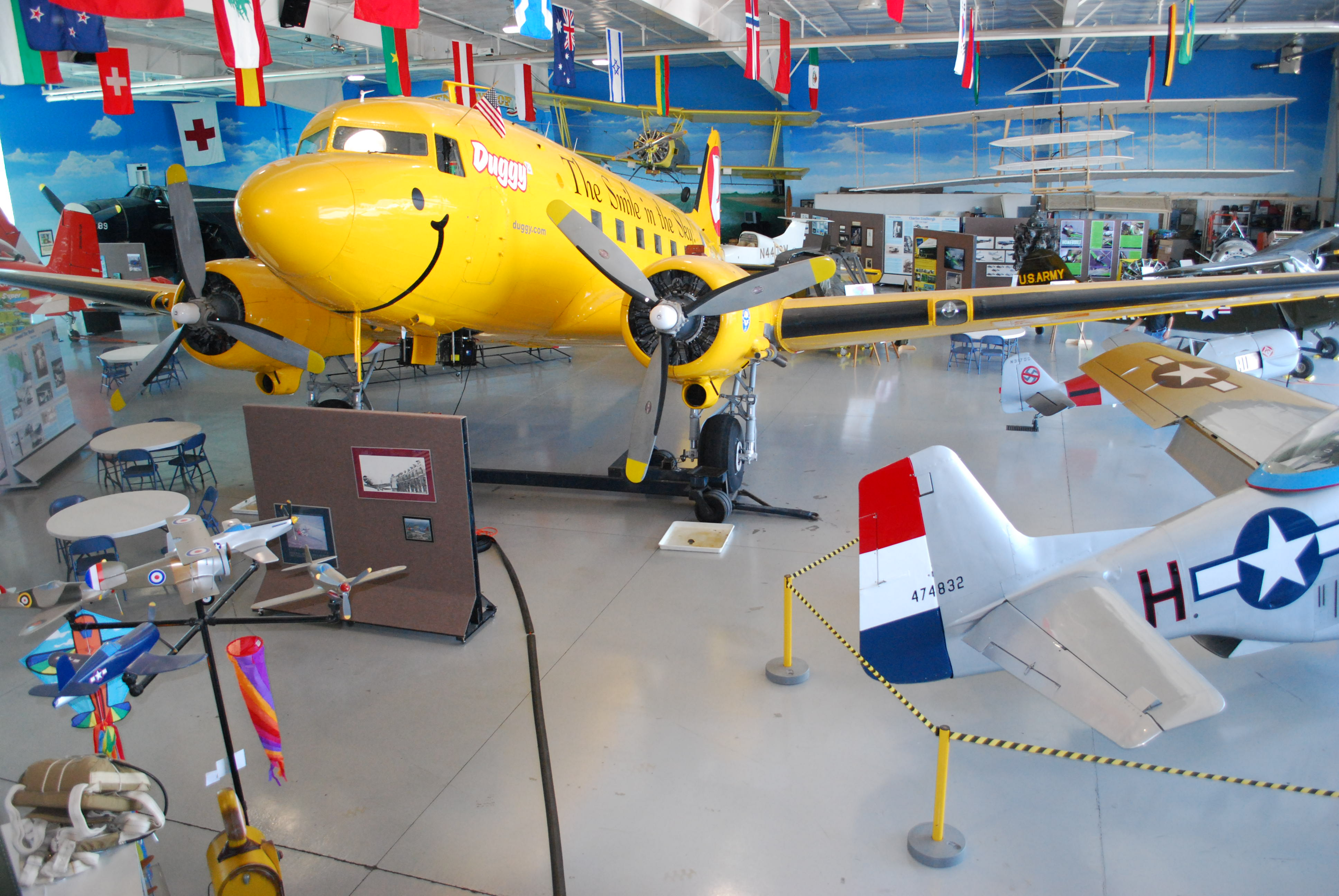
Fargo Air Museum

The Fargo area is home to a range of museums and theaters that reflect the region's history and cultural interests. The Fargo Air Museum showcases aircraft from World War II and later periods, and it also hosts traveling exhibits. The Plains Art Museum, located in a historic downtown building, offers a variety of regional and national art exhibitions. The Roger Maris Museum, situated within the West Acres Shopping Center, is dedicated to Roger Maris, the New York Yankees player who spent part of his life in Fargo. The museum features memorabilia related to Maris and includes a video presentation of his career.

The Children's Museum at Yunker Farm closed in 2021 after being open for 30 years, but the rest of the property is still open to the public and is in the process of being revitalized.

=== Performing arts ===
The Fargo-Moorhead Community Theatre offers a variety of productions, including comedies, dramas, youth shows, and musicals, staged at a venue in Island Park, south of downtown Fargo. The Fargo Theatre is a restored 1926 Art Deco movie house that features first-run movies, film festivals, and other community events. The Fargodome routinely hosts concerts, Broadway musicals, dance performances, sporting events, as well as fairs and other gatherings. The Fargo-Moorhead Opera presents two to three productions each year. Other music organizations in the area include the Fargo-Moorhead Symphony Orchestra and the Fargo-Moorhead Youth Symphony. Fargo also has a dance company in the Fargo-Moorhead Ballet.

=== Libraries ===
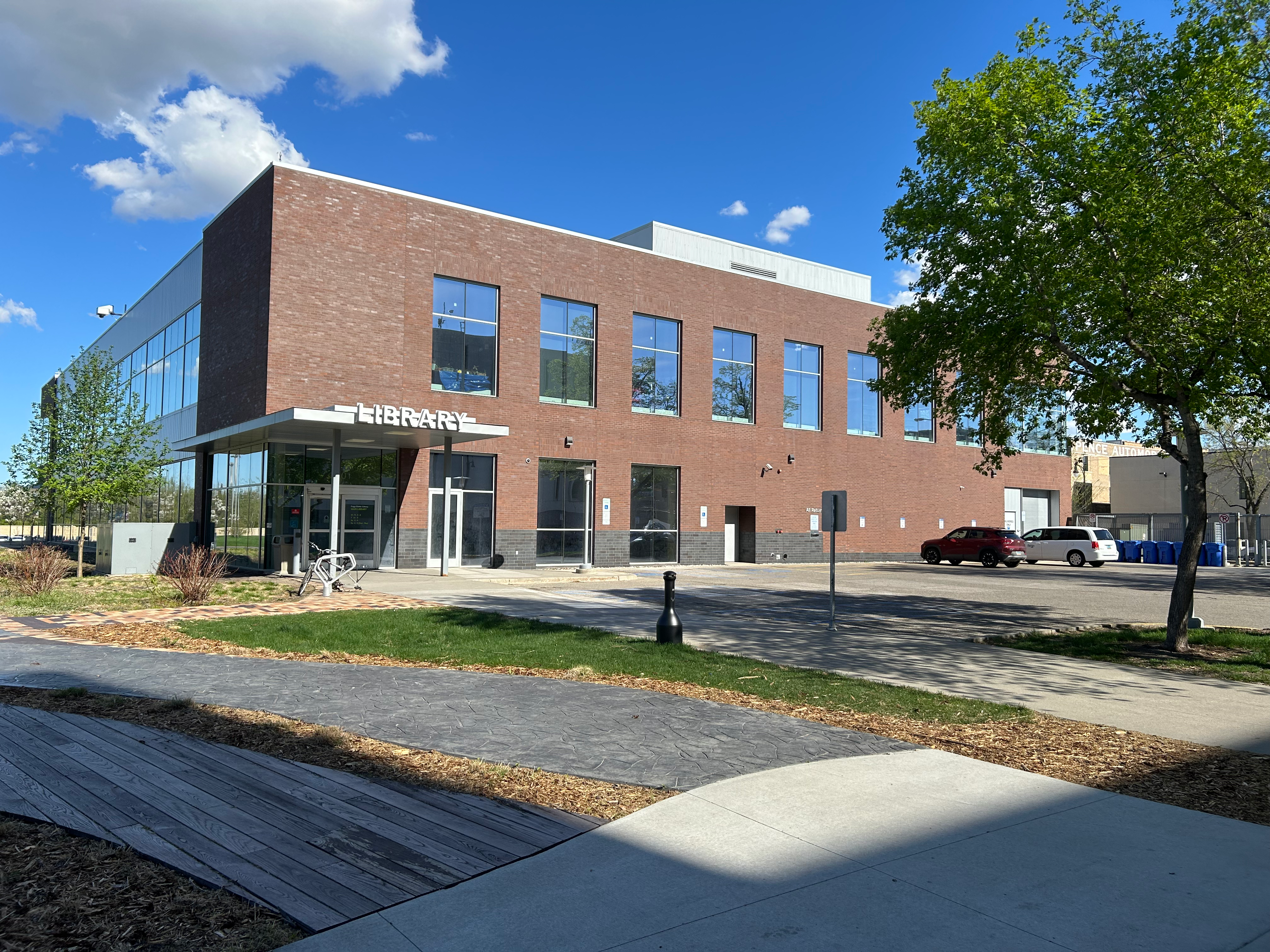
Current Main Fargo Public Library

The Fargo Public Library was established in 1900 and for many years was housed in a Carnegie-funded building. In 1968, the library moved into a new facility as part of urban renewal efforts in the downtown area. The original 1968 building was demolished and replaced with a new library which opened in 2009. In addition, Fargo Public Library operates the Dr. James Carlson Library in south Fargo, and the Northport branch in north Fargo. In 2002 and 2006, the Southpointe and Northport Branches were opened serving the city's south and north sides. The Dr. James Carlson Library, which replaced the earlier Southpointe Branch, opened to the public on November 16, 2007. A new downtown Main Library opened April 25, 2009. The Fargo Public Library is headquartered in downtown Fargo.

In 2014, over 1 million items were checked out from Fargo Public Library. Books and magazines made up nearly half of the total and digital media and other non-print items made up more than a third. The rest were inter-library loans and renewals.

=== Tallest buildings ===
The tallest buildings in Fargo include:

1. RDO Building (height: 234 ft; 71 m built 2018–2020, 18 floors) Formally known as the Block 9 Tower. As of 2019 it is the second tallest building in North Dakota.
2. Radisson Hotel (height: 206 ft 8 in; 63 m, built 1985, 18 floors)
3. Sanford Medical Center (built 2012–2017, 11 floors)
4. Cathedral of St. Mary (height: 170 ft 3 in; 52 m, built 1899)
5. First Lutheran Church (height: 167 ft 4 in; 51 m, built 1920)
6. Sts. Anne and Joachim Catholic Church (height: 130 ft, built 1995–2010)
7. Fargodome (height: 125 ft; 38 m, built 1992)
8. Bell Bank Tower (height: 122 ft, built 1973, 10 stories), formerly the Bank of the West Tower, purchased by Bell Bank in 2021.
9. Black Building (height: 108 ft 0 in; built 1931) Tallest building in North Dakota from 1931 to 1934 when the new ND Capitol building was completed at 241 feet high, which as of April 2021, remains the tallest building in the state today.

Fargo is not particularly known for having large structures, primarily due to the rich but structurally-weak soil. This soil is the result of the Red River Valley being the home of glacial Lake Agassiz.

== Sports ==
- North Dakota State Bison, an NCAA Division I university with 14 varsity sports and club sports. North Dakota State's football team won five consecutive FCS National Championships between 2011 and 2015, and three more in 2017, 2018, and 2019 and hosted ESPN's College GameDay (in downtown Fargo) in 2013 and 2014. NDSU Bison play at the Fargodome.
- Fargo-Moorhead RedHawks Independent Baseball Organization started in 1996 and is a 5 Time Northern League Champion and current member of the American Association. They play at the Newman Outdoor Field in North Fargo.
- Fargo Post#2 of the North Dakota American Legion baseball league, which is held at the Jack Williams Stadium in North Fargo.
- Fargo Marathon is an annual road running marathon, which started in 2005. Most years, it starts and ends at the Fargodome in North Fargo.
- Fargo Force, a tier 1 USHL hockey team that plays at the Scheels Arena in South Fargo.
- Fargo Moorhead Derby Girls (FMDG) women's roller derby league was founded in May 2009 and plays at the Skate City in South Fargo. Every game in their 2009–2010 season was sold out.

== Parks and recreation ==
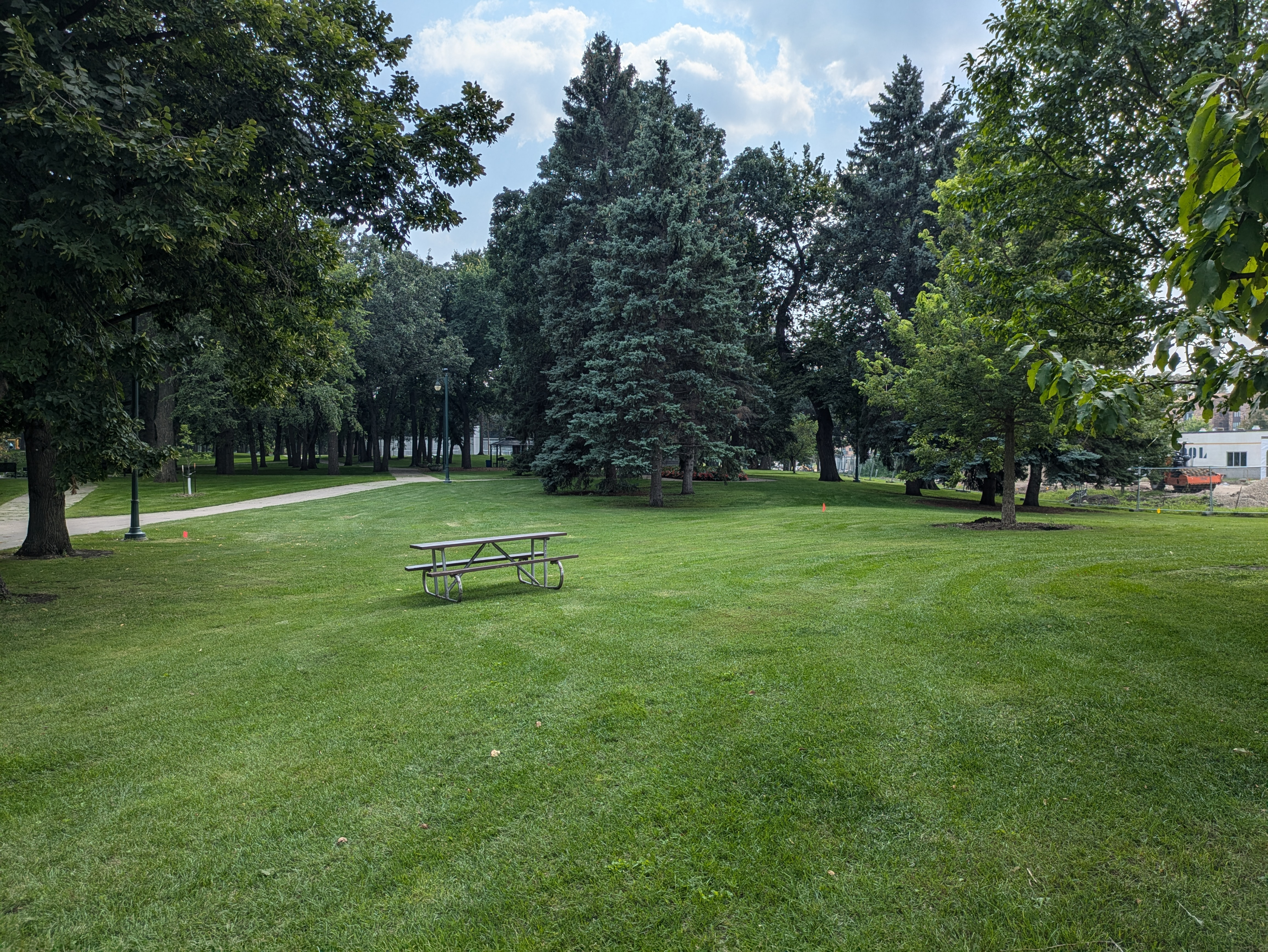
Island Park

The front of The Fargo Parks Sports Center

The Fargo Park District operates many neighborhood parks throughout the city. The Fargo area contains the following golf courses: Edgewood Golf Course (18-hole), Fargo Country Club (18-hole) Rose Creek Golf Course (18-hole), El Zagal (9-hole), Prairiewood Golf Course (9-hole), and the new Osgood Golf Course (9-hole). In the winter Edgewood serves as a warming house and also provides cross country skis. Rose Creek and Osgood golf courses offer golfing lessons in the summer months. Fargo also has a skate park near dike west and Island park. Fargo and sister city Moorhead also hold ferry rides during the summer, on the historic Red River, to promote education of the fertile soil of the Red River Valley. In January of 2025, the second phase of The Fargo Parks Sports Center was completed for a price tag of $127.5 million. The building is 400,000 square feet and features a multi-sport turf field, an elevated track, eight hardwood courts, two ice rinks, and six pickleball courts. The facility was constructed to meet the community's need for indoor recreation during the long winters.

=== Arenas and auditoriums ===
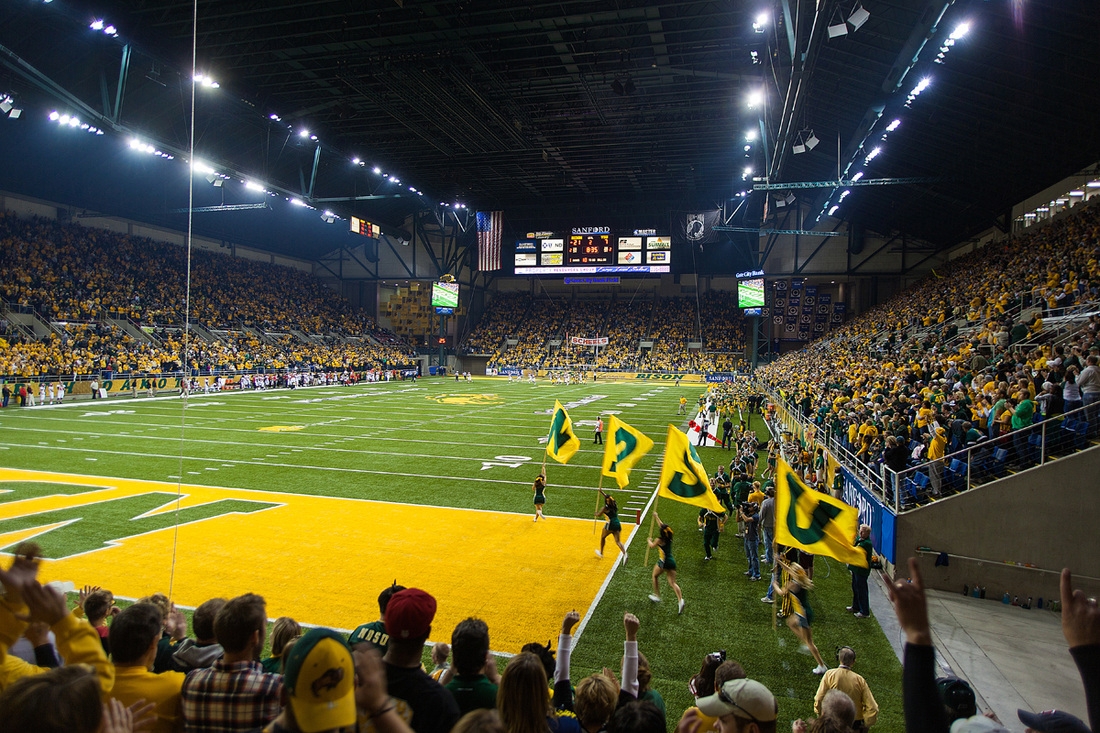
The Fargodome at a North Dakota State Bison game

The Fargodome is an indoor arena on the North Dakota State University campus. Owned by the city, it plays host to all NDSU home football games and is also used for concerts and trade shows. The facility also hosts the high school wrestling national freestyle and Greco-Roman championships take place every year. Newman Outdoor Field hosts the Fargo-Moorhead RedHawks and NDSU Bison baseball on the NDSU campus. Reineke Fine Arts Center on the NDSU campus is used for concerts, theatrical presentations, and other events.

The Fargo Civic Center is an indoor arena used to host trade shows, sporting events, meetings, community events, concerts, and disaster relief.

John E. Carlson Coliseum, opened in 1969, is the home of the North Dakota State University ice hockey club team of the American Collegiate Hockey Association. It was the former home to the Fargo-Moorhead Jets, the Fargo North Spartans, and the Fargo South Bruins ice hockey teams.

In 2007, Fargo held a groundbreaking for the $25 million Scheels Arena. Its main tenant is the Fargo Force of the United States Hockey League, in addition to Fargo high school hockey and other concerts and special events.

== Government ==
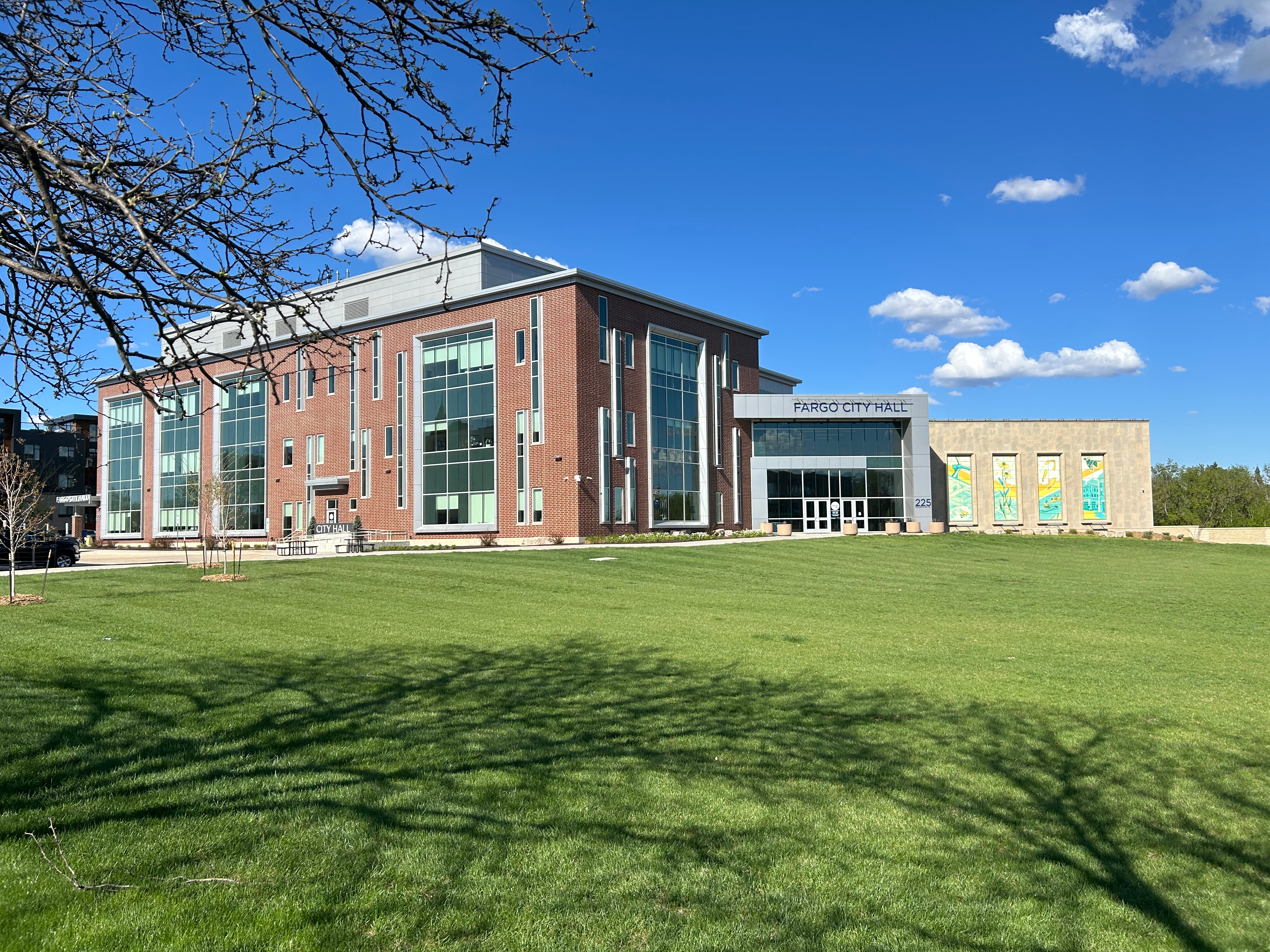
Fargo City Hall

Fargo uses the city commission style of local government. Four commissioners and a mayor are elected via approval voting. Fargo became the first city in the U.S. to use approval voting for elections in 2018. The Fargo City Commission meets every two weeks in its chambers above the Fargo Civic Center. The meetings are broadcast on a Government-access television (GATV) cable channel.

In 2017, there was an attempt to recall City Commissioner Dave Piepkorn by a group who argued his constant expressing of concern over refugee resettlement in the city was a xenophobic dog-whistle meant to rile up anti-refugee sentiment in the community. While the group says it did reach the required number of signatures, it ultimately chose not to submit them because they did not know how many signatures would be eliminated in the review process, and Commissioner Piepkorn threatened to obtain the list of signers via FOIA request, which was interpreted as a political threat by the group.

== Education ==
=== Primary and secondary schools ===
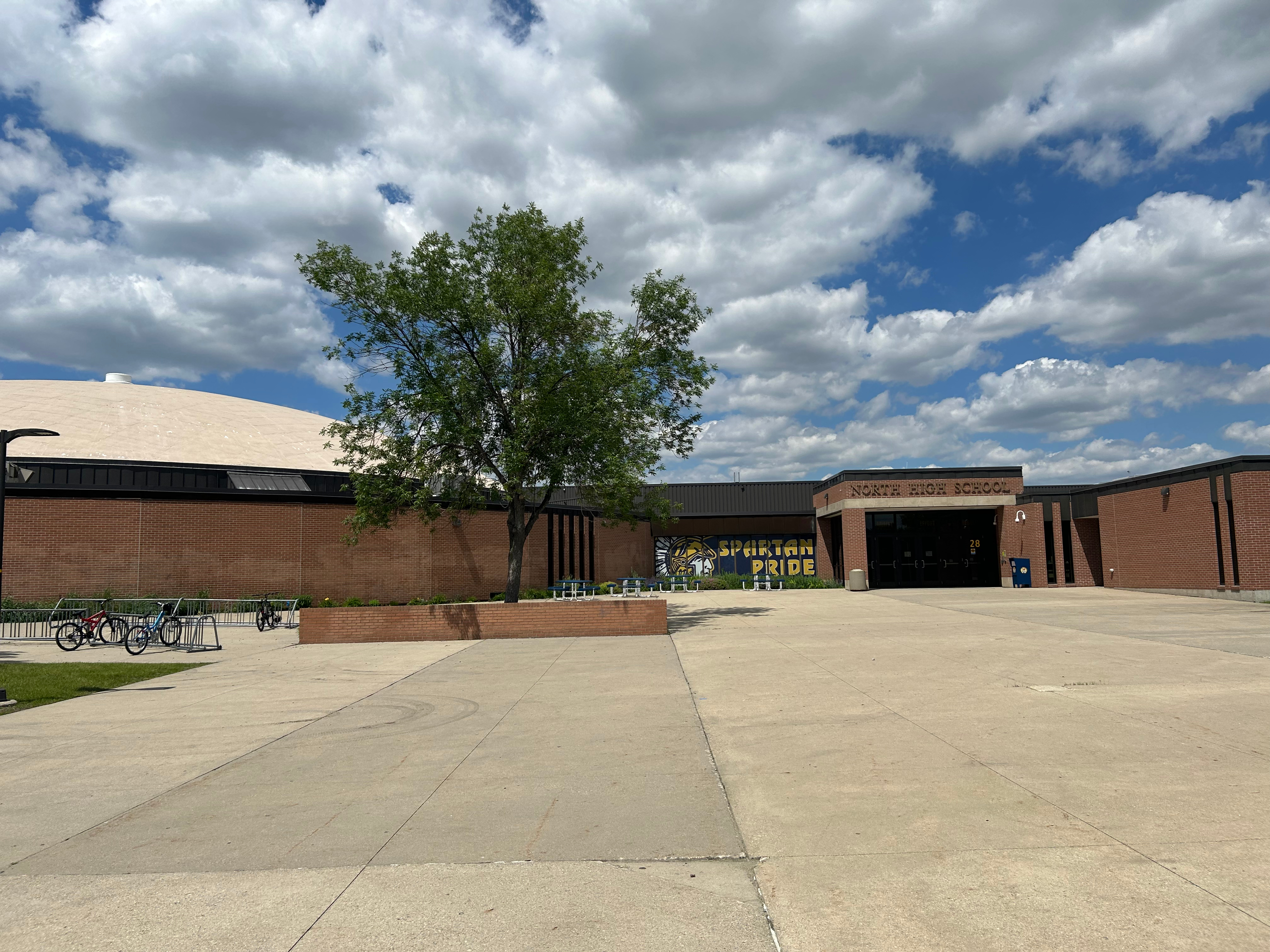
Fargo North High School

The Fargo Public Schools system serves most of the city, operating fifteen elementary schools, three middle schools, and four high schools: Fargo North High School, Fargo South High School, Davies High School, and an Dakota High School (an alternative high school). The original high school in the city was Central High School.

The West Fargo Public Schools system serves the southwestern part of the city, in addition to West Fargo itself and the surrounding communities of Horace and Harwood.

In addition to public schools, a number of private schools also operate in the city. The John Paul II Catholic Schools Network operates Holy Spirit Elementary, Nativity Elementary, Trinity Elementary in West Fargo, North Dakota, Sacred Heart Middle School, and Shanley High School. Additionally, the Oak Grove Lutheran School and Park Christian School (which is in Moorhead, Minnesota) serve grades Pre-K through 12, while Grace Lutheran School serves grades Pre-K through 8.

=== Higher education ===
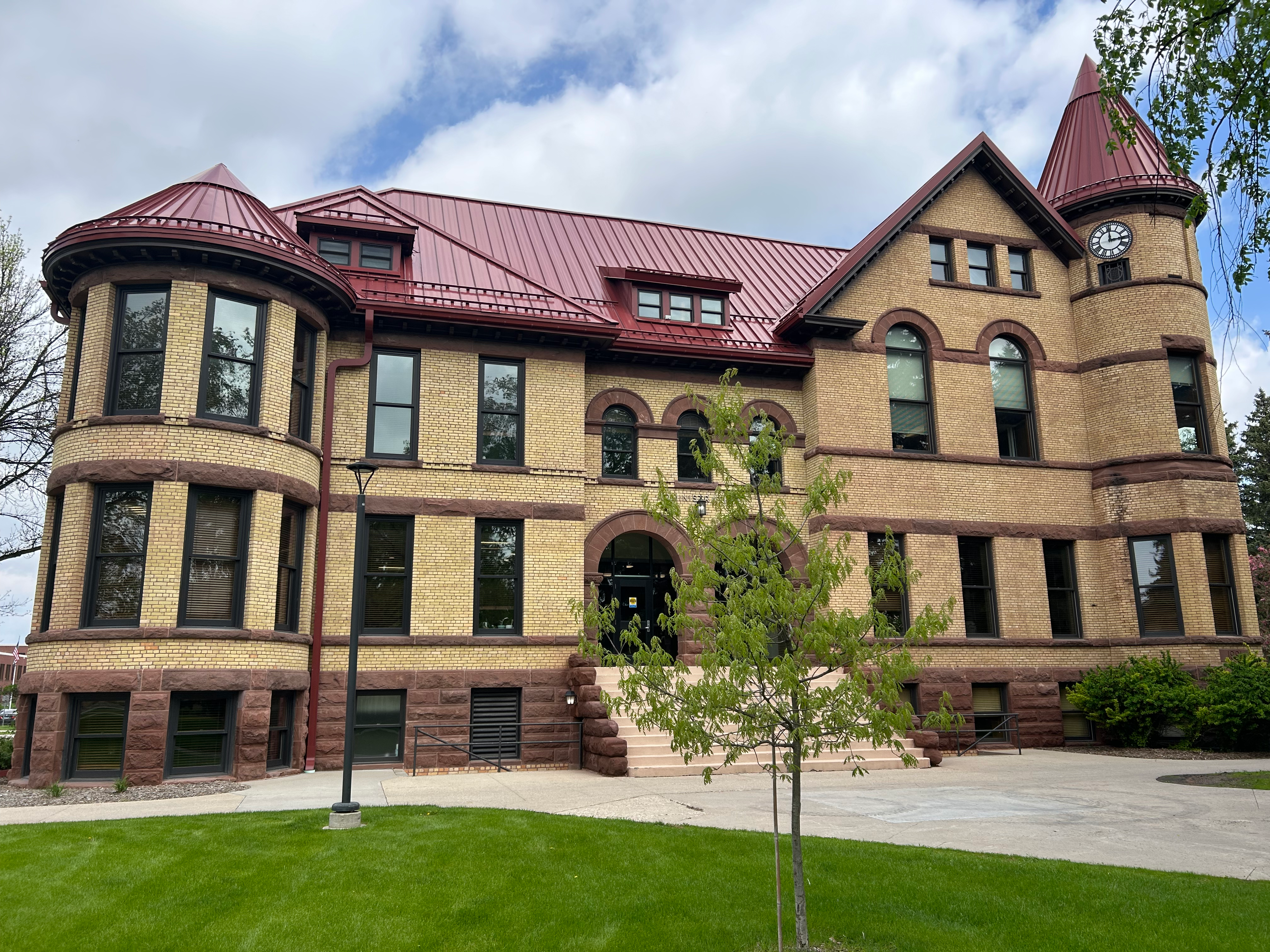
Old Main on the campus of North Dakota State University

Fargo is home to North Dakota State University (NDSU), which has over 14,500 students. NDSU was founded in 1890 as the state land grant university focusing on agriculture, engineering and science, but has since branched out to cover many other fields of study. NDSU, along with Minnesota State University Moorhead and Concordia College in Moorhead, form the Tri-College University system of Fargo-Moorhead. Students can take classes at any of the three institutions. These three colleges also form a vibrant student-youth community of over 25,000. NDSCS-Fargo is a campus of North Dakota State College of Science. Located in the Skills and Technology Training Center on 19th Avenue North in Fargo, NDSCS-Fargo serves as the home to academic programming and non-credit training.

Fargo is also home to several private collegiate institutions, including Rasmussen University, a branch location of the University of Mary, and Master's Baptist College operated by Fargo Baptist Church. The University of Jamestown's Doctor of Physical Therapy program is based in Fargo.

== Media ==
The Forum of Fargo–Moorhead is the city's major newspaper. The High Plains Reader, an independent weekly newspaper, also operates in the community. North Dakota State University's student paper, The Spectrum, is printed twice weekly during the academic year. The city is also served by other publications such as Area Woman, From House To Home, Bison Illustrated, OPEN Magazine, Meet Fargo, Fargo INC!, Faces of Fargo-Moorhead-West Fargo, and Valley Faith.

Fargo is also home to several radio and television stations. Gray Television owns NBC affiliate KVLY-TV and CBS affiliate KXJB-LD, and Coastal Television Broadcasting Company owns Fox affiliate KVRR. Forum Communications, which also owns The Forum, owns ABC affiliate WDAY-TV. Major Market Broadcasting owns MyNetworkTV affiliate KRDK-TV, which was formerly CBS affiliate KXJB. Prairie Public Broadcasting operates KFME-TV, a PBS station, and also operates NPR affiliate KDSU-FM (however, KDSU is owned by North Dakota State University). Midwest Communications operating under Midwest Radio of Fargo-Moorhead, owns KFGO-AM/FM, KVOX-FM, KOYY, KRWK and KNFL. Conservative talk host Scott Hennen owns WZFG and WDAY radio, and Great Plains Integrated Marketing owns KQLX, KQLX-FM and KEGK. Local resident James Ingstad operates eight radio stations under RFM Media, including KBVB, KPFX, KLTA, KQWB-FM, KQWB-AM, KBMW-FM, and K233CY.

KNDS 96.3 FM is an FCC approved radio station, owned with a license held by the independent Alliance for the Arts, operating on the 96.3 frequency in Fargo, North Dakota and the surrounding area. KNDS strives to provide the area with independent music not heard elsewhere in the FM radio community, while maintaining an emphasis on community/area partnership. North Dakota State University's ThunderRadio club operates the station

KRFF-LP is a local, non-profit, listener-supported independent radio station serving the Fargo-Moorhead area. Radio Free Fargo previously worked to run KNDS.

== Transportation ==
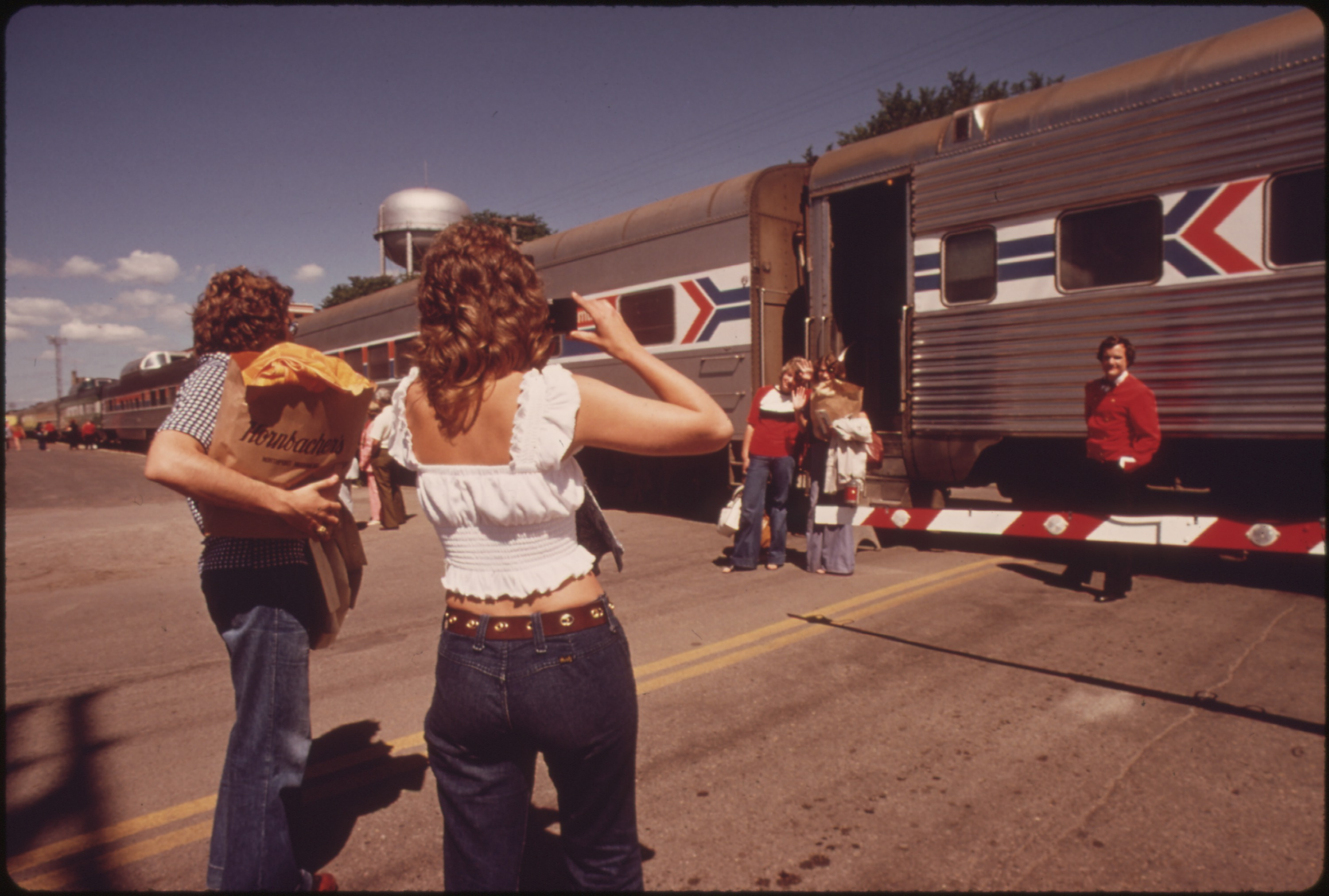
Passengers pose for a photo before boarding the Empire Builder in 1974. Amtrak trains traveling toward Chicago and Seattle stop daily between 1 and 4 am. Photo by Charles O'Rear.

Fargo is a major transportation hub for the surrounding region. It sits at the crossroads of two major interstate highways, two transcontinental railroads and is the home of an airport.

Fargo is served by Hector International Airport (named after Martin Hector), which has the longest public runway in the state. An Air National Guard unit and the Fixed-Base Operation Fargo Jet Center and Vic's Aircraft Sales are also at Hector.

The Fargo-Moorhead area is served by a bus service known as MATBUS. The bus service operates routes Monday-Saturday, many of which specifically cater to the area's college student population, who comprise half of its ridership. Greyhound Lines, Jefferson Lines and Rimrock Stages Trailways bus services additionally link Fargo to other communities.

The BNSF Railway runs through the metropolitan area as successor to the Great Northern Railway and Northern Pacific Railroad. Amtrak service is provided via the Empire Builder passenger train at the Fargo Amtrak station.

The city sits at the intersection of Interstate 29 and Interstate 94. U.S. Highway 81, U.S. Highway 10, and U.S. Highway 52 also run through the community.

The street system of Fargo is structured in the classic grid pattern. Routes that run from north to south are called streets, and routes that run from east to west are called avenues.

The major north–south roads (from west to east) include:

- 45th Street
- 42nd Street
- Interstate 29
- 25th Street
- University Drive (one-way southbound from 19th Avenue North until 13th Avenue South)
- 10th Street (Carries northbound University Drive traffic from 13th Avenue South until 19th Avenue North)

The major east–west roads (from north to south) include:

- 40th Avenue Northwest
- 19th Avenue North
- 12th Avenue North (Also known as North Dakota Highway 294; ND 294 is unsigned)
- Main Avenue
- 13th Avenue South and 13th Avenue Southwest
- Interstate 94
- 32nd Avenue South
- 52nd Avenue South
- 64th Avenue South

== In popular culture ==
Fargo is an Academy Award-winning 1996 black comedy film directed by the Coen brothers, which takes place primarily throughout Minnesota and a part of North Dakota. Fargo is only seen briefly at the film's opening scene set in a bar and mentioned only twice in the film. None of Fargo was shot on location in or near Fargo. A television series based on the film debuted in 2014, and occasionally featured the city in episodes.

The fictional town of Ludendorff, North Yankton in the 2013 video game Grand Theft Auto V is inspired by Fargo.

== Sister cities ==
Fargo has two sister cities:

- Moorhead, Minnesota
- West Fargo, North Dakota

== See also ==
- Fargo-Moorhead Toll Bridge
- Hector International Airport
- National Register of Historic Places listings in Cass County, North Dakota – with more than 20 Fargo properties
- Roman Catholic Diocese of Fargo
- USS Fargo, two ships
