= USS Fargo =

USS Fargo has been the name of two ships of United States Navy, the first of which was not completed as originally planned. Hence, there has been only one commissioned ship named for the city of Fargo, North Dakota.

- USS Fargo (CL-85) was originally laid down as a Cleveland-class light cruiser; it was completed as USS Langley (CVL-27), an Independence-class light aircraft carrier
- USS Fargo (CL-106) was the lead ship of her class of light cruisers
