= HealthyDakota =

American insurance company

HealthyDakota Mutual Holdings
- Mutual organization
- Trade name: HealthyDakota
- Industry: Health insurance
- Founded: 1966; 60 years ago
- Headquarters: Fargo, North Dakota, United States
- Website: www.healthydakota.com

HealthyDakota Mutual Holdings doing business as HealthyDakota, is an insurer headquartered in Fargo, North Dakota, United States. It offers health, dental, and life insurance, under several brands, including Blue Cross Blue Shield of North Dakota, which is the largest health insurance provider in the state of North Dakota, with a 96% market share in 2012. Its subsidiary Noridian Healthcare Solutions is a large electronic data interchange (EDI) contractor to Medicare.
