= The Right Hand (TV series) =

- Genre: Documentary; Reality TV
- Created by: Richard Arnold & Matt Austin Sadowski
- Directed by: Matt Austin Sadowski
- Starring: Brandon MacIntosh & Dan Leal
- Countries of origin: Canada; United States; Czech Republic
- Original language: English
- No. of seasons: 2
- No. of episodes: 22

Production
- Executive producer: Richard Arnold
- Producers: Richard Arnold & Lynnette Lanning
- Running time: 29 minutes
- Production company: Right Hand Productions

Original release
- Network: The Movie Network; Movie Central
- Release: October 7, 2011 – 2012

The Right Hand is a Canadian-American-Czech reality TV series that aired on The Movie Network and Movie Central. It follows Brandon MacIntosh, a Sheridan College film school graduate from Ayr, Ontario, hired as production assistant for Porno Dan, the owner of Immoral Productions, an upstart adult entertainment company, operating out of Southern California and Prague as well as attending awards shows (i.e. AVN Awards and XBIZ Awards) in Las Vegas. The second season follows Porno Dan working without Brandon, who quit in the second episode with Tyler Schaafsma and Chris Martino as Brandon's replacements.

== Appearances of notable adult entertainment performers ==
=== First season ===
- Brandy Aniston
- Aiden Ashley
- Sindee Jennings
- Shawna Lenee
- Molly Rae
- Victoria White

=== Second season ===
- Molly Bennett
- Martina "Tarra White" Mrakviova
- Rikki Sixx
- Britney Amber
- Nikki Hunter
- Ashli Orion
- Siri
