= Right Hand Man =

Right Hand Man may refer to:

- Right Hand Man (album), an album by Eddy Raven
  - "Right Hand Man" (Eddy Raven song), this album's title track
- "Right Hand Man" (Hamilton song), a song from the musical Hamilton
- "Right-Hand Man" (Suits), television episode
