= Holy Spirit Catholic Church =

Coordinates: 46.8960288°N 96.7920584°W

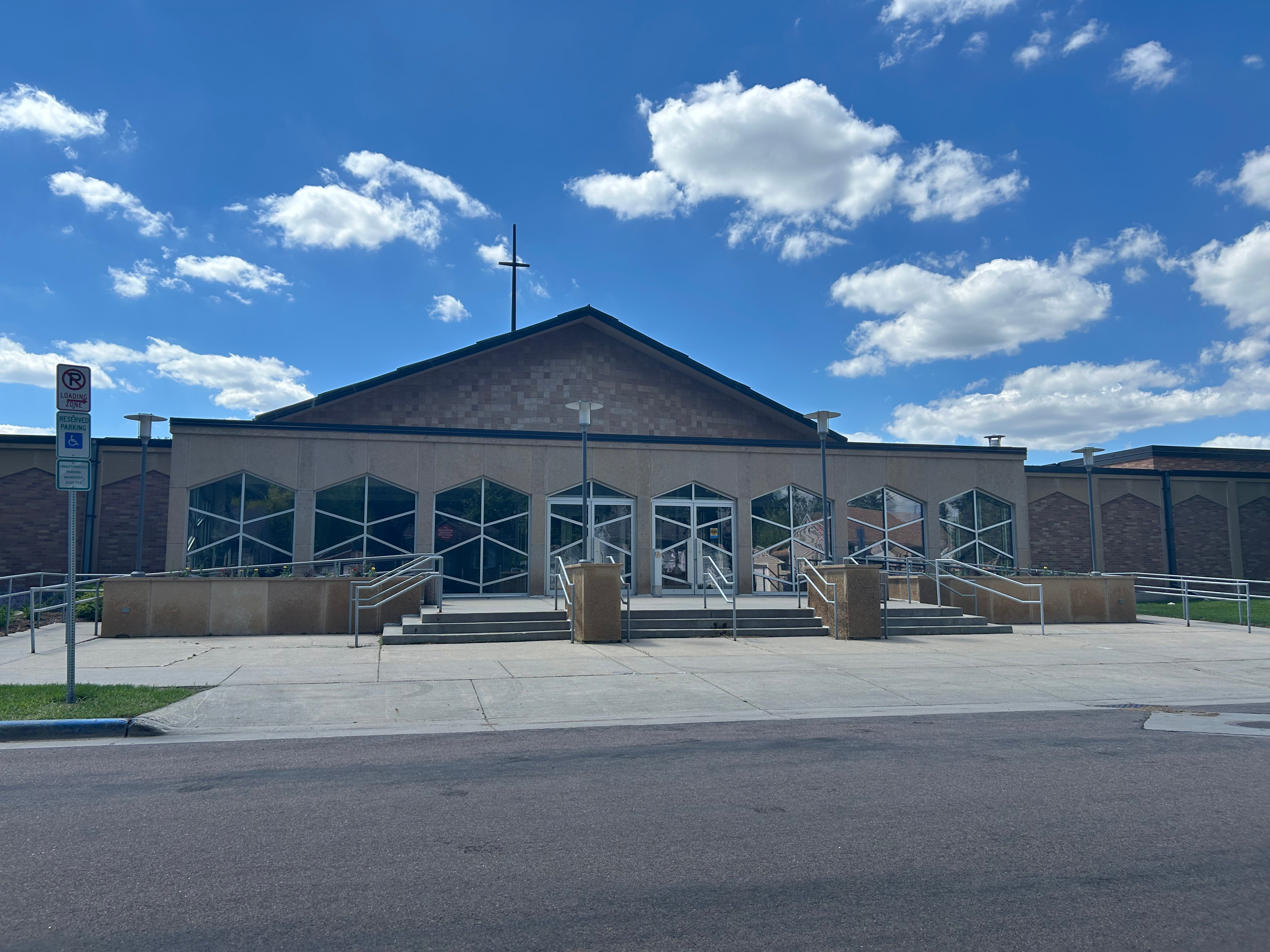
- Holy Spirit Catholic Church
- Location: 1420 7th Street N Fargo, North Dakota 58102
- Country: United States
- Denomination: Roman Catholic
- Website: holyspiritfargo.com

Clergy
- Pastor: Rev. Ross Laframboise

Holy Spirit Catholic Church is a Roman Catholic parish in Fargo, North Dakota. The pastor is Rev. Ross Laframboise, and Rev. Robert Keller is the parochial vicar.

== Schools ==
Holy Spirit Church has three parochial schools.

=== Holy Spirit Elementary School ===
Holy Spirit Elementary School serves students from prekindergarten to fifth grade, and has an enrollment of 150. Holy Spirit Elementary is connected to Holy Spirit Catholic Church.

=== Sacred Heart Middle School ===
Sacred Heart Middle School serves grades six to eight and has 230 students. It is located in a building that was completed in 2002, which it shares with Shanley High School.

=== Shanley High School ===
Shanley High School opened in its current form in 1950, and has an enrollment of 330 students.

== See also ==
- Roman Catholic Diocese of Fargo
