= Duluth City Public Links Golf Tournament =

Discontinued annual golf tournament

The Duluth City Public Links Golf Tournament (often shortened to Duluth Publinx) was conducted from 1927 to 1962 and determined annually the public course golf champion of Duluth, Minnesota. Being a municipal event, the tournament was held at either city-owned Enger Park Golf Course or Lester Park Golf Course. Like the U.S. Amateur Public Links Championship and the Minnesota State Public Links Championship, the Duluth Publinx was closed to golfers with playing privileges at a golf club not open to the general public.

== History ==
The first Duluth Publinx tournament was held over Labor Day weekend in September 1927 at Enger Park Golf Course and sponsored by the Duluth Municipal Amateur Athletic Association. Enger had opened just weeks earlier on July 2 and was at the time a nine-hole course. Against 21 other competitors, Oscar Erickson was the first winner of the tournament shooting rounds of 87 and 86 for a total score of 173 over 36 holes. Fourteen year-old Bobby Campbell finished in fifth place. By 1931, Campbell was one of the best golfers in the state winning two Minnesota state amateur titles among his many tournament wins during the 1930s before quitting the game at the start of World War II. Newspaper accounts do not reflect on the details behind the high scores shot during the tournament (Erickson was a Minnesota State Amateur Championship contender in 1930) but one can speculate that the course was probably still immature with construction having begun just a year before. Oscar Erickson would not defend his title in 1928 having joined the private Ridgeview County Club and becoming ineligible to compete.

Wally Johnson became the first to capture the Duluth Public Links title three times. With his third win, Johnson was awarded permanent possession of the original loving cup trophy. Months after his 1941 Duluth Publinx victory, Johnson joined the U.S. Air Corps after Pearl Harbor and was killed in action at the age of 27 in June 1943 in the Pacific Theater. The Duluth News-Tribune and the Duluth Herald sponsored a replacement trophy for the tournament which was retired in 1952 after Bob Braff had won the tournament for a third time. In 1958, Glenn Wicklund equaled the feat and retired that trophy by capturing his third Public Links title.

The Duluth City Public Links Golf Tournament was considered for many years one of the more prestigious tournaments for Duluth-area golfers. However, by the late fifties, the tournament had seen lagging interest. In response, a major change was introduced which allowed golfers with membership at a private club to compete for the Public Links title. The immediate result was an increase in participation with Dave Vosika of Ridgeview Country Club and Leo Spooner of Northland Country Club winning titles from 1960 to 1962. But, with the inclusion of private course golfers, the tournament distinctiveness was lost and the title of public course champion was hollow.

In 1963, North Lakes Golf Association (NLGA) officials decided to merge the Duluth City Public Links and the Duluth All-City Golf Tournament into one large event to be known as the All-City Championships. NLGA officials hoped that one big tournament open to all golfers regardless of club membership or skill would stimulate public interest and renew participant interest. The All-City Championships were never held; the NLGA never got it organized. The Duluth All-City Golf Tournament lingered on for another year. However, the Duluth City Public Links Golf Tournament was abandoned after a 36 year-run and, with its demise, ended the oldest and longest running consecutively-held golf tournament in the city of Duluth at the time.

== Winners ==
- 1927 Oscar Erickson
- 1928 Carl Olson
- 1929 Chet Belisle
- 1930 Carl Olson
- 1931 Everett Green
- 1932 Everett Green
- 1933 Ray Belisle
- 1934 Yngvar Nelson
- 1935 Palmer Lee
- 1936 Wally Johnson
- 1937 Palmer Lee
- 1938 Les Christofferson
- 1939 Lew Ink
- 1940 Wally Johnson
- 1941 Wally Johnson
- 1942 Carl Peterson
- 1943 Jim Koehler
- 1944 Ray Peterson
- 1945 Al Soberg
- 1946 Reider Lund
- 1947 Bob Braff
- 1948 Bob Braff
- 1949 John Olson
- 1950 Gary McKenzie
- 1951 Bill Cheslak
- 1952 Bob Braff
- 1953 John Patrick
- 1954 Glenn Wicklund
- 1955 John Patrick
- 1956 Glenn Wicklund
- 1957 Gary McKenzie
- 1958 Glenn Wicklund
- 1959 Rick Liljedahl
- 1960 Dave Vosika
- 1961 Leo Spooner
- 1962 Leo Spooner
