= Duluth All-City Golf Tournament =

The Duluth All-City Golf Tournament was conceived in 1941 as a demanding contest to determine annually the city golf champion of Duluth, Minnesota. To that end, tournament sponsors Duluth News-Tribune and Duluth Herald established a season-ending golf tournament of the best 32 golfers representing the city's two public (Enger Park Golf Course and Lester Park Golf Course) and three private (Northland Country Club, Ridgeview Country Club and Riverside Golf Club) golf courses.

Duluth All-City Golf Tournament Championship Trophy. Newspaper image from 1941. Current whereabouts of trophy is not known.

The field of 32 players was determined by 36-hole medal play intramural tournaments conducted at each golf course - some doubling as club championships. Ridgeview and Northland both qualified six players for the tournament, Enger Park and Lester Park seven each and Riverside four. Golfers unattached to any of the Duluth golf courses could compete for two at-large spots (Riverside closed in 1943 and its four entries were divided among Enger Park and Lester Park). Having qualified for the tournament, the participants played 18-hole match play elimination rounds with the two finalists playing a 36-hole match. Each year, the tournament rotated among the Duluth courses.

The first All-City champion was 28 year-old Jim Koehler of Enger Park who defeated fellow club member Wally Johnson 2 and 1 in a rain and wind-swept 36-hole match. Medal scores were excellent considering the conditions with Koehler shooting 73-78 (151) and Johnson 76-75 (151) over the par 72 Northland County Club layout. (Note: Wallace Johnson was killed in action at the age of 27 in June of 1943 in the Pacific Theater during World War II. A gifted golfer, from 1936 to 1941, he won the Duluth Public Links Championship three times, the Arrowhead Amateur (now Arrowhead Invitational) twice and the Northwest Public Links crown three times. Having joined the U.S. Air Corps after Pearl Harbor, the 1941 Duluth All-City was likely the last golf tournament in which he participated.) The championship golf trophy - a large silver loving cup to be displayed at the home club of the champion - was presented to Koehler. Koehler would repeat as winner in 1944 and 1953.

The Duluth All-City Golf Tournament quickly became one of the most prestigious golf events and a major among local and regional tournaments. Sponsorship by the two Duluth newspapers assured lavish print promotion and detailed coverage of the event. The mayor of Duluth added to the trappings of pomp and ceremony by officiated the drawing of pairings during the early years of the tournament.

Over the years, the structure of the tournament evolved. By 1943, the Northland and Ridgeview clubs determined their entries by selecting their lowest handicap players - a change adopted by Enger Park and Lester Park a few years later. A junior event was added in 1944. A substantial change occurred in 1955 when the tournament moved to 72-hole medal play. Under this format, a 36-hole cut eliminated all but eight players with a 54-hole cut further reducing the field to four players for the final 18 holes. A year later, the tournament was reduced to 36-holes all played on a single day to lessen the burden on the host course which had to close access to members or to the public to conduct the tournament.

Because of the competitive nature of the tournament, the All-City produced champions that also succeeded in competitions at both state and national levels. Among the junior champions, Bob Magie III and Gary Burton would subsequently win the Minnesota Golf Association's State Amateur Championship. At the senior level, John Jenswold was a two-time NCAA National Golf Tournament runner-up and 1944 Big Ten Conference champion. Tom Maas was the 1962 NAIA National Golf Tournament runner-up. Bob Fretland became a PGA touring professional and Jim Nordine lost 1-up to Jack Nicklaus in the quarterfinals of the 1959 Trans-Mississippi Amateur – one month before claiming his second Duluth All-City title. Duluthian Leo Spooner - one of the most successful amateur golfers from northern Minnesota and a member of the Minnesota Golf Hall of Fame - did not win the All-City; one of the very few area tournaments for which he did not have at least one victory.

The last Duluth All-City Golf Tournament was played in 1963. Prior to its demise, declining interest had caused some of the golf clubs to struggle filling their allocation of participants. Quotas were juggled among the clubs and at-large entrants became a larger percentage of the field. North Lakes Golf Association (NLGA) officials - who assumed promotion of the tournament from the Duluth News Tribune and Duluth Herald in 1954 - blamed the declining interest in the tournament on its timing. At its beginning in 1941, there were only a small number of golf tournaments available for area golfers. Over subsequent years, many other events such as the Reidar Lund Skyline Memorial Golf Tournament and Silver Bay Men's Invitational had been added to the summer tournament schedule so that by late September - when the All-City was conducted - players were no longer interested in tournament golf.

In early 1963, local golf officials decided to merge the Duluth City Public Links and the All-City golf tournaments into one large event to be known as the All-City Championship. At the time, the Public Links tournament was one of the oldest tournaments in Duluth having been conducted for 36 years. As with the All-City tournament, it had been one of the more popular events attracting most of the area's better golfers. However, it too had seen diminishing appeal in recent years. NLGA officials hoped that one big tournament would renew participant interest. The Public Links tournament was canceled as planned but the proposed All-City Championship didn't get off the ground because of other preoccupations by the NLGA. Consequently, the NLGA made a last-minute decision to play the All-City tournament for 1963 which was won by Rick Liljedahl. Jim Koehler, winner of the very first All-City tournament 22 years earlier, tied for second.

Having received a one-year reprieve, city golf pros and North Lakes Golf Association officials decided to end the All-City tournament in 1964 when it was concluded that they would have to increase the number of at-large entrants to more than six which no longer made it an "All-City" crown. Along with the discontinuance of the Duluth City Public Links Tournament the year before, two of the four local "Grand Slam" tournaments were no longer contested and a significant chapter in the history of competitive golf in Duluth was ended.

== Winners ==
Year	Champion	Runner-up	Junior Champion	Junior Runner-up	Location
1941	Jim Koehler	Wally Johnson	N/A	N/A	Northland Country Club
1942	Charles Malnati	Bernie McTeigue	N/A	N/A	Enger Park Golf Course
1943	Bob Fretland	Ray Peterson	N/A	N/A	Ridgeview Country Club
1944	Jim Koehler	Lew Ink	David Dinham	Leo Spooner	Lester Park Golf Course
1945	Dick Martin	Chet Belisle	Bill Rose	John Olsen	Northland Country Club
1946	Bernard Ridder Jr.	Jim Koehler	Bob Braff	Bill Rose	Enger Park Golf Course
1947	John Jenswold	Joe Cheslak	John Olsen	Bud Rose	Ridgeview Country Club
1948	Joe Cheslak	John Olsen	Frank Busker	Bob Daugherty	Lester Park Golf Course
1949	Bob Braff	Tom Hoak	Jack Flatt Jr.	Frank Busker	Northland Country Club
1950	Bob Braff	Joe Cheslak	Jack Flatt Jr.	John Killorian	Enger Park Golf Course
1951	Jim Nordine	Joe Cheslak	Don Braff	Bill Overman	Northland Country Club
1952	Bob Braff	Gary McKenzie	John Patrick	Dan McNicoll	Ridgeview Country Club
1953	Jim Koehler	Bob Braff	Dan McNicoll	Don Braff	Lester Park Golf Course
1954	John Olsen	Leo Spooner	Dan McNicoll	Dave Eckman	Enger Park Golf Course
1955	Joe Cheslak	Bob Korsch	Dan McNicoll	Jim Arneson	Northland Country Club
1956	Harvey Bloom	Glen Wicklund	Rich Cohen	Jerry Snyder	Lester Park Golf Course
1957	Leonard King*	Bob Van Hoven	Tony Ridder	Rollie Hoch Jr.	Ridgeview Country Club
1958	Joe Cheslak	Dave Vosika	Ron Johnson*	Tom Maas	Enger Park Golf Course
1959	Jim Nordine	Gary McKenzie	Bob Magie III	Pete Neimeyer	Northland Country Club
1960	Tom Maas	Dave Vosika*	Terry Peterson	Gary Andelin*	Lester Park Golf Course
1961	Dave Vosika	Gary McKenzie	Dave Hicks	Terry Peterson	Ridgeview Country Club
1962	Dave Vosika	Bill Patrick	Jim Sauntry	Gary Burton	Enger Park Golf Course
1963	Rick Liljedahl	Jim Koehler/Dick Kohlbry	Gary Burton	Craig Shogren	Northland Country Club

* Won in a playoff
