= Bill Israelson =

American professional golfer

Personal information
- Nationality: United States
- Born: February 21, 1957 (age 69) Brainerd, Minnesota, U.S.
- Spouse: Sarah
- Children: 3

Career
- Sport: Golf
- Turned professional: 1980
- Former tours: PGA Tour; Asia Golf Circuit
- Professional wins: 19

Number of wins by tour
- Asian Tour: 2
- Other: 17

Best results in major championships
- Masters Tournament: DNP
- PGA Championship: CUT: 1996
- U.S. Open: T52: 1985
- The Open Championship: DNP

Bill Israelson (born February 21, 1957) is an American professional golfer. Israelson had an exemplary amateur career, culminating with three consecutive victories at the Minnesota State Amateur in the late 1970s. He struggled in making it onto the PGA Tour, however, failing in four consecutive attempts at q-school. In the interim he played primarily on the Asia Golf Circuit, recording a win at the 1985 Thailand Open. Shortly thereafter, Israelson made it onto the PGA Tour but he did not have much success, playing for only two seasons on tour. For the remainder of his career, Israelson primarily worked as a club pro though still played in some well-publicized midwestern events, notably winning the Minnesota Senior PGA Professional Championship six times.

== Early life ==
Israelson was born in Brainerd, Minnesota. Israelson is from Bemidji, Minnesota. Israelson started caddying at Bemidji Town Country Club at the age of 10. Much later in life he said, “I worked my way up from a caddy, to the shoeshine guy and just about every other job." Larry Perkins, a high school teacher and notable golfer from Bemidji, served as his mentor during his early years. At the age of 13, he won the club championship at Lost River Golf Course in Gonvick, Minnesota.

Israelson was on the golf team and hockey team at Bemidji High School. He was considered a "standout" player on the hockey team. He eventually became one of the captains. In addition, Israelson received much media attention for his play on the golf team. During his sophomore year, in the spring of 1973, he received media attention for one of the first times. At the two-round high school state golf tournament, Israelson shot an opening round 72 to put him in a tie for fourth place among individuals, two back of the lead. At the end of the school year he played well at the state championship. During the summer he won the Birchmont and Bagley shortstops. His win at Birchmont was "his first noteworthy victory." In August, he played the two-round Minnesota Jaycee Junior Golf Tournament in Hastings, Minnesota. Israelson won the event at 142, defeating Brad Cook of Northfield, Minnesota.

In April 1974, the golf season began for Bemidji High School. Early in the season, Israelson was the medalist at several events. Due to his good performances, Israelson was honored as a "letter winner" at Bemidji High School. Shortly thereafter, the Bemidji team won the Region 8 title, defeating second-place holder Roseau once again. On June 6, the Lumberjacks started play at the Minnesota state championship. According to The Pioneer, Bemidji's town newspaper, Israelson was now considered the team's "leader." Later in the month, they easily defeated the Mahnomen golf team by 20 strokes at the opposition's home course. Israelson was medalist at the event. In the summer, after the school year had ended, he was slated to attempt to defend his Birchmont championship. He was considered one of the "top contenders." However, he lost to Gary McDonald in the first round. He did go on to win the Championship Consolation, though, defeating Colonel N.A. Lucas of Riverside, California. In early August, he played the State Junior Golf Tournament. The event was held at Gross National Golf Club. Israelson opened with a 75 (+4) to put him several shots back of the lead. However, he closed with an even-par 71 to finish in a tie for fourth. Overall, the Bemidji team finished seven shots back at 442. The following week he played the two-round Minnesota Jaycee Junior Golf Tournament. The event was held at Virginia Municipal Golf Course in Virginia, Minnesota. Israelson played against over 120 competitors in defense of his championship. On the final hole, Israelson made a 15-foot birdie putt to win the event by one over Tom Harper. In the late summer, he also won the Park Rapids big Heartland shortstop, Vandersluis Memorial, and Tianna shortstop.

During his senior year, Israelson continued to produce highlights. Israelson was medalist at several high school events early in the season. In late May, the Bemidji High School team won the District 25 title. With the win the Bemidji team qualified for the Region 8 meet. Israelson also qualified as an individual. In early June, the team played the two-round Minnesota high school golf tournament. The event was in Minneapolis at the University of Minnesota Golf Course. The team competition was determined in the first round. Israelson had the low score among individuals, with a 70, and Bemidji won the team title. The individual competition was completed the next day. With his 70, Israelson had a two stroke lead. However, he "skated" to a second round 78, finishing solo third, five back. In the summer he played the Minnesota State Amateur for the first time. He finished in fourth place.

== Amateur career ==
At the end of his senior year of high school The Star Tribune reported that Israelson would be attending Lamar University in Texas for college. He earned a golf scholarship. In the late winter of 1976, during the middle of his freshman year, Israelson received media attention for the first time as a university student-athlete. In February, he played the Pan American International Tournament in Monterrey, Mexico. At the "elite" event, he finished in fourth place. The following month, in March, he recorded a 5th place finish at the Border Olympics golf competition. Israelson received much praise for his performance over the course of the year. His coach, Dan Rogas, stated, "I may be going out on a limb in saying this, but Israelson is the best freshman golfer I've ever had at this state in this state of his career." He was referred to by The Port Arthur News as the number one player on the team.

In the summer, he returned to Minnesota. In July, he played the Minnesota State Amateur. He opened with rounds of 69 (−1) to take the lead. Though he started the final round poorly, bogeying three of the first five holes, but came back strongly, birdieing the 6th hole and playing even-par from there. He won by seven shots. "Heck, he just annihilated the field," said leading competitor Larry Johnson. Later in the summer, he won a significant match play event in Detroit Lakes, Minnesota, the Pine to Palm tournament.

Israelson soon returned to Lamar for his sophomore year. In April 1977, he played the three-round Louisiana Tech Invitational. He recorded a 212 total, four-under-par, to win the event. It was "his first collegiate tournament victory." Overall, Israelson remained the number one player on Lamar's team over the course of the year. He had the best scoring average on the team during this era.

After his sophomore year concluded, he returned to Minnesota. Over the course of the summer he went on a great winning streak. In early June, he played a 7up tournament at Edina Country Club. Israelson won his individual and team match. Roughly a month later he played the Pebble Lake shortstop. He shot an even-par 72 to win the event by three shots. Later in the month, he played in the amateur division of the three-round XX tournament. The event was held at Oxbow Country Club in Fargo, North Dakota. Israelson opened with a 67 which was "believed to be a course record." He finished at 212 (−4) to defeat Rob Dahm, who defeated him at the Birchmont the previous year, by three shots. Later in the month he played the three-round Minnesota Amateur. The first round was bookended by triple-bogeys "yet [he] still managed to shoot a 77." In the second round he shot a 72 to put himself three back, in a tie for third. In the final round, Israelson birdied three of the first four holes to get closer to the lead. He later stated, "I got off to that good start and knew I was going to score well." By the turn he was tied for the lead. On the 11th hole, Israelson made an 18-foot birdie putt to take the solo lead for the first time. His primary competitor Rick Benshoof bogeyed the next three holes "to drop back." Israelson subsequently birdied the 15th and 16th holes to assure the win. He won by eight strokes. "He's fantastic," Benshoof stated after the round about Israelson. "He's the best I've seen around here in a long time." It was Israelson's seventh straight victory. The following week he won the Mille Lacs Invitational. It was his "8th straight title." However, his win streak ended at the Birchmont International as he was "upset" by Miles Prestimon in the third round. Two weeks later, however, he won again, successfully defending his Pine to Palm championship.

Shortly thereafter, he returned to Lamar. In October, he played the Morton Braswell collegiate golf tournament. The event was held in Huntington Park Golf Course in Shreveport, Louisiana. Israelson shot rounds of 74 and 73 to lead Lamar's team and finish in a tie for fourth overall, only behind Hal Sutton, Bill Pierot, and Mark Powell. Later in the academic year, he competed in the Sunnehanna Amateur. Playing among a field of 55, he finished in a tie for 13th.

Israelson soon returned to Minnesota. In mid-July he played the three-round Minnesota State Amateur. In the first round he shot a 73 (+1). In the second round, played the same day in the afternoon, he shot 70 (−2), the round of the day. He was one back of leader Chris Perry. In the final round, his main competitor, Perry, played poorly, opening doors to the field. On the 14th hole, Israelson two-putted for birdie "to gain control of the tourney." With his even-par 72, he defeated Perry by three. He became the first person to win the event three times consecutively since Jimmy Johnston in the 1920s. Israelson also won 1978 Minnesota Golf Association Player of Year Award.

Shortly thereafter, he returned to Lamar. In October, he played the Morton Braswell Fall Classic at Shreveport Country Club. Israelson finished in a tie for fifth place only behind champion Hal Sutton, runner-up Fred Couples, third place finisher David Ogrin, and Peter Winkler. In the spring, he played the three-round Spring Intercollegiate Golf Tournament hosted by North Texas University in Denton, Texas. In the first round Israelson shot an even-par 71 to put him near the lead. In the second round, "despite brisk North winds," Israelson was able to shoot one-under-par to tie Southern Methodist's Payne Stewart for the lead. Playing against "steady rain" in the final round, however, Israelson was unable to match Stewart's 71, shooting a 75 to fall into a tie for second place.

Shortly thereafter, he returned to Minnesota. In July, he received much attention for his play at the Birchmont International. He made it to the finals where he played Mark Norman of Edina, Minnesota. Norman eagled the second and third holes to take a quick lead "which Israelson had to fight against the rest of the round." Israelson, however, managed to tie Norman late on the back nine. Norman then made his only bogey of the round on the 18th hole giving Israelson a 1 up win and the championship. Overall, Israelson shot a 66 (−6) in the round. The following year, Israelson nearly successfully defended his Birchmont championship, losing to Steve Herzog in the finals, 2 & 1. Israelson soon responded with a victory at the 1980 Pine to Palm tournament though.

== Professional career ==
Israelson turned professional in the late summer of 1980. In September, he played his first professional tournament, the North Dakota Open. In the three-round tournament he finished at 206 (−10), defeating Bob Ackerman by one. Israelson earned $5,000. Despite the victory, Israelson had no intention of trying to earn membership for the PGA Tour that fall. "I won't try for my professional card this year," he stated after the event. "I still have a lot of things to learn." Shortly after his win in North Dakota, he also won a "lucrative" pro-am in St. Cloud, Minnesota. Israelson then started playing the mini-tours in California and Texas. In May 1981, he attempted to qualify for the PGA Tour at Spring 1981 PGA Tour Qualifying School. However, he missed qualifying by a shot. The following month, in June, he attempted to qualify for the 1981 U.S. Open. At final qualifying, he was tied with a number of golfers for the final slots. Israelson competed in a six-for-five playoff to see who got the final five slots. Israelson three-putted the 2nd playoff hole to lose out. In the summer he played in some notable golf events in Minnesota, including the TapeMark Charity Pro-Am Golf Tournament and Minnesota State Open. In both cases he was the leader in the early rounds but faltered in the final round.

In the spring of 1982, Israelson attempted to qualify for the U.S. Open. Playing the Chicago sectional, Israelson was successful, finishing in second place, four back of medalist Jon Chaffee. The tournament proper was played at Pebble Beach Golf Links. Early at the 1982 U.S. Open, on Friday's back nine, Israelson birdied five holes against no bogeys to move into contention. It was the lowest back nine total in U.S. Open history at Pebble Beach. In addition, it was only one off of the back nine record at Pebble. Israelson, however, struggled on the weekend, failing to break 80, finishing in second to last place among those who made the cut. Because he made the cut, however, he qualified for the next two PGA Tour events, the Westchester Classic and the Western Open. He made the cut at the Westchester but missed the cut at the latter. In November, attempted to qualify for the PGA Tour at 1982 PGA Tour Qualifying School. After two rounds, Israelson was near the top 50 cutoff, in a tie for 52nd, but ultimately failed to make the tour.

Due to his failure to make it onto the PGA Tour, Israelson continued to play on the minitours. In addition, in early 1983 he started playing on the Asia Golf Circuit. In April, Israelson had much success at the Taiwan Open. Through the first three rounds he was at 226 (+10), five back of the lead. In the final round he shot a 69 (−3), the round of the tournament, to tie Lu Liang-Huan for the lead. Israelson, however, played poorly in the playoff, hitting his drive out of bounds at the third extra hole. Lu won easily. The runner-up finish, however, spurred him on to better play. He made the cut in all of his remaining events on the Asian circuit. He finished the season in 15th place on the Order of Merit. Shortly after the Asian season ended, Israelson returned to North America. In the late summer he recorded top 3 performances at two events, the Manitoba Open and St. Cloud pro-am.

In early 1984, Israelson returned to Asia. In March, he had much success at golf tournaments in Singapore. In mid-March, he played the Rolex Masters at Bukit Golf Course in Singapore. At the beginning of the third round, "playing with tremendous confidence," Israelson birdied four of the first five holes. With a 66 (−6), he nearly tied the course record and took the lead. In the final round he recorded "two quick birdies" and by the turn led by six strokes. Israelson made a number of birdies on the back nine, including one at the last, to win easily. He won with a 276 total. The following week he played the Singapore Open. He opened with rounds of 72 and 67 to put himself in a tie for ninth, two back of the lead. In the third round he shot a 69 to move into a tie for fifth with Rodger Davis, four back of leader Tom Sieckmann. In the final round he shot a 68 to finish in a tie for second with Burma's Kyi Hla Han and Australia's Terry Gale, two back of champion Sieckmann. After the round Israelson stated, "I'm satisfied, but will try to do better next time."

Shortly thereafter, Israelson returned to the United States. In the spring, he started playing on the Tournament Players Series (TPS), a satellite tour of the PGA Tour. In early May, he finished in a tie for fifth at the Tallahassee Open, a TPS event. In the summer, Israelson played some local Minnesota events, winning the Minnesota Golf Champions. In late 1984, he made his fourth attempt to qualify for the PGA Tour. At 1984 PGA Tour Qualifying School, Israelson was unsuccessful by a stroke.

In early 1985, Israelson returned to Asia. It was his third tour of the Asia Golf Circuit. In March, he played the Thailand Open. He opened with rounds of 68 (−4) and 67 (−5) to put him in a tie for second, three back of leader Ray Arinno. In the third round, Israelson started poorly, opening with two bogeys. However, he "brilliantly pulled his game back together" with birdies on five of the next seven holes. He ultimately shot a five-under-par 67 to take a four stroke lead over Arinno. He said after the round, "This is the first time I have been in contention in Asia and I hope to keep my head in front in the final round." Compatriot John Jacobs shot a course record 64 (−8) to seriously contend but Israelson "held off" his challenge to win by one. By the middle of the season, he was ranked in a tie for fourth on the Asian circuit's Order of Merit.

As of May, Israelson had returned to the United States. Shortly after he returned, he qualified for the U.S. Open. At the tournament proper, Israelson went on a run in the middle of the first round, recording three straight birdies to put him at −3, within one of the lead. However, he finished the round at +1. Israelson ultimately made the cut and finished in a tie for 52nd. Later in the summer, Israelson recorded top-3 performances at the National Car Open and Manitoba Open. Later in the fall, he entered PGA Tour Qualifying School again. It was his fifth attempt at qualifying school. He was successful this time, finishing in a tie for 14th place.

Israelson played on the PGA Tour during the 1986 season. Early in the year he had some success, making the cut in six of his first eight events between the West Coast swing and Florida swing. This included a T-11 at the Shearson Lehman Brothers Andy Williams Open, the annual stop in San Diego. His ninth event was the USF&G Classic in New Orleans. Israelson recorded a second round 65 (−7) to move into a tie for third, three back of leader Calvin Peete. He closed with rounds of 74 and 69 to finish T-7. He missed his next four cuts, however. In the middle of the season, however, he had some success. He recorded medalist honors at the Crown Colony Pro-am and the midwest sectional of the U.S. Open. Shortly thereafter, he was briefly in contention at the Westchester Classic, making "a name for himself" with an opening round 67 (-4), putting himself two out of the lead, in a tie for third. The following week he played the 1986 U.S. Open. Israelson opened poorly with a 79 (+9). However, he recorded three birdies on the Friday's back nine, including a 60-foot birdie putt, to make the cut on the number. "I played the last nine holes like a guy I used to remember," he said. Israelson, however, struggled for the remainder of the year, missing the cut in 11 of his final 17 events. He finished at #130 on the money list, five spots outside the threshold to maintain full-time status for the following year.

In 1987, Israelson played intermittently on the PGA Tour. He did not have much success, failing to make the cut in any of the 15 events he played. He lost his tour card at the end of the season. In 1988, Israelson returned to Asia. He recorded a tie for 15th at the Singapore Open. Other than that, however, he did not record many other highlights. By the middle of 1988, he was considered a "former tour pro."

On August 22, 1988, Israelson attended a golf event at Faribault Golf and Country Club. He later stated he had a minimum of 15 alcoholic drinks at the golf tournament. Israelson then went driving on Interstate 35 on Faribault, Minnesota. He got into a car accident and was charged with a DUI and manslaughter. "According to the criminal complaint," the Associated Press reported, "Israelson was drunk when the car he was driving went off Interstate 35 in a construction zone, flew through the air and sliced off the top of an oncoming car. The driver of the other car, Michelle Malakowsky, 20, of Hartland, died at the scene, the State Patrol reported." On March 6, 1989, Israelson pleaded guilty to second-degree manslaughter. On April 26, 1989, Israelson was "sentenced to one year in jail," the final 10 months of which would be "under a work-release program." Israelson would begin his jail sentence on May 1, 1989.

As of February 1990, Israelson began playing tournament golf again. He played some events on the Asia Golf Circuit. In 1991, he again played in Asia, recording a top five at the Indian Open. Shortly thereafter, he returned to Minnesota. In the summer of 1991, Israelson won a number of local golf tournaments. He recorded victories at the Tapemark Charity Pro-Am, Minnesota Matchplay Championship, and won his state open, the National Car Open, for the first time.

In early 1992, he returned to Asia. Early in the season he played the Singapore Open. Israelson opened with a 66 (−5) to put himself one back of the lead, in a tie for third. He followed with rounds of 67 (−4) and 68 (−3) to take a three shot lead. In the final round, Israelson "was under no pressure at all" from the field, shooting a 66 (−5) to defeat Frankie Miñoza by six shots. Later in the season, he recorded top six performances at the Indian Open and Maekyung Open. Overall, he won $97,000 on the Asia Golf Circuit for 1992.

=== Club professional ===
As of May 1992, Israelson had returned to Minnesota. Despite the recent success, Israelson quit working as a touring professional. He began working full-time as a club professional in Minnesota to start a family. He was now the assistant club professional at Northland Country Club in Duluth, Minnesota. During the summer he won a number of significant tournaments, including the Minnesota PGA Championship and the North Dakota Open, the latter the first time since he turned professional.

In 1993, he began working as the head club professional at Vintage Golf Course in Staples, Minnesota. He also started work at the assistant golf coach at Staples-Motley High School, the local public high school. Israelson continued to play in notable local events, however. That summer he won the Tapemark Charity Pro-am golf tournament, Minnesota PGA Championship. The following year he won the Minnesota PGA Matchplay. In 1994, he won Minnesota PGA Player of the Year for the third straight year. He also led Minnesota PGA Section money list.

Through the remainder of the decade, Israelson continued to work as the head professional at the Vintage. He continued to receive some media coverage at notable golf events, however. In 1995, he won the First American Bank Charity Golf Classic, a charity-pro am, held in St. Cloud, Minnesota. The following summer, Israelson qualified for a major championship on the PGA Tour, the 1996 PGA Championship. Later in 1996, he participated in the PGA Cup, a "Ryder Cup-like competition" held in Gleneagles, Scotland pitting 10 American club pros and against 10 European club pros. Israelson won the majority of his matches and the teams tied.

In the early 2000s, Israelson continued to work at Vintage. He continued to receive some media coverage at notable events, taking his round lead at his state open, the 2000 Best Buy Minnesota State Open, before settling for third. He also received some attention at the Troy Burne Cup, a match play event pitting top golfers from Wisconsin against the top golfers from Minnesota. Though his team lost, Israelson went undefeated in his matches.

In February 2007, Israelson turned 50. He began playing in some local senior tournaments. In September 2008, he shot rounds of 73–71 to win the Minnesota Senior PGA Professional Championship. He successfully defended his championship the following year.

During this era, Israelson was still the head pro at Vintage. He was inducted into the Minnesota Golf Hall of Fame in 2009. He continued to have success as a senior golfer. In 2010, he won the Minnesota Golf Champions. In 2011, he won the Minnesota Senior Open and the Minnesota Senior PGA Professional Championship. The following year he successfully defended his Senior PGA Championship. In 2013, he won a number of tournaments in Minnesota. He tied for the win at the Cragun's Legacy Pro-am, successfully defended his Minnesota Senior PGA Championship again, and won a team event, the Facility Team Championship, with fellow Vintage professional Brandon Myers.

Late in his career, Israelson had some success. In August 2019, he played the two-round Minnesota Senior PGA Championship. The event was held over the course of one day at Island View Golf Club in Waconia, Minnesota. Israelson recorded a 135 (−9) total to easily win, defeating Craig Brischke and George Smith by seven shots. It was his sixth win in the event.

As of 2021, Israelson had retired from work as a club professional.

== Personal life ==
Israelson married Sarah Daman on August 8, 1987. He met her after a golf tournament when he was 13 years old. She is a doctor. They have three children: Zach, Emily, and Andrew. All children played college golf. Andrew, in particular, had a "standout career" at North Dakota State University and turned professional in 2021.

Israelson lives in Staples, Minnesota.

== Awards and honors ==
- In 1978, Israelson was bestowed as the Minnesota Golf Association's Player of Year.
- From 1992 through 1994, Israelson earned the Minnesota PGA Player of the Year award.
- In 2009, Israelson was inducted into the Minnesota Golf Hall of Fame.

== Amateur wins ==
- 1973 Birchmont Amateur, Minnesota Jaycee Junior Golf Tournament
- 1974 Minnesota Jaycee Junior Golf Tournament
- 1975 Minnesota Golf Association Junior Tournament
- 1976 Minnesota State Amateur, Pine to Palms tournament
- 1977 Louisiana Tech Invitational, KX tournament (amateur division), Minnesota State Amateur, Mille Lacs Invitational, Pine to Palms tournament
- 1978 Minnesota State Amateur
- 1979 Birchmont Amateur
- 1980 Pine to Palms tournament

== Professional wins (19) ==
=== Asia Golf Circuit wins (2) ===
No.	Date	Tournament	Winning score	Margin of victory	Runner-up
1	Mar 17, 1985	Thailand Open	−15 (68-67-67-71=273)	1 stroke	(United States) John Jacobs
2	Mar 1, 1992	Epson Singapore Open	−17 (66-67-68-66=267)	6 strokes	(Philippines) Frankie Miñoza

Asia Golf Circuit playoff record (0–1)

No.	Year	Tournament	Opponent	Result
1	1983	Taiwan Open	(Taiwan) Lu Liang-Huan	Won three-hole aggregate playoff; Lu: E (4-3-5=12), Israelson: +3 (5-3-7=15)

=== Other regular wins (10) ===
- 1980 North Dakota Open
- 1984 Rolex Masters, Minnesota Golf Champions
- 1991 National Car Open
- 1992 North Dakota Open, Minnesota PGA Championship
- 1993 Minnesota PGA Championship
- 1994 Minnesota Matchplay PGA
- 2010 Minnesota Golf Champions
- 2013 Facility Team Championship (with Brandon Myers)

=== Senior wins (7) ===
- 2008 Minnesota Senior PGA Professional Championship
- 2009 Minnesota Senior PGA Professional Championship
- 2011 Minnesota Senior Open, Minnesota Senior PGA Professional Championship
- 2012 Minnesota Senior PGA Professional Championship
- 2013 Minnesota Senior PGA Professional Championship,
- 2019 Minnesota Senior PGA Professional Championship

== Results in major championships ==
Tournament	1982	1983	1984	1985	1986	1987	1988	1989	1990	1991	1992	1993	1994	1995	1996
U.S. Open	65			T52	T55										
PGA Championship															CUT

Did not play

"T" = Tied
CUT = missed the halfway cut

Note: Israelson never played in the Masters Tournament or The Open Championship

== Results in The Players Championship ==
Tournament	1986
The Players Championship	CUT

CUT = missed the halfway cut

== Results in senior major championships ==
Tournament	2007	2008	2009	2010	2011	2012	2013
Senior PGA Championship				CUT		CUT	
U.S. Senior Open	CUT						CUT

Did not play

CUT = missed the halfway cut

Note: Israelson never played in The Tradition, Senior Players Championship, or Senior British Open Championship

== See also ==
- 1985 PGA Tour Qualifying School graduates
