= Minnesota State Junior Boys' Golf Championship =

Golf tournament

The Minnesota State Junior Boys’ Golf Championship is an annual tournament conducted by the Minnesota Golf Association (MGA) to determine the state golf champion for boys less than 19 years of age. While the MGA traces the tournament back to 1924 (the 2014 event was billed as the 88th annual), the lineage to that first tournament is circuitous. Over the years, the state junior golf championship has encompassed four independently sponsored and differently named statewide tournaments with intervals during which two of the tournaments have overlapped.

The first iteration of the state junior championship was established by the MGA and conducted from 1924-1935. Known as the Minnesota Junior Golf Tournament, the first winner was Lester Bolstad. In 1931, the St. Paul Voiture of the American Legion Forty and Eight Veterans Organization sponsored a similar, if competing, statewide tournament called the Forty and Eight State Junior Golf Tournament. The two tournaments were played until 1935, after which the MGA discontinued its state championship.

The Forty and Eight State Junior Tournament distinguished itself from its MGA rival in that it saw greater participation – and success – among non-Minneapolis and St. Paul metro golfers. From 1934 to 1937, the tournament was won consecutively by out-state competitors. Except for the World War II years of 1943-1944, during which the tournament was not played, the Forty and Eight State Junior Tournament continued through 1945. However, in 1946, the Forty and Eight organization ended its sponsorship, resulting in no state junior golf tournament for that year.

After a one-year pause, the Minnesota Junior Chamber of Commerce assumed sponsorship of the tournament. The renamed Minnesota Jaycee Junior Golf Tournament was first played in 1947. The Minnesota Jaycee Junior was different from its predecessors in that players not only competed for the state title but also to qualify for the International Jaycee Junior Golf Tournament – one of the major junior golf tournaments at the time.

At the height of the Minnesota Jaycee Junior’s popularity and 25 years since ending the original Minnesota Junior Golf Tournament, the Minnesota Golf Association began the MGA Junior Golf Championship in 1961. The MGA Junior format included both individual and team competitions in which the best three of four scores of each round counted toward four-man team scoring. Four golfers – Ron Benson, Gary Rodin, Jon Chaffee, and Bill Israelson – won both the Minnesota Jaycee Junior and the MGA Junior.

In 1969, unable to find financial backing for the International Jaycee Junior Tournament, the U.S. Junior Chamber of Commerce ended the International. While state and local Jaycee Junior competitions continued in Minnesota, a significant draw for the state Jaycee Junior tournament was lost with the termination of the International. Consequently, by the mid-70s, the growth and expansion of the MGA Junior Golf Championship eclipsed that of the Minnesota Jaycee Junior Golf Tournament, and, after the 1975 event, the state Jaycee Junior was abandoned.

The MGA Junior Golf Championship – the surviving tournament of the four state golf championships – continues to this day. In 2002, the MGA renamed the tournament to the Minnesota State Junior Boys’ Championship and its winner represents the state of Minnesota as its junior golf champion.

== Winners ==
Minnesota Junior Golf Tournament (1924-1935)

| Year | Champion | Runner-up | Course | Location |
|---|---|---|---|---|
| 1924 | Lester Bolstad | Walter Moynihan | Minikahda Club | Minneapolis |
| 1925 | Don Burris | Jack Falconer | Superior Golf Club | Medina |
| 1926 | Al Snell | Earl Larson | Superior Golf Club | Medina |
| 1927 | Vernon Allen | Edgar Bolstad | Hilltop Golf Links | Columbia Heights |
| 1928 | Phil Halverson | Earl Larson | Edina Country Club | Edina |
| 1929 | Pat Sawyer | Earl Larson | Hillcrest Golf Club | St. Paul |
| 1930 | Pat Sawyer | Dale Morton | Minneapolis Golf Club | St. Louis Park |
| 1931 | Cy Anderson | Don Winge | Somerset Country Club | Mendota Heights |
| 1932 | Wally Taft | Loren Krugel | Golden Valley Golf and Country Club | Golden Valley |
| 1933 | Loren Krugel | Melvin Larson | University Golf Club | St. Paul |
| 1934 | Robert Graves | Jack Bain | Edina Country Club | Edina |
| 1935 | Merrill Peterson | Walter Hodge | Hillcrest Golf Club | St. Paul |

Forty and Eight State Junior Golf Tournament (1931-1945)

| Year | Champion | Runner-up | Course | Location |
|---|---|---|---|---|
| 1931 | Al Clasen | Ralph Clasen | Highland Park Golf Club | St. Paul |
| 1932 | Douglas Erickson | Lawrence Robertson | Highland Park Golf Club | St. Paul |
| 1933 | Lambert Fyhrie | Robert Knutson | Highland Park Golf Club | St. Paul |
| 1934 | Robert Knutson | John Tighe | Highland Park Golf Club | St. Paul |
| 1935 | William Cooper | Dean Larsen | Highland Park Golf Club | St. Paul |
| 1936 | Eugene Christensen | Robert Graves | Highland Park Golf Club | St. Paul |
| 1937 | Russell Valby | Eros Zotalis | Highland Park Golf Club | St. Paul |
| 1938 | Chet Latawiec | Jarvis Knutson | Theodore Wirth Golf Course | Minneapolis |
| 1939 | Wally Ulrich | Bob Clasen | Soldiers Field Golf Course | Rochester |
| 1940 | Ed Leary | Jarvis Knutson | Pine Beach Golf Course | Brainerd |
| 1941 | Bill Waryan | William Kaline | Highland Park Golf Club | St. Paul |
| 1942 | Bill Waryan | Jim Fortier | Theodore Wirth Golf Course | Minneapolis |
| 1943 | No tournament | | | |
| 1944 | No tournament | | | |
| 1945 | Charles Stenvig | Dean Daugherty | Theodore Wirth Golf Course | Minneapolis |
| 1946 | No tournament | | | |

Minnesota Jaycee Junior Golf Tournament (1947-1975)

| Year | Champion | Runner-up | Course | Location |
|---|---|---|---|---|
| 1947 | Richard Pogue, Jr. | Bob Braff | Greenhaven Country Club | Anoka |
| 1948 | Bob Braff | Richard Pogue, Jr. | Greenhaven Country Club | Anoka |
| 1949 | Mitchell Rosenholtz | Clayton Johnson | Greenhaven Country Club | Anoka |
| 1950 | Ted Vickerman | Bob Nordstrom | Greenhaven Country Club | Anoka |
| 1951 | Jack Flatt, Jr. | Pete Passolt | Greenhaven Country Club | Anoka |
| 1952 | Jim Lucius | Tom Hadley | Greenhaven Country Club | Anoka |
| 1953 | Tom Hadley | Bill McGovern | Greenhaven Country Club | Anoka |
| 1954 | Bill McGovern | Cy Northrop* | Greenhaven Country Club | Anoka |
| 1955 | Dick Kielty* | Tom Rose | Greenhaven Country Club | Anoka |
| 1956 | Gene Hanson | Rolf Deming | Greenhaven Country Club | Anoka |
| 1957 | Rolf Deming | Harry Newby, Jr. | Virginia Golf Club | Virginia |
| 1958 | Bob Balega | Tom Maas | Crow River Country Club | Hutchinson |
| 1959 | Jon Konz | Vern Novak, Jr. | Faribault Golf and Country Club | Faribault |
| 1960 | Tim Jolin* | Dave Gumlia | Virginia Golf Club | Virginia |
| 1961 | Ron Benson | Mike Zidel | Greenhaven Country Club | Anoka |
| 1962 | Mike Zidel | Dick Lindahl | Virginia Golf Club | Virginia |
| 1963 | Al Loomis | Ron Benson | Island View Country Club | Waconia |
| 1964 | Bob Barbarossa | Dwight Holmbo | Virginia Golf Club | Virginia |
| 1965 | Bob Barbarossa | Bob Hildebrandt | Interlaken Golf Club | Fairmont |
| 1966 | Dennis Johnson | James Terry | Mendakota Country Club | Mendota Heights |
| 1967 | Greg Gustafson | Jim Kruzich | Pebble Lake Golf Club | Fergus Falls |
| 1968 | Gary Rodin | Jon Carr* | Hastings Country Club | Hastings |
| 1969 | Jim Holisky | Gary Rodin* | Pebble Lake Golf Club | Fergus Falls |
| 1970 | Robert Deem | Robbie Harris | Greenhaven Country Club | Anoka |
| 1971 | Guy Coopet | Ed Demery | Hastings Country Club | Hastings |
| 1972 | Jon Chaffee* | Brian Sund | Dellwood Hills Country Club | Dellwood |
| 1973 | Bill Israelson | Brad Cook | Hastings Country Club | Hastings |
| 1974 | Bill Israelson | Jim Harper | Virginia Golf Club | Virginia |
| 1975 | Eric Niskanen | Bob Kertscher | Detroit Country Club | Detroit Lakes |

* Won in a playoff

MGA Junior Golf Championships (1961-2001)

| Year | Champion | Runner-up | Course | Location |
|---|---|---|---|---|
| 1961 | George Shortridge | Richard McMillan, Jr. | Somerset Country Club | Mendota Heights |
| 1962 | Ron Benson | Phil Reith | White Bear Yacht Club | Dellwood |
| 1963 | James Carlson* | Bob Barbarossa | Interlaken Golf Club | Fairmont |
| 1964 | Robert Hildebrandt* | Ward Johnson | North Oaks Country Club | North Oaks |
| 1965 | Gary Ostrin | Mick McGrath* | Meadowbrook Golf Club | Hopkins |
| 1966 | Dave Haberle* | Don Allen | Mendakota Country Club | Mendota Heights |
| 1967 | Dave Haberle | Bill Homeyer | Minnetonka Country Club | Excelsior |
| 1968 | Jay Jordan* | John Harris | University Golf Club | St. Paul |
| 1969 | Gary Rodin* | Larry Lenoch | Greenhaven Country Club | Anoka |
| 1970 | Mark Peterson | Dennis Barr | Hiawatha Golf Course | Minneapolis |
| 1971 | Gary Jacobson | Gary Hvass | St. Cloud Country Club | St. Cloud |
| 1972 | Gary Duren | Ed Demery | Forest Hills Golf Club | Forest Lake |
| 1973 | John Chaffee | Craig Stein | Les Bolstad Golf Course | Falcon Heights |
| 1974 | Brian Sund | John Chaffee | Gross Golf Course | Minneapolis |
| 1975 | Bill Israelson* | Gary Gabrielson | Minnetonka Country Club | Excelsior |
| 1976 | Mark Norman | Gary Gabrielson | Island View Golf Club | Waconia |
| 1977 | Stu Oftelie | Joe Kroc | Tartan Park Golf Course | Lake Elmo |
| 1978 | Jeff Teal | John Miller | White Bear Yacht Club | Dellwood |
| 1979 | Dave Tentis | Jeff Tollette | Hastings Country Club | Hastings |
| 1980 | Steve Schiffler | Pat Herzog | Crow River Country Club | Hutchinson |
| 1981 | Gordy Skaar, Jr. | Bill Banton | Interlaken Golf Club | Fairmont |
| 1982 | Steve Barber* | Mike Lehman | Burl Oaks Golf Club | Minnetrista |
| 1983 | Tom Nyberg* | John Reynolds | Island View Golf Club | Waconia |
| 1984 | Kirk Vanstrum* | Mike Scheller | Elk River Golf Club | Elk River |
| 1985 | Brad Geer | Jeff Stadheim | Purple Hawk Golf Club | Cambridge |
| 1986 | Tom Anderson* | Tim De Jarlais | Dahlgreen Country Club | Chaska |
| 1987 | Russ Simenson | Scott Goergen | Tartan Park Golf Course | Lake Elmo |
| 1988 | Brad Yzermans | Tim Herron | Forest Hills Golf Club | Forest Lake |
| 1989 | John Dailey | Russ Simenson | New Prague Golf Club | New Prague |
| 1990 | Dan Doeden | Paul Meyer | Timber Creek Golf Club | Watertown |
| 1991 | Aaron Barber | Sean Gorg | Le Sueur Country Club | Le Sueur |
| 1992 | Jason Rudquist | Conrad Ray/Mike Bolf | Crow River Country Club | Hutchinson |
| 1993 | Ryan Bard | Craig Trastek/David Christensen/Eric Ecker | Enger Park Golf Club | Duluth |
| 1994 | Mike Christensen | Matt Burgess | New Ulm Country Club | New Ulm |
| 1995 | Eric Ecker | Mike Christensen/Justin Royer/Andrew Johnson | Purple Hawk Country Club | Cambridge |
| 1996 | Justin Robel* | J.P. Prenevost | Pebble Lake Golf Club | Fergus Falls |
| 1997 | Kyle Blackman | John Marschall | Pokegama Golf Course | Grand Rapids |
| 1998 | Mike Marshall | Ryan Paulson | Dahlgreen Country Club | Chaska |
| 1999 | David Supalla | A.J. Hoffman/Pat Herzog | Shoreland Country Club | St. Peter |
| 2000 | Luke Benoit | Brian Bohlig | University Golf Club | St. Paul |
| 2001 | Rodney Hamblin | Ralph Baxley | Town and Country Club | St. Paul |

* Won in a playoff

Minnesota State Junior Boys' Golf Championship (2002-Present)

| Year | Champion | Runner-up | Course | Location |
|---|---|---|---|---|
| 2002 | Patrick Herzog | Grant Lissick/Josh Whalen/Scott Gustafson | Tanners Brook Country Club | Forest Lake |
| 2003 | Clayton Rask | Derek Bauer/Eric Harris/Ryan Smith | Dellwood Hills Country Club | Dellwood |
| 2004 | Jon Osgar* | Parker Pemberton | Legacy Courses at Cragun's | Brainerd |
| 2005 | Donald Constable | Brett Benson/Bryce Hanstad | Legacy Courses at Cragun's | Brainerd |
| 2006 | Matthew Schneider | Keith Goodman | Burl Oaks Golf Club | Minnetrista |
| 2007 | C.J. DeBerg | | The Preserve at Grandview Lodge | Pequot Lakes |
| 2008 | Robert Bell | Timothy Peterzen | The Preserve at Grandview Lodge | Pequot Lakes |
| 2009 | Tyler Rustad* | Tanner Lane | Wildflower at Fair Hills | Detroit Lakes |
| 2010 | Thomas Strandemo | Colton Buege/Chase Hahne | Wildflower at Fair Hills | Detroit Lakes |
| 2011 | Jon Dutoit* | Karter Smith | Rochester Golf and Country Club | Rochester |
| 2012 | Jack Pexa | Dominic Kieffer | Rochester Golf and Country Club | Rochester |
| 2013 | Jack Holmgren | Matt Rachey | Dacotah Ridge Golf Club | Morton |
| 2014 | Freddy Thomas | Max Redetzke | Dacotah Ridge Golf Club | Morton |
| 2015 | Carter Haley* | Ethan Kraus | Eagle Creek Golf Club | Willmar |
| 2016 | Andrew Israelson | Ben Sigel | Eagle Creek Golf Club | Willmar |
| 2017 | Jack Ebner | Carson Haley | The Bridges | Winona |
| 2018 | Caleb VanArragon | Jacob Pedersen | The Bridges | Winona |
| 2019 | Ian Simonich | Nate Adams* | Pioneer Creek Golf Club | Maple Plain |
| 2020 | Dayne Mann | Andrew Ramos | Detroit Country Club | Detroit Lakes |
| 2021 | Mason Roloff | Tyler Seeling/Davis Johnson/Braeden Sladek/Ryan Stendahl | Detroit Country Club | Detroit Lakes |
| 2022 | Peyton Coahran | Rylin Petry | Little Crow Country Club | Spicer |
| 2023 | Jack Holtz | Carson Boe/Justin Luan | Little Crow Country Club | Spicer |
| 2024 | Carter Callan | | Crow River Golf Club | |
| 2025 | Torger Ohe | | Alexandria Golf Club | |

* Won in a playoff
