= Minnesota State Amateur =

Amateur golf tournament

The Minnesota Amateur Golf Championship is an annual golf tournament in the American state of Minnesota.

== Winners ==
Year	Champion	Score	Runner(s)-up	Venue	Ref.
2025	Nate Stevens			The Classic at Madden's	
2024	Nate Deziel			Minnesota Valley CC	
2023	Caleb VanArragon	193	Bryce Hanstad	Minneapolis Golf Club	
2022	Ben Greve	218	Jack Ebner	Olympic Hills Golf Club	
2021	Derek Hitchner	201	Caleb VanArragon	Rush Creek Golf Club	
2020	Frankie Capan	204	Andrew Israelson	Edina Country Club	
2019	Clay Kucera	209	Van Holmgren, Andrew Israelson	Somerby Golf Club	
2018	Van Holmgren	211	Jesse Bull, Jacques Wilson	Hazeltine National Golf Club	
2017	Dave Carothers	214	Grady Meyer	Interlachen Country Club	
2016	Alex Uloth	206	Riley Johnson	North Oaks GC	
2015	Jon DuToit	214	Ben Welle	Northland CC	
2014	Jesse Bull	212	Erik Christopherson	Golden Valley G&CC	
2013	Sam Matthew	212	Ben Welle	Medina G&CC	
2012	Erik van Rooyen	213	David Christensen, Sammy Schmitz, Matt Schneider	Hastings CC	
2011	Donald Constable	206	Adam Riddering, Dillon Schultz	White Bear YC	
2010	Tom Hoge	205		Dacotah Ridge GC	
2009	Tom Hoge	213		Mendakota CC	
2008	Trent Peterson	211		Windsong Farm	
2007	Bryce Hanstad	217		Hazeltine National Golf Club	
2006	Andrew Paulson	208		Midland Hills CC	
2005	Joe Stansberry	215		Minikahda Club	
2004	Eric Deutsch	207		Northland CC	
2003	Kane Hanson	216		Minneapolis GC	
2002	Bowen Osborn	219		Olympic Hills GC	
2001	Ben Meyers	213		Winona CC	
2000	John Harris	211		Bearpath G&CC	
1999	Adam Dooley	204		North Oaks GC	
1998	James McLean	203		Rochester G&CC	
1997	David Christensen	137^{1}		Wayzata CC	
1996	Joe Stansberry	211		Interlachen Country Club	
1995	Mike Christensen	206		Alexandria GC	
1994	Aaron Barber	211		Midland Hills CC	
1993	Mike Sauer	209		Brackett's Crossing CC	
1992	Tim Herron	209		Golden Valley CC	
1991	James Scheller	213	John Harris, Tim Herron	Minnesota Valley CC	
1990	Dan Croonquist	219	Reed Kolquist	Minikahda Club	
1989	John Harris^{2}	207	Jon Christian	Rochester G&CC	
1988	Jon Christian	214	Jerry Dolan	Minneapolis GC	
1987	John Harris^{2}	224	Jeff Teal	Hazeltine National Golf Club	
1986	Dave Nordeen	218	Rick Copeland	Edina CC	
1985	Dave Nordeen	214	Rogers Donnelly	North Oaks GC	
1984	David Tentis	212	Pat Herzog, Ray Pontinen, Tom Waitrovich	White Bear YC	
1983	Chris Perry	208	John Harris	Detroit CC	
1982	Chris Perry	209	Tom Lehman, David Tentis	Town & Country Club	
1981	Tom Lehman	215	David Tentis	Wayzata CC	
1980	Mike Fermoyle^{2}	224	Steve Johnson	Olympic Hills GC	
1979	John McMorrow	205	Bruce Anderson	Hillcrest CC	
1978	Bill Israelson	215	Chris Perry	Northland CC	
1977	Bill Israelson	216	Bill Steinfeldt, Rick Benshoof^{3}	Interlachen Country Club	
1976	Bill Israelson	210	Norb Anderson^{4}	Oak Ridge CC	
1975	Steve Johnson	218	Jon Chaffee^{5}	Woodhill CC	
1974	John Harris	219	Jim Ihnot	Dellwood Hills GC	
1973	Mike Fermoyle	214	Gary Jacobson	St. Cloud CC	
1972	Rick Ehrmanntraut	215	Gary Jacobson	Golden Valley CC	
1971	Dave Haberle	215	Dick Blooston	Edina CC	
1970	Mike Fermoyle	292	Steve Johnson	Rochester G&CC	
1969	Gary Burton	292	Ron Benson	Minikahda Club	
1968	Gary Burton^{2}	287	Bill Brask, Warren Butler	Mendakota CC	
1967	Bob Magie III	290	Bill Brask	Golden Valley CC	
Format change from match play to stroke play
1966	Norb Anderson	3 & 1	Tom Cook Jr.	Midland Hills CC	
1965	Jim Archer	3 & 2	Jim Hiniker	Hazeltine National Golf Club	
1964	Bob Barbarossa	37 holes	Bob Finseth	Somerset CC	
1963	Rolf Deming	4 & 3	Bud Chapman	Stillwater CC	
1962	Gene Hansen	9 & 8	Neil Croonquist	Hillcrest CC	
1961	Gene Hansen	6 & 5	Neil Croonquist	Wayzata CC	
1960	Neil Croonquist	6 & 5	Joel Goldstrand	Town & Country Club	
1959	Ted Vickerman	2 & 1	Bill Waryan	Mankato GC	
1958	Bob Henrikson	3 & 2	Gene Hansen	Edina Country Club	
1957	Clayton Johnson	5 & 3	Tom Hadley	North Oaks Country Club	
1956	William Waryan	8 & 7	Tom Hadley	Rochester G&CC	
1955	Tom Hadley	1 up	Neil Croonquist	Minnesota Valley Country Club	
1954	Spero Daltas	2 & 1	Dick Copeland	White Bear YC	
1953	Henry Ernst	3 & 2	Don Holick	Minneapolis GC	
1952	William Zieske	3 & 2	William Waryan	Ridgeview Country Club	
1951	Ade Simonson	4 & 3	Kenny Young	Oak Ridge CC	
1950	Ade Simonson	10 & 8	Al Clasen	Golden Valley CC	
1949	Larry Karkhoff	39 holes	Oliver Williamson	Midland Hills Country Club	
1948	Charles Sawyer	5 & 4	Kenny Young	Interlachen Country Club	
1947	Lawrence Karkhoff	4 & 2	James Nordine	Bemidji Town & Country Club	
1946	Charles Sawyer	5 & 4	Neil Croonquist	Minikahda Club	
1945	Al Clasen	212^{6}	William Zieske	Edina Country Club	
1942-1944: No tournament from due to World War II
1941	Neil Croonquist	5 & 3	Gene Christensen	Town and Country Club	
1940	Tom Hamper	3 & 1	Virgil Roby	White Bear YC	
1939	George Wright	2 up	Dick Sawyer	Golden Valley CC	
1938	Kenneth Young	4 & 3	Harry Robinson Jr.	Midland Hills CC	
1937	Bobby Campbell	5 & 4	Neil Croonquist	The Country Club (now Edina CC)	
1936	Dick Sawyer	3 & 1	Oliver Williamson	Minneapolis GC	
1935	Al Clasen	2 & 1	Chauncey Griggs	Somerset Country Club	
1934	Bobby Campbell	4 & 3	Carson Herron	Northland CC	
1933	Carson Herron	10 & 8	Bobby Campbell	Interlachen CC	
1932	Pat Sawyer	2 & 1	Lee Herron	Midland Hills CC	
1931	Les Bolstad	4 & 3	Art Tevraa	Minikahda Club	
1930	Pat Sawyer	6 & 4	Art Tevraa	Rochester Golf and Country Club	
1929	Frank Brodl Jr.	8 & 6	Harry Robinson Jr.	Town and Country Club	
1928	Rudy Juran	3 & 1	Runice B. Martin	Bemidji Town and Country Club	
1927	Jimmy Johnston	7 & 6	Clive Jaffray	Somerset Country Club	
1926	Jimmy Johnston	3 & 1	John Wetherby	The Country Club (now Edina Country Club)	
1925	Jimmy Johnston	9 & 8	Lester Bolstad	Minnesota Golf Club	
1924	Jimmy Johnston	13 & 12	James K. Labatt	Interlachen Country Club	
1923	Jimmy Johnston	11 & 10	James Thompson	White Bear YC	
1922	Jimmy Johnston	7 & 6	John Wetherby	Golden Valley Country Club	
1921	Jimmy Johnston	5 & 4	Clive Jaffrey	White Bear YC	
1920	Harry Legg	6 & 5	Dudley Mudge Jr.	Northland CC	
1919	Harry Legg	7 & 6	Jimmy Johnston	Minikahda Club	
1918	Robert Hopwood	2 up	Fred Mahler	Interlachen Country Club	
1917	Harry Legg	4 & 3	Fred Mahler	White Bear YC	
1916	Dudley Mudge Jr.	2 & 1	Harry Legg	Town and Country Club	
1915	Dudley Mudge Jr.	9 & 8	Howard McMillan	Minikahda Club	
1914	Richard Patrick	5 & 4	Harry Legg	Northland CC	
1913	Harry Legg	9 & 8	Dudley Mudge Jr.	Interlachen Country Club	
1912	Harry Legg	4 & 3	Lynn Johnson	Town and Country Club	
1911	Harry Legg	2 & 1	Richard Patrick	Minikahda Club	
1910	Harry Legg	6 & 5	Nathaniel Rogers	Town and Country Club	
1909	Harry Legg	4 & 3	Gerald Livingston	Northland CC	
1908	Harry Legg	10 & 9	Lynn Johnson	Minikahda Club	
1907	Lynn Johnson	2 up	Harry Legg	Town and Country Club	
1906	Clive Jaffray	3 & 1	Harold Bend	Minikahda Club	
1905	Harry Legg	4 & 2	Lynn Johnson	Northland CC	
1904	Harold Bend	37 holes	C. T. Jaffray	Meadow Brook	
1903	Mike Doran Jr.	37 holes	Bill Finch	Town and Country Club	
1902	Harold Bend	19 holes	Ben Shumeier	Minikahda Club	
1901	Theodore Thurston	2 & 1	William Bolcom	Meadow Brook	

^{1} Rain shortened the event to 36 holes
^{2} Won playoff
^{3} Defeated Steinfeldt at sudden-death playoff to win runner-up
^{4} Defeated Bill Anderson at a playoff to win runner-up
^{5} Defeated Paul Strande at the first sudden-death playoff hole to win runner-up
^{6} Clasen won 18-hole playoff, 69–78
