= Wally Ulrich =

American golfer (1921–1995)

Personal information
- Nickname: Wallace William Ulrich
- Nationality: United States
- Born: March 12, 1921 Iowa, U.S.
- Died: April 7, 1995 (aged 74) Akron, Ohio, U.S.

Career
- Sport: Golf
- College: Carleton College
- Turned professional: 1948
- Former tour: PGA Tour
- Professional wins: 9

Number of wins by tour
- PGA Tour: 1
- Other: 8

Best results in major championships
- Masters Tournament: DNP
- PGA Championship: T9: 1953, 1955
- U.S. Open: CUT: 1946, 1950-51, 1953-55
- The Open Championship: DNP

Wallace William Ulrich (March 12, 1921 – April 7, 1995) was an American professional golfer who played on the PGA Tour in the 1940s and 1950s.

== Early life and amateur career ==
Ulrich was born in Iowa and raised in Austin, Minnesota. He attended Carleton College in Northfield, Minnesota where he was a member of the golf team. He won the 1943 NCAA championship; however, his college career was interrupted by service in the Marine Corps during World War II. Ulrich returned to Carleton after the war.

Ulrich won the Mexican Amateur in 1945. In 1946 and 1947, he won the Minnesota State Open as an amateur.

== Professional career ==
In 1948, Ulrich turned pro and joined the PGA Tour. His only tour win was the 1954 Kansas City Open. That same year, he became the fourth player in PGA Tour history to shoot a 60 when he had nines of 29-31 during the second round of the Virginia Beach Open. He went on to finish ninth at the event at Cavalier Yacht and Country Club.

Between 1948 and 1963, he made 183 PGA Tour cuts. Besides his victory, he was runner-up at the 1953 Canadian Open, losing by a stroke to Dave Douglas at Scarborough Golf and Country Club.

== Death ==
Ulrich died in Akron, Ohio where he had lived for 36 years.

== Amateur wins ==
- 1939 Minnesota State Junior Championship
- 1942 Albert Lea Shortstop
- 1943 NCAA Championship
- 1945 Mexican Amateur
- 1947 Midwest Conference Individual Champion

== Professional wins (12) ==
=== PGA Tour wins (1) ===
No.	Date	Tournament	Winning score	Margin of victory	Runners-up
1	Aug 1, 1954	Kansas City Open	−24 (69-66-67-66=268)	2 strokes	(United States) Gene Littler, (United States) Lloyd Mangrum

=== Other wins (11) ===
- 1946 Minnesota State Open (as an amateur)
- 1947 Minnesota State Open (as an amateur)
- 1948 RGCC Shelden Invitational
- 1949 RGCC Shelden Invitational
- 1950 RGCC Shelden Invitational
- 1950 Waterloo Open
- 1951 Minnesota State Open
- 1955 Minnesota State Open
- 1957 Iowa Open, Minnesota PGA Championship

== See also ==
- List of male golfers
