= James McLean (golfer) =

Australian professional golfer

Personal information
- Full name: James H. McLean
- Nationality: Australia
- Born: 16 September 1978 (age 48) Sydney, Australia
- Height: 6 ft 0 in (1.83 m)
- Weight: 170 lb (77 kg; 12 st)

Career
- Sport: Golf
- College: University of Minnesota
- Turned professional: 2000
- Former tours: PGA Tour; European Tour; Japan Golf Tour
- Professional wins: 1

James H. McLean (born 16 September 1978) is an Australian professional golfer that spent 2003 on the PGA Tour.

== Amateur career ==
As a freshman, McLean was the individual champion at the 1998 NCAA Division I Championship for the University of Minnesota and was an All-American in both 1998 and 1999. Also in 1998, McLean won the Minnesota State Open and Minnesota State Amateur.

== Professional career ==
McLean played seven events on the European Tour in 2001, where his best finish was T-10 at the Novotel Perrier Open de France.

McLean was a member of the Buy.com Tour in 2002 where he finished 84th on the money list. McLean then went to Q School where he earned his PGA Tour card.

McLean was a member of the PGA Tour in 2003 where he had 19 starts. That season he became ill and received a medical exemption that enabled him to enter various PGA Tour events from 2004 to 2006.

McLean played sparingly on the Japan Golf Tour in 2012 and 2013 with a best finish of T-10 at the 2012 Toshin Golf Tournament.

== Personal life ==
His father, Graeme McLean, was a footballer who played in five games for St Kilda Football Club of the Australian Football League (then known as the Victorian Football League).

== Amateur wins (3) ==
- 1997 Riversdale Cup
- 1998 Minnesota State Amateur, NCAA Division I Championship

== Professional wins (1) ==
- 1998 Minnesota State Open (as an amateur)

== See also ==
- 2002 PGA Tour Qualifying School graduates
