= Mike Morley =

American golfer and architect (born 1946)

Personal information
- Nationality: United States
- Born: June 17, 1946 (age 80) Morris, Minnesota, U.S.
- Height: 6 ft 2 in (1.88 m)
- Weight: 170 lb (77 kg; 12 st)

Career
- Sport: Golf
- College: Arizona State University
- Turned professional: 1969
- Former tour: PGA Tour
- Professional wins: 11

Number of wins by tour
- PGA Tour: 1

Best results in major championships
- Masters Tournament: 48th: 1977
- PGA Championship: T15: 1976
- U.S. Open: T8: 1980
- The Open Championship: DNP

Mike Morley (born June 17, 1946) is an American golf course architect and a former professional golfer who played on the PGA Tour for 14 years.

== Early life and amateur career ==
In 1946, Morley was born in Morris, Minnesota. He was raised there and in Minot, North Dakota where his family later moved during his youth.

Morely graduated from high school in La Jolla, California in 1964 and then attended Arizona State University in Tempe and was a two-time first-team All-American on the Sun Devil golf team in 1967 and 1968.

== Professional career ==
Morley won a handful of tournaments as a professional, including the satellite 1972 Magnolia State Classic, and the 1977 Ed McMahon-Jaycees Quad Cities Open; both events were opposite major championships. He had a great deal of success at the Bing Crosby Pro-Am finishing in the top-10 four times including a solo 2nd in 1976. His best finish in a major was a tie for eighth at the U.S. Open in 1980 at Baltusrol.

After losing his PGA Tour card in 1984, Morley played on an Asian Tour for two or three years. When he retired as a tour professional, Morley first tried selling real estate in Arizona, but found that golf course architecture and design was the business that he wanted to pursue. Early in this phase of his career, he worked for Tom Watson's firm. Today he is a partner in a golf course architecture and design business with fellow former PGA Tour golfer Dan Halldorson. Most of the courses Morley has designed are in Minnesota.

== Personal life ==
Morley lives in Minot, North Dakota.

== Awards and honors ==
- In 1967 and 1968, Morley earned first-team All-American honors at Arizona State University.
- In 1977, Morley was inducted into the North Dakota Golf Hall of Fame.
- Morley is a member of the Arizona State University Hall of Fame.
- In 2002, Morley was voted "Mr. Golf" by the Minnesota Golf Association.

== Amateur wins ==
- mid-1960s Two North Dakota State Amateur Opens

== Professional wins (11) ==
=== PGA Tour wins (1) ===
| No. | Date | Tournament | Winning score | To par | Margin of victory | Runners-up |
|---|---|---|---|---|---|---|
| 1 | July 10, 1977 | Ed McMahon-Jaycees Quad Cities Open | 68-69-64-66=267 | −17 | 2 strokes | (United States) Bob Murphy, (Mexico) Victor Regalado |

=== Other regular wins (9) ===
- 1972 Magnolia State Classic
- 1973 Shreveport Open, North Dakota Open
- 1975 Minnesota State Open
- 1978 North Dakota Open
- 1982 Minnesota State Open
- 1983 Minnesota State Open, Arizona Open
- 1986 Arizona Open

=== Senior wins (1) ===
- 2003 Minnesota Senior Open

== Results in major championships ==
| Tournament | 1967 | 1978 | 1969 | 1970 | 1971 | 1972 | 1973 | 1974 | 1975 | 1976 | 1977 | 1978 | 1979 | 1980 | 1981 |
|---|---|---|---|---|---|---|---|---|---|---|---|---|---|---|---|
| Masters Tournament | CUT | | | | | | | | | | 48 | CUT | | | CUT |
| U.S. Open | | | | | | | | | | T14 | T27 | 60 | | T8 | CUT |
| PGA Championship | | | | | | | | | 47 | T15 | T44 | T42 | | T46 | T61 |

Note: Morley never played in The Open Championship.

Top 10
Did not play

CUT = missed the half-way cut
"T" indicates a tie for a place

== See also ==
- Fall 1969 PGA Tour Qualifying School graduates
