= John Harris (golfer) =

American professional golfer (1952–2025)

Personal information
- Full name: John Richard Harris
- Nationality: United States
- Born: June 12, 1952 Minneapolis, Minnesota, U.S.
- Died: September 17, 2025 (aged 73)
- Height: 6 ft 0 in (1.83 m)
- Weight: 190 lb (86 kg; 14 st)

Career
- Sport: Golf
- College: University of Minnesota
- Turned professional: 1976 (reinstated amateur 1983); 2002
- Former tours: PGA Tour; Champions Tour
- Professional wins: 3

Number of wins by tour
- PGA Tour Champions: 1
- Other: 2

Best results in major championships
- Masters Tournament: T50: 1994
- PGA Championship: DNP
- U.S. Open: CUT: 1977, 1994, 2001
- The Open Championship: CUT: 1994

John Richard Harris (June 13, 1952 – September 17, 2025) was an American professional golfer who played on the PGA Tour and the Champions Tour.

== Early life and amateur career ==
Harris was born on June 13, 1952, in Minneapolis, Minnesota, and grew up in Roseau, Minnesota. He attended the University of Minnesota where he distinguished himself in both golf and hockey. Harris was the second-leading scorer on his 1974 hockey team that went on to win the national championship. In addition, his brother Robbie was a talented hockey player and played for the U.S. ice hockey team at the 1976 Winter Olympics.

In the spring of 1974, Harris won the individual Big Ten championship in golf. In the summer, he also won the 1974 Minnesota State Amateur.

== Professional career ==
Harris played minor league hockey after college and then became a professional golfer in 1975. He earned playing privileges for the PGA Tour at Fall 1975 PGA Tour Qualifying School graduates. Harris did not have much success on the PGA Tour, however, his best finish being T-26 at the 1976 Hawaiian Open.

== Re-instated amateur career ==
Harris regained his amateur status in 1983 and soon became one of the dominant players on the amateur circuit in Minnesota. He won the Minnesota State Amateur three additional times during this era. He also won the Minnesota State Mid-Amateur five times and the 1993 U.S. Amateur at the age of 41. During this era, he also won the Minnesota State Open back-to-back in 1994 and 1995 while still an amateur.

== Second professional career ==
After turning 50 in June 2002, Harris began his second professional golf career. His first win during this era, came in his fifth Champions Tour season at the 2006 Commerce Bank Championship.

Harris took over as director of golf at the University of Minnesota in July 2010 after the departure of Brad James. In December 2010, the Minnesota Daily published a report that Harris kept associate women's head coach Katie Brenny from coaching, traveling with the team, or recruiting while letting his son-in-law and former caddy, Ernie Rose, perform those duties under a different title. Harris resigned as director of golf in June 2011. In March 2014, Hennepin County Judge Thomas M. Sipkins awarded Katie Brenny $359,000 in a discrimination lawsuit related to her treatment by Harris and Rose while at the University of Minnesota.

== Personal life and death ==
Harris lived in Eden Prairie, Minnesota. On April 1, 1990, the City of Edina named the roadway connecting Braemar Boulevard to the Braemar Golf Course clubhouse to John Harris Drive.

He died of acute myeloid leukemia on September 17, 2025, at the age of 73.

== Amateur wins ==
- 1974 Big Ten Championship (individual), Minnesota State Amateur
- 1987 Minnesota State Amateur
- 1988 Minnesota State Mid-Amateur
- 1989 Minnesota State Amateur
- 1990 Minnesota State Mid-Amateur
- 1991 Minnesota State Mid-Amateur
- 1992 Minnesota State Mid-Amateur
- 1993 U.S. Amateur
- 1995 Sunnehanna Amateur
- 1997 Porter Cup
- 1999 Minnesota State Mid-Amateur
- 2000 Minnesota State Amateur
- 2002 Terra Cotta Invitational

== Professional wins (3) ==
=== Regular wins (2) ===
- 1994 Minnesota State Open (as an amateur)
- 1995 Minnesota State Open (as an amateur)

=== Champions Tour wins (1) ===
No.	Date	Tournament	Winning score	Margin of victory	Runner-up
1	Jun 25, 2006	Commerce Bank Championship	−11 (70-68-64=202)	Playoff	(United States) Tom Jenkins

Champions Tour playoff record (1–0)

No.	Year	Tournament	Opponent	Result
1	2006	Commerce Bank Championship	(United States) Tom Jenkins	Won with birdie on first extra hole

== U.S. national team appearances ==
Amateur

- Walker Cup: 1993 (winners), 1995, 1997 (winners), 2001
- Eisenhower Trophy: 1994 (winners)

== See also ==
- Fall 1975 PGA Tour Qualifying School graduates
