= Ridgeview Country Club =

Golf club in Duluth, Minnesota

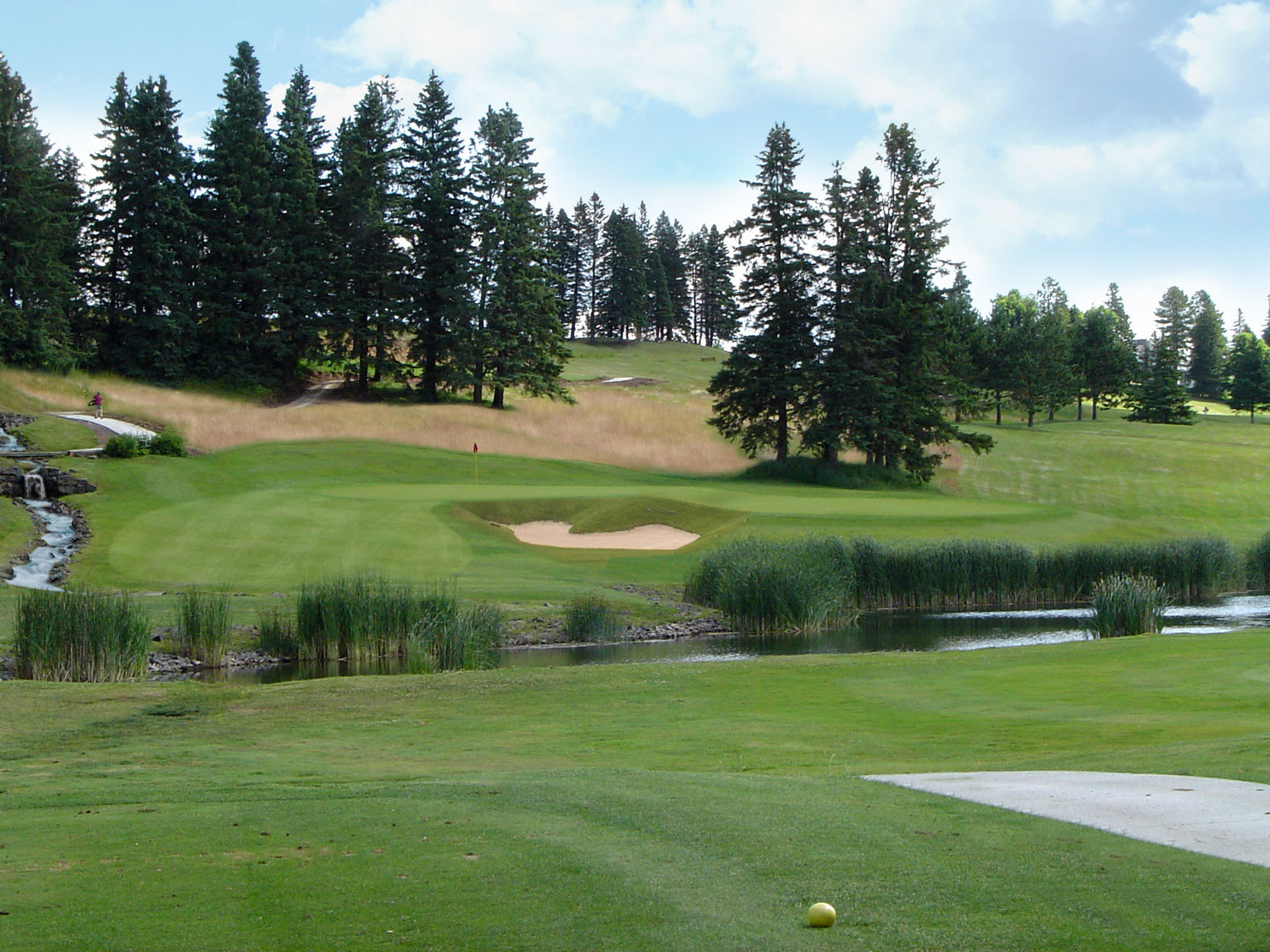
- The 17th hole at Ridgeview Country Club in 2024.

- Location within the United States Location within Minnesota
- 46°50′56.0934″N 92°6′6.732″W

Club information
- Location: Duluth, Minnesota, U.S.
- Established: 1920; 106 years ago
- Type: Private
- Tota holes: 18
- Tournaments: Minnesota State Open (1939); Minnesota State Amateur (1952); Arrowhead Open (1927–1944); Arrowhead Men's Championship (1928–present); Arrowhead Women's Championship (1948–present)
- Website: ridgeviewcountryclub.com

Course information
- Designed by: William Watson (1920), Paul Van Hoven (1951 renovation)
- Par: 70
- Length: 6,264 yards (5,728 m)
- Course rating: 70.9
- Slope rating: 132

Ridgeview Country Club is a golf club located in Duluth, Minnesota, United States. It is a private club and closed to guests not accompanied by a member. The golf course was designed by William Watson and opened in 1921.

== History ==
The Ridgeview Country Club was incorporated on July 22, 1920. The club was organized as the demand for golf exceeded the limited memberships offered by Northland Country Club and Riverside Golf Club, the only golf courses in Duluth, Minnesota at that time. (Note: Riverside Golf Club was a nine-hole private course located in the Riverside neighborhood of Duluth, Minnesota. It operated from 1919 to 1943; its footprint today encompasses the RiverWest Development at the foot of Spirit Mountain Recreation Area.) To this end, the club purchased 160 acres of land on the northern boundary of Duluth for $42,500 from Thomas A. Merritt of the iron-ore pioneering Merritt family for use as a golf course. The prolific golf course architect William Watson was hired to design an 18-hole layout. Watson designed courses include Olympic Club (Lake Course), TPC Harding Park, Interlachen Country Club, and the Minikahda Club. Charter membership of 225 was fully subscribed by October 1920. Almost one year to the day after Watson's arrival, a nine-hole course was formally opened on September 4, 1921, with a putting and driving contest as well as a medal play tournament. Eventually, 11 holes of Watson's original design would be built. (Note: Holes 4-7, 10, 14-18 of Ridgeview's current layout are of William Watson's design. The driving range, formerly hole 11 for over 60 years was also included in Watson's layout.) Joe Dahlman was appointed as Ridgeview's first golf professional and a clubhouse was constructed off of West Winona Street behind what is now the 10th and 15th greens.

The original nine-hole layout was par 37 and included holes that are found on both the front and back nines of the current course. (Note: From newspaper accounts along with the known location of the first clubhouse, the first hole of the original nine was likely Ridgeview's current 16th hole with the finishing hole the 15th. The original 4th hole, a par five, probably followed the current eighth and ninth hole but backwards.) The first recorded course record of 74 for 18-holes was set in June 1925 by Runcie Martin, a Duluth resident and one of the finest amateur golfers in the nation. A few weeks later, World Golf Hall of Fame inductee Walter Hagen shot a 69 in an exhibition match against Martin. In 1923, Andy Dewar, scored the first hole-in-one made at Ridgeview at the 124-yard par three sixth hole (current fifth hole).

Four years after its first play, Ridgeview's second nine-holes were completed in September 1926. The 18-hole course played to a par 69 and was considered a difficult test in its day. The course nines were reversed from their present numbering with the first hole starting from the West Winona Street clubhouse following what is now the driving range. Current hole number ten ended the outward nine. In 1928, work began on a new (and still in use) clubhouse. Opened in 1929, the considerably larger clubhouse offered expansive views of the golf course from its prominent location at the highest point of the course property. With the relocation of the clubhouse, the holes were renumbered to its present arrangement.

Ridgeview Country Club hosted the 1939 Minnesota State Open won by Lester Bolstad. In 1952, Bill Zieske captured the Minnesota State Amateur Championship at Ridgeview. From 1927 to 1944, the club conducted the Arrowhead Open which featured top club professionals from the Midwest. The 1931 Arrowhead Open event was won by Johnny Revolta who would later win 18 PGA tournaments including the 1935 PGA Championship. Beginning in 1928, Ridgeview has hosted the Arrowhead Men's Championship, one of the premier golf tournaments in the state. The Arrowhead Women's Championship has been conducted since 1948.

== Layout ==
The Ridgeview golf course is a par 70 (34–36) layout featuring numerous elevation changes, sloping fairways and not so subtly contoured greens. A few ponds populate the course as well as a meandering creek that captures its share of wayward balls. The perimeter holes are surrounded by woods and out-of-bounds. In recent years, storms and landscape management have removed many of the trees that once lined the interior fairways of the course. (Note: When Ridgeview first opened, the interior of the course was nearly treeless. William Watson did not like trees to be in play declaring that the best courses in Scotland did not have a single tree or bush anywhere on them.) Ridgeview is not a long test with the men's blue tees currently set at just 6,264 yards. However, sand traps protect most greens which tend to be on the smaller size as is characteristic of older era courses. While the course these days is set-up to be more playable for the typical golfer, there are still traces as to why Ridgeview was considered one of the more difficult courses in the upper-Midwest. For example, the par three 3rd hole previously required a 220-yard tee shot, all of it uphill carry to a sloping green perched on a rise that falls off on the front and left sides. Although this set-up is rarely used these days, it is a reminder of why the best golfers in the Midwest managed just two rounds under par at the 1939 Minnesota State Open.

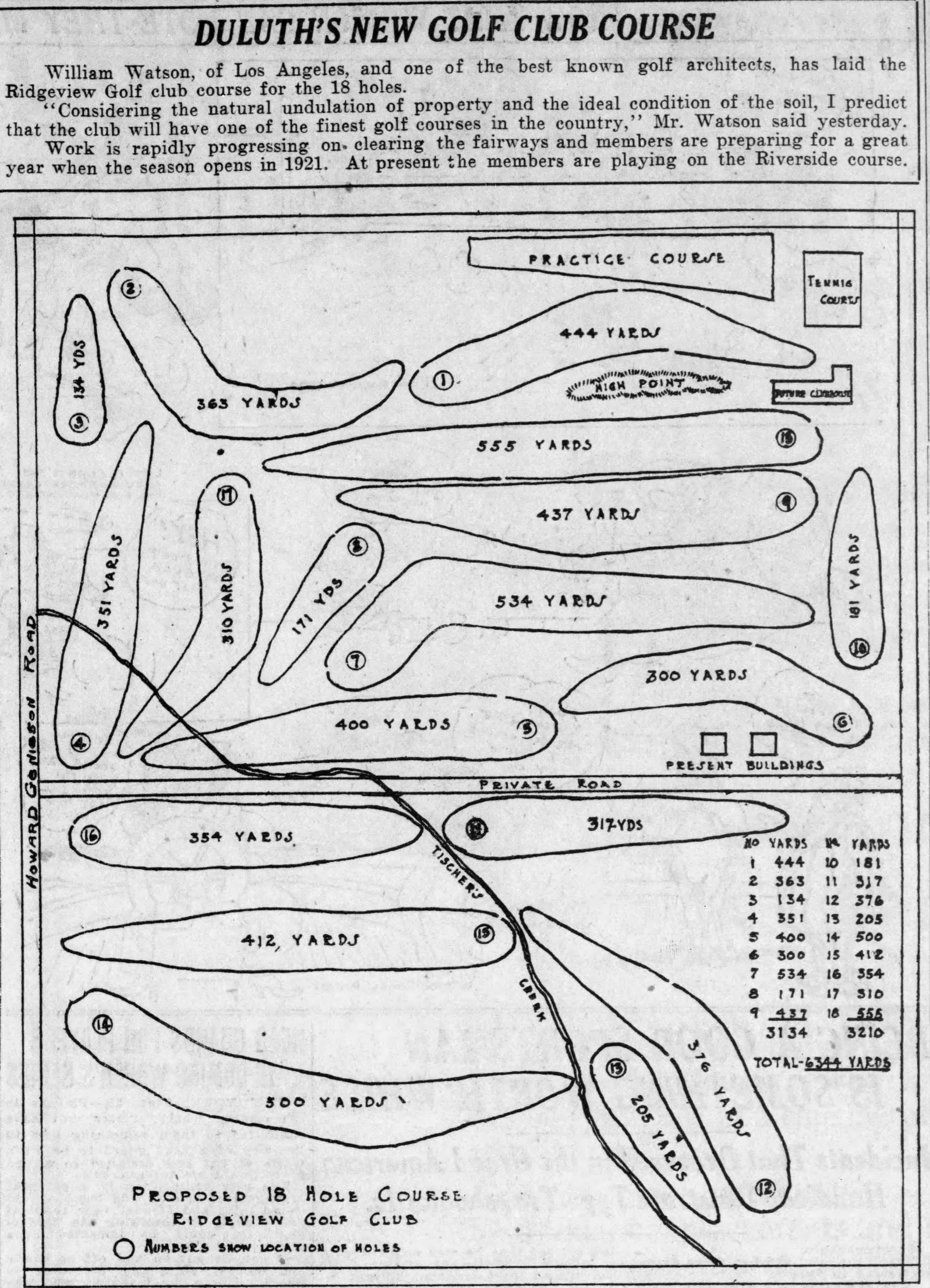
Newspaper illustration of William Watson's Ridgeview Country Club design circa 1920.

Ridgeview has been significantly altered over the years with only ten holes generally following William Watson's original layout. The course became a par 70 (34–36) in 1935 when the second hole, originally a par four, was lengthened some 200 yards into a drained peat bog and made into a par five. To make room for the second hole redesign, the 140 yard third hole was changed entirely. The tee, originally located in what was now the second hole extension, was moved to be parallel with the second hole and lengthened to 220 yards at the tips.

Several major changes were made to the course in the early 1950s. The first green was relocated adding approximately 45 yards to the hole. (Note: The original first hole was a short par four of 275 yards and, in 1930, Ray Johnson scored the only known hole-in-one.) An observant eye can see the contours of the original green in the first fairway looking back from the second tee. The 12th green was also relocated from its original location in a flat area that now fronts the current 13th fairway. It was moved about 50 yards east to its present spot to create space for a redesigned 13th hole. The 13th hole was formerly a 90-degree left dogleg. Shooting north out of a tee surrounded by woods on three sides, the player's drive crossed Tischer creek into a hilly area (now covered by trees) adjacent to the 12th tee. The hole then turned west, the right rough bordering a utility road, and re-crossed the creek towards a green located in an area currently occupied by the 14th tee.

The years 1980-1990 also saw substantial changes to Ridgeview. A driving range now occupies what was once the 11th fairway. A new 11th hole was carved out of the adjoining woods creating a right dogleg to the original green. The ninth hole originally was a straight hole terminating at green located where a chipping range is today. The green was moved to its current location near the clubhouse creating a right dogleg hole. A controversial move at the time, the difficult par three 17th hole was made shorter and the green less elevated to the tee when a new putting surface was cut into the hillside below the former green. The second hole green was once again moved further west and away from bordering out-of-bounds. Traces of the old green can still be seen in the rough area just west of the pond. Finally, the 13th green was moved south about 40 yards to its present location to create more dogleg to the hole.
