= North Dakota Open =

State open golf tournament

The North Dakota Open is the North Dakota state open golf tournament, open to both amateur and professional golfers. It was first held in 1964 and since 1986, has been an event on the Dakotas Tour.

== History ==
The inaugural event was in 1964. The event was one-round long and had a purse of $2,000. Eddie Langert of St. Paul, Minnesota shot a par-72 to win the tournament by three strokes over Corky Dahl, Herb Marcussen, and Paul O'Leary. The following year the tournament increased to two rounds long. In addition, prize money increased to $3,500 and the winner's cheque was now $600. George Shortridge shot an opening round 73 (+1) to take a one-stroke lead. He led by one over Langert and Byron Comstock. A further shot behind were a number of players including Corky Dahl and Fargo's "host pro" Jack Webb. Langert and Webb outplayed all competitors during the final round and were "deadlocked" down the stretch. However, Webb holed a 40-yard approach shot for a birdie at the par-4 18th hole to assure the win. His 70 (−2) was the only under-par round of the tournament. At 145 (+1), Webb defeated Langert by two strokes.

In 1968, the total prize money increased to $10,000. In 1969, at least 42 professionals entered the event, the most ever. As of 1970, the event remained at Fargo Country Club. Before the 1970 tournament it was announced that, "Most of the leading pros in the Dakotas, Minnesota and Canada have indicated they will enter," including Mike Morley, PGA Tour professional. In 1972, Bill Schwenneker, former assistant professional at Fargo Country Club, won the event. In 1973, the winner's prize increased to $1,600. Morley, the PGA Tour pro, won the event. In 1974, Dave Comstock broke Fargo Country Club's course record during the tournament. He shot an opening round 65 breaking Mike Morley's course record. In the early summer of 1975 there were extensive floods in the Fargo region. The tournament, which was scheduled to be played in September, was cancelled by July 18. In mid-1970s, the tournament started to alternate between Fargo Country Club and Oxbow Country Club with the final round at Fargo CC. By the late 1970s, the tournament alternated between Fargo CC and Moorhead Country Club.

In 1980, there was a significant increase in prize money making it the "richest" North Dakota Open ever. The overall purse expanded from $32,000 to $40,000 and the winner's cheque increased from $4,000 to $5,000. In 1981, the winner's prize money had increased to $6,000. In 1984, the tournament started to be sponsored by the Melroe Division Clark Equipment Company. In 1985, Skip Holten broke the tournament record with a 203 total.

== Winners ==
Year	Champion	Score	Ref.
Bobcat North Dakota Open
2026	Josh McCollum	190	
2025	Angus Flanagan	194	
2024	Brady Calkins	203	
2023	Andre Metzger	205	
2022	Michael Mattiace	197	
2021	Andre Metzger	203	
2020	Andre Metzger	200	
2019	Tim Ailes	203	
2018	Kevin Stanek	131	
2017	Tom Hoge	196	
2016	Hudson Carpenter	206	
2015	Matt Miller	203	
2014	Ricky Hearden III	200	
2013	Andre Metzger	207	
2012	Ryan Lenahan	205	
2011	Tim Ailes	198	
2010	Tim Ailes	202	
2009	Patrick Stolpe	204	
2008	Brady Schnell	202	
2007	Kane Hanson	204	
2006	David Schultz	202	
2005	Chad Fribley	203	
2004	Dean North	198	
2003	Mike Podolak (a)	206	
2002	Paul Wackerly	200	
2001	Douglas Ferris	209	
2000	Dustin Wigington	204	
1999	Jeff Schmid	135	
1998	Aaron Barber	205	
1997	Jeff Schmid	206	
1996	Steve Shriver	206	
1995	Greg Ladehoff	205	
1994	Chuck Moran	208	
Melroe-North Dakota Open
1993	Doug Dunakey	207	
1992	Bill Israelson	207	
1991	Jim Ahern	202	
1990	Bart Bryant	200	
1989	Jeff Coston	206	
1988	Joel Edwards	211	
1987	John Snyder	203	
1986	James Blair	209	
1985	Skip Holton	203	
1984	Tony Grimes	205	
North Dakota Open
1983	Barney Thompson	209	
1982	Jim Ahern	213	
1981	Billy Pierot	207	
1980	Bill Israelson	206	
1979	Doug Higgins	207	
1978	Mike Morley^{1}	209	
1977	Dennis Sullivan^{2}	213	
1976	Jim Shade	207	
1975	Tournament cancelled due to flood		
1974	Ron Benson	210	
1973	Mike Morley	217	
1972	Bill Schwenneker	213	
1971	John Cook	215	
1970	Jim Doyle (a)	146	
1969	John Cook	138	
1968	George Shortridge	143	
1967	Dave Gumlia	144	
1966	Dave Gumlia	142	
1965	Jack Webb	145	
1964	Ed Langert	72	

(a) denotes amateur
^{1} Morley's birdie on first sudden-death playoff hole defeated Dan Halldorson
^{2} Sullivan won on the first hole of a sudden-death playoff
