= Minnesota PGA Championship =

The Minnesota PGA Championship is a golf tournament that is the championship of the Minnesota section of the PGA of America. Although the Minnesota section was formed in August 1917, there were no section championships held until 1931.

== Winners ==
Year	Champion	Ref.
2026	Jacob Otta	
2025	Jesse Nelson	
2024	Alex Gaugert	
2023	Jeff Sorenson	
2022	Jon Reigstad	
2021	Jeff Sorenson	
2020	Dale Jones	
2019	Don Berry	
2018	Craig Brischke	
2017	Brent Snyder	
2016	Mitchell Mackedanz	
2015	Don Berry	
2014	Tim Brovold	
2013	Brent Snyder	
2012	Don Berry	
2011	Don Berry	
2010	Jeff Sorenson	
2009	Jeff Kringen	
2008	Jeff Sorenson	
2007	Don Berry	
2006	Jeff Sorenson	
2005	Todd Kolb	
2004	Scott Spence	
2003	Don Berry	
2002	David Tentis	
2001	Don Berry	
2000	Don Berry	
1999	Don Berry	
1998	David Nordeen	
1997	Don Berry	
1996	Jon Chaffee	
1995	Kevin Carter	
1994	Jon Chaffee	
1993	Bill Israelson	
1992	Bill Israelson	
1991	Jon Chaffee	
1990	Jon Chaffee	
1989	Jon Chaffee	
1988	Mike Barge	
1987	Bill Brask	
1986	Joel Goldstrand	
1985	Bill Brask	
1984	George Shortridge	
1983	Bill Brask	
1982	George Shortridge	
1981	George Shortridge	
1980	Brad Schmierer	
1979	George Shortridge	
1978	George Shortridge	
1977	Jim Ahern	
1976	John Cook	
1975	Jack Baldwin	
1974	Frank Freer	
1973	Dick Nelson	
1972	Bob Reith Jr.	
1971	John Cook	
1970	Corky Dahl	
1969	Bob Reith Jr.	
1968	George Shortridge	
1967	Bob Reith Jr.	
1966	Harold Sexton	
1965	Corky Dahl	
1964	Bob Reith Jr.	
1963	Ray Hill	
1962	John Cook	
1961	John Cook	
1960	Don Waryan	
1959	Don Waryan	
1958	Don Waryan	
1957	Wally Ulrich	
1956	Ray Hill	
1955	Bill Kidd, Jr.	
1954	Joe Sodd	
1953	Bruce Hamilton	
1952	Stan Larson	
1951	Lester Bolstad	
1950	Leonard Mattson	
1949	Leonard Mattson	
1948	Leonard Mattson	
1947	Leonard Mattson	
1946	Gunnard Johnson	
1945	Gunnard Johnson	
1944	Joe Coria	
1943	Joe Coria	
1942	Gunnard Johnson	
1941	Gunnard Johnson	
1940	Gunnard Johnson	
1939	Gunnard Johnson	
1938	Lester Bolstad	
1937	Gunnard Johnson	
1936	Gunnard Johnson	
1935	Willie Kidd	
1934	Gunnard Johnson	
1933	Elmer Carlson	
1932	Jock Hendry	
1931	Gunnard Johnson	
