= Fall 1977 PGA Tour Qualifying School graduates =

This is a list of the Fall 1977 PGA Tour Qualifying School graduates.

The event was held at Pinehurst Resort in North Carolina. There were 144 players in the event. The top 30 players would earn playing privileges for the PGA Tour.

There were a number of changes from previous qualifying schools. In June 1977, Commissioner Deane Beman announced the addition of sectional and regional components to qualifying school. He thought this would help weed out mediocre players and make finals more logistically simple. The length of finals was also reduced from 108 holes to 72 holes. According to the Associated Press, recent two-time NCAA champion Scott Simpson and 1976 U.S. Amateur champion Bill Sander were considered the favorites. In addition, former All-Americans from Oklahoma State University–Stillwater, Tom Jones and Jaime Gonzalez, were also "expected to succeed."

== Tournament summary ==
In the first round Rick Beck of Geneva, Alabama shot a 68 (−4) to take a one-stroke lead over a number of players. After the first two rounds Ed Fiori and Len Mickles held the joint lead at 139. Fiori's round of 66 was the tournament's best so far. It concluded five consecutive birdies. In the third round, playing amidst "cold weather and chilling winds," Fiori and Mickles expanded their lead with rounds of 73 (+1). At 212 (−4), they held a two shot lead over Gary Jacobson. Skeeter Heath was in fourth place at this point, three back, tied with Jeff Hewes and Parker Moore. In the final round, Fiori shot a "steady" even-par 72 while Mickles "faltered" on the final hole ensuring that Fiori was medalist. Fiori finished at 284 (−4), the only player under par, and defeated Mickles by four.

Sander failed to qualify. He was at the cut-off point after 16 holes of the final round. However, he shot five-over-par over the final two holes to miss qualifying by five strokes. Simpson also failed to qualify. He was especially hurt by a septuple-bogey 12 on the par-5 12th hole during the first round. Among the players from Oklahoma State, Jones failed to earn playing privileges but Gonzalez was successful.

== List of graduates ==
#	Player	Notes
1	(United States) Ed Fiori	
2	(United States) Len Mickles	
3	(United States) Buddy Gardner	Winner of 1974 and 1975 Alabama Amateur
	(United States) Skeeter Heath	
5	(United States) Gary Jacobson	
6	(United States) Mike Shea	
	(United States) Bruce Robertson	
	(United States) Rick Beck	
9	(United States) Dana Quigley	Winner of 1973 Rhode Island Open
	(United States) Parker Moore	
11	(United States) Jeff Hewes	
12	(United States) Perry Arthur	
	(United States) Dave Nevatt	
	(United States) Mitch Adcock	
	(United States) Gary Vanier	
16	(Canada) Jim Nelford	Winner of 1975 and 1976 Canadian Amateur Championship
	(United States) Don Brigham	
	(United States) Lonnie Nielsen	
	(United States) Mike Booker	
	(Brazil) Jaime Gonzalez	Four-time winner of Brazil Amateur Open Championship
21	(United States) Bob Howerter	
	(United States) Pat McGowan	
	(United States) Bob Clark	
	(United States) Ron Ashby	
	(United States) Bobby Stroble	
26	(United States) Mac Hunter	
	(United States) Jim White	
	(United States) Dave Shipley	
	(United States) Jim Ulozas	
	(United States) Gary Ostrega	
	(United States) Bobby Baker	
	(United States) Skip Guss	
	(Canada) Dave Barr	4 Canadian Tour wins
	(United States) Travis Hudson	
