= Minnesota State Open =

Golf tournament

The Minnesota State Open is the Minnesota state open golf tournament, open to both amateur and professional golfers. It is organized by the Minnesota section of the PGA of America. It was first played in 1917 and has been played at a variety of courses around the state.

== History ==
The first event was held on September 6, 1917. Twenty-four players played in the event. Professional golfer Tom Stevens, who played out of the Minikahda Club in Minneapolis, won the tournament by one stroke.

In 1930, there was one of the more surprising victories. Edward Baening, a golf club salesman, "came out of nowhere" to win the event. During the mid-20th century, Joe Coria and Ade Simonson produced many highlights. In 1934, while still an amateur, Coria won for the first time. In 1940 he won for the second time, his first as a professional. In 1941, Coria and Simonson were the top contenders. Near the end of the tournament, Coria was the clubhouse leader though Simonson, still playing, was near the lead. On the 18th hole Simonson "plopped a shot 60 yards away out of a divot to within a foot of the cup" to assure a playoff with Coria. However, Coria defeated Simonson in the playoff. Coria won the tournament in 1952, his last victory. In 1959, Simonson had a chance to win. He had a four-shot lead going into the final round. However, Simonson made an 8 on the 10th hole of the final round which facilitated his loss to Bill Waryan. It was his seventh and final runner-up finish. Simonson never won the event. During this era, the tournament was held at a variety of courses around the state including Duluth, Mankato, Faribault, and Rochester.

In 1980, the event started to be permanently held at Bunker Hills Golf Club in Coon Rapids, Minnesota. During this year the tournament also started to be sponsored by National Car. It was sponsored by National Car until 1997. During these years, it was known as the National Car Open or, colloquially, as "the Car." From 1998 to 2001, the tournament was sponsored by Best Buy.

In 1998, the tournament was preceded by a series of events under the title "Minnesota Golf Week." The events included "a celebrity golf tournament, golf clinics, a junior, senior, and women's championship, entertainment and various fundraisers" followed by the tournament proper.

Around the turn of the century, Australians with golf scholarships at the University of Minnesota have won the tournament. They include James McLean in 1998, Ben Meyers in 2001, and Yu Katayama in 2008.

Since 2009, the event has alternated between Bunker Hills and a different course in the state.

== Winners ==
Year	Champion	Ref.
Minnesota State Open
2026	Muzzy Donohue	
2025	Tyler Leach	
2024	Carson Herron (a)	
2023	Caleb VanArragon (a)	
2022	Van Holmgren	
2021	Cecil Belisle (a)	
2020	Angus Flanagan (a)	
2019	Brady Madsen (a)	
2018	Andrew McCain	
2017	Benjamin Greve (a)	
2016	Benjamin Greve (a)	
2015	Andrew McCain (a)	
2014	Trent Peterson (a)	
2013	Jon DuToit (a)	
2012	Ryan Peterson	
2011	Troy Johnson (a)	
2010	Clayton Rask	
2009	Brett Swedberg	
2008	Yu Katayama (a)	
2007	Kane Hanson	
2006	Mike Barge	
2005	Jered Gusso	
2004	Ty Armstrong	
2003	Joe Stansberry	
Best Buy Minnesota State Open
2002	David Tentis	
2001	Rodney Cook	
2000	Ben Meyers (a)	
1999	Don Berry	
1998	James McLean	
National Car Open
1997	John Snyder	
1996	Andy Brink^{1}	
1995	John Harris	
1994	John Harris	
1993	George Shortridge	
EDS/National Car Open
1992	Don Berry	
National Car Open
1991	Bill Israelson	
1990	Tom Lehman	
1989	Tom Lehman	
1988	Jon Chaffee^{1}	
1987	Kevin Cashman	
1986	Jim Sorenson	
1985	Joel Goldstrand^{1}	
1984	Chris Perry^{1}	
1983	Mike Morley	
1982	Mike Morley	
1981	George Shortridge	
1980	Dan Croonquist	
Minnesota State Open
1979	Dan Croonquist	
1978	Dave Haberle	
1977	Ron Benson	
1976	Rick Ehrmanntraut	
1975	Mike Morley	
1974	Ron Benson	
1973	Joel Goldstrand	
1972	Ron Benson	
1971	Clayton Johnson	
1970	Dave Haberle	
1969	Bob Reith Jr.	
1968	Eddie Langert	
1967	Clayton Johnson	
1966	George Shortridge	
1965	Dave Gumlia	
1964	Dave Gumlia	
1963	Joe Sodd	
1962	Gene Hansen	
1961	Gene Hansen	
1960	John Cook	
1959	Bill Waryan	
1958	Paul O'Leary	
1957	Ray Hill	
1956	Charles "Pat" Sawyer	
1955	Wally Ulrich	
1954	Ray Hill	
1953	Loren Krugel	
1952	Joe Coria	
1951	Wally Ulrich	
1950	Bill Waryan	
1949	Joe Coria	
1948	Joe Coria	
1947	Wally Ulrich (a)	
1946	Wally Ulrich (a)	
1945	Joe Coria	
1944	Stan Larson	
1943	Les Bolstad	
1942	Harry Cooper	
1941	Joe Coria^{1}	
1940	Joe Coria	
1939	Les Bolstad	
1938	Les Bolstad	
1937	Al Clasen (a)	
1936	Charles "Pat" Sawyer	
1935	Charles "Pat" Sawyer	
1934	Joe Coria (a)	
1933	Les Bolstad	
1932	Carson "Lee" Herron	
1931	No tournament	
1930	Edward Baening	
1929	Jock Hendry	
1928	Jimmy Johnston (a)	
1927	Jimmy Johnston (a)	
1926	George Smith	
1925	Harry Legg (a)	
1924	George Smith	
1923	Jack Burke Sr.	
1922	Tom Stevens	
1921	Jack Burke Sr.	
1920	Jack Burke Sr.	
1919	Jack Burke Sr.	
1918	George Sargent	
1917	Tom Stevens	

(a) denotes amateur
^{1} Playoff win
