= Joe Stansberry =

American golfer (born 1956)

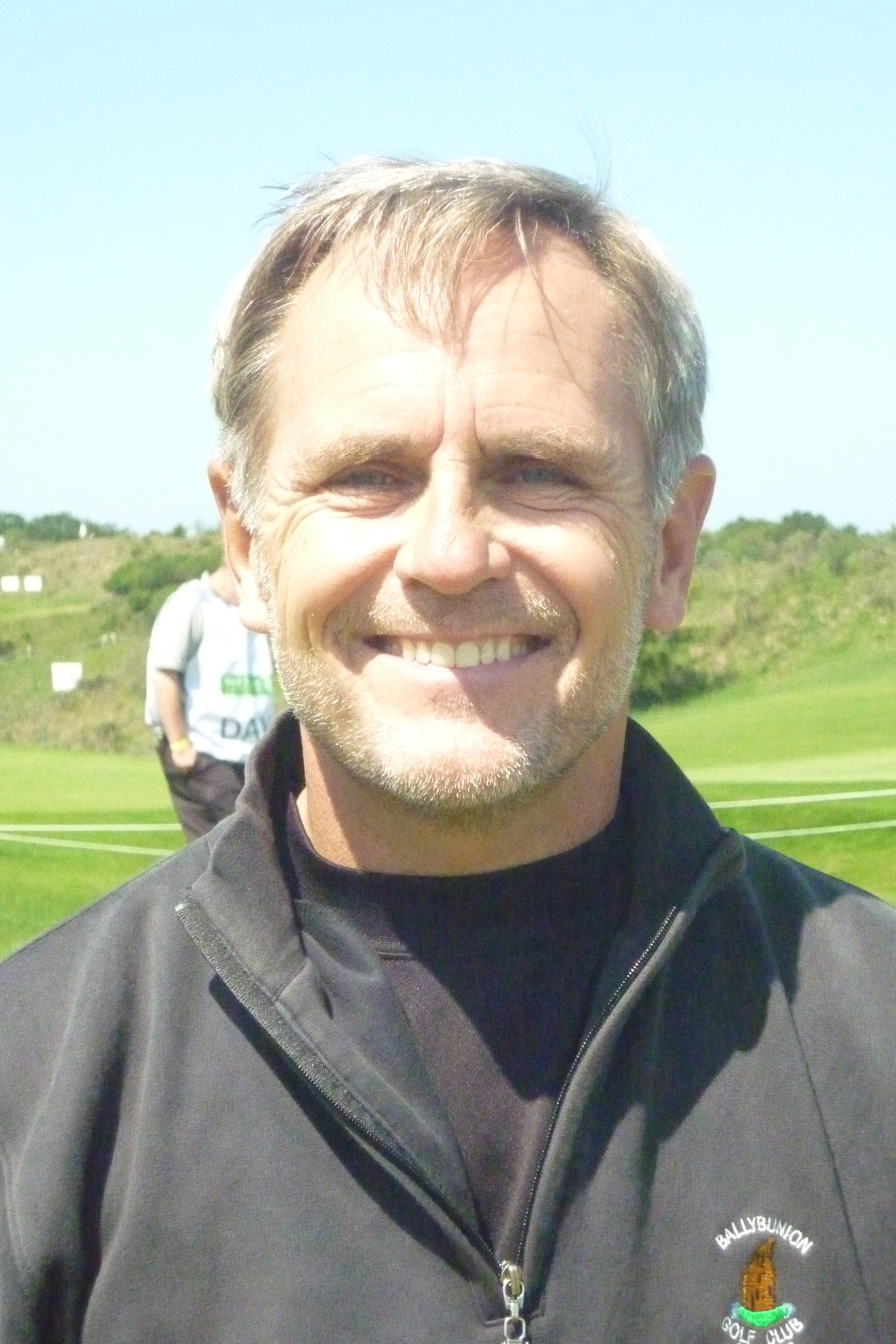

Personal information
- Nationality: United States
- Born: March 17, 1956 (age 70) Minneapolis, Minnesota, U.S.
- Height: 5 ft 6 in (1.68 m)

Career
- Sport: Golf
- College: University of New Mexico
- Turned professional: 1980 and 2006 (regained amateur status in 1993)
- Professional wins: 3

Joe Stansberry (born March 17, 1956) is an American professional golfer.

== Early life ==
Stansberry was born in Minneapolis, Minnesota. He attended the University of New Mexico.

== Golf career ==
He turned professional in 1980 before regaining his amateur status in 1993. He then had a successful amateur career which included winning the 2003 Minnesota State Open and a semi-final appearance in the 1997 U.S. Amateur Public Links Championship. He turned professional again when he turned 50 in 2006 and tried to qualify for the Champions Tour. He failed to win a place on the tour, but has played in a few tournaments, recording a best finish of tied for 26th at the 2008 3M Championship.

Despite not making onto the Champions Tour, Stansberry has had some success as a senior, including victories at the 2008 Colorado Senior Open and the 2009 Texas Senior Open.

== Amateur wins ==
- 1993 MGA Mid-Amateur
- 1995 MGA Mid-Amateur, MGA Players' Championship
- 1996 Minnesota State Amateur
- 1997 MGA Amateur championship
- 2005 Minnesota State Amateur

== Professional wins ==
- 2003 Minnesota State Open (as an amateur)
- 2008 Colorado Senior Open
- 2009 Maker's Mark Texas Senior Open
