= Jim Ahern (golfer) =

American professional golfer (born 1949)

Personal information
- Full name: James Russell Ahern
- Nationality: United States
- Born: February 26, 1949 (age 77) Duluth, Minnesota, U.S.
- Height: 5 ft 9 in (1.75 m)
- Weight: 160 lb (73 kg; 11 st)

Career
- Sport: Golf
- College: Oklahoma State University
- Turned professional: 1972
- Former tours: PGA Tour; Champions Tour
- Professional wins: 5

Number of wins by tour
- PGA Tour Champions: 2
- Other: 3

Best results in major championships
- Masters Tournament: DNP
- PGA Championship: CUT: 1978
- U.S. Open: CUT: 1972
- The Open Championship: DNP

James Russell Ahern (born February 26, 1949) is an American professional golfer who played on the PGA Tour and the Champions Tour.

== Early life ==
Ahern was born in Duluth, Minnesota. He attended Oklahoma State University.

== Professional career ==
In 1972, Ahern turned professional. He toiled in relative obscurity on the PGA Tour in the 1970s, never finishing higher than ninth in 60 tournaments. He lost his card at the end of the 1975 season.

Ahern became the head pro at the Des Moines Golf and Country Club in 1980 and five years later founded Executive Golf Ltd., a golf concierge firm that arranges weekend golf instruction retreats for high-end and Fortune 500 clients.

Ahern joined the Senior PGA Tour after turning 50 in February 1999 and has two wins on this circuit.

== Personal life ==
He lives in Phoenix, Arizona.

== Professional wins (5) ==
=== Regular wins (3) ===
- 1977 Minnesota PGA Championship
- 1982 North Dakota Open
- 1991 North Dakota Open

=== Champions Tour wins (2) ===
No.	Date	Tournament	Winning score	Margin of victory	Runner-up
1	Aug 29, 1999	AT&T Canada Senior Open Championship	−16 (67-68-69-68=272)	Playoff	(United States) Hale Irwin
2	Jun 1, 2003	Music City Championship	−20 (64-63-69=196)	4 strokes	(Spain) José María Cañizares

Champions Tour playoff record (1–0)

No.	Year	Tournament	Opponent	Result
1	1999	AT&T Canada Senior Open Championship	(United States) Hale Irwin	Won with par on second extra hole

== Results in senior majors ==
Results not in chronological order before 2008

Tournament	1999	2000	2001	2002
Senior PGA Championship	DNP	T8	T40	T18
U.S. Senior Open	T18	CUT	T7	T31
The Tradition	DNP	T19	T12	T57
Senior Players Championship	DNP	T64	T28	T33

Tournament	2003	2004	2005	2006	2007	2008
Senior PGA Championship	CUT	CUT	T40	T68	CUT	T46
Senior British Open Championship	70	DNP	DNP	DNP	DNP	DNP
U.S. Senior Open	T35	T44	CUT	CUT	T50	DNP
The Tradition	T2	T36	T56	T49	DNP	DNP
Senior Players Championship	T71	T39	T53	T65	T67	DNP

The Senior British Open was not a Champions Tour major until 2003
DNP = did not play
CUT = missed the halfway cut
"T" indicates a tie for a place
Yellow background for top-10.

== See also ==
- 1972 PGA Tour Qualifying School graduates
