= Donald Constable =

American golfer (born 1989)

Personal information
- Nationality: United States
- Born: March 1, 1989 (age 37) Minnetonka, Minnesota, U.S.
- Height: 6 ft 0 in (183 cm)
- Weight: 190 lb (86 kg)
- Spouse: Melissa

Career
- Sport: Golf
- College: University of Texas; University of Minnesota
- Turned professional: 2012 (Note: Regained amateur status in May 2021.)
- Former tours: PGA Tour; Web.com Tour; PGA Tour Canada
- Professional wins: 4

Best results in major championships
- Masters Tournament: DNP
- PGA Championship: DNP
- U.S. Open: CUT: 2014
- The Open Championship: DNP

Donald Constable (born March 1, 1989) is an American former professional golfer who has regained his amateur status.

== Previous amateur career ==
Constable played two years for the Texas Longhorns and two years for the Minnesota Golden Gophers.

He won the 2010 North and South Amateur. He was also the Minnesota high school and Minnesota Amateur champion.

== Professional career ==
Constable qualified for the 2013 PGA Tour, making his way through all rounds of qualifying school. On the PGA Tour, he failed in make the cut in all 16 events he played in 2013. He later played on the Web.com Tour and PGA Tour Canada.

In 2014, he won the Waterloo Open Golf Classic.

== Return to amateur status ==
After a seven year professional career, Constable regained his amateur status in May 2021.

== Amateur wins ==
- 2005 Minnesota State Junior Boys' Championship
- 2009 Minnesota Amateur Match Play Championship
- 2010 North and South Amateur
- 2011 Minnesota Amateur
- 2012 Terra Cotta Invitational

== Professional wins ==
- 2013 Coors Light Open
- 2014 Waterloo Open Golf Classic
- 2017 Pro-Am Jam, Western North Dakota Charity Pro-Am (both Dakotas Tour)

== Results in major championships ==
Tournament	2014
Masters Tournament	
U.S. Open	CUT
The Open Championship	
PGA Championship	

Did not play

CUT = missed the half-way cut

== See also ==
- 2012 PGA Tour Qualifying School graduates
