= Fall 1969 PGA Tour Qualifying School graduates =

This is a list of the Fall 1969 PGA Tour Qualifying School graduates.

== Tournament summary ==
There were nine district tournaments to determine the final field of 48 players for the qualifying tournament. One of the district tryouts was at Desert Forest Golf Club in Carefree, Arizona. Fourteen players competed for four spots. These players included former Arizona State University "stars" Ted Lyford and Mike Morley. In the three-round tournament, Morley shot a final round 65 to earn medallist honors. Arnold Salinas, "the young protege of El Paso's Lee Trevino," finished two strokes behind him at 216. Mike Evans finished in third place at 227. Ben Kern and Bruce Defeleur finished tied for fourth place at 228. There was a sudden-death playoff to determine who was allocated the fourth and final spot. Kern defeated Defeleur on the first hole.

The final qualifying tournament was played at PGA National Golf Club in Palm Beach Gardens, Florida in early November. Twenty-two of these players had been unsuccessful at PGA Tour Qualifying Tournament in previous years. During the finals, aging star Gene Sarazen addressed the class. He primarily spoke of the sizable purses for the 1970 PGA Tour and ending slow play. Of the 48 player field, 12 earned their tour card.

== List of graduates ==
| # | Player | Notes |
|---|---|---|
| 1 | (United States) Doug Olson | |
| 2 | (United States) Mike Morley | |
| 3 | (United States) Bill Brask | Winner of 1968 Big Ten Championship |
| 4 | (United States) Michael Mitchell | |
| 5 | (United States) Jack Lewis Jr. | |
| T6 | (United States) John Baldwin | |
| T6 | (Scotland) Brian Barnes | Winner of 1969 Agfa-Gevaert Tournament |
| T8 | (United States) Ronald Acree | |
| T8 | (Canada) Ben Kern | |
| 10 | (United States) James Barker | |
| 11 | (United States) Dennis Murphy | |
| 12 | (Canada) Gary Bowerman | |
