= Terra Cotta Invitational =

Tournament information
- Location: Naples, Florida
- Established: 1996
- Course: Naples National Golf Club
- Organized by: Naples National Golf Club
- Format: 54-hole stroke play
- Month played: April

Current champion
- Connor Doyal

The Terra Cotta Invitational is an annual amateur golf tournament. It has been played since 1996 at Naples National Golf Club in Naples, Florida.

It is a "category B" tournament in the World Amateur Golf Ranking, meaning it is one of the top 100 men's amateur tournaments in the world.

== Winners ==
- 2026 Connor Doyal
- 2025 Luke Colton
- 2024 Luke Colton
- 2023 Quentin Debove
- 2022 Caleb Surratt
- 2021 Caleb Surratt
- 2020 Canceled
- 2019 Alex Vogelsong
- 2018 Fernando Barco
- 2017 Chris Nido
- 2016 Tony Gil
- 2015 Jorge García
- 2014 Davis Riley
- 2013 Nathan Kimsey
- 2012 Donald Constable
- 2011 Emiliano Grillo
- 2010 Justin Thomas
- 2009 Matt Ceravolo
- 2008 Bud Cauley
- 2007 Peter Uihlein
- 2006 Arnond Vongvanij
- 2005 Tommy Brennan
- 2004 Danny Green
- 2003 Casey Wittenberg
- 2002 John Harris
- 2001 Tom McKnight
- 2000 Danny Green
- 1999 Sean Knapp
- 1998 Gene Elliott
- 1997 Matt Kuchar
- 1996 Jerry Courville Jr.
