= Jack Burke Sr. =

American golfer (1888–1943)

Personal information
- Full name: John Joseph Burke Sr.
- Nickname: Jack
- Nationality: United States
- Born: March 28, 1888 Philadelphia, Pennsylvania, U.S.
- Died: February 2, 1943 (aged 54) Houston, Texas, U.S.

Career
- Sport: Golf
- Status: Professional
- Professional wins: 6

Best results in major championships
- Masters Tournament: DNP
- PGA Championship: R16: 1925
- U.S. Open: T2: 1920
- The Open Championship: DNP

John Joseph Burke Sr. (March 28, 1888 – February 2, 1943) was an American professional golfer.

== Professional career ==
Burke finished in a tie for second place in the 1913 Canadian Open and also in the 1920 U.S. Open. Burke is credited with one PGA Tour win, one second-place, and three third-place showings in PGA Tour events, with 14 top-10s and 19 top-25s.

Burke won the Minnesota State Open four times.

== Personal life ==
He was the father of Jack Burke Jr.

== Professional wins (6) ==
Note: This list may be incomplete.

- 1919 Minnesota State Open
- 1920 Minnesota State Open
- 1921 Minnesota State Open
- 1923 Minnesota State Open
- 1936 Texas PGA Championship
- 1941 Senior PGA Championship

== Results in major championships ==
Tournament	1907	1908	1909
U.S. Open	49		T30
PGA Championship	NYF	NYF	NYF

Tournament	1910	1911	1912	1913	1914	1915	1916	1917	1918	1919
U.S. Open	27	T18			T28		T33	NT	NT	
PGA Championship	NYF	NYF	NYF	NYF	NYF	NYF		NT	NT	

Tournament	1920	1921	1922	1923	1924	1925	1926	1927	1928	1929
U.S. Open	T2	WD	T28	38					T31	T27
PGA Championship						R16			R32	

Tournament	1930	1931	1932	1933	1934	1935	1936	1937	1938	1939	1940
U.S. Open	T58							CUT		CUT	CUT
PGA Championship											

Note: Burke never played in the Masters Tournament or The Open Championship.

Top 10
Did not play

NYF = Tournament not yet founded
NT = No tournament
CUT = missed the halfway cut
WD = Withdrew
R64, R32, R16, QF, SF = Round in which player lost in PGA Championship match play
"T" indicates a tie for a place
