= Chris Perry (golfer) =

American professional golfer (born 1961)

Personal information
- Full name: James Christopher Perry
- Nationality: United States
- Born: September 27, 1961 (age 65) Edenton, North Carolina, U.S.
- Height: 6 ft 1 in (1.85 m)
- Weight: 195 lb (88 kg; 13.9 st)

Career
- Sport: Golf
- College: Ohio State University
- Turned professional: 1984
- Current tour: PGA Tour
- Former tour: Nike Tour
- Professional wins: 4
- Highest ranking: 21 (April 30, 2000)

Number of wins by tour
- PGA Tour: 1
- Korn Ferry Tour: 1
- Other: 2

Best results in major championships
- Masters Tournament: T14: 2000
- PGA Championship: T10: 1999
- U.S. Open: T19: 2001
- The Open Championship: CUT: 2000

Achievements and awards
- Nike Tour money list winner: 1994
- Nike Tour Player of the Year: 1994

James Christopher Perry (born September 27, 1961) is an American professional golfer. He has been featured in the top 50 of the Official World Golf Ranking.

== Amateur career ==
Perry was born in Edenton, North Carolina. He was the Minnesota high school golf champion in 1978, 1979 and 1980. Perry attended the Ohio State University where he was a three-time All-America selection. He finished runner-up in the 1983 U.S. Amateur. Perry was named Collegiate Player of the Year in 1984. He also captured the 1983 Big Ten Championship. He won the 1982 and 1983 Minnesota State Amateur and 1984 Minnesota State Open.

== Professional career ==
Perry turned pro in 1984. He played on the PGA Tour from 1985 to 1992. He split time between the PGA Tour and the Nike Tour in 1993, and played on the Nike Tour full-time in 1994. In 1994 he was named the Nike Tour Player of the Year and also led the money list. He won the Nike Utah Classic on the Nike Tour in 1994 and the 1994 Mexican Open. He then played on the PGA Tour from 1995 to 2001. He won the B.C. Open in 1998, his only PGA Tour victory. 1999 was Perry's best year on tour; he earned $2,145,707 and finished fifth on the money list. He recorded two runner-up finishes, and his 14 top-10 finishes were second only to Tiger Woods' 16. He cracked the top 50 of the Official World Golf Rankings due to his successful year.

Perry suffered left hand and wrist injuries at the 2001 Open Championship, causing him to play in only a few events in 2002. He was granted a major medical extension for 2003 but was still too injured to play on tour regularly. He received a second major medical extension for 2004 but only played in one event. He had surgery for a pinched nerve in his elbow in February 2004 and was told by his doctor that it would take 18 months to two years to fully recover. He has been granted medical extensions every year since 2003 but has played in very few events due to the injuries. He has not played in a PGA Tour event since 2006.

== Personal life ==
Perry also played baseball and hockey while growing up. He was captain of the Edina-West High School hockey team during the 1979–80 season.

Perry's father, Jim, pitched in Major League Baseball and won 215 games and was the 1970 American League Cy Young Award winner. His uncle Gaylord Perry also pitched in MLB, was a winner of 315 games and is a member of the Baseball Hall of Fame.

== Awards and honors ==
- In 1984, Perry earned Collegiate Player of the Year.
- In 1993, Perry was inducted into the Ohio State Varsity O Hall of Fame.
- In 1994, Perry won the Nike Tour money list.
- In 1994, Perry earned Nike Tour Player of the Year honors.

== Amateur wins ==
this list may be incomplete

- 1982 Northeast Amateur
- 1982 Minnesota State Amateur
- 1983 Minnesota State Amateur

== Professional wins (4) ==
=== PGA Tour wins (1) ===
| No. | Date | Tournament | Winning score | Margin of victory | Runner-up |
|---|---|---|---|---|---|
| 1 | Sep 25, 1998 | B.C. Open | −15 (67-70-69-67=273) | 3 strokes | (United States) Peter Jacobsen |

=== Nike Tour wins (1) ===
| No. | Date | Tournament | Winning score | Margin of victory | Runner-up |
|---|---|---|---|---|---|
| 1 | Sep 11, 1994 | Nike Utah Classic | −11 (69-68-68=205) | 1 stroke | (United States) David Duval |

Nike Tour playoff record (0–1)

| No. | Year | Tournament | Opponent | Result |
|---|---|---|---|---|
| 1 | 1994 | Nike Mississippi Gulf Coast Classic | (United States) John Elliott | Lost to par on first extra hole |

=== Other wins (2) ===
- 1984 Minnesota State Open (as an amateur)
- 1994 Mexican Open

== Results in major championships ==
| Tournament | 1982 | 1983 | 1984 | 1985 | 1986 | 1987 | 1988 | 1989 |
|---|---|---|---|---|---|---|---|---|
| Masters Tournament | | | CUT | | | | | |
| U.S. Open | CUT | | | CUT | CUT | | | T54 |
| The Open Championship | | | | | | | | |
| PGA Championship | | | | | | T28 | | T17 |

| Tournament | 1990 | 1991 | 1992 | 1993 | 1994 | 1995 | 1996 | 1997 | 1998 | 1999 | 2000 | 2001 |
|---|---|---|---|---|---|---|---|---|---|---|---|---|
| Masters Tournament | | | | | | | | | | T50 | T14 | T37 |
| U.S. Open | | T31 | | | CUT | T56 | | T43 | T25 | T42 | T32 | T19 |
| The Open Championship | | | | | | | | WD | | | CUT | WD |
| PGA Championship | T26 | | | | | | | T49 | 74 | T10 | T34 | CUT |

Top 10
Did not play

CUT = missed the half-way cut
WD = Withdrew
"T" = tied

=== Summary ===
| Tournament | Wins | 2nd | 3rd | Top-5 | Top-10 | Top-25 | Events | Cuts made |
|---|---|---|---|---|---|---|---|---|
| Masters Tournament | 0 | 0 | 0 | 0 | 0 | 1 | 4 | 3 |
| U.S. Open | 0 | 0 | 0 | 0 | 0 | 2 | 12 | 8 |
| The Open Championship | 0 | 0 | 0 | 0 | 0 | 0 | 3 | 0 |
| PGA Championship | 0 | 0 | 0 | 0 | 1 | 2 | 8 | 7 |
| Totals | 0 | 0 | 0 | 0 | 1 | 5 | 27 | 18 |

- Most consecutive cuts made – 8 (1997 PGA – 2000 U.S. Open)
- Longest streak of top-10s – 1

== Results in The Players Championship ==
| Tournament | 1985 | 1986 | 1987 | 1988 | 1989 | 1990 | 1991 | 1992 | 1993 | 1994 | 1995 | 1996 | 1997 | 1998 | 1999 | 2000 |
|---|---|---|---|---|---|---|---|---|---|---|---|---|---|---|---|---|
| The Players Championship | T55 | T54 | T20 | T64 | T21 | T16 | T27 | CUT | | | | | T31 | CUT | T32 | T33 |

Did not play

CUT = missed the halfway cut
"T" indicates a tie for a place

== Results in World Golf Championships ==
| Tournament | 1999 | 2000 | 2001 |
|---|---|---|---|
| Match Play | | R64 | R32 |
| Championship | T7 | 16 | NT^{1} |
| Invitational | | | |

^{1}Cancelled due to 9/11

Top 10
Did not play

QF, R16, R32, R64 = Round in which player lost in match play
"T" = Tied
NT = No tournament

== See also ==
- 1984 PGA Tour Qualifying School graduates
- 1994 Nike Tour graduates
