= Gary Jacobson (golfer) =

American golfer

Personal information
- Nationality: United States
- Born: c. 1952

Career
- Sport: Golf
- College: Arizona State University
- Status: Professional
- Former tour: PGA Tour

Best results in major championships
- Masters Tournament: CUT: 1978
- PGA Championship: DNP
- U.S. Open: T5: 1977
- The Open Championship: T58: 1977

Gary Jacobson (born c. 1953) is an American former PGA Tour professional golfer.

== Career ==
Jacobson finished in a tie for fifth at the 1977 U.S. Open. He played on the PGA Tour in 1978, making only two cuts in 15 tournaments.

As of May 1979, Jacobson was beginning to change careers. He was learning to be a sales representative at Northern Printing of Minneapolis.

== See also ==
- Fall 1977 PGA Tour Qualifying School graduates
