= Lester Park Golf Course =

Golf course in Duluth, Minnesota, United States

Coordinates: 46°50′55″N 92°00′02″W

- Interactive map of Lester Park Golf Course

Club information
- Established: 1934
- Type: Private/public
- Owner: City of Duluth
- Operator: Billy Casper Golf
- Tota holes: 27
- Tournaments: Better Brand's Lakeview Medal 1950-current Miller Lite Early Bird; LPGC RAW
- Website: GolfinDuluth.com

Front/Back
- Par: 72
- Length: 6828 yards
- Course rating: 70.8

Lake Nine
- Par: 36
- Length: 3417 yards
- Course rating: 36.3

Lester Park Golf Course is one of two public golf courses located in the port city of Duluth, Minnesota. The original eighteen-hole golf course was made up the north shore of Duluth, near the Lester River. The golf course was established in 1934. The other course, Enger Park, is located near the Duluth landmark, Enger Tower, and was established earlier than Lester in the 1920s. Lester Park is well known around Minnesota for its spectacular beauty and rich history as a golf course because a unique view of Lake Superior is available on 20 of its 27 golf holes. The original 18 holes have been redone four times since their initial design. A third “Lake 9” course was added in 1985, offering a longer and more challenging layout. In 1997, Paul Schintz, a former club pro from St. Paul, took over Lester Park as PGA Golf Professional. In 2003, Schintz became the Director of Golf, overseeing both Lester Park and Enger Park clubhouse operations. The golf courses were split to a 2 golf pro / 2 contract setup in 2005 with the addition of Steve Anderson to Enger Park Golf Course, with Schintz remaining at Lester Park. In 2007, the Duluth city council voted to accept a contract with Professional Golf Management, Inc. to oversee clubhouse and maintenance operations. The Management company consisted of partners Schintz, as PGA Golf Professional and Jud Crist, Golf Course Superintendent, and operated both golf facilities for the City of Duluth from 2007 to 2014. In 2015, the Duluth city council voted to accept a new contract with Billy Casper Golf to oversee clubhouse and course maintenance. Billy Casper Golf managed both Lester Park and Enger Park from 2015 to 2019. The city of Duluth closed the Lester Park course in 2020 under COVID cutbacks, and it has not re-opened since. The city has been evaluating development options at the Lester Park site, which could include a permanent closure of Lester Park golf operations. Sale of the Lake 9 land was approved in 2023, but use of the remaining Lester Park course site has not yet been determined. Lester Park's front and back nines are a full par 72 golf course and has a yardage of 6,828 yards from the longest tees.

== History ==
The history of the golf course started with the glaciation of Minnesota providing a rich landscape of hills and fertile soil; prime golf course potential to the developers of Duluth. The current course that was available at the time was too far for some people to commit to so the city decided to build another golf course in 1934 out in the northeastern part of the city. The land for city development in Lakeside was donated in 1890 by Oliver Iron Mining president Thomas Cole.

== The course ==
The golf course has 27 holes with an 18-hole course and then a tougher, more challenging, 9-hole course. The grass itself in the fairway is a bluegrass of the Poa Genus. The greens were originally designed with Bermuda Grass but due to recent harsh weathers the grass on the green has been switched in many spots to bentgrass due to bent's ability to survive in harsher conditions, and for its ability to be cut at very short lengths without being damaged and allowing for a lot of foot traffic at the same time. The course contains four different sets of tee boxes ranging from a red colored tee, known for being the shortest distance to the hole; the farthest tees are blue colored. A group making tee times at the golf course, unless larger than 10 people can usually call up to one week in advance to obtain a desired tee time. The Cancellation policy as stated on their website says that 24 hours is the maximum time to cancel.
