= The Minikahda Club =

Golf course and club in Minneapolis, Minnesota

Coordinates: 44.943°N 93.322°W

- Interactive map of The Minikahda Club

Club information
- Location: Minneapolis, Minnesota
- Established: 1898, 128 years ago
- Type: Private
- Tournaments: U.S. Open: 1916; U.S. Amateur: 1927; Walker Cup: 1957; U.S. Women's Amateur: 1988; Curtis Cup: 1998; U.S. Senior Amateur: 2017
- Website: minikahdaclub.org
- Designed by: Donald Ross
- Par: 72
- Length: 6,815 yards (6,232 m)
- Course rating: 73.4
- Slope rating: 143
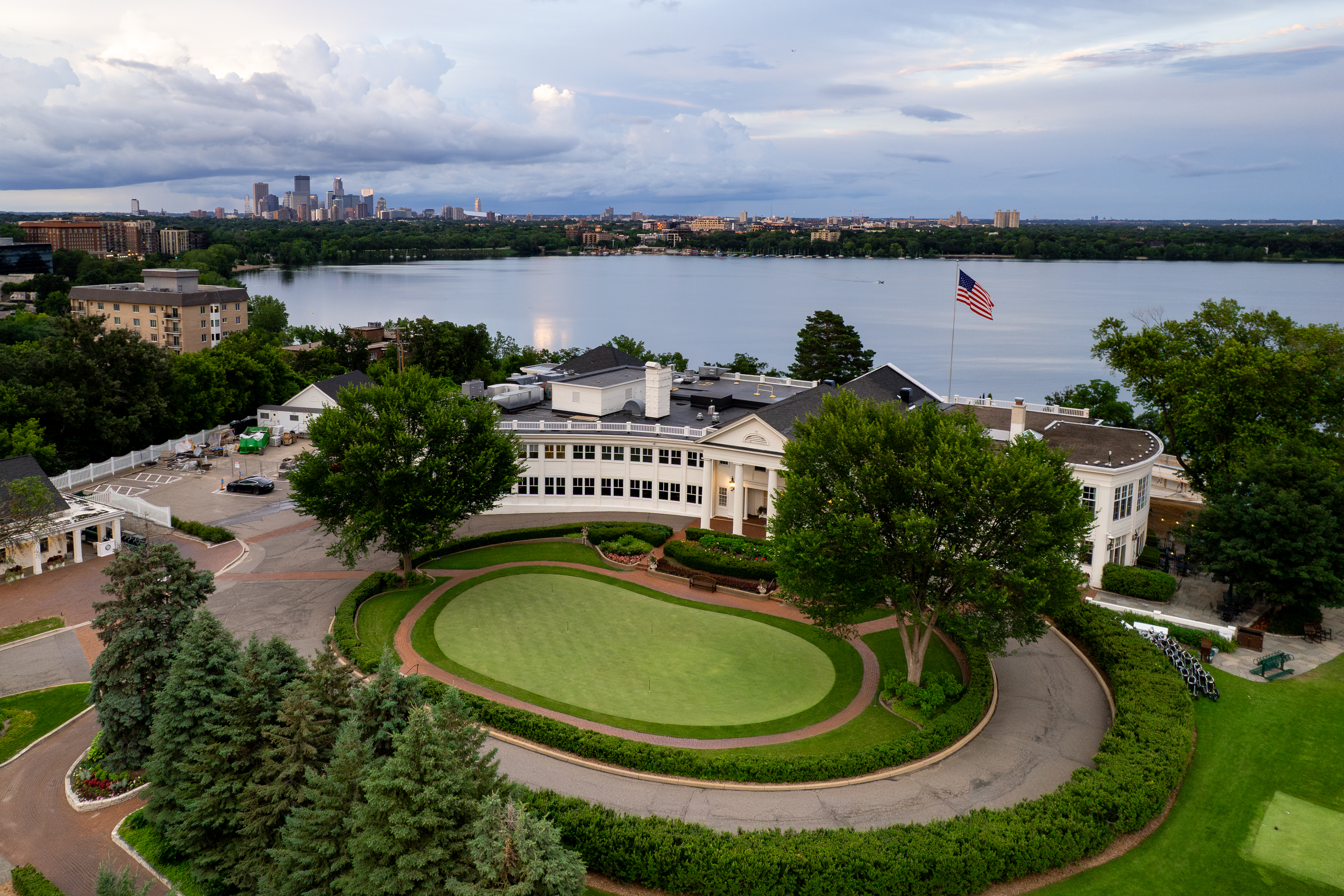

The Minikahda Club is a private country club in southwest Minneapolis, Minnesota. The club is located just west of Bde Maka Ska and is the oldest country club west of the Mississippi River. Minikahda's clubhouse, which is situated on a high hill, overlooks the lake and has expansive views of the surrounding area and the Minneapolis skyline. In 1898, it was established by a group of wealthy Minneapolis families. The club’s golf course has been named one of the top 100 classic golf courses in the United States by Golfweek. Over the course of its history, Minikahda has hosted some of the most significant tournaments in the United States including the U.S. Open, the U.S. Amateur, and the Walker Cup.

== History ==
In 1898, Minikahda was founded. It is located on the hills above the west shore of Bde Maka Ska. The land was purchased from the Oglala Lakota Chief "Swift Dog" who owned the land in which the golf course stands to this day. At the time, there were no roads around the lake, so the property extended to the lake, with a boathouse for sailing and other aquatic activities. The name Minikahda comes from the Lakota, a combination of two native words meaning "by the side of the water." The club logo is a Native American shield, similar to the original artifact which is framed in the clubhouse, the shield belonging to Swift Dog himself.

Minikahda owns an 18-hole golf course extending to the south and west of the clubhouse with holes on either side of Excelsior Boulevard that is open to members at any time during the golf season. Included on the grounds are a putting green, a chipping green, a driving range, and an iron range as practice areas.

The club has hosted a number of significant tournaments. They include the 1916 U.S. Open, the 1927 U.S. Amateur, the 1957 Walker Cup, the 1988 U.S. Women's Amateur, the 1998 Curtis Cup, and the 2017 U.S. Senior Amateur.

== Golf course architects ==
- Willie Watson (1899): Watson, who was the club's first professional, laid out the original nine-hole course.
- Robert Foulis (1907): Foulis, a Scottish professional golfer and course designer, oversaw the expansion of the course to 18 holes.
- Tom Bendelow (1908): Bendelow, made some minor modifications to the course shortly after its completion.
- Donald Ross (1920): Ross redesigned the course after the club hosted the 1916 U.S. Open.
- Geoffrey Cornish and Craig Schreiner (1988–1992): Course lengthening and forward tee additions.
- Ron Prichard (2001): Prichard, known for his restorations of Donald Ross courses, was called in to design and execute a project restoring original green sizes/shapes and reconstructing many bunkers.
- Kyle Franz (2018): Franz was commissioned to develop a golf course master plan to bring back many of the Ross features enjoyed in 1927 when the U.S. Amateur was won by Bobby Jones. The master plan work was completed in the fall of 2021.
