= 2022 Minnesota Attorney General election =

- November 8, 2022
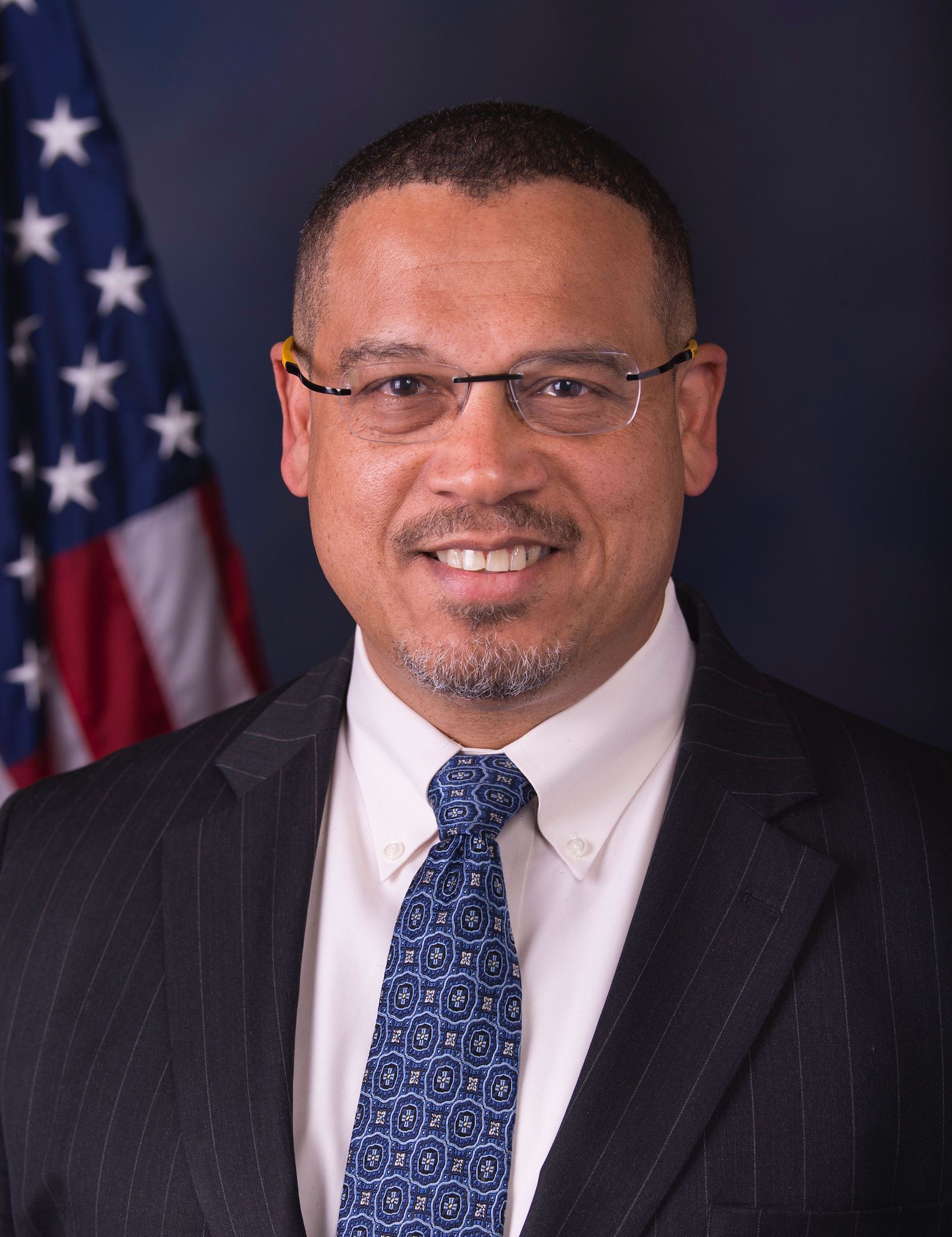

| Nominee | Keith Ellison | Jim Schultz |
| Party | Democratic (DFL) | Republican |
| Popular vote | 1,254,371 | 1,233,556 |
| Percentage | 50.37% | 49.53% |
- Ellison: 50–60% 60–70% 70–80% 80–90% >90% Schultz: 50–60% 60–70% 70–80% 80–90% >90%
Attorney General before election
Keith Ellison
Democratic (DFL)
Elected Attorney General
Keith Ellison
Democratic (DFL)

The 2022 Minnesota Attorney General election was held on November 8, 2022, to elect the attorney general of the U.S. state of Minnesota. Incumbent DFLer Keith Ellison narrowly won (50.37% to 49.53%) reelection to a second term against Republican challenger Jim Schultz.

This attorney general election marked the fourteenth in a row won by the DFL. Schultz improved over 2018 Republican nominee Doug Wardlow in rural counties, but Ellison's increased margins in the Twin Cities metropolitan area were too much to overcome. It was the closest attorney general race in the state since 1956, and the second-closest ever.

== Background ==
Minnesota's attorney general is the chief legal officer of the state, tasked with representing over 100 state agencies in legal proceedings. The attorney general also enforces some consumer protection regulations, such as anti-trust laws. While most cases the office undertakes are civil in nature, the attorney general may assist counties with complex criminal cases.

=== History and nature of the office ===
Prior to the 2022 election, Minnesota Republicans had not won the attorney general's office since 1966 when Douglas Head won the office, and Republicans had only held the office for four years since 1954. The office has also been a launching pad for candidates to run for the governorship; every Minnesota attorney general since Head has gone on to run for governor.

=== Synopsis of Ellison's tenure ===
In 2018, then-U.S. Representative Keith Ellison was elected to replace retiring fellow DFLer Lori Swanson, who ran unsuccessfully for governor. Ellison was the first Black person elected to statewide office in Minnesota, and the first Muslim elected to any statewide office in the United States.

As Attorney General, Ellison played a key role in the state's prosecution of Derek Chauvin and pushed for policing reforms in the aftermath of the murder of George Floyd. Ellison's role greatly increased his influence and notoriety nationally and internationally.

Ellison also led his office's legal actions against businesses which violated COVID-19-related restrictions. This included both businesses which opened for in-person service in violation of public health orders, and some which engaged in illegal price gouging.

== Democratic–Farmer–Labor primary ==
Ellison announced that he would run for reelection on November 15, 2021. Bill Dahn, a perennial candidate, also ran.

Only Ellison sought the DFL endorsement at the party's May 2022 convention. He won endorsement unanimously and went on to win the primary convincingly.

=== Candidates ===
==== Nominee ====
- Keith Ellison, incumbent attorney general

==== Eliminated in primary ====
- Bill Dahn, perennial candidate

=== Results ===
Results by county: Ellison: 70–80%; 80–90%; 90–100%

Democratic (DFL) primary results
| Party | Candidate | Votes | % |
|---|---|---|---|
| Democratic (DFL) | Keith Ellison (incumbent) | 378,367 | 89.35 |
| Democratic (DFL) | Bill Dahn | 45,110 | 10.65 |
| Total votes | | 423,477 | 100.00 |

== Republican primary ==
The first Republican to enter the race was MyPillow General Counsel and 2018 Republican nominee Doug Wardlow on February 16, 2021. Wardlow announced his run in a video on Twitter, blaming Ellison for unrest in the Twin Cities following the murder of George Floyd.

Former State Representative Dennis Smith of Maple Grove announced his run for attorney general on June 7, 2021. In a campaign video, he emphasized his desire to promote trust in the attorney general's office and depoliticize the office.

A month later on July 6, 2021, Lynne Torgerson, a lawyer from Minneapolis, announced her run. She called COVID-19 restrictions "destructive" and accused Ellison of "threatening Minnesotans' freedoms and rights."

Private lawyer Jim Schultz of Minnetonka announced his run for the office on December 9, 2021. It was Schultz's first run for office, and his campaign was chaired by former Minnesota Republican Party Chair Ron Eibensteiner.

The final major candidate to enter the race was former state legislator, and Hennepin County commissioner, and Washington County judge Tad Jude. He announced his run for attorney general on January 31, 2022.

=== Candidates ===
==== Nominee ====
- Jim Schultz, business lawyer (endorsed by state party)

==== Eliminated in primary ====
- Sharon Anderson, Republican nominee for attorney general in 1994
- Doug Wardlow, former state representative and nominee for attorney general in 2018

==== Withdrew at convention ====
- Tad Jude, former judge of the 10th district court of Minnesota (subsequently withdrew and endorsed Schultz) (unsuccessfully ran for Hennepin County Attorney)
- Dennis Smith, former state representative (subsequently withdrew and endorsed Schultz)
- Lynne Torgerson, attorney and independent candidate for Minnesota's 5th congressional district in 2010

=== Endorsements ===
Tad Jude

State legislators

- Tom Bakk, state senator and former Majority Leader of the Minnesota Senate (Independent)

=== Polling ===
| Poll source | Date(s) administered | Sample size (Note: Key: A – all adults RV – registered voters LV – likely voters V – unclear) | Margin of error | Sharon Anderson | Jim Schultz | Doug Wardlow | Undecided |
|---|---|---|---|---|---|---|---|
| Change Research | Jun. 3–8, 2022 | – (LV) | – | 4.0% | 19.6% | 19.4% | 57.0% (Note: "Not sure" with 55.0%, and "would not vote" with 2.1%) |

=== Debate ===
A debate was held on March 31 at the Providence Academy Performing Arts Center. Jude, Schultz and Wardlow were in attendance.

=== Results ===
Results by county: Schultz: 40–50%; 50–60%; 60-70%; Wardlow: 40–50%

Republican primary results
| Party | Candidate | Votes | % |
|---|---|---|---|
| Republican | Jim Schultz | 163,944 | 52.51 |
| Republican | Doug Wardlow | 108,537 | 34.76 |
| Republican | Sharon Anderson | 39,723 | 12.72 |
| Total votes | | 312,204 | 100.00 |

== Independents ==
=== Candidates ===
==== Declined ====
- Richard Painter, University of Minnesota Law School professor, former White House ethics lawyer under President George W. Bush, and candidate for U.S. Senate in 2018 (running for Congress)

== General election ==
=== Predictions ===
| Source | Ranking | As of |
|---|---|---|
| Sabato's Crystal Ball | Tossup | November 3, 2022 |
| Elections Daily | Leans R (flip) | November 7, 2022 |

=== Endorsements ===
Keith Ellison (DFL)

Presidents

- Joe Biden, President of the United States (2021–2025)

Vice Presidents

- Kamala Harris, Vice President of the United States (2021–2025)

U.S. Senators

- Amy Klobuchar, U.S. Senator from Minnesota (2007–present)
- Bernie Sanders, U.S. Senator from Vermont (2007–present), former U.S. Representative from VT-AL (1991–2007)
- Tina Smith, U.S. Senator from Minnesota (2018–present), former Lieutenant Governor of Minnesota (2015–2018)

U.S. Representatives

- Cori Bush, U.S. Representative from MO-01 (2021–2025)
- Gabby Giffords, former U.S. Representative from AZ-08 (2007–2012)
- Pramila Jayapal, U.S. Representative from WA-07 (2017–present)
- Betty McCollum, U.S. Representative from MN-04 (2001–present)
- Ilhan Omar, U.S. Representative from MN-05 (2019–present)

Governors

- Mark Dayton, former Governor of Minnesota (2011–2019), former U.S. Senator from Minnesota (2001–2007)

Lieutenant Governors

- Peggy Flanagan, Lieutenant Governor of Minnesota (2019–present)

State Attorneys General

- Skip Humphrey, former Minnesota Attorney General

State Senators

- Scott Dibble, State Senator from Minneapolis (2003–present)
- Susan Kent, State Senator from Woodbury (2013–2023)
- Mary Kunesh, State Senator from New Brighton (2021–present)
- Ron Latz, State Senator from St. Louis Park (2007–present)
- Melisa López Franzen, State Senator from Edina (2013–2023)
- John Marty, State Senator from Roseville (1987–present)
- Jen McEwen, State Senator from Roseville (2021–present)
- Erin Murphy, State Senator from St. Paul (2021–present)
- Sandy Pappas, State Senator from St. Paul (1991–present)
- Lindsey Port, State Senator from Burnsville (2021–present)

State Representatives

- Kaela Berg, State Representative from Burnsville (2021–present)
- Liz Boldon, State Representative from Rochester (2021–present)
- Hunter Cantrell, former State Representative from Savage (2019–2021)
- Karen Clark, former State Representative from Minneapolis (1983–2013)
- Heather Edelson, State Representative from Edina (2019–present)
- Sandra Feist, State Representative from New Brighton (2021–present)
- Cedrick Frazier, State Representative from New Hope (2021–present)
- Mike Freiberg, State Representative from Golden Valley (2013–present)
- Aisha Gomez, State Representative from Minneapolis (2019–present)
- Jess Hanson, State Representative from Burnsville (2021–present)
- Kaohly Her, State Representative from St. Paul (2019–present)
- Athena Hollins, State Representative from St. Paul (2021–present)
- Larry Hosch, former State Representative from St. Joseph (2005–2013)
- Sydney Jordan, State Representative from Minneapolis (2020–present)
- Ginny Klevorn, State Representative from Plymouth (2019–present)
- Erin Koegel, State Representative from Spring Lake Park (2017–present)
- Tina Liebling, State Representative from Rochester (2005–present)
- Todd Lippert, State Representative from Northfield (2019–present)
- Jamie Long, State Representative from Minneapolis (2019–present)
- Carlos Mariani, State Representative from St. Paul (1991–present)
- Erin Maye Quade, former State Representative from Apple Valley (2017–2019)
- Carly Melin, former State Representative from Hibbing (2011–2017)
- Kelly Morrison, State Representative from Deephaven (2019–present)
- Liz Olson, State Representative from Duluth (2017–present)
- Dave Pinto, State Representative from St. Paul (2015–present)
- Joe Radinovich, former State Representative from Crosby (2013–2015)
- Jay Xiong, State Representative from St. Paul (2019–present)

County Attorneys

- Jim Austad, County Attorney of Lake of the Woods County
- James Backstrom, former County Attorney of Dakota County
- John Choi, County Attorney of Ramsey County
- Mike Freeman, County Attorney of Hennepin County
- Molly Hicken, County Attorney of Cook County
- Aaron Jordan, County Attorney of Stevens County
- Michael Junge, County Attorney of McLeod County
- Mark Ostrem, County Attorney of Olmsted County
- Tony Palumbo, County Attorney of Anoka County
- Mark Rubin, former County Attorney of St. Louis County
- Karin Sonneman, County Attorney of Winona County

County Commissioners

- Trista MatasCastillo, County Commissioner from Ramsey County

Mayors

- Melvin Carter, mayor of Saint Paul (2018–2026)
- Jacob Frey, mayor of Minneapolis (2018–present)
- Emily Larson, mayor of Duluth (2016–2024)

Other politicians

- Ken Martin, Chair of the Minnesota Democratic-Farmer-Labor Party (2011–present), Vice Chair of the Democratic National Committee (2021–present)

Organizations

- Black Economic Alliance
- Boundary Waters Action Fund
- Clean Water Action
- Color of Change
- Comunidades Organizando el Poder y la Acción Latina
- Democracy for America
- End Citizens United
- Everytown for Gun Safety
- Faith in Minnesota
- Human Rights Campaign
- Let America Vote
- Minnesota Democratic–Farmer–Labor Party
- MN350 Action
- Moms Demand Action
- Our Revolution
- OutFront Minnesota
- Planned Parenthood of Minnesota and North Dakota
- Pro-Choice Minnesota
- Protect MN
- Sierra Club
- TakeAction Minnesota

Labor unions

- IUPAT District Council 82
- Laborers District Council of Minnesota and North Dakota
- Minnesota AFL–CIO
- Minnesota AFSCME Council 5
- Minnesota Association of Professional Employees
- Minnesota Building Trades
- Minnesota IBEW
- Minnesota Inter Faculty Organization
- Minnesota Nurses Association
- Minnesota SEIU
- Minnesota State Council of the Communications Workers of America
- Minnesota State Council of Machinists
- North Central States Regional Council of Carpenters
- Teamsters Local 120
- Teamsters Local 320
- UNITE HERE Local 17

Others

- Jane Fonda, actress and activist
- Dave Winfield, former Major League Baseball player from Minnesota
Jim Schultz (R)

Organizations

- National Federation of Independent Business
- National Latino Peace Officer Association

Labor unions

- International Union of Operating Engineers Local 49
- Minnesota Police and Peace Officers Association
- National Troopers Coalition
- Ramsey County Deputies' Federation

Local officials

- Allen Anderson, Sheriff of Lac qui Parle County
- Ernest Beitel, Sheriff of Beltrami County
- Mitch Bernstein, Sheriff of Red Lake County
- Tom Burch, Sheriff of Cass County
- Michael Carr, Sheriff of Wadena County
- Brian Cruze, Sheriff of Meeker County
- Sean Deringer, Sheriff of Wright County
- Jason Dingman, Sheriff of Stevens County
- Mark Empting, Sheriff of Clay County
- Bill Flaten, Sheriff of Yellow Medicine County
- Bob Fletcher, Sheriff of Ramsey County
- Kurt Freitag, Sheriff of Freeborn County
- Todd Glander, Sheriff of Becker County
- Scott Goddard, Sheriff of Crow Wing County
- Josh Guenther, Sheriff of Mahnomen County
- Daniel Guida, Sheriff of Aitkin County
- Mark Haberer, Sheriff of Grant County
- Scott Hable, Sheriff of Renville County
- Troy Heck, Sheriff of Benton County
- Eric Holien, Sheriff of Kandiyohi County
- Tim Langenfeld, Sheriff of McLeod County
- Shawn Larsen, Sheriff of Morrison County
- Tim Leslie, Sheriff of Dakota County
- Brett Mason, Sheriff of Le Sueur County
- Brad Milbrath, Sheriff of Waseca County
- Jeffrey Nelson, Sheriff of Pine County
- Patrick Nienaber, Sheriff of Sibley County
- Scott Rose, Sheriff of Dodge County
- Steve Soyka, Sheriff of Stearns County
- Rich Stanek, former Sheriff of Hennepin County (2006–2018), former Minnesota Commissioner of Public Safety (2003-2004)
- Dan Starry, Sheriff of Washington County
- James Stuart, Sheriff of Anoka County
- James Tadman, Sheriff of Polk County
- Jeremy Thorton, Sheriff of Norman County
- Kevin Torgerson, Sheriff of Olmsted County
- Victor Williams, Sheriff of Itasca County
- Mark Wilwant, Sheriff of Kittson County

Newspapers

- Forum Communications Company newspapers (Forum newspapers share a single editorial board, which endorsed Schultz. The below papers published the endorsement.)
  - Alexandria Echo Press
  - Bemidji Pioneer
  - Brainerd Dispatch
  - Cloquet Pine Journal
  - Detroit Lakes Tribune
  - Duluth News Tribune
  - Forum of Fargo-Moorhead
  - Rochester Post-Bulletin
  - Wadena Pioneer Journal
  - West Central Tribune
  - Worthington Globe
Declined to endorse

Newspapers

- Star Tribune

=== Polling ===
Graphical summary

| Poll source | Date(s) administered | Sample size | Margin of error | Keith Ellison (DFL) | Jim Schultz (R) | Undecided |
|---|---|---|---|---|---|---|
| SurveyUSA (Note: This poll was sponsored by KSTP-TV) | Oct. 26 – 30, 2022 | 836 (LV) | ± 3.9% | 42% | 49% | 9% |
| St. Cloud State | Oct. 10 – 30, 2022 | 235 (A) | ± 8% | 52% | 40% | 8% |
| Trafalgar Group (R) (Note: This poll was sponsored by Alpha News) | Oct. 17 – 19, 2022 | 1,091 (LV) | ± 2.9% | 45.3% | 50.2% | 4.5% |
| Embold Research (Note: This poll was sponsored by MinnPost) | Oct. 10 – 14, 2022 | 1,585 (LV) | ± 2.6% | 46.6% | 47.1% | 6.3% (Note: "Not sure" with 5.3%, and "would not vote" with 1.0%) |
| SurveyUSA | Sep. 30 – Oct. 3, 2022 | 604 (LV) | ± 4.4% | 45% | 43% | 13% |
| Trafalgar Group (R) (Note: This poll was sponsored by Alpha News) | Sep. 14, 2022 | 1,079 (LV) | ± 2.9% | 45.7% | 49.3% | 4.9% |
| Mason-Dixon (Note: This poll was sponsored by the Star Tribune, MPR, and KARE) | Sep. 12 – 14, 2022 | 800 (LV) | ± 3.5% | 46.4% | 44.9% | 8.8% |
| SurveyUSA | Aug. 30 – Sep. 4, 2022 | 562 (LV) | ± 4.9% | 46% | 40% | 14% |
| Change Research | Jun. 3 – 8, 2022 | 1,551 (LV) | ± 2.6% | 44.2% | 44.9% | 10.9% (Note: "Not sure" with 8.6%, and "would not vote" with 2.4%) |

Hypothetical polling

Keith Ellison vs. Doug Wardlow

| Poll source | Date(s) administered | Sample size | Margin of error | Keith Ellison (DFL) | Doug Wardlow (R) | Undecided |
|---|---|---|---|---|---|---|
| Change Research | Jun. 3 – 8, 2022 | 1,551 (LV) | ± 2.6% | 44.3% | 43.9% | 11.8% (Note: "Not sure" with 8.9%, and "would not vote" with 2.9%) |

=== Results ===
2022 Minnesota Attorney General election
| Party | Candidate | Votes | % | ±% |
|---|---|---|---|---|
| Democratic (DFL) | Keith Ellison (incumbent) | 1,254,371 | 50.37% | +1.41% |
| Republican | Jim Schultz | 1,233,556 | 49.53% | +4.45% |
| Write-in | | 2,374 | 0.10% | -0.14% |
| Total votes | | 2,490,301 | 100.0% | N/A |
| Democratic (DFL) hold | | | | |

==== By county ====
| County | Keith Ellison DFL | | Jim Schultz GOP | | Write-in | | Margin | | Total votes |
| County | % | # | % | # | % | # | % | # | Total votes |
|---|---|---|---|---|---|---|---|---|---|
| Aitkin | 33.48% | 2,808 | 66.51% | 5,579 | 0.01% | 1 | -33.04% | -2,771 | 8,388 |
| Anoka | 44.98% | 69,825 | 54.93% | 85,278 | 0.09% | 146 | -9.95% | -15,453 | 155,249 |
| Becker | 32.31% | 4,738 | 67.64% | 9,917 | 0.05% | 7 | -35.32% | -5,179 | 14,662 |
| Beltrami | 44.72% | 8,048 | 55.15% | 9,924 | 0.13% | 24 | -10.42% | -1,876 | 17,996 |
| Benton | 31.01% | 5,045 | 68.88% | 11,205 | 0.11% | 18 | -37.87% | -6,160 | 16,268 |
| Big Stone | 34.25% | 825 | 65.67% | 1,582 | 0.08% | 2 | -31.42% | -757 | 2,409 |
| Blue Earth | 50.37% | 13,203 | 49.55% | 12,988 | 0.08% | 20 | 0.82% | 215 | 26,211 |
| Brown | 31.58% | 3,641 | 68.34% | 7,878 | 0.08% | 9 | -36.75% | -4,237 | 11,528 |
| Carlton | 48.53% | 7,670 | 51.35% | 8,116 | 0.13% | 20 | -2.82% | -446 | 15,806 |
| Carver | 42.35% | 22,774 | 57.58% | 30,962 | 0.06% | 34 | -15.23% | -8,188 | 53,770 |
| Cass | 32.12% | 4,871 | 67.82% | 10,285 | 0.06% | 9 | -35.70% | -5,414 | 15,165 |
| Chippewa | 32.97% | 1,620 | 67.01% | 3,292 | 0.02% | 1 | -34.03% | -1,672 | 4,913 |
| Chisago | 33.64% | 8,642 | 66.31% | 17,034 | 0.05% | 13 | -32.67% | -8,392 | 25,689 |
| Clay | 50.08% | 11,025 | 49.83% | 10,971 | 0.09% | 20 | 0.25% | 54 | 22,016 |
| Clearwater | 24.45% | 863 | 75.50% | 2,665 | 0.06% | 2 | -51.05% | -1,802 | 3,530 |
| Cook | 65.95% | 2,109 | 34.05% | 1,089 | 0.00% | 0 | 31.89% | 1,020 | 3,198 |
| Cottonwood | 29.12% | 1,336 | 70.84% | 3,250 | 0.04% | 2 | -41.72% | -1,914 | 4,588 |
| Crow Wing | 33.13% | 10,742 | 66.81% | 21,663 | 0.06% | 21 | -33.68% | -10,921 | 32,426 |
| Dakota | 52.80% | 105,095 | 47.10% | 93,750 | 0.10% | 206 | 5.70% | 11,345 | 199,051 |
| Dodge | 33.34% | 3,104 | 66.63% | 6,203 | 0.02% | 2 | -33.29% | -3,099 | 9,309 |
| Douglas | 31.19% | 6,103 | 68.75% | 13,453 | 0.06% | 12 | -37.56% | -7,350 | 19,568 |
| Faribault | 32.02% | 1,919 | 67.90% | 4,069 | 0.08% | 5 | -35.88% | -2,150 | 5,993 |
| Fillmore | 38.84% | 3,649 | 61.08% | 5,738 | 0.09% | 8 | -22.24% | -2,089 | 9,395 |
| Freeborn | 39.90% | 5,164 | 60.07% | 7,774 | 0.03% | 4 | -20.17% | -2,610 | 12,942 |
| Goodhue | 40.92% | 9,384 | 58.98% | 13,525 | 0.10% | 22 | -18.06% | -4,141 | 22,931 |
| Grant | 35.63% | 1,044 | 64.23% | 1,882 | 0.14% | 4 | -28.60% | -838 | 2,930 |
| Hennepin | 68.09% | 388,811 | 31.79% | 181,512 | 0.12% | 683 | 36.30% | 207,299 | 571,006 |
| Houston | 41.21% | 3,568 | 58.78% | 5,089 | 0.01% | 1 | -17.57% | -1,521 | 8,658 |
| Hubbard | 33.51% | 3,556 | 66.40% | 7,046 | 0.09% | 10 | -32.89% | -3,490 | 10,612 |
| Isanti | 29.60% | 5,554 | 70.33% | 13,197 | 0.07% | 14 | -40.73% | -7,643 | 18,765 |
| Itasca | 40.48% | 8,586 | 59.45% | 12,610 | 0.07% | 14 | -18.97% | -4,024 | 21,210 |
| Jackson | 28.89% | 1,306 | 71.06% | 3,212 | 0.04% | 2 | -42.17% | -1,906 | 4,520 |
| Kanabec | 30.77% | 2,190 | 69.19% | 4,924 | 0.04% | 3 | -38.42% | -2,734 | 7,117 |
| Kandiyohi | 34.13% | 6,186 | 65.84% | 11,935 | 0.03% | 6 | -31.72% | -5,749 | 18,127 |
| Kittson | 36.22% | 681 | 63.67% | 1,197 | 0.11% | 2 | -27.45% | -516 | 1,880 |
| Koochiching | 37.24% | 1,937 | 62.72% | 3,262 | 0.04% | 2 | -25.48% | -1,325 | 5,201 |
| Lac qui Parle | 34.97% | 1,091 | 65.00% | 2,028 | 0.03% | 1 | -30.03% | -937 | 3,120 |
| Lake | 50.97% | 2,870 | 48.93% | 2,755 | 0.11% | 6 | 2.04% | 115 | 5,631 |
| Lake of the Woods | 24.35% | 439 | 75.54% | 1,362 | 0.11% | 2 | -51.19% | -923 | 1,803 |
| Le Sueur | 32.68% | 4,287 | 67.24% | 8,820 | 0.08% | 10 | -34.56% | -4,533 | 13,117 |
| Lincoln | 31.14% | 752 | 68.74% | 1,660 | 0.12% | 3 | -37.60% | -908 | 2,415 |
| Lyon | 33.18% | 3,231 | 66.76% | 6,501 | 0.06% | 6 | -33.58% | -3,270 | 9,738 |
| Mahnomen | 40.75% | 661 | 59.19% | 960 | 0.06% | 1 | -18.43% | -299 | 1,622 |
| Marshall | 25.16% | 1,004 | 74.77% | 2,984 | 0.08% | 3 | -49.61% | -1,980 | 3,991 |
| Martin | 29.17% | 2,425 | 70.82% | 5,888 | 0.01% | 1 | -41.65% | -3,463 | 8,314 |
| McLeod | 29.78% | 4,871 | 70.15% | 11,475 | 0.07% | 11 | -40.37% | -6,604 | 16,357 |
| Meeker | 28.06% | 3,020 | 71.82% | 7,729 | 0.11% | 12 | -43.76% | -4,709 | 10,761 |
| Mille Lacs | 29.96% | 3,305 | 69.91% | 7,711 | 0.13% | 14 | -39.95% | -4,406 | 11,030 |
| Morrison | 22.00% | 3,377 | 77.96% | 11,968 | 0.04% | 6 | -55.96% | -8,591 | 15,351 |
| Mower | 46.37% | 6,490 | 53.58% | 7,499 | 0.04% | 6 | -7.21% | -1,009 | 13,995 |
| Murray | 28.35% | 1,097 | 71.55% | 2,769 | 0.10% | 4 | -43.20% | -1,672 | 3,870 |
| Nicollet | 50.01% | 7,582 | 49.87% | 7,562 | 0.12% | 18 | 0.13% | 20 | 15,162 |
| Nobles | 31.15% | 1,874 | 68.74% | 4,136 | 0.12% | 7 | -37.59% | -2,262 | 6,017 |
| Norman | 39.82% | 980 | 60.06% | 1,478 | 0.12% | 3 | -20.24% | -498 | 2,461 |
| Olmsted | 53.27% | 35,986 | 46.69% | 31,540 | 0.04% | 29 | 6.58% | 4,446 | 67,555 |
| Otter Tail | 30.87% | 8,744 | 69.04% | 19,557 | 0.10% | 28 | -38.17% | -10,813 | 28,329 |
| Pennington | 33.51% | 1,807 | 66.44% | 3,583 | 0.06% | 3 | -32.93% | -1,776 | 5,393 |
| Pine | 33.26% | 4,103 | 66.64% | 8,220 | 0.10% | 12 | -33.38% | -4,117 | 12,335 |
| Pipestone | 24.04% | 900 | 75.88% | 2,841 | 0.08% | 3 | -51.84% | -1,941 | 3,744 |
| Polk | 31.09% | 3,357 | 68.86% | 7,436 | 0.05% | 5 | -37.78% | -4,079 | 10,798 |
| Pope | 34.39% | 1,940 | 65.54% | 3,697 | 0.07% | 4 | -31.15% | -1,757 | 5,641 |
| Ramsey | 70.11% | 150,907 | 29.74% | 64,014 | 0.15% | 320 | 40.37% | 86,893 | 215,241 |
| Red Lake | 31.33% | 489 | 68.55% | 1,070 | 0.13% | 2 | -37.22% | -581 | 1,561 |
| Redwood | 26.14% | 1,673 | 73.79% | 4,722 | 0.06% | 4 | -47.65% | -3,049 | 6,399 |
| Renville | 29.55% | 1,847 | 70.42% | 4,402 | 0.03% | 2 | -40.87% | -2,555 | 6,251 |
| Rice | 48.97% | 13,817 | 50.96% | 14,377 | 0.07% | 19 | -1.98% | -560 | 28,213 |
| Rock | 27.86% | 1,141 | 72.06% | 2,951 | 0.07% | 3 | -44.20% | -1,810 | 4,095 |
| Roseau | 23.52% | 1,514 | 76.48% | 4,922 | 0.00% | 0 | -52.95% | -3,408 | 6,436 |
| Scott | 42.24% | 28,455 | 57.67% | 38,853 | 0.09% | 62 | -15.43% | -10,398 | 67,370 |
| Sherburne | 31.19% | 12,898 | 68.76% | 28,430 | 0.05% | 20 | -37.56% | -15,532 | 41,348 |
| Sibley | 27.45% | 1,798 | 72.52% | 4,751 | 0.03% | 2 | -45.08% | -2,953 | 6,551 |
| St. Louis | 56.83% | 52,488 | 43.03% | 39,740 | 0.14% | 128 | 13.80% | 12,748 | 92,356 |
| Stearns | 35.68% | 23,247 | 64.24% | 41,857 | 0.08% | 53 | -28.56% | -18,610 | 65,157 |
| Steele | 37.29% | 6,114 | 62.67% | 10,275 | 0.04% | 6 | -25.38% | -4,161 | 16,395 |
| Stevens | 36.52% | 1,460 | 63.41% | 2,535 | 0.08% | 3 | -26.89% | -1,075 | 3,998 |
| Swift | 34.61% | 1,342 | 65.28% | 2,531 | 0.10% | 4 | -30.67% | -1,189 | 3,877 |
| Todd | 24.22% | 2,617 | 75.70% | 8,178 | 0.07% | 8 | -51.48% | -5,561 | 10,803 |
| Traverse | 33.03% | 507 | 66.78% | 1,025 | 0.20% | 3 | -33.75% | -518 | 1,535 |
| Wabasha | 35.76% | 3,804 | 64.20% | 6,830 | 0.04% | 4 | -28.45% | -3,026 | 10,638 |
| Wadena | 25.12% | 1,492 | 74.83% | 4,444 | 0.05% | 3 | -49.71% | -2,952 | 5,939 |
| Waseca | 32.71% | 2,716 | 67.23% | 5,582 | 0.06% | 5 | -34.52% | -2,866 | 8,303 |
| Washington | 50.70% | 65,723 | 49.23% | 63,810 | 0.07% | 95 | 1.48% | 1,913 | 129,628 |
| Watonwan | 35.93% | 1,382 | 63.99% | 2,461 | 0.08% | 3 | -28.06% | -1,079 | 3,846 |
| Wilkin | 28.04% | 714 | 71.84% | 1,829 | 0.12% | 3 | -43.79% | -1,115 | 2,546 |
| Winona | 47.89% | 9,704 | 52.03% | 10,543 | 0.08% | 16 | -4.14% | -839 | 20,263 |
| Wright | 32.60% | 21,397 | 67.31% | 44,184 | 0.09% | 59 | -34.72% | -22,787 | 65,640 |
| Yellow Medicine | 30.22% | 1,310 | 69.78% | 3,025 | 0.00% | 0 | -39.56% | -1,715 | 4,335 |
| Totals | 50.37% | 1,254,371 | 49.53% | 1,233,556 | 0.10% | 2,374 | 0.84% | 20,815 | 2,490,301 |

Counties that flipped from Democratic to Republican

- Carlton (largest municipality: Cloquet)
- Mahnomen (largest city: Mahnomen)
- Norman (largest city: Ada)
- Rice (largest city: Faribault)
- Winona (largest city: Winona)

Counties that flipped from Republican to Democratic

- Olmsted (largest city: Rochester)
- Washington (largest city: Stillwater)

==== By congressional district ====
Despite losing the state, Schultz won five of eight congressional districts, including one that elected a Democrat.

| District | Ellison | Schultz | Representative |
|---|---|---|---|
| 1st | 43% | 57% | Brad Finstad |
| 2nd | 49.7% | 50.2% | Angie Craig |
| 3rd | 56% | 44% | Dean Phillips |
| 4th | 66% | 34% | Betty McCollum |
| 5th | 80% | 20% | Ilhan Omar |
| 6th | 38% | 62% | Tom Emmer |
| 7th | 31% | 69% | Michelle Fischbach |
| 8th | 42% | 57% | Pete Stauber |

== See also ==
- 2022 Minnesota elections
