= 2020 United States Senate election in Minnesota =

- November 3, 2020
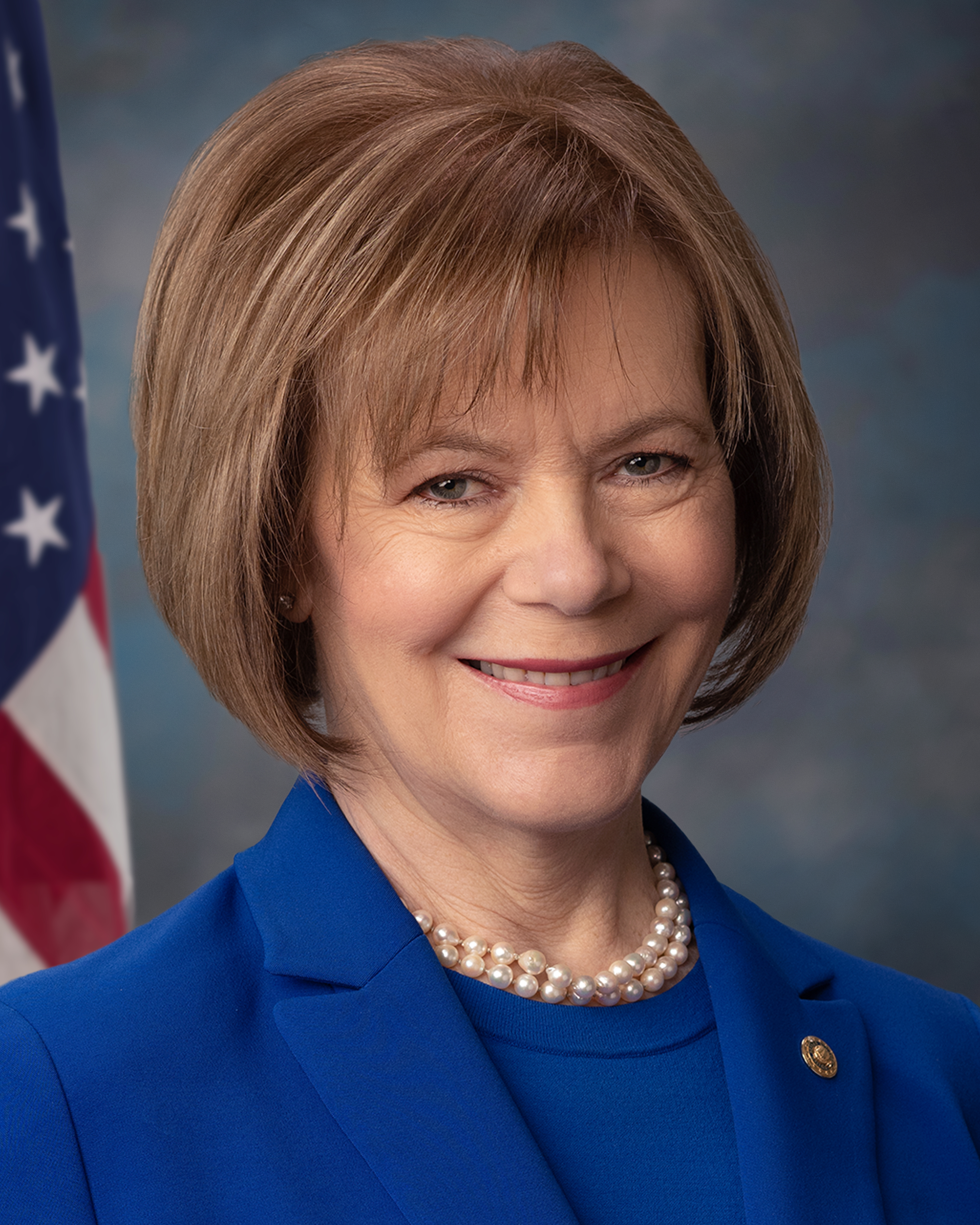

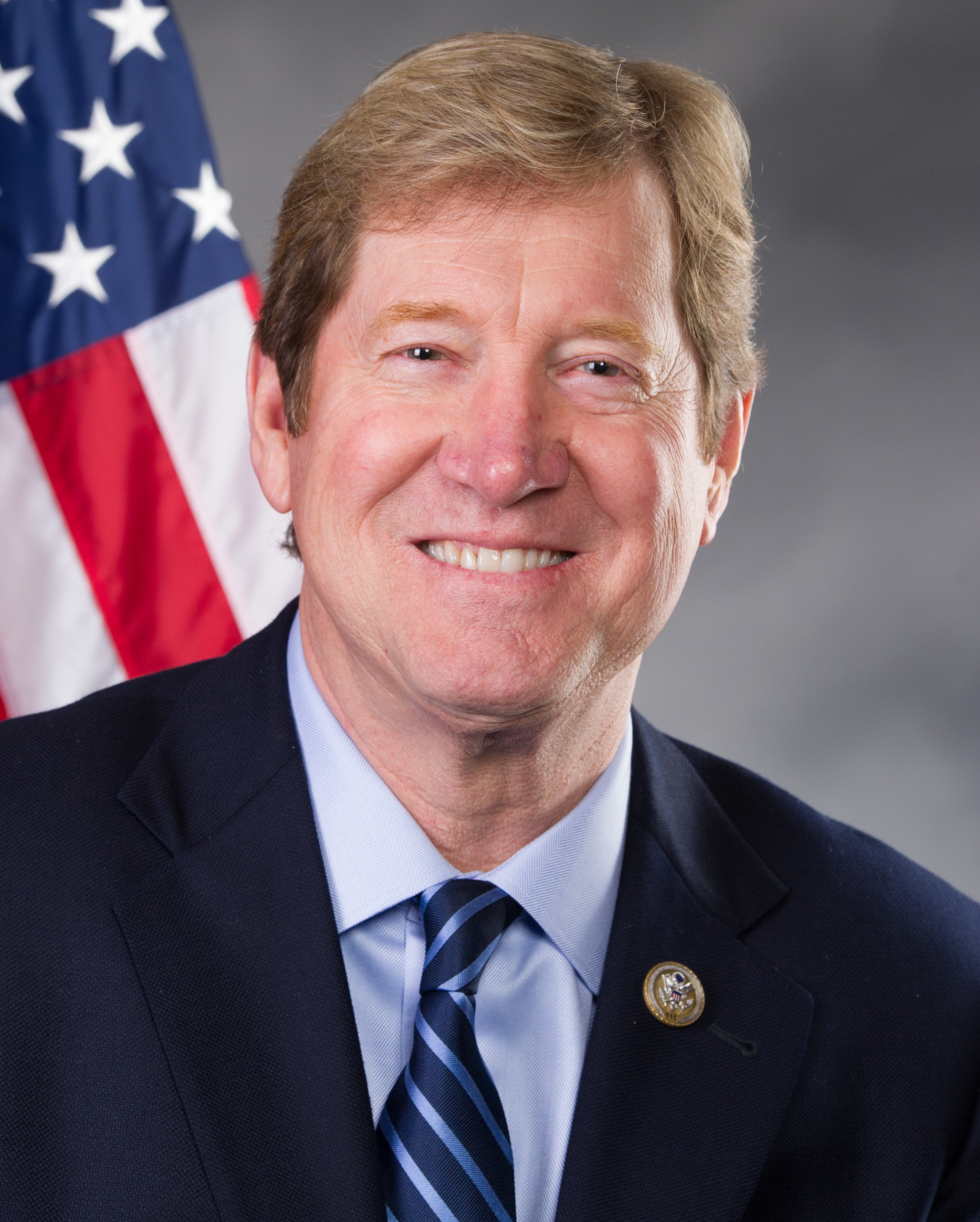

Nominee	Tina Smith	Jason Lewis	Kevin O'Connor
Party	Democratic (DFL)	Republican	Legal Marijuana Now
Popular vote	1,566,522	1,398,145	190,154
Percentage	48.74%	43.50%	5.91%
- Smith: 30–40% 40–50% 50–60% 60–70% 70–80% 80–90% >90% Lewis: 40–50% 50–60% 60–70% 70–80% 80–90% >90% Tie: 40–50% 50% No votes
U.S. senator before election
Tina Smith
Democratic (DFL)
Elected U.S. Senator
Tina Smith
Democratic (DFL)

The 2020 United States Senate election in Minnesota was held on November 3, 2020, to elect a member of the United States Senate to represent the state of Minnesota, concurrently with the 2020 U.S. presidential election, as well as other elections to the U.S. Senate, elections to the United States House of Representatives, and other state and local elections. Some Republican pundits and strategists believed Minnesota to be a potential pickup opportunity due to its perceived increasingly favorable demographics and unexpectedly close result in the 2016 presidential election, along with potential backlash from the 2020 George Floyd protests, originating after the murder of George Floyd in Minneapolis. However, every poll showed incumbent Democratic Senator Tina Smith in the lead by varying degrees.

Smith was reelected to a full term in office by a margin of 5.2 points, making this the closest Senate election in Minnesota since 2008. The primary took place on August 11.

== Democratic primary ==
=== Candidates ===
==== Nominee ====
- Tina Smith, incumbent U.S. senator

==== Eliminated in primary ====
- Steve Carlson, candidate for U.S. Senate in 2018 and write-in candidate for president in 2016
- Ahmad Hassan
- Paula Overby, Green Party nominee for U.S. Senate in 2018
- Christopher Seymore Sr.

==== Withdrawn ====
- W. D. "Bill" Hamm
- Alexandra Marie Holker

=== Endorsements ===
Tina Smith

U.S. senators

- Amy Klobuchar, U.S. senator from Minnesota; former 2020 presidential candidate

Organizations

- Brady Campaign
- Council for a Livable World
- EMILY's List
- End Citizens United
- Everytown for Gun Safety
- Feminist Majority PAC
- Giffords
- Human Rights Campaign
- J Street PAC
- Joint Action Committee for Political Affairs
- League of Conservation Voters
- NARAL Pro-Choice America
- National Committee to Preserve Social Security and Medicare
- National Organization for Women
- Planned Parenthood Action Fund
- Population Connection
- Stonewall DFL
- Women Winning
- Women's Political Committee

Labor unions

- Education Minnesota
- Minnesota State AFL–CIO

=== Results ===
Results by county: Map legend: Smith—>90%; Smith—80–90%; Smith—70–80%

Democratic primary results
Party	Candidate	Votes	%
Democratic (DFL)	Tina Smith (incumbent)	497,498	87.14%
Democratic (DFL)	Paula Overby	30,497	5.34%
Democratic (DFL)	Ahmad Hassan	20,037	3.51%
Democratic (DFL)	Steve Carlson	16,429	2.88%
Democratic (DFL)	Christopher Seymore	6,480	1.13%
Total votes		570,941	100.00%

== Republican primary ==
=== Candidates ===
==== Nominee ====
- Jason Lewis, former U.S. representative for Minnesota's 2nd congressional district

==== Eliminated in primary ====
- John L. Berman
- Bob Carney Jr.
- Cynthia Gail, art teacher
- James Reibestein

==== Withdrawn ====
- Rob Barrett Jr., assistant professor at North Central University
- Christopher Chamberlin, candidate for governor, U.S. senator, and U.S. representative in 2018 and Libertarian activist
- Forest Hyatt, Republican candidate for the 2018 United States Senate special election in Minnesota
- Theron Preston Washington

==== Declined ====
- Donna Bergstrom, nominee for lieutenant governor of Minnesota in 2018
- Kurt Daudt, minority leader of the Minnesota House of Representatives
- Bill Guidera, attorney and former 21st Century Fox executive
- Karin Housley, state senator and Republican nominee for U.S. Senate in 2018
- Mike Lindell, CEO of My Pillow
- Doug Wardlow, former state representative and Republican nominee for attorney general of Minnesota in 2018

=== Endorsements ===
Jason Lewis

U.S. president

- Donald Trump, 45th president of the United States

Political organizations

- Republican Party of Minnesota

=== Results ===
Results by county: Map legend: Lewis—80–90%; Lewis—70–80%; Lewis—60–70%; Lewis—50–60%

Republican primary results
Party	Candidate	Votes	%
Republican	Jason Lewis	191,290	78.11%
Republican	Cynthia Gail	17,675	7.22%
Republican	John Berman	16,213	6.62%
Republican	Bob Carney Jr.	10,503	4.29%
Republican	James Reibestein	9,210	3.76%
Total votes		244,891	100.00%

== Other candidates ==
=== Grassroots–Legalize Cannabis ===
==== Nominee ====
- Oliver Steinberg

==== Results ====
Grassroots–Legalize Cannabis primary results
Party	Candidate	Votes	%
Grassroots—LC	Oliver Steinberg	3,275	100.00%
Total votes		3,275	100.00%

=== Legal Marijuana Now ===
==== Nominee ====
- Kevin O'Connor

=== Primary results ===
County results for Kevin O'Connor: Map legend: 8%; 7%; 6%; 5%; 4%; 3%

Legal Marijuana Now primary results
Party	Candidate	Votes	%
Legal Marijuana Now	Kevin O'Connor	6,996	100.00%
Total votes		6,996	100.00%

=== Independent write-in candidate ===
==== Declared ====
- George Dennis Jr.
- Josh D. Ondich, perennial candidate

== General election ==
=== Debate ===
Two general election debates were held. The first, on October 2, 2020, was hosted by Minnesota Public Radio and was attended by Smith and Lewis. The second debate was hosted by Twin Cities PBS on October 23, 2020, and was attended only by Lewis.

=== Predictions ===
Source	Ranking	As of
The Cook Political Report	Safe D	October 29, 2020
Inside Elections	Safe D	October 28, 2020
Sabato's Crystal Ball	Likely D	November 2, 2020
Daily Kos	Likely D	October 30, 2020
Politico	Likely D	November 2, 2020
RCP	Tossup	October 23, 2020
DDHQ	Likely D	November 3, 2020
538	Safe D	November 2, 2020
Economist	Likely D	November 2, 2020

=== Additional general election endorsements ===
Tina Smith (DFL)

U.S. senators

- Kirsten Gillibrand, U.S. senator from New York; former 2020 presidential candidate
- Elizabeth Warren, U.S. senator from Massachusetts; former 2020 presidential candidate

Organizations

- Natural Resources Defense Council Action Fund
- Rachel's Action Network

Labor unions

- American Federation of State, County and Municipal Employees Council 5
- National Education Association
- Service Employees International Union Minnesota State Council
- United Auto Workers

Newspapers

- Minneapolis Star Tribune
Jason Lewis (R)

U.S. executive branch officials

- Mike Pence, 48th vice president of the United States

U.S. representatives

- Jim Hagedorn, congressman for Minnesota's 1st congressional district

Other individuals

- Mike Lindell, CEO of My Pillow Inc. and campaign chair for Trump's reelection campaign in Minnesota

Organizations

- Minnesota Fraternal Order of Police
- Minnesota Police and Peace Officers Association
- National Federation of Independent Business
- United States Chamber of Commerce

Newspapers

- Alexandria Echo Press
- Bemidji Pioneer
- Brainerd Dispatch
- Detroit Lakes Tribune
- Duluth News Tribune
- Park Rapids Enterprise
- Red Wing Republican Eagle
- Rochester Post-Bulletin
- Wadena Pioneer Journal
- West Central Tribune
- Worthington Daily Globe

=== Polling ===
View source data.

Poll source	Date(s) administered	Sample size	Margin of error	Tina Smith (DFL)	Jason Lewis (R)	Other	Undecided
Research Co.	October 31 – November 1, 2020	450 (LV)	4.6%	50%	39%	2% (Note: "Someone else" with 2%)	9%
Data for Progress	October 27 – November 1, 2020	1,259 (LV)	± 2.8%	54%	44%	2% (Note: "Other candidate or write-in" with 2%)	–
Swayable	October 23 – November 1, 2020	430 (LV)	± 6.1%	55%	46%	–	–
Public Policy Polling	October 29–30, 2020	770 (V)	–	51%	42%	–	6%
Targoz Market Research/PollSmart	October 25–30, 2020	1,138 (LV)	–	53%	44%	3% (Note: "Not sure/Someone else/Undecided" with 3%)	–
St. Cloud State University	October 10–29, 2020	372 (A)	± 6.7%	53%	36%	–	–
SurveyUSA	October 23–27, 2020	649 (LV)	± 4.3%	45%	42%	3% (Note: "Some other candidate" with 3%)	10%
Gravis Marketing	October 24–26, 2020	657 (LV)	± 3.8%	53%	39%	–	8%
Civiqs/Daily Kos	October 17–20, 2020	840 (LV)	± 3.6%	54%	43%	2% (Note: O'Connor (LMN) and Steinberg (GLC) with 1%; "Someone else" with 0%)	1%
SurveyUSA	October 16–20, 2020	625 (LV)	± 5%	43%	42%	3%	12%
Change Research	October 12–15, 2020 (Note: Additional data sourced from FiveThirtyEight)	1,021 (LV)	± 3.1%	48%	44%	4% (Note: O'Connor (LMN) with 3%; Steinberg (GLC) with 1%; would not vote with 0%)	5%
SurveyUSA	October 1–6, 2020	929 (LV)	± 3.9%	44%	37%	4% (Note: "Some other candidate" with 4%)	16%
Suffolk University	September 20–24, 2020	500 (LV)	± 4.4%	45%	35%	6% (Note: O'Connor (LMN) and "Refused" with 2%; Steinberg (GLC) and "Other" with 1%)	14%
Mason-Dixon Polling & Strategy	September 21–23, 2020	800 (LV)	± 3.5%	49%	41%	–	10%
Redfield & Wilton Strategies	September 12–17, 2020	718 (LV)	± 3.7%	51%	36%	2% (Note: "Another Third Party/Write-in" with 2%)	11%
CBS News/YouGov	September 9–11, 2020	1,087 (LV)	± 3.9%	47%	40%	2%	10%
Siena College/NYT Upshot	September 8–10, 2020	814 (LV)	± 3.9%	49%	40%	0% (Note: "Someone else" and would not vote with 0%)	11% (Note: Includes "Refused")
SurveyUSA	September 4–7, 2020	553 (LV)	± 5.2%	47%	36%	3%	14%
Public Policy Polling	September 3–4, 2020	877 (V)	± 3.3%	49%	41%	3% (Note: "Someone else" with 3%)	7%
Harper Polling (R) (Note: Poll sponsored by Lewis' campaign)	August 30 – September 1, 2020	501 (LV)	± 4.4%	43%	41%	–	10%
Emerson College	August 8–10, 2020	733 (LV)	± 3.6%	48%	45%	–	7%
Public Policy Polling (D) (Note: Giffords endorsed Tina Smith prior to the sampling period)	July 22–23, 2020	1,218 (V)	± 3.2%	48%	39%	–	13%
Harper Polling (R)	May 26–28, 2020	510 (LV)	–	46%	35%	–	20%

Hypothetical polling

with Generic Democrat and Generic Republican

Poll source	Date(s) administered	Sample size	Margin of error	Generic Democrat	Generic Republican	Other	Undecided
PPP	Sep 3–4, 2020	877 (V)	± 3.3%	51%	44%	–	4%
Harper Polling/Jason Lewis	Aug 30 – Sep 1, 2020	501 (LV)	± 4.38%	45%	43%	3%	9%
Emerson College	Aug 8–10, 2020	733 (LV)	± 3.6%	48%	46%	–	7%
Harper Polling (R)	May 26–28, 2020	510 (LV)	–	44%	40%	–	–

=== Results ===
2020 United States Senate election in Minnesota
Party	Candidate	Votes	%	±%
Democratic (DFL)	Tina Smith (incumbent)	1,566,522	48.74%	−4.23%
Republican	Jason Lewis	1,398,145	43.50%	+1.15%
Legal Marijuana Now	Kevin O'Connor	190,154	5.91%	+2.21%
Grassroots—LC	Oliver Steinberg	57,174	1.78%	N/A
Write-in		2,261	0.07%	+0.03%
Total votes		3,214,256	100.00%	N/A
Democratic (DFL) hold				

==== By county ====
By county

County	Tina Smith DFL		Jason Lewis Republican		Kevin O'Connor LMN		Oliver Steinberg G–LC		Write-in		Margin		Total votes
County	#	%	#	%	#	%	#	%	#	%			Total votes
Aitkin	3,474	35.29	5,761	58.52	462	4.69	143	1.45	5	0.05	-2,287	-23.23	9,845
Anoka	89,416	43.24	98,043	47.41	15,385	7.44	3,842	1.86	118	0.06	-8,627	-4.17	206,804
Becker	6,370	33.49	11,274	59.28	1,069	5.62	297	1.56	9	0.05	-4,904	-25.78	19,019
Beltrami	9,987	41.88	11,468	48.09	1,804	7.57	564	2.37	22	0.09	-1,481	-6.21	23,845
Benton	6,835	31.39	12,915	59.32	1,539	7.07	465	2.14	17	0.08	-6,080	-27.93	21,771
Big Stone	1,106	37.52	1,637	55.53	163	5.53	39	1.32	3	0.10	-531	-18.01	2,948
Blue Earth	16,527	46.78	15,040	42.57	2,847	8.06	871	2.47	41	0.12	1,487	4.21	35,326
Brown	4,808	33.23	8,736	60.38	690	4.77	224	1.55	10	0.07	-3,928	-27.15	14,468
Carlton	9,577	48.01	8,906	44.65	1,092	5.47	361	1.81	11	0.06	671	3.36	19,947
Carver	27,616	42.16	33,623	51.33	3,292	5.03	928	1.42	38	0.06	-6,007	-9.17	65,497
Cass	5,913	32.66	10,877	60.08	966	5.33	333	1.84	16	0.09	-4,964	-27.42	18,105
Chippewa	2,270	34.77	3,807	58.32	358	5.48	90	1.38	3	0.05	-1,537	-23.54	6,528
Chisago	11,014	32.62	19,700	58.34	2,340	6.93	692	2.05	20	0.06	-8,686	-25.72	33,766
Clay	15,136	47.99	13,308	42.20	2,348	7.45	716	2.27	29	0.09	1,828	5.80	31,537
Clearwater	1,224	26.50	3,078	66.65	242	5.24	69	1.49	5	0.11	-1,854	-40.15	4,618
Cook	2,344	63.08	1,162	31.27	133	3.58	73	1.96	4	0.11	1,182	31.81	3,716
Cottonwood	1,794	29.94	3,796	63.35	321	5.36	80	1.33	1	0.02	-2,002	-33.41	5,992
Crow Wing	12,964	32.76	23,792	60.11	2,032	5.13	774	1.96	16	0.04	-10,828	-27.36	39,578
Dakota	131,394	50.89	107,117	41.49	15,318	5.93	4,162	1.61	196	0.08	24,277	9.40	258,187
Dodge	4,013	33.45	6,924	57.71	806	6.72	248	2.07	6	0.05	-2,911	-24.26	11,997
Douglas	7,617	32.03	14,775	62.13	1,055	4.44	321	1.35	14	0.06	-7,158	-30.10	23,782
Faribault	2,531	32.66	4,624	59.66	444	5.73	148	1.91	3	0.04	-2,093	-27.01	7,750
Fillmore	4,696	39.22	6,440	53.79	625	5.22	205	1.71	6	0.05	-1,744	-14.57	11,972
Freeborn	6,797	41.09	8,364	50.57	1,057	6.39	313	1.89	10	0.06	-1,567	-9.47	16,541
Goodhue	11,186	39.45	15,171	53.50	1,486	5.24	489	1.72	25	0.09	-3,985	-14.05	28,357
Grant	1,349	37.51	2,044	56.84	163	4.53	39	1.08	1	0.03	-695	-19.33	3,596
Hennepin	478,129	64.46	209,754	28.28	41,282	5.56	12,130	1.63	496	0.07	268,375	36.18	741,791
Houston	4,478	39.96	5,778	51.56	700	6.25	243	2.17	8	0.07	-1,300	-11.60	11,207
Hubbard	4,281	33.43	7,713	60.23	572	4.47	232	1.81	7	0.06	-3,432	-26.80	12,805
Isanti	6,751	28.34	14,774	62.01	1,671	7.01	608	2.55	20	0.08	-8,023	-33.68	23,824
Itasca	10,463	39.88	13,949	53.17	1,353	5.16	458	1.74	14	0.05	-3,486	-13.29	26,237
Jackson	1,744	30.55	3,524	61.74	323	5.66	115	2.01	2	0.04	-1,780	-31.18	5,708
Kanabec	2,612	28.91	5,657	62.62	577	6.39	185	2.05	3	0.03	-3,045	-33.71	9,034
Kandiyohi	8,117	35.32	13,388	58.25	1,151	5.01	312	1.36	16	0.07	-5,271	-22.93	22,984
Kittson	1,116	42.97	1,350	51.98	98	3.77	32	1.23	1	0.04	-234	-9.01	2,597
Koochiching	2,637	39.08	3,629	53.78	365	5.41	114	1.69	3	0.04	-992	-14.70	6,748
Lac qui Parle	1,477	37.08	2,314	58.10	139	3.49	52	1.31	1	0.02	-837	-21.01	3,983
Lake	3,485	48.95	3,155	44.31	332	4.66	144	2.02	4	0.06	330	4.64	7,120
Lake of the Woods	650	27.61	1,545	65.63	121	5.14	37	1.57	1	0.04	-895	-38.02	2,354
Le Sueur	5,401	32.74	9,825	59.56	969	5.87	297	1.80	5	0.03	-4,424	-26.82	16,497
Lincoln	911	29.55	1,936	62.80	183	5.94	49	1.59	4	0.13	-1,025	-33.25	3,083
Lyon	4,464	35.03	7,401	58.08	668	5.24	195	1.53	14	0.11	-2,937	-23.05	12,742
Mahnomen	1,039	45.85	1,007	44.44	169	7.46	48	2.12	3	0.13	32	1.41	2,266
Marshall	1,490	29.73	3,255	64.96	198	3.95	62	1.24	6	0.12	-1,765	-35.22	5,011
Martin	3,348	30.79	6,707	61.68	613	5.64	200	1.84	6	0.05	-3,359	-30.89	10,874
McLeod	6,114	29.64	12,875	62.43	1,223	5.93	393	1.91	19	0.09	-6,761	-32.78	20,624
Meeker	3,889	29.12	8,575	64.20	664	4.97	221	1.65	7	0.05	-4,686	-35.08	13,356
Mille Lacs	4,123	28.74	8,851	61.69	1,025	7.14	334	2.33	15	0.10	-4,728	-32.95	14,348
Morrison	4,452	23.25	13,368	69.82	1,012	5.29	307	1.60	7	0.04	-8,916	-46.57	19,146
Mower	8,472	44.92	8,615	45.68	1,380	7.32	385	2.04	7	0.04	-143	-0.76	18,859
Murray	1,448	30.15	3,081	64.15	221	4.60	52	1.08	1	0.02	-1,633	-34.00	4,803
Nicollet	8,992	47.64	8,397	44.48	1,062	5.63	412	2.18	13	0.07	595	3.15	18,876
Nobles	2,776	32.87	4,959	58.72	543	6.43	162	1.92	5	0.06	-2,183	-25.85	8,445
Norman	1,497	44.59	1,617	48.17	193	5.75	48	1.43	2	0.06	-120	-3.57	3,357
Olmsted	45,543	51.22	36,972	41.58	4,730	5.32	1,604	1.80	60	0.07	8,571	9.64	88,909
Otter Tail	11,728	32.75	21,738	60.70	1,817	5.07	510	1.42	19	0.05	-10,010	-27.95	35,812
Pennington	2,574	35.76	3,919	54.45	566	7.86	133	1.85	5	0.07	-1,345	-18.69	7,197
Pine	5,055	32.16	9,341	59.44	1,005	6.39	310	1.97	5	0.03	-4,286	-27.27	15,716
Pipestone	1,200	24.68	3,324	68.37	264	5.43	71	1.46	3	0.06	-2,124	-43.69	4,862
Polk	5,577	36.45	8,559	55.94	917	5.99	236	1.54	10	0.06	-2,982	-19.49	15,299
Pope	2,390	34.66	4,135	59.96	290	4.20	77	1.12	4	0.06	-1,745	-25.30	6,896
Ramsey	188,784	65.55	73,638	25.57	19,087	6.63	6,158	2.14	324	0.11	115,146	39.98	287,991
Red Lake	769	35.92	1,222	57.08	114	5.32	33	1.54	3	1.40	-453	-21.16	2,141
Redwood	2,297	28.06	5,415	66.15	355	4.34	114	1.39	5	0.06	-3,118	-38.09	8,186
Renville	2,500	31.47	4,927	62.01	390	4.91	122	1.54	6	0.07	-2,427	-30.55	7,945
Rice	16,201	46.20	15,999	45.63	2,138	6.10	701	2.00	24	0.07	202	0.58	35,063
Rock	1,461	28.42	3,286	63.93	294	5.72	98	1.91	1	0.02	-1,825	-35.51	5,140
Roseau	2,321	27.93	5,494	66.11	396	4.76	95	1.14	4	0.05	-3,173	-38.18	8,310
Scott	35,758	41.34	44,215	51.11	5,218	6.03	1,269	1.47	46	0.05	-8,457	-9.78	86,506
Sherburne	16,584	30.46	33,145	60.88	3,702	6.80	974	1.79	42	0.08	-16,561	-30.42	54,447
Sibley	2,368	28.52	5,391	64.94	426	5.13	112	1.35	5	0.06	-3,023	-36.41	8,302
St. Louis	63,036	53.81	45,016	38.43	6,545	5.59	2,451	2.09	87	0.07	18,020	15.38	117,135
Stearns	29,931	35.89	47,080	56.45	4,843	5.81	1,484	1.78	64	0.08	-17,149	-20.56	83,402
Steele	7,412	36.00	11,358	55.16	1,381	6.71	435	2.11	5	0.02	-3,946	-19.16	20,591
Stevens	1,906	38.02	2,848	56.81	192	3.83	67	1.34	0	0.00	-942	-18.79	5,013
Swift	1,838	35.70	3,020	58.66	226	4.39	63	1.22	1	0.02	-1,182	-22.96	5,148
Todd	3,354	25.68	8,842	67.70	650	4.98	205	1.57	10	0.08	-5,488	-42.02	13,061
Traverse	656	35.87	1,045	57.13	98	5.36	27	1.48	3	0.16	-389	-21.27	1,829
Wabasha	4,513	35.02	7,535	58.47	643	4.99	190	1.47	5	0.04	-3,022	-23.45	12,886
Wadena	1,977	26.09	5,041	66.52	419	5.53	137	1.81	4	0.05	-3,064	-40.43	7,578
Waseca	3,365	32.95	6,043	59.17	629	6.16	172	1.68	4	0.04	-2,678	-26.22	10,213
Washington	80,479	49.21	71,906	43.97	8,382	5.12	2,679	1.64	106	0.06	8,573	5.24	163,552
Watonwan	1,960	38.48	2,752	54.02	298	5.85	81	1.59	3	0.06	-792	-15.55	5,094
Wilkin	1,095	32.61	1,988	59.20	203	6.05	71	2.11	1	0.03	-893	-26.59	3,358
Winona	12,002	45.48	11,961	45.32	1,813	6.87	594	2.25	20	0.08	41	0.16	26,390
Wright	25,896	34.96	48,173	65.04	5,009	6.76	1,523	2.06	60	0.08	-22,277	-30.08	74,069
Yellow Medicine	1,678	30.78	3,436	63.02	270	4.95	65	1.19	3	0.06	-1,758	-32.24	5,452
Totals	1,566,522	48.74	1,398,145	43.50	190,154	5.92	57,174	1.78	2,261	0.07	168,377	5.24	3,214,256

Counties that flipped from Democratic to Republican

- Beltrami (largest municipality: Bemidji)
- Kittson (largest municipality: Hallock)
- Koochiching (largest municipality: International Falls)
- Mower (largest municipality: Austin)
- Norman (largest municipality: Ada)

==== By congressional district ====
Smith and Lewis each won four of eight congressional districts.

District	Smith	Lewis	Representative
1st	42%	50%	Jim Hagedorn
2nd	48%	45%	Angie Craig
3rd	53%	40%	Dean Phillips
4th	62%	30%	Betty McCollum
5th	73%	18%	Ilhan Omar
6th	36%	56%	Tom Emmer
7th	34%	59%	Collin Peterson
7th	34%	59%	Michelle Fischbach
8th	40%	52%	Pete Stauber

== See also ==
- 2020 Minnesota elections

== Notes ==
Partisan clients
