= Mitchell Daily Republic =

Daily newspaper in Mitchell, South Dakota

- Type: Daily newspaper
- Owner: Forum Communications
- Founded: 1934
- Language: English
- Headquarters: 514 North Main Mitchell, South Dakota 57301
- Circulation: 10,202 (as of 2015)
- Website: mitchellrepublic.com

The Mitchell Daily Republic is a daily newspaper published in Mitchell, South Dakota. The paper's circulation is reported to be 9,859 and primarily serves Davison County, South Dakota. It was founded in 1934 and is currently owned by the Forum Communications out of Fargo, North Dakota.

It publishes a variety of topics from news, sports, business, entertainment, and current happenings. The community-focused publication offers subscribers unlimited access to more than 20 Midwest news sites, including websites from South Dakota, North Dakota, Minnesota, Montana, and Wisconsin.

== History ==
In 1909, W.R. Ronald, former managing editor of Sioux City Tribune, bought the Mitchell Weekly Capital. The paper later became the Mitchell Daily Republic. In 1940, his wife died suddenly. In 1951, W.R Ronald died. His son Malcom B. Ronald worked as publisher until 1955, when he died at age 52. In 1965, his widow Mrs. Florence K. Ronald sold the paper to Thomson Newspapers. In 1995, Forum Communications acquired the Daily Republic, The Dickinson Press and Worthington Daily Globe from Thomson.

== See also ==
- List of newspapers in South Dakota
