= Elmer Ellsworth Adams =

American businessman and politician

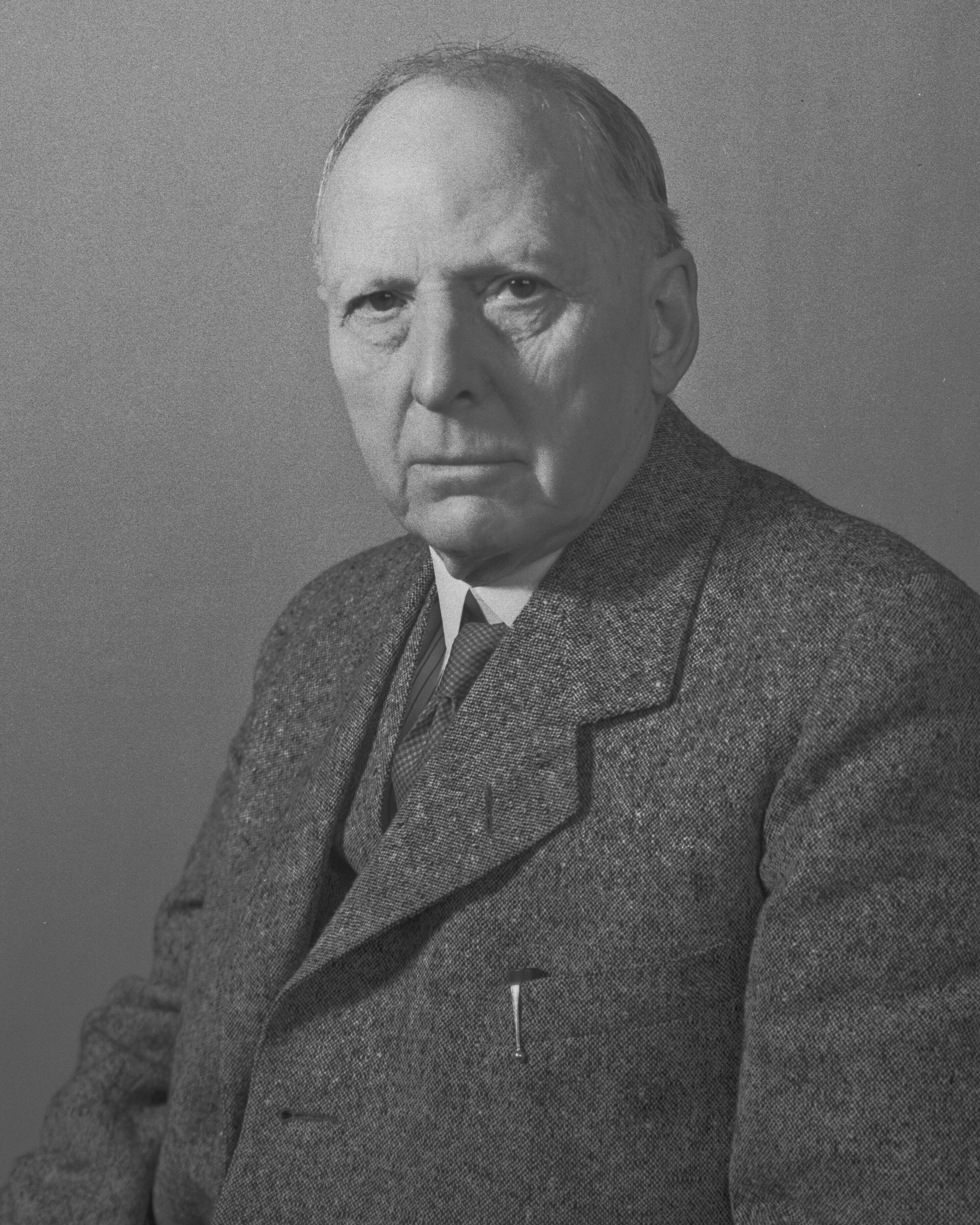
- Adams in 1935

Member of the Minnesota Senate from the 50th district
- In office January 2, 1939 – January 3, 1943
- Preceded by: T. H. Johnson
- Succeeded by: Colvin G. Butler
- In office January 5, 1931 – January 6, 1935
- Preceded by: Charles A. Lund
- Succeeded by: T. H. Johnson

Member of the Minnesota House of Representatives from the 50th district
- In office January 6, 1919 – January 2, 1921
- In office January 4, 1915 – December 31, 1916

Member of the Minnesota House of Representatives from the 59th district
- In office January 2, 1905 – January 1, 1911

Personal details
- Born: December 31, 1861 Waterbury, Vermont, U.S.
- Died: June 24, 1950 (aged 88) Fergus Falls, Minnesota, U.S.
- Party: Republican

Elmer Ellsworth Adams (December 31, 1861 – June 24, 1950) was an American politician, businessman, banker, and newspaper editor who served in the Minnesota House of Representatives in three nonconsecutive terms between 1905 and 1921 and in the Minnesota Senate for two nonconsecutive terms between 1931 and 1943. He also served as the editor of the Fergus Falls Daily Journal from 1885 to 1912.

== Early life ==
Elmer Ellsworth Adams was born on December 31, 1861, in Waterbury, Vermont. He came to Minnesota in 1878 and graduated from the University of Minnesota in 1884.

== Career ==
A year after graduating, Adams served as the editor of the Fergus Falls Daily Journal. He was a supervisor for Minnesota's 5th congressional district during the 1890 United States census. In 1897, Adams began serving as a regent of his alma mater, appointed by Governor David Marston Clough. In 1900, he again served as a census supervisor, this time for the state's 7th congressional district. Upon his election to the Minnesota House of Representatives, he resigned from his position as regent. During this time, he was also involved in the milling and banking business.

=== Political career ===
Adams was first elected to the Minnesota House of Representatives as a member of the state's 59th district during the 1904 Minnesota House of Representatives election on November 8, 1904. He secured 3,963 votes, or 18.75% of the total. Adams, a Republican, was elected alongside three other Republicans: Hans T. Hille, Charles N. Haugen, and Knud Bondy.

== Later life and death ==
Adams died on June 24, 1950, in Fergus Falls. He was 88 years old.

== Personal life ==
Adams married twice. His first wife died in 1937 and he was survived by his second wife, Fanny K. Knowles of Rochester, Minnesota. Adams was the father of three children: two daughters, Marjorie and Dorothy, and a son, Samuel.
