= Daily Globe =

Daily Globe may refer to:

- Ironwood Daily Globe, a real newspaper based in Ironwood, Michigan, United States.
- Daily Globe (Worthington), a real newspaper in Worthington, Minnesota, United States.
- St. Paul Globe, a former newspaper based in St. Paul, Minnesota, United States.
