= Republican Eagle =

Republican Eagle may refer to:

- the Coat of arms of Austria
- the Coat of arms of Germany (Bundesadler)
- the Egyptian Eagle of Saladin emblem
- Red Wing Republican Eagle, a Minnesotan newspaper
