= November 1996 North Dakota Constitutional Measure 3 =

- November 5, 1996
- Relating to the Terms of Members of the ND House of Representatives

Results
Choice	Votes	%
Yes	132,718	54.22%
No	112,047	45.78%
Total votes	244,765	100.00%
County results
Yes
60–70%
50–60%
No
60–70%
50–60%

Constitutional Measure 3 was a legislatively referred constitutional amendment that appeared on the November 5, 1996 ballot in the U.S. state of North Dakota. The measure amended the Constitution of North Dakota by increasing the term lengths of members of the North Dakota House of Representatives from two to four years, and staggering their elections so that half of the chamber is elected biennially. The measure passed.

== Amendment ==
The amendment appeared on the ballot as follows:

"This measure would lengthen the term of members of the North Dakota House of Representaties from two to four years. This measure would also provide that the legislative assembly shall establish by law a procedure whereby one-half of the members of the North Dakota House of Representatives, as nearly as is practicable, are elected biennially.

A "YES" vote means you approve the measure as summarized above.

A "NO" vote means you reject the measure as summarized above.

Shall said measure be approved?"

== Endorsements ==
For

Newspapers

- The Forum of Fargo–Moorhead
- The Jamestown Sun
Against

Newspapers

- Grand Forks Herald
- The Bismarck Tribune
