= Duluth Budgeteer News =

Newspaper

- Type: Weekly newspaper
- Format: Broadsheet
- Owner(s): Forum Communications
- Editor: Naomi Yaeger
- Founded: 1931
- Headquarters: Duluth, Minnesota, United States of America
- Website: www.duluthbudgeteer.com

The Duluth Budgeteer News (or known locally as The Budgeteer or simply The Budge) is a newspaper in Duluth, Minnesota. It is published by Forum Communications, which bought it in 2006.

== History ==
The Budgeteer News was founded in 1931 by Herb Palmer, who served as its first publisher. His son, Dick, was the second publisher and continued to write a weekly column for many years after his departure.

Over the years, the paper has had various names, including "The Budgeter," "The Family Budgeter," and "The Budgeteer Press."

For years, the paper was essentially a shopper with columns from its publisher, but not much other original editorial content.

In the mid-1990s, Murphy McGinnis Media purchased the paper and transformed it into the Budgeteer, with the slogan: "Good News for Great People Like You." The paper upped its staffing levels and began publishing twice a week. Despite positive community reaction, revenue could not support the expanded staff or the mid-week edition. The Budgeteer went back to once a week, cut staff and - in its most dramatic change - went from a traditional broadsheet to a tabloid-format newspaper.

In August 2007, the Budgeteer went through a redesign. The type is a little bigger, with more spacing between the lines.
