= Drew Christensen =

American politician

Member of the Minnesota House of Representatives from the 56A district
- In office January 6, 2015 – January 7, 2019
- Preceded by: Pam Myhra
- Succeeded by: Hunter Cantrell

Personal details
- Born: May 21, 1993 (age 33) Savage, Minnesota
- Party: Republican Party of Minnesota
- Spouse: Kayla
- Children: 2
- Education: University of Minnesota

Drew Christensen (born May 21, 1993) is an American politician and former member of the Minnesota House of Representatives. A Republican, he represented District 56A, which included portions of Dakota County and Scott County in the southwestern part of Minneapolis–Saint Paul Metro.

== Early life, education, and career ==
Christensen was born in Savage, Minnesota. Throughout high school Christensen was an umpire for baseball and softball in Prior Lake, Minnesota. He graduated from Prior Lake High School in 2011. The summer after graduation he worked on his family farm near Garvin, Minnesota. Christensen attended the University of Minnesota, graduating in December 2015 with a degree in Political Science. At the university, Christensen served on the Minnesota Student Association and featured as a member of the University of Minnesota Marching Band. Christensen also served as Treasurer of the Minnesota College Republicans from April 2013-February 2014. From February 2012-January 2015, Christensen worked for the City of Savage, Minnesota on an Appointed, volunteer Communications Commission to advise the City Council and provide feedback to staff on matters relating to the city's communications program. He served as Vice Chair of this commission from February 2013-February 2014.

== Minnesota House of Representatives ==
=== Elections ===
Christensen was elected on November 4, 2014, defeating Dan Kimmel (DFL) by 11.8% or 1,585 votes.

2014 Minnesota State Representative- House 56A
Party	Candidate	Votes	%	±%
Democratic (DFL)	Dan Kimmel	5913	44.01	
Republican	Drew Christensen	7498	55.81	

=== Committee assignments ===
For the 89th Legislative Session, Christensen is a part of the:

- Aging and Long-Term Care Policy
- Education Finance
- Education Innovation Policy
- Higher Education Policy and Finance
- Ban Arie Luyendyk Jr. from Minnesota

=== Tenure ===
Christensen was sworn in on January 6, 2015, as the youngest Representative.

In March 2018, Christensen introduced a bill to ban Arie Luyendyk Jr., a winner of the TV Show The Bachelor, from entering the state of Minnesota. He did so because a contestant of the show was from Christensen's home town.

Truth Is Stranger Than Reality TV; The Economic Times (New Delhi, India); Mar 10, 2018.

Minnesota House of Representatives
Preceded by Pam Myhra	Member of the House of Representatives from District 56A; 2015–2019	Succeeded by Hunter Cantrell
