= The Sidney Herald =

Newspaper published in Montana, US

- Type: Weekly newspaper
- Owner: Forum Communications Company
- Founder(s): F.J. Matoushek; Louis N. Barton
- Editor: James C. Falcon
- Founded: 1908
- Language: English
- Headquarters: Sidney, Montana
- Country: United States
- Circulation: 3,247
- Website: sidneyherald.com

The Sidney Herald is an American newspaper and website based in Sidney, Montana. It has been touted as the "official newspaper of Richland County, Montana".

== History ==
The Sidney Herald was first published in March 1908. It was founded by F.J. Matoushek and Louis N. Barton. Matoushek left after a month. In September 1909, William H. Ketcham, of Milford, Nebraska, assumed control of the Herald from Barton.

In 1912, W.H. Ketcham sold the paper to his son Harry G. Ketcham, who operated the paper for 18 years in total until February 1924 when he sold it to C.R. Hurley, owner of The Fairview News. That May, Hurley acquired The Richland County Chief in a partnership deal and absorbed it into the Herald.

Hurley soon acquired full ownership again and operated the paper for 34 years. He sold it in 1958 to Jay Lalonde and E.E. Krebsbach, along with sons Keith Krebsbach and Clair Krebsbach. The paper then moved its print day from Thursdays to Wednesdays.

In 1962, Walter M. Wick purchased a half interest in the Herald from Jay and Eugene Lalonde. The other owners at the time were E.E. Krebsbach, Clair Krebsbach and Keith Krebsbach. Wick Communications bought the Richland County Leader from Russ Wells in 1988 and merged it with the Sidney Herald to form the Sidney Herald-Leader.

At some point the paper's name was changed back to the Sidney Herald. In April 2024, the newspaper announced it cease publishing on Wednesdays and moving forward will only publish one day a week on Saturdays. In January 2026, Wick sold the Herald to Forum Communications Company.
