= Kristin Bahner =

American politician (born 1972)

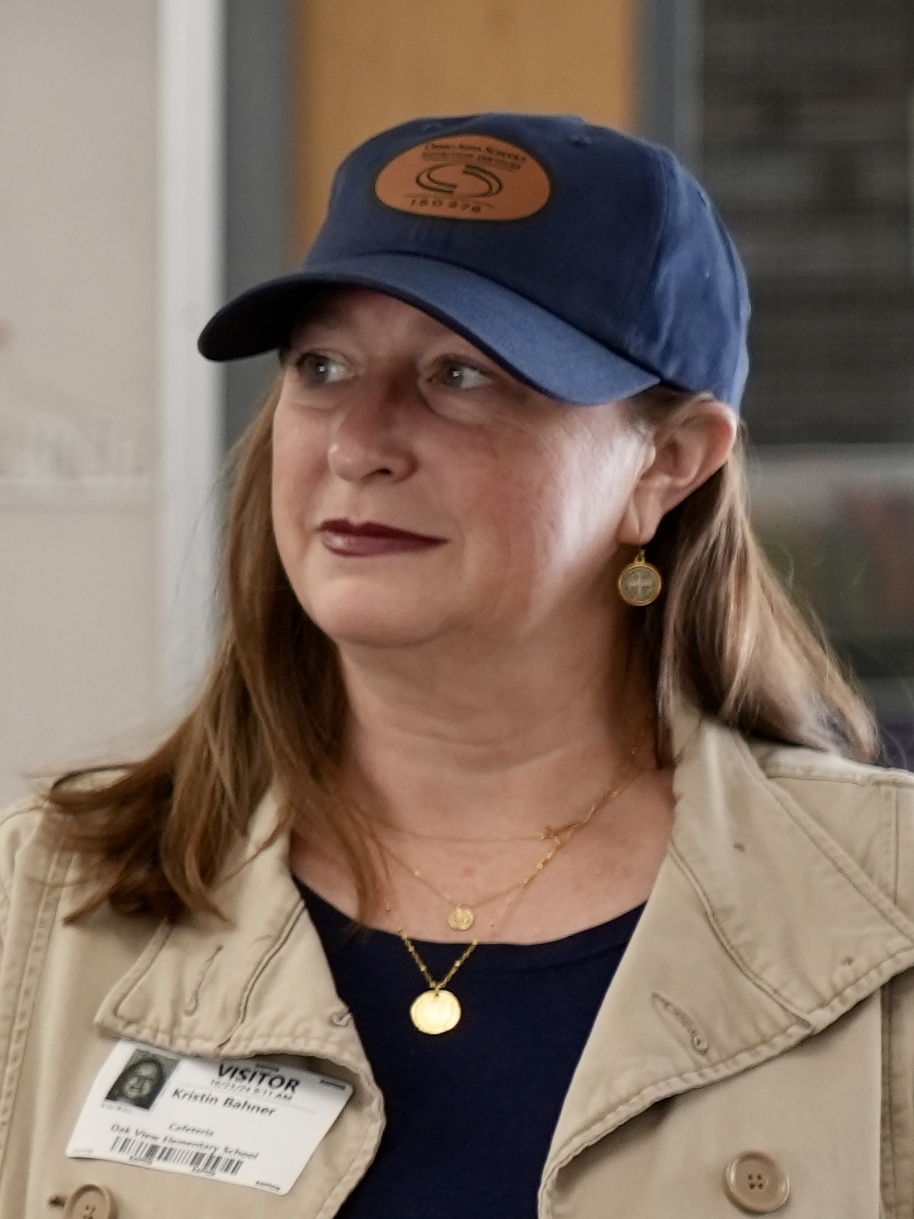
- Bahner in 2024

Member of the Minnesota House of Representatives from the 37B district
- Incumbent
- Assumed office January 8, 2019
- Preceded by: Dennis Smith

Personal details
- Born: August 15, 1972 (age 53) Richfield, Minnesota, U.S.
- Party: Democratic (DFL)
- Education: Gustavus Adolphus College (BA)
- Website: State House website Campaign website

Kristin Bahner (/ˈbɑːnər/ BAH-nər; born August 15, 1972) is an American politician serving in the Minnesota House of Representatives since 2019. A member of the Minnesota Democratic–Farmer–Labor Party (DFL), Bahner represents District 37B in the northwestern Twin Cities metropolitan area, including the city of Maple Grove in Hennepin County.

== Early life, education, and career ==
Bahner grew up in Richfield, Minnesota. She graduated from Gustavus Adolphus College in St. Peter with a bachelor of arts degree in communications. She is an IT consultant and small business owner specializing in agile software development and project management.

Bahner was one of the original organizers of the January 2017 Minnesota Women's March, where an estimated 110,000 people went to the Capitol, making it one of the largest single-day events in Minnesota history.

== Minnesota House of Representatives ==
Bahner was elected to the Minnesota House of Representatives in 2018 and has been reelected every two years since. Bahner first ran unsuccessfully in 2016, challenging one-term Republican incumbent Dennis Smith. She challenged Smith again in 2018 and won. In 2018, Bahner's race was one of the top three races that generated the most outside spending and was supported by the Give Smart project.

Bahner serves as vice chair of the Human Services Finance Committee and sits on the Elections Finance and Policy, Health Finance and Policy, and State and Local Government Finance and Policy Committees. From 2021 to 2022, she was vice chair of the Human Services Finance and Policy Committee, and from 2019 to 2020 she was vice chair of the Subcommittee on Elections.

Governor Tim Walz appointed Bahner to serve on the governor's Blue Ribbon Panel on IT Reform, now called the Governor's Technical Advisory Council. She also was appointed chair of the Legislative Commission on Cybersecurity, which was created to identify vulnerabilities in Minnesota's cybersecurity defenses. Bahner has authored legislation that would make it easier for women to get access to long-acting reversible contraceptives (LARC) shortly after giving birth.

== Assassination attempt ==
On June 14, 2025, after shooting and injuring Minnesota state representative John Hoffman alongside his wife Yvette, Vance Boelter allegedly next targeted Bahner at her home. He approached the residence at 2:24 a.m. CDT (UTC−5) dressed as a law enforcement officer and rang the doorbell, but received no response, as she was away on vacation at the time. After several minutes, Boelter left.

== Electoral history ==
2016 Minnesota State House - District 34B
Party	Candidate	Votes	%
Republican	Dennis Smith (incumbent)	13,773	55.83
Democratic (DFL)	Kristin Bahner	10,841	43.95
Write-in		55	0.22
Total votes		24,669	100.0
Republican hold			

2018 Minnesota State House - District 34B
Party	Candidate	Votes	%
Democratic (DFL)	Kristin Bahner	12,194	52.79
Republican	Dennis Smith (incumbent)	10,873	47.07
Write-in		33	0.14
Total votes		23,100	100.0
Democratic (DFL) gain from Republican			

2020 Minnesota State House - District 34B
Party	Candidate	Votes	%
Democratic (DFL)	Kristin Bahner (incumbent)	15,337	53.65
Republican	Dori Trossen	13,232	46.29
Write-in		16	0.06
Total votes		28,585	100.0
Democratic (DFL) hold			

2022 Minnesota State House - District 37B
Party	Candidate	Votes	%
Democratic (DFL)	Kristin Bahner (incumbent)	12,293	55.61
Republican	John Bristol	9,802	44.34
Write-in		11	0.05
Total votes		22,106	100.0
Democratic (DFL) hold			

2024 Minnesota State House - District 37B
Party	Candidate	Votes	%
Democratic (DFL)	Kristin Bahner (incumbent)	14,726	55.39
Republican	John Bristol	11,841	44.54
Write-in		18	0.07
Total votes		26,585	100.0
Democratic (DFL) hold			

== Personal life ==
Bahner lives in Maple Grove, Minnesota, with her partner, Brahme.
