= Richard F. Palmer =

American newspaper editor and politician

Richard Faye "Dick" Palmer
- Born: August 1, 1930; Duluth, Minnesota
- Died: December 27, 2018; Superior, Wisconsin
- Occupations: Newspaper editor, politician
- Organizations: Duluth Budgeteer News

Richard Faye "Dick" Palmer (August 1, 1930 – December 27, 2018) was an American newspaper editor and politician.

Palmer was born in Duluth, Minnesota. He went to the Duluth public schools, Denfeld High School, and to the University of Minnesota Duluth. He served in the Minnesota National Air Guard and was commissioned a captain. His family owned the Duluth Budgeteer News and Palmer wrote articles and editorials for the newspaper. Palmer served in the Minnesota Senate in 1971 and 1972. He was an independent and a Republican. He died at New Perspective Senior Living in Superior, Wisconsin.
