= Dennis Smith (politician) =

American politician

Member of the Minnesota House of Representatives from the 34B district
- In office January 6, 2015 – January 7, 2019
- Preceded by: Kurt Zellers
- Succeeded by: Kristin Bahner

Personal details
- Born: White Bear Lake, Minnesota, U.S.
- Party: Republican
- Children: 2
- Education: North Dakota State University (B.S.); William Mitchell College of Law (J.D.)
- Occupation: Attorney

Dennis Smith is an American politician and lawyer who served as a member of the Minnesota House of Representatives from 2015 to 2019. A Republican, he represented District 34B in the western Twin Cities metropolitan area. He was a candidate for Attorney General of Minnesota in 2022.

== Early life ==
Smith was born in White Bear Lake, Minnesota.

== Political career ==
=== Minnesota House of Representatives ===
Smith was first elected to the Minnesota House of Representatives in 2014. He served from 2015 to 2019.

=== 2022 Minnesota Attorney General election ===
Smith announced his candidacy for the 2022 election to the office of Minnesota Attorney General on June 3, 2021.

== Personal life ==
Dennis is the father of two children and resides in Osseo, Minnesota.
