= Daily News (Wahpeton) =

Newspaper in Wahpeton, North Dakota

Coordinates: 46.263838°N 96.608638°W

- Type: Daily newspaper
- Owner: Forum Communications Company
- Publisher: Tara Klostreich
- Managing editor: Carrie McDermot
- Founded: 1886; 140 years ago (as the Dakota Globe)
- Language: English
- Headquarters: 601 Dakota Avenue; Wahpeton, North Dakota 58074
- City: Wahpeton
- Country: United States
- Circulation: 1,574 (as of 2024)
- OCLC number: 1565796
- Website: wahpetondailynews.com

The Daily News (formally known was Wahpeton Daily News) is a newspaper published daily, except Monday and Saturday, in Wahpeton, Richland County, North Dakota. Its readers are the communities of Wahpeton and Breckenridge, Wilkin County, Minnesota.

== History ==
In 1886, the Troy brothers founded the Dakota Globe as a successor to the Wahpeton Mercury. In 1887, Fred Falley and George Fritz acquired the paper. In 1907, Falley purchased the Wahpeton Gazette and merged it with the Globe to form the Globe- Gazette. At that time Falley was publisher and Robert J. Hughes was business manager. Falley died about seven months later.

In 1921, Hughes disposed of the company to Richard M. Falley. The paper was then renamed to the Wahpeton Globe. In 1927, Elmour D. Lum, former owner of the Valley City Times-Record, purchased the Globe and Richland County Farmer for $30,000 and then merged the two to form the Farmer-Globe.

In 1944, Lum died at age 73. His two sons E. Donald Lum and D. Eldon Lum then managed the paper. In 1967, James Stuart bought the Farmer-Globe from the Lum brothers. Robert D. "Bob Collins was named publisher. In 1968, Stuart acquired the Breckenridge Valley Alert. In 1971, Stuart merged the Valley Alert and the Farmer-Globe to form the Wahpeton Daily News. In 1972, Wick Communications acquired the paper. In 1985, former co-publisher E. Donald Lum was inducted into the North Dakota Newspaper Hall of Fame. In 2026, Wick sold the Daily News to Forum Communications Company.

== See also ==
- List of newspapers in Minnesota
- List of newspapers in South Dakota
