= Park Rapids Enterprise =

- Format: Print/Online Newspaper
- Owner(s): Forum Communications Company
- Founder(s): Henry R. Cobb
- Publisher: Jody Hanson
- Editor: Shannon Geisen
- Founded: 1882
- Headquarters: 1011 1st. St. E, Suite 6
- City: Park Rapids, Minnesota
- Circulation: 2,921 (as of 2024)
- Website: parkrapidsenterprise.com

The Park Rapids Enterprise is an American, English language newspaper headquartered in Park Rapids, Minnesota, serving Hubbard County, Minnesota and the surrounding areas. It was founded in 1882 and is owned by the Forum Communications Company of Fargo, North Dakota.

The Park Rapids Enterprise provides news coverage through an online news website, a twice-weekly print edition and a daily e-paper edition available online or through an app.

== History ==
The Park Rapids Enterprise was founded in 1882 by Henry R. Cobb. After numerous changes in ownership, it was purchased by Forum Communications Company, who remains the current owner to this day.
