= The Dickinson Press =

Newspaper in Dickinson, North Dakota

- Type: Weekly newspaper
- Owner: Forum Communications
- Founder(s): Joseph T. Scott; W.W. Mabee
- Founded: 1883
- Language: English
- City: Dickinson
- Country: United States
- Circulation: 7,200 (as of 2023)
- ISSN: 1049-6718
- OCLC number: 1566609
- Website: thedickinsonpress.com

The Dickinson Press is a weekly newspaper printed in Dickinson, North Dakota. The Press, as the paper is colloquially known, is the official newspaper of Stark County, North Dakota, and circulates in southwest North Dakota. The paper is owned by Forum Communications.

== History ==
On March 31, 1883, the first edition of The Dickinson Press was published by Joseph T. Scott and W.W. Mabee. Mabee eventually left the business and Scott published the paper until October 1890, when he sold it to Myron L. Ayers.

In December 1915, Ernest L. Peterson, owner of the Milton Globe, bought the Press from Ayers. At that time the paper had a circulation of 3,000. In December 1927, the Press bought and absorbed a rival paper called the Dickinson Recorder-Post.

In August 1929, Peterson sold the paper to Mrs. Beatrice C. Mann for $107,000. In May 1931, she expanded the Press from a weekly to a tabloid daily. In August 1940, Gordon MacGregor bought the Press from Mann.

In April 1943, MacGregor died of a heart attack at age 40. In October 1955, Samuel E. Burgess, formerly of the Bronson Journal, bought the business from a group of stockholders lead by W.K. Johnson.

In November 1970, the owners of the Honolulu Star-Bulletin bought the Press from Burgess. In August 1971, the company was acquired by Gannett Co., which in March 1972 sold the Press to Clark O. Murray, Wright S. Coulson and Les Daughtry. In August 1974, the Press owners bought the Crookston Times. In 1985, Thompson Newspaper bought the Press from Murray and Daughtry. In 1995, Forum Communications acquired the paper. In January 2020, the Press reverted from a daily to a weekly.
