= Think Mutual Bank =

American mutual bank in Minnesota

Think Bank
- Company type: Mutual
- Industry: Banking; Financial services
- Founded: Rochester, Minnesota 1961
- Headquarters: Rochester, Minnesota, United States
- Area served: Minnesota
- Products: Retail banking Investment banking Commercial banking Mortgages; Insurance
- Number of employees: 300
- Website: ThinkBank.com

Think Bank is an American mutual bank based out of Rochester, Minnesota. It has eight full locations across Minnesota, as well as ten ATM locations without banks. It was founded in 1961 as the IBM Rochester Employees Credit Union. Somewhere between 1961 and 1994 they became IBM Mid-America Credit Union. In 2003, IBM Rochester Employees Credit Union became Think Federal Credit Union, and in 2007, it became Think Bank, and gave services to everyone, not just people who worked for IBM. It has locations in the Rochester and Twin Cities areas.
