= Forum Communications Company =

American media company based in Fargo, North Dakota

- Type: Private
- Industry: Television, Advertising, Broadcasting, Newspaper, Internet services
- Founded: 1913
- Headquarters: 101 5th Street North, Fargo, North Dakota 58102, United States
- Key people: Bill Marcil, Sr., Chairman; Bill Marcil, Jr., President, CEO and Publisher
- Number of employees: 800+
- Website: forumcomm.com

Forum Communications Company is an American multimedia and technology company headquartered in Fargo, North Dakota. Forum owns multiple print, online, and broadcast brands throughout Minnesota, Montana, North Dakota, South Dakota and Wisconsin, in addition to various niche media brands covering specialty interests. It has been locally owned by five generations of the Black-Marcil family.

Forum has multiple newspaper and multimedia journalism brands across four states in the upper Midwest along with several commercial printing facilities, TV broadcasting and business services. The company also owns four television stations in North Dakota, all affiliated with ABC and an NBC affiliate and independent station in South Dakota. Additional offerings are commercial printing services and business services.

== Leadership ==
J.P. Dotson officially founded the company in May 1913, a year after acquiring the Fargo Forum. He sold the company in April 1917 to Norman B. Black, who managed it until his death in January 1931 at age 65. His son Norman D. Black succeeded him as publisher, and his widow Jenny C. Black served as company president until her death in August 1951 at age 81.

In August 1955, Norman D. Black died of a sudden heart attack at age 57. He was then succeeded by his son, Noman D. Black, Jr. After he died in September 1969 at age 56, his son in law, William C. Marcil, succeeded him. In September 2010, Marcil retired and was succeeded as president and CEO by his son, Bill Marcil, Jr.

== History ==
In November 1912, the Fargo Forum was sold at public auction to J.P. Dotson, editor of the Crookston Times, for $52,500. In May 1913, The Forum Publishing Co. was incorporated with Dotson as president. In April 1917, Dotson sold the business to Norman B. Black, former general manager of the Grand Forks Herald, for over $100,000. Black's family and his descendants have owned and operated the company ever since.

In November 1954, Forum acquired the Moorhead Daily News, and in June 1957 merged it into the Forum. In 1972, the company purchased KSOO-TV of Sioux Falls and KCOO-TV of Aberdeen. At that time a subsidiary called Forum Communications, Inc. was created to manage its radio and television stations; the FCC approved the sale a year later. In October 1979, the West Central Tribune was acquired. In December 1984, William "Bill" Marcil, Sr. acquired majority company ownership. In May 1985, the Detroit Lakes Tribune, Park Rapids Enterprise and Becker County Record were acquired. In November 1985, Forum sold KSFY-TV, KABY-TV and KPRY-TV, all in South Dakota, to the News-Press & Gazette Company for $10 million.

In December 1989, the Wadena Pioneer Journal was acquired. In January 1990, the Alexandria Echo Press was acquired. In November 1992, Marcil Sr. renamed the parent company to Forum Communications Co. Forum acquired The Dickinson Press, Mitchell Daily Republic and Worthington Daily Globe from Thomson Newspapers in July 1995; The Bemidji Pioneer in January 1997, The Jamestown Sun from Hollinger Inc. in October 2000, the Grand Forks Herald, Duluth News Tribune, Superior Telegram, Lake County News-Chronicle, Cloquet Pine Journal and Duluth Budgeteer News from McClatchy in June 2006, and Rochester Post-Bulletin in May 2019.

In January 2021, Forum sold subsidiary RiverTown Multimedia to O’Rourke Media Group in January 2021. The sale included the Red Wing Republican Eagle and Hudson Star-Observer. RiverTown previously published six other papers, but closed or merged them.

In November 2022, Forum purchased KWSD and sister station KCWS-LD from Jim Simpson, for $1.4 million; the sale was completed on February 21, 2023. In August 2024, Forum acquired KNBN and KWBH-LD, both of Rapid City, South Dakota, from Jim Simpson (Rapid Broadcasting Company), bringing those stations and KSFL-TV back under common ownership. In January 2026, Forum acquired seven newspapers from Wick Communications. The deal included The Daily Journal in Minnesota; Wahpeton Daily News, Hankinson News Monitor and Williston Herald in North Dakota; Capital Journal and Madison Daily Leader in South Dakota; and Sidney Herald in Montana. That April, the McKenzie County Farmer was acquired.

On July 23, 2026, it was announced that Nexstar Media Group's CBS affiliates in seven markets would switch to digital subchannels owned by Hearst Television and Forum Communications (for the North Dakota stations) effective August 1.

== Commercial ==
- Click Content Studios offers marketing services through branded content for traditional and new media platforms.
- Forum Communications operates four printing plants in three states: Brainerd and Detroit Lakes, Minnesota; Sioux Falls, South Dakota; and a commercial plant at 4601 16th Ave. N. in Fargo, North Dakota. Commercial printing capabilities include: printing, mailing, fulfillment and various marketing services.
- JobsHQ is an online recruitment and digital advertising company focusing on employers and recruitment in Minnesota, North Dakota, South Dakota and Wisconsin.

== Print and digital news ==
The following print and digital newspapers in Minnesota, Wisconsin, South Dakota, and North Dakota are part of the Forum Communications news network:

Title	Location	Year Acquired	Notes	Sources
Alexandria Echo Press	Alexandria, Minnesota	1990		
The Bemidji Pioneer	Bemidji, Minnesota	1997		
Brainerd Dispatch	Brainerd, Minnesota	2010		
Capital Journal	Pierre, South Dakota	2026		
The Daily Journal	Fergus Falls, Minnesota	2026		
Detroit Lakes Tribune	Detroit Lakes, Minnesota	1985		
The Dickinson Press	Dickinson, North Dakota	1995		
Duluth News Tribune	Duluth, Minnesota	2006		
The Forum of Fargo-Moorhead	Fargo, North Dakota	1913		
The Globe	Worthington, Minnesota	1995		
Grand Forks Herald	Grand Forks, North Dakota	2006		
Hankinson News Monitor	Hankinson, North Dakota	2026		
The Jamestown Sun	Jamestown, North Dakota	2000		
Madison Daily Leader	Madison, South Dakota	2026		
McKenzie County Farmer	Watford City, North Dakota	2026		
The Mitchell Republic	Mitchell, South Dakota	1995		
Park Rapids Enterprise	Park Rapids, Minnesota	1985		
Perham Focus	Perham, Minnesota	2000		
Pine Journal	Cloquet, Minnesota	2006		
Pine and Lakes Echo Journal	Pequot Lakes, Minnesota	2014		
Post-Bulletin	Rochester, Minnesota	2019		
Sidney Herald	Sidney, Montana	2026		
Sioux Falls Live	Sioux Falls, South Dakota	2022	Launched by Forum, along with the acquisition of KWSD and KCWS-LD from JF Broadcasting LLC	
St. Cloud Live	St. Cloud, Minnesota	2022	Founded by Forum, with former reporters from the St. Cloud Times being hired as a part of the website launch	
Superior Telegram	Superior, Wisconsin	2006		
Wadena Pioneer Journal	Wadena, Minnesota	1989		
Wahpeton Daily News	Wahpeton, North Dakota	2026		
West Central Tribune	Willmar, Minnesota	1979		
Williston Herald	Williston, North Dakota	2026		

== Other media ==
- Agweek is based in Fargo, North Dakota and merged with Agri News based in Rochester, Minnesota, and provides a weekly print magazine, a weekly TV show, a weekly podcast and daily agricultural news online.
- Bison Media Zone based in Fargo, North Dakota, covers North Dakota State University football team and other athletics with multiple livestream events, TV shows, podcasts and online news with hosts and sports journalists Dom Izzo, Jeff Kolpack and Eric Peterson.
- Dakota Spotlight is based in Fargo, North Dakota as a true crime podcast working to uncover the truth about unsolved cases in the region.
- NewsMD covers health news and insights from local individuals and independent health professionals as well as news from the Mayo Clinic, Sanford Health, Essentia Health and more.
- Northland Outdoors covers outdoor sports stories and news focusing on the upper Midwest with Minnesota, North Dakota, South Dakota and Wisconsin online news.
- On The Minds Of Moms is based in Fargo, North Dakota and provides a bi-monthly print magazine and online news for today's modern family.
- The Rink Live covers hockey news and information with a focus on collegiate hockey throughout Minnesota, North Dakota, South Dakota and Wisconsin with a podcast and online news.

== Television stations ==
State	City	Call sign	Channel		Network					
State	City	Call sign	PSIP	RF	DT-1	DT-2	DT-3	DT-4	DT-5	DT-6
North Dakota	Fargo	WDAY-TV	6	21	ABC	True Crime Network	Independent	Ion Television	Ion Plus	Grit
North Dakota	Grand Forks	WDAZ-TV	8	8	ABC	True Crime Network	Independent	Ion Television	Ion Plus	Grit
North Dakota	Bismarck	KBMY	17	17	ABC	CBS	MyNetworkTV	Ion Television	Ion Plus	Court TV
North Dakota	Minot	KMCY	14	14	ABC	CBS	MyNetworkTV	Ion Television	Ion Plus	Court TV
South Dakota	Sioux Falls	KSFL-TV	36	36	Ion Television	YTA TV	Jewelry Television	–	–	–
South Dakota	Rapid City	KNBN	21	22	NBC	CBS	MyNetworkTV	YTA TV	–	–
