= Post Bulletin =

Newspaper in Rochester, Minnesota, US

Coordinates: 44.022810°N 92.460915°W

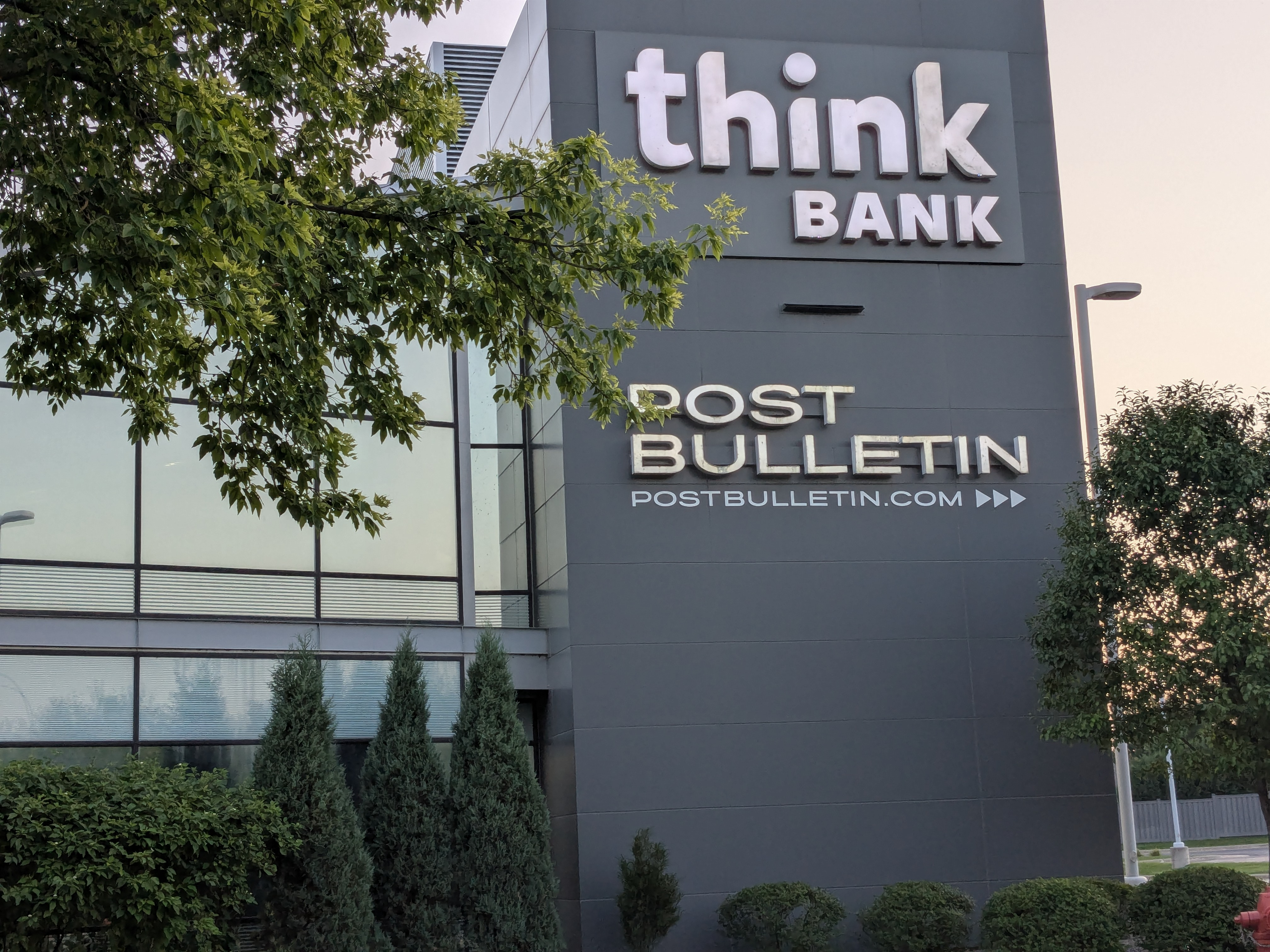
- Post Bulletin building
- Type: Semi-weekly newspaper (Tue/Sat)
- Format: Broadsheet
- Owner: Forum Communications
- Editor: Jeff Pieters
- General manager: Steve Lange
- Photo editor: Joe Ahlquist
- Founded: 1872
- Headquarters: 1700 Greenview Dr. S.W. Rochester, Minnesota
- City: Rochester
- Country: United States
- Circulation: 17,091 (as of 2024)
- OCLC number: 22368050
- Website: postbulletin.com

The Post Bulletin is a semi-weekly American newspaper and news website based in Rochester, Minnesota. The Post Bulletin also publishes an e-paper, which is published seven days a week.

== History ==
The Post and Record was formed by various newspaper mergers conducted by Amherst Blakely beginning in 1872 when he purchased the Central Record. He later purchased The Federal Union, creating The Record and Union. In 1892, he purchased The Rochester Post, creating The Post and Record. Amherst Blakely had co-founded The Rochester Post in 1859 with his brothers, but sold his interest shortly after to move to Chicago and edit The Chicago Evening Post. The Rochester Daily Bulletin was started by Archie Gove, who sold to Allen Furlow and Gregory Gentling in 1912, who sold the publication to Glenn Withers in 1916.

The Rochester Post-Bulletin was created when The Post and Record and The Rochester Daily Bulletin merged in 1925 with Withers as owner and Clarence Blakely as business manager. The Withers family ran the paper from 1925 until Bill Boyne took over in 1979. As of 2013, the Post-Bulletin employed 150 people.

In 2016, the Post Bulletin stopped using a hyphen in its nameplate, publishing as the Post Bulletin instead of the Post-Bulletin.

The Post Bulletin publishes a monthly magazine, Rochester Magazine, which is edited by Post Bulletin General Manager Steve Lange.

On May 16, 2019, it was announced that Fargo, North Dakota based Forum Communications would purchase the Post Bulletin from the Small Newspaper Group. The sale took effect June 1, 2019.

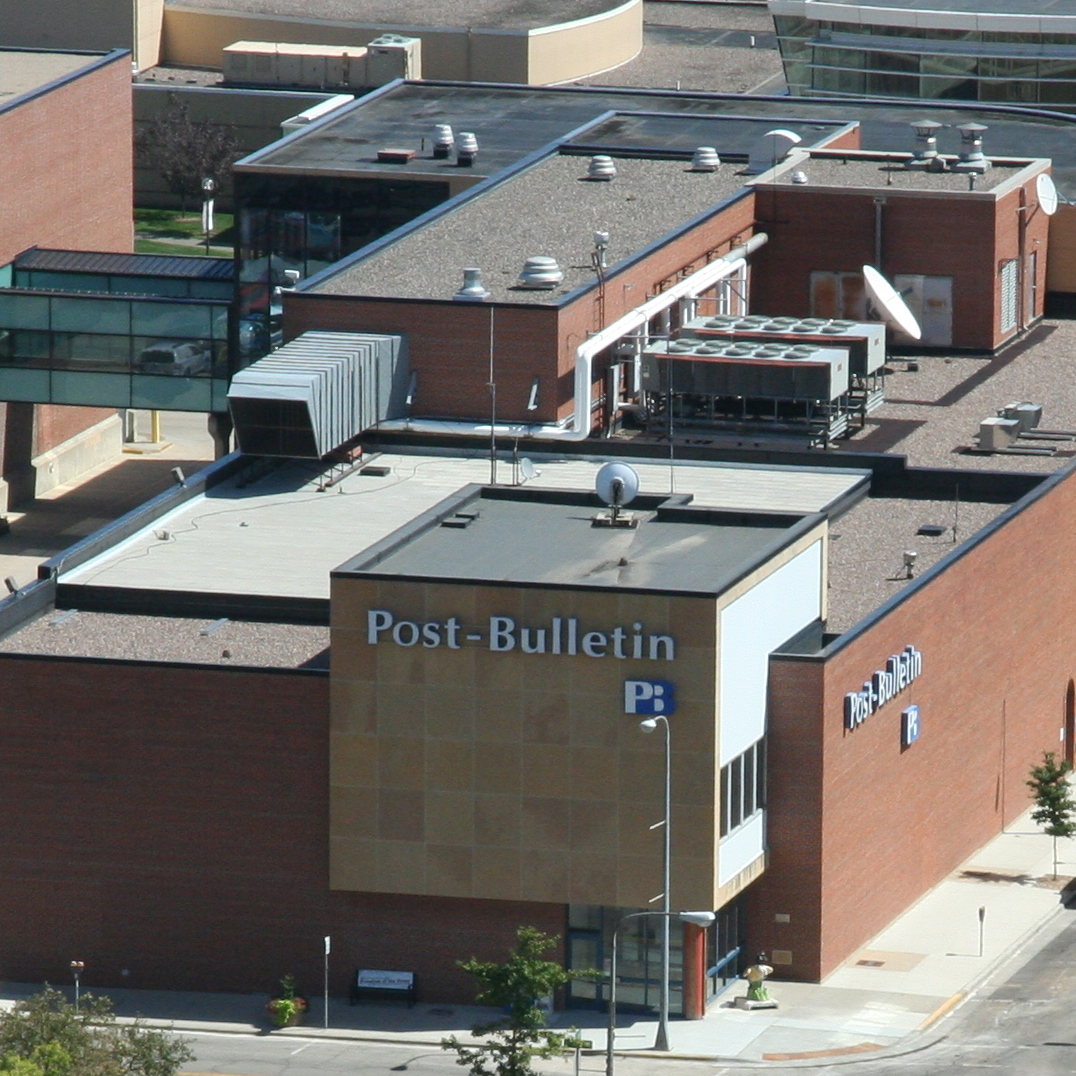
Former Post Bulletin building

Due to the sale not including the longtime downtown building where the Post Bulletin operated, on July 27, 2019, it was announced that the staff would move out of the building on First Avenue to the second floor of the Think Bank complex in Southwest Rochester. The Post Bulletin had operated in the downtown building for 63 years.

On June 24, 2020, it was announced that the Post Bulletin would switch from a daily print schedule to a two-day print schedule, with print editions to be published on Tuesday and Saturday. The change took effect July 12, 2020.
