= The Daily Journal (Fergus Falls) =

Newspaper published in Fergus Falls, Minnesota

Coordinates: 46.274143°N 96.058977°W

- Type: Daily newspaper
- Owner: Forum Communications Company
- Publisher: Ken Harty
- Editor: Heather Kantrud
- Founded: 1873; 153 years ago
- Headquarters: 125 N. Union Ave Ste 3 Fergus Falls, Minnesota 56537
- City: Fergus Falls, Minnesota
- Country: United States
- Circulation: 2,455 (as of 2024)
- Readership: Otter Tail County, Minnesota
- OCLC number: 20807828
- Website: fergusfallsjournal.com

The Daily Journal is an American, English language daily newspaper headquartered in Fergus Falls, Otter Tail County, Minnesota. It was founded in 1873. Publishing Tuesday through Saturday, it is one of 24 newspapers currently published at least five days a week in the state of Minnesota.

== History ==
The Daily Journal was founded by A. J. Underwood. His family published the newspaper until the mid-1980s. It was then purchased by Thomson Newspapers in December 1992, later to Boone Newspapers, Inc., until 2019 when it was purchased by Wick Communications. In 2026, the Journal was acquired by Forum Communications Company.

The history of The Daily Journal predecessors includes the following newspapers:

- Fergus Falls Daily Journal. (Fergus Falls, Minn.) 1883-1972
- Fergus Falls Daily Telegram. (Fergus Falls, Minn.) 1882-1885
- Fergus Falls Weekly Telegram. (Fergus Falls, Minn.) 1882-1885
- Fergus Falls Independent. (Fergus Falls, Otter Tail Co., Minn.) 1881-1883
- The Fergus Falls Journal. (The Fergus Falls, Minn.) 1873-1881
