= Jessica Hanson =

American politician (born 1986)

Member of the Minnesota House of Representatives
- Incumbent
- Assumed office January 5, 2021
- Preceded by: Hunter Cantrell
- Constituency: District 55A (2023–present); District 56A (2021–2023)

Personal details
- Born: September 13, 1986 (age 40)
- Party: Democratic (DFL)
- Children: 2
- Education: St. Catherine University (BS); Metropolitan State University (MA)
- Occupation: Senior network representative
- Website: Government website Campaign website

Jessica Hanson (born September 13, 1986) is an American politician serving in the Minnesota House of Representatives since 2021. A member of the Minnesota Democratic-Farmer-Labor Party (DFL), Hanson represents District 55A in the southern Twin Cities metropolitan area, which includes the cities of Burnsville and Savage and parts of Dakota and Scott Counties.

== Early life, education and career ==
Hanson was born and raised in Minnesota. She earned a Bachelor of Science in social work from St. Catherine University and a Master of Arts in advocacy and political leadership from Metropolitan State University. Hanson has worked as a dental network representative for Anthem since 2007.

Before her election to the legislature, Hanson led the Minnesota Campaign for Full Legalization, a nonprofit advocacy group focused on marijuana legalization.

== Minnesota House of Representatives ==
Hanson was first elected to district 56A of the Minnesota House of Representatives in 2020 after one-term DFL incumbent Hunter Cantrell announced he would not seek reelection. Hanson defeated former Republican state representative and state auditor candidate Pam Myhra by 3.3 percentage points in the general election. Myhra challenged the 2020 election results, but a judge dismissed the case for the appellant's failure to state a claim and a lack of subject-matter jurisdiction. Hanson has been reelected twice since redistricting, winning in district 55A by 6.1 points in 2022 and 6.8 points in 2024.

Hanson authored "Travis's Law", which requires 911 operators to refer calls to mental health teams trained to deescalate serious mental health episodes. The bill was named after Travis Jordan, a man considering suicide who was shot and killed by Minneapolis police in 2018. Hanson's bill passed with bipartisan support and was signed by Governor Walz.

Hanson has advocated the legalization of marijuana in Minnesota, arguing it should be done by legislation, not a constitutional referendum. She has said that regulating marijuana would benefit public health and public safety.

Hanson authored legislation to repeal a gag order on the study for a Dan Patch commuter rail line that would link Northfield, Minnesota to Minneapolis. She said that the line, which would run through Savage, Minnesota, could improve public transportation in her district. In February 2022, in response to high gas prices, she joined other DFL legislators advocating for a temporary repeal of the state gas tax.

Hanson signed on to a letter calling on the Biden administration to stop Line 3, a tar sands pipeline proposed to cut through Minnesota tribal lands.

Hanson serves as vice chair of the Economic Development Finance and Policy Committee, and sits on the Children and Families Finance and Policy, Higher Education Finance and Policy, and Human Services Policy Committees.

== Electoral history ==
2020 Minnesota State House - District 56A
Party	Candidate	Votes	%
Democratic (DFL)	Jessica Hanson	13,166	51.61
Republican	Pam Myhra	12,316	48.28
Write-in		28	0.11
Total votes		25,510	100.0
Democratic (DFL) hold			

2022 Minnesota State House - District 55A
Party	Candidate	Votes	%
Democratic (DFL)	Jessica Hanson (incumbent)	9,668	53.04
Republican	Gabriela Kroetch	8,549	46.90
Write-in		12	0.07
Total votes		18,229	100.0
Democratic (DFL) hold			

2024 Minnesota State House - District 55A
Party	Candidate	Votes	%
Democratic (DFL)	Jessica Hanson (incumbent)	12,114	53.33
Republican	Gabriela Kroetch	10,576	46.56
Write-in		24	0.11
Total votes		22,714	100.00
Democratic (DFL) hold			

== Personal life ==
Hanson lives in Burnsville, Minnesota, and has two children.
