= Hunter Cantrell =

American politician

Member-elect of the Minnesota House of Representatives from the 55B district
- Assuming office January 12, 2027
- Succeeding: Kaela Berg

Member of the Minnesota House of Representatives from the 56A district
- In office January 8, 2019 – January 5, 2021
- Preceded by: Drew Christensen
- Succeeded by: Jessica Hanson

Personal details
- Born: July 10, 1995 (age 31) Nenah, Wisconsin
- Party: Democratic–Farmer–Labor
- Education: University of Minnesota
- Occupation: Medical student, ceramic artist, wedding officiant

Hunter Cantrell (born July 10, 1995) is an American politician and member-elect to the Minnesota House of Representatives, district 55B the southern Twin Cities metropolitan area. A member of the Minnesota Democratic–Farmer–Labor Party (DFL), he previously represented District 56A in during the 2019-2020 session.

== Early life, education, and career ==
Cantrell was raised in Savage, Minnesota, where he attended Hidden Valley Elementary School, Eagle Ridge Middle School, and graduated from Burnsville High School in 2013. He attended Inver Hills Community College and the University of Minnesota, where he graduated with a Bachelor of Science in Law, Health, and Life Sciences.

Cantrell is a medical student at the University of Minnesota Medical School, ceramic artist, and wedding officiant.

== Minnesota House of Representatives ==
Cantrell was first elected to the Minnesota House of Representatives in 2018, defeating Republican incumbent Drew Christensen. He did not run for re-election in 2020, instead campaigning for fellow DFL candidate Jessica Hanson. In March 2026, he announced his candidacy for the 55B House seat being vacated by Kaela Berg. He won a four-way primary with 61% of the vote, then won with a 66% majority in the general election.

== Personal life ==
Cantrell resides in Burnsville, Minnesota. He is openly gay.

Cantrell was diagnosed with Hodgkin's lymphoma in May 2017, which is in remission after seven months of chemotherapy.
