= The Jamestown Sun =

Newspaper in Jamestown, North Dakota

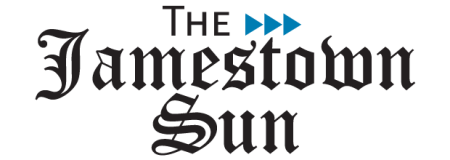
- Type: Twice-weekly newspaper
- Format: Broadsheet
- Owner: Forum Communications
- Founder: Edward H. Foster
- Publisher: Robert Keller
- Editor: Kathy Steiner
- Founded: 1878 (as Jamestown Alert)
- Language: English
- Headquarters: Jamestown, North Dakota, United States
- City: Jamestown
- Country: United States
- Circulation: 7,134 (daily)
- OCLC number: 1586324
- Website: jamestownsun.com

The Jamestown Sun is a twice weekly newspaper printed in Jamestown, North Dakota. The Sun is the official newspaper of Stutsman County, North Dakota and circulates in southeast North Dakota.

== History ==
On July 4, 1878, Edward H. Foster published the first edition of the Jamestown Alert. In October 1879, Marshall McClure acquired the paper. In January 1882, the paper was sued for libel, and years later won the suit. In March 1886, William R. Kellogg and Frank Tucker bought the Alert, but Tucker exited the firm that September.

In June 1925, brothers Percy M. Hansen and Bryon G. Hansen bought the Alert from Kellogg for $50,000. The two then expanded the paper from a weekly into a daily and renamed it to the Jamestown Sun. P.M. Hansen served as editor until April 1940, when he was appointed to manage the statewide Republican election campaign.

Both brothers served overseas in the North Dakota National Guard during World War II. After the war, B.G. Hansen bought out his brother and continued to publish the Sun until his death in December 1972, at age 77. At that time his son Gordon Hansen took over the paper. In December 1988, American Publishing Company, a holding company for Hollinger Inc., acquired the Sun.

In 1992, the paper moved from evening publication to a morning edition. In October 2000, Forum Communications acquired the Sun. At that time the paper had a circulation of 7,000. In April 2012, former owner Gordon Hansen died at age 89. In April 2020, the Sun moved to a two day schedule, printing on Wednesdays and Saturdays.
