= Brainerd Dispatch =

Coordinates: 46.358679°N 94.218973°W

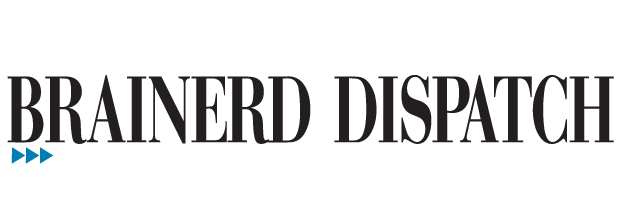
- Type: Daily newspaper (except Saturday)
- Format: Printed Wednesdays and Sundays; E-paper Mondays, Tuesdays, Thursdays and Fridays
- Owner: Forum Communications
- President: Bill Marcil, Jr.
- Editor-in-chief: Matt Erickson
- Associate editor: Renee Richardson
- Staff writers: No photographers, two writers, and two editors.
- Founded: December 22, 1881
- Language: English
- Headquarters: 506 James St. Brainerd, MN 56401
- Country: United States
- Circulation: 5,886 (as of 2024)
- Sister newspapers: Pine and Lakes Echo Journal
- OCLC number: 18528608
- Website: brainerddispatch.com

The Brainerd Dispatch is a daily morning newspaper published in Brainerd, Minnesota. The newspaper was founded on December 22, 1881, and became a daily paper in 1883. In April 2004, the Dispatch became a morning paper. In July 2020, the publication switched to twice-a-week printing and delivery. The paper is owned by Forum Communications.

== History ==
The paper was formerly owned by Stauffer Communications, which was acquired by Morris Communications in 1994.

On December 26, 2013, Fargo, North Dakota based Forum Communications Company entered a deal with Morris to purchase several newspaper properties owned by Morris Communications including the Brainerd Dispatch. The deal was set to be finalized on January 1, 2014.

On July 16, 2020, the Brainerd Dispatch newspaper did not roll off its printing presses for the first time in 137 years but was instead available to readers in a digital format.

The printed paper continued its delivery Wednesdays and Sundays in the early morning hours for paid subscribers. But on Mondays, Tuesdays, Thursdays and Fridays, its "e-paper" became the only way to view the publication's content, which still changes daily.

In June 2024, the paper announced it will close its local printing facility and shift production to the Detroit Lakes area.

== See also ==
- List of newspapers in Minnesota
