= The Globe (Minnesota newspaper) =

American newspaper

- Type: Weekly newspaper
- Owner: Forum Communications Company
- Publisher: Joni Harms
- Editor: Julie Buntjer
- Founded: 1872
- Headquarters: 416 10th St.
- City: Worthington, Minnesota
- Website: dglobe.com

The Globe is an American, English language newspaper headquartered in Worthington, Minnesota. The Globe serves Nobles County, Minnesota and the surrounding areas. It was founded in 1872 and is currently owned by the Forum Communications Company of Fargo, North Dakota.

The Globe provides news coverage through an online news website, a weekly print edition and a daily e-paper edition available online or through an app.

== History ==
Related names of the newspaper include:

- The Globe (2017–present)
- Daily Globe (1985 - 2017)
- Worthington Daily Globe (1939 - 1985)
- Worthington Advance-Herald (1904 - 1908)
- Worthington Advance (1874 - 1904)
- Worthington Western Advance (1872 - 1874)

The Globe was purchased by Forum Communications Company in 1995 and remains the current owner today.
