= The Bemidji Pioneer =

Newspaper in Bemidji, Minnesota, US

Coordinates: 47.447824°N 94.862746°W

- Type: Daily newspaper
- Owner: Forum Communications Company
- Founder: Edward Kaiser
- Publisher: Todd Keute
- Editor: Annalise Braught
- Founded: 1896
- Headquarters: 802 Paul Bunyan Dr. S. Suite 19
- City: Bemidji, Minnesota
- Circulation: 4,533 (as of 2024)
- Website: bemidjipioneer.com

The Bemidji Pioneer is an American, English language newspaper headquartered in Bemidji, Beltrami County, Minnesota. It was founded in 1896 and is currently owned by the Forum Communications Company out of Fargo, North Dakota.

The Bemidji Pioneer provides news coverage through an online news website, a twice-weekly print edition and a daily e-paper edition available online or through an app.

== History ==
The Bemidji Pioneer was founded in Bemidji in March 1896 by Edward Kaiser. The Bemidji Daily Pioneer was published by the Bemidji Publishing Company. This first Daily Pioneer newspaper included city ordinances, license applications, articles of incorporation, as well as local news, business advertisements, editorials, and church news. In the early 1900s, the newspaper covered interactions with the Ojibwe Nation from a white settlers and farmers perspective. The Ojibwe perspective was carried by the White Earth Tomahawk, the White Earth Progress, and the Red Lake News that were produced in this area. Related names of the newspaper include:

- The Bemidji Pioneer 2005-current
- The Pioneer 1971-2005
- The Bemidji Daily Pioneer (1904-1971)
- The Daily Pioneer (April 20, 1903 – 1904)
- The Bemidji Sentinel (1902-1962)
- The Bemidji Sentinel and the Great River Country News (1962-1965)
- Bemidji Weekly Pioneer (1917-1949)
- The Bemidji Pioneer (1896-1917)

In October 2019, the paper moved to publishing twice a week, Wednesday and Saturday. In May 2020, the Pioneer moved from its location on the south side of Bemidji to Paul Bunyan Drive.
