= West Central Tribune =

Coordinates: 45.121023°N 95.0476°W

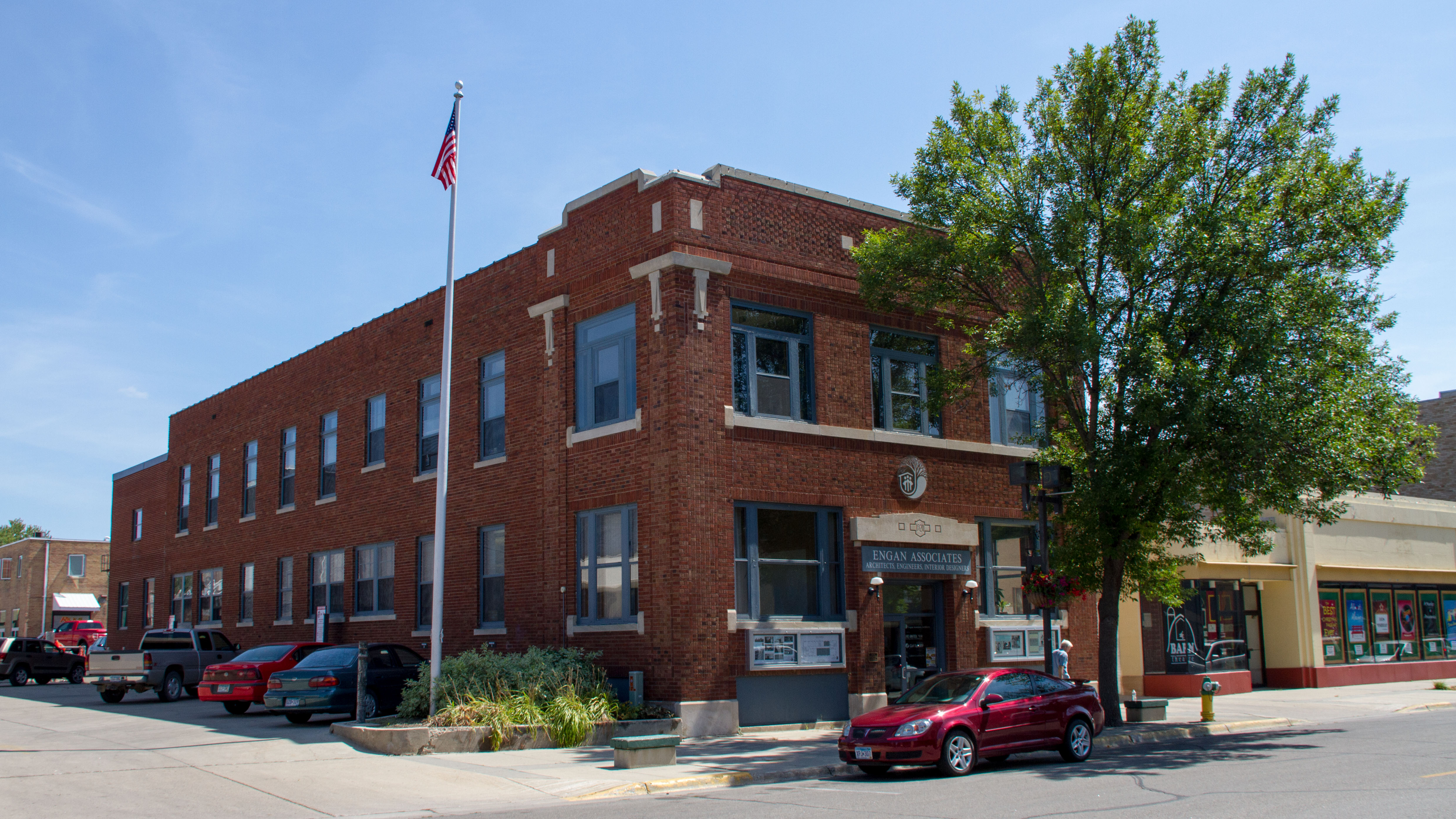
- Willmar Tribune building in Kandiyohi
- Type: Daily newspaper
- Owner(s): Forum Communications Company
- Founder(s): Dr. Christian Johnson
- Publisher: Steve Ammermann
- Editor-in-chief: Susan Lunneborg
- Editor: Kelly Boldan
- Founded: February 19, 1895; 130 years ago
- Language: American English
- Headquarters: 2208 Trott Ave. SW; Willmar, Minnesota 56201
- City: Willmar
- Country: United States
- Circulation: 7,127 (as of 2024)
- OCLC number: 21010653
- Website: wctrib.com

West Central Tribune is an American, English-language newspaper published twice weekly on Wednesdays and Saturdays in Willmar, Minnesota.

== History ==
The West Central Tribune originated with the Willmar Tribune, which was founded by Dr. Christian Johnson on February 19, 1895. Dr. Johnson was a supporter of the People's Part, which supported the small farmer and laborer. The paper started out as a four-page, eighth-column journal and eventually was expanded to eight pages. In addition to local and national news, the newspaper also included articles on progressive farming and the news in Sweden, Norway, and Denmark, from which many residents had immigrated. Dr. Johnson turned the paper over to Victor E. Lawson (1871–1960) in August 1895. Lawson remained the editor of the paper for over fifty years. The newspaper has had several names:

- West Central Tribune (1980–current)
- West Central Daily Tribune (1959–1980)
- West Central Minnesota Daily Tribune (1950–1959)
- Willmar Daily Tribune (1928–1950)
- Willmar Weekly Tribune (1931–1950)
- Willmar Tribune (1895–1931)
