= Red Wing Republican Eagle =

Coordinates: 44.567665°N 92.574614°W

Republican Eagle
- Type: Twice-weekly Newspaper
- Owner(s): O’Rourke Media Group
- Founded: September 4, 1857
- Language: American English
- Headquarters: 2760 North Service Drive; Red Wing, MN 55066-0015
- City: Red Wing
- Country: United States
- Circulation: 2,892 (as of 2024)
- ISSN: 2688-5638
- OCLC number: 1112124950
- Website: republicaneagle.com

The Red Wing Republican Eagle or Republican Eagle is an American, English language newspaper in Red Wing, Minnesota. The publisher is Neal Ronquist and the editor is Anne Jacobson. The Red Wing Republican Eagle publishes two days a week – Wednesday and Saturday – and has a weekend supplement has a circulation in excess of 20,000.

== History ==
The first edition of the Red Wing Republican hit the streets on September 4, 1857. It was a four-page edition produced by Lucius F. Hubbard, who had arrived by steamboat with an ancient hand press just a few weeks before. The 21-year-old tinsmith from upstate New York became the ninth governor of Minnesota 25 years later.

The newspaper became the Daily Republican on October 12, 1885, and merged with the rival Daily Eagle in 1940. The Daily Republican Eagle's first edition came out November 25 of that year. The newspaper dropped "daily" from its flag in 1969. Forum Communications purchased the Republican Eagle in 2001. In late 2009, the paper switched from daily publication to twice weekly.

In 2019, the Pierce County Herald merged into the Republican Eagle. In 2021, the Republican Eagle was sold by Forum Communications Company to O'Rourke Media Group.
