= List of newspapers in Minnesota =

Daily newspapers in Minnesota

This list of newspapers in Minnesota shows newspapers that are published currently in the state of Minnesota in the United States of America. According to records of the Library of Congress, there have been throughout its history almost 4,000 newspaper titles in the current area of the state of Minnesota. At the end of 2025, there were over 200 newspapers in publication in Minnesota. The earliest paper was the Minnesota Weekly Democrat in St. Paul in 1803 well before statehood in 1858. There are three newspapers that trace their roots back to before Minnesota statehood in 1858. The oldest, continually published newspaper is the St. Paul Pioneer Press.

== Daily newspapers ==
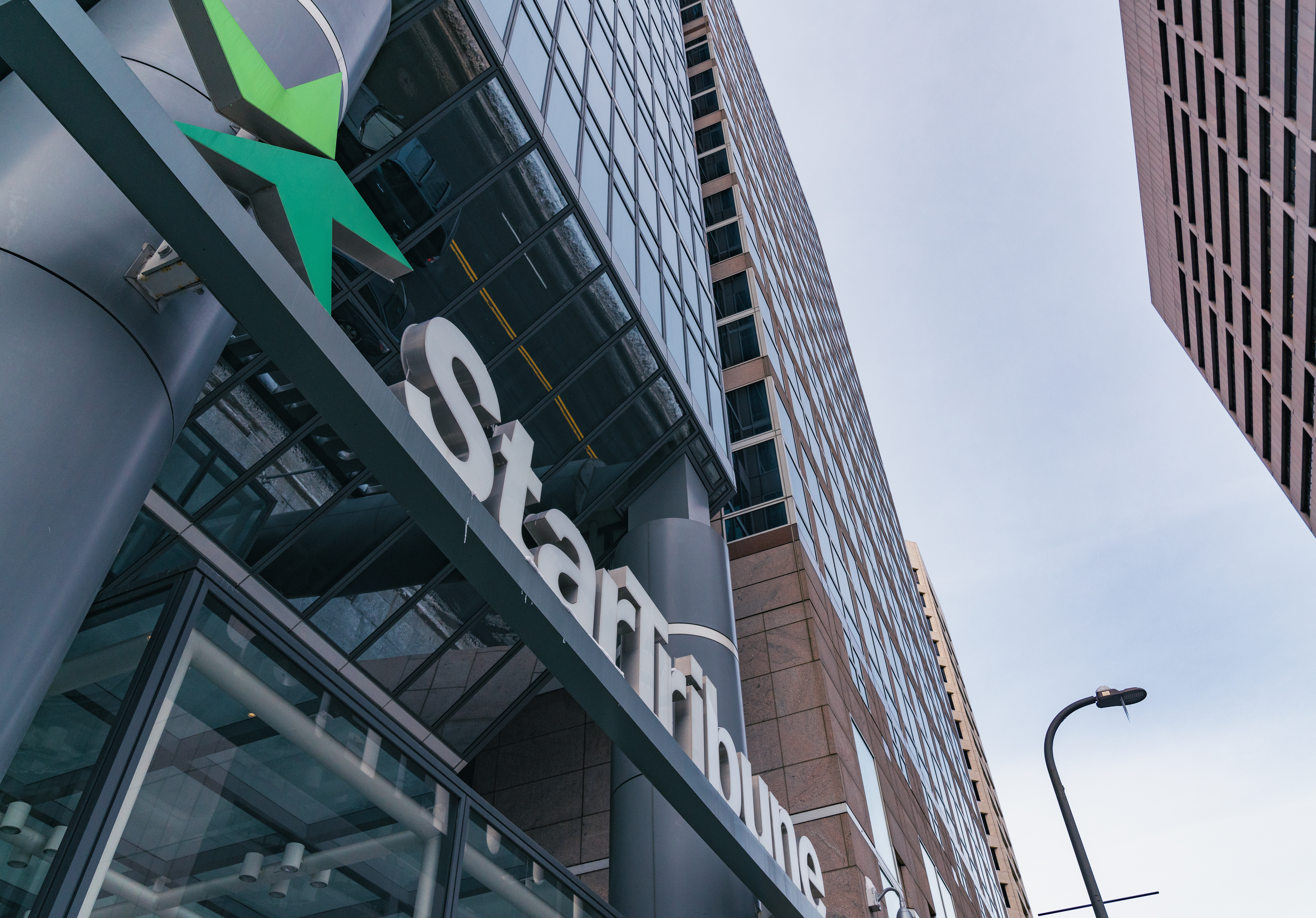
Star Tribune

According to the Minnesota Newspaper Association in 2020, there were 24 daily newspapers in print in Minnesota. As of 2025, The Star Tribune has the largest print circulation in the state. The table below lists these daily newspapers that are printed at least five days a week. Many also have on-line and Facebook sites for interacting with readers and disseminating news. The cities and counties listed are the locations of the newspaper's headquarters. Circulation numbers are the 2022 data in the Minnesota Newspaper Association directory.

Current daily newspapers in Minnesota
| Title | City | County | Year est. | Frequency | Owner | Weekday Circulation | Ref. |
|---|---|---|---|---|---|---|---|
| Finance & Commerce | Minneapolis | Hennepin | 1887 | Tue-Sat | USA Today Co. | 1,336 | |
| Free Press, The | Mankato | Blue Earth | 1887 | Tue-Sat | CNHI | 12,705 | |
| Journal, The | New Ulm | Brown | 1898 | Tue-Sat | Ogden Newspapers | 4,680 | |
| Marshall Independent | Marshall (Note: The Independent traces its roots back to 1873 when The Prairie Schooner was founded.) | Lyon | 1873 | Tue-Sat | Ogden Newspapers | 3,540 | |
| Mesabi Tribune | Virginia | Saint Louis | 1893 | Tue-Sat | Adams Publishing Group | 7,952 | |
| Minnesota Star Tribune, The | Minneapolis | Hennepin | 1867 | Sun-Sat | Star Tribune Media Company LLC /Glen Taylor | 54,800 | |
| Sentinel | Fairmont | Martin | 1885 | Mon-Sat | Ogden Newspapers | 2,939 | |
| St. Cloud Times | St. Cloud | Stearns | 1861 | Sun-Fri | USA Today Co. | 8,598 | |
| St. Paul Pioneer Press | Saint Paul | Ramsey | 1849 | Sun-Sat | Digital First Media | 15,700 | |

== Online only newspapers ==
The following newspapers are published online and do not have print circulation:

Current online-only newspapers in Minnesota
| Title | City | County | Year est. | Update Freq. | Owner | Newsletter Subscribers | Ref. |
|---|---|---|---|---|---|---|---|
| Alpha News | Minneapolis | Hennepin | 2016 | Daily | Member supported | | |
| Asian American Press | St. Paul | Ramsey | 1982 | Weekly until 2014, Digital thereafter | Asian Business & Community Pub. | | |
| Axios Twin Cities | | | 2021 | Daily | Cox Enterprises | 70,000 | |
| Carver County Local News | Chaska | Carver | 2024 | Daily | 501(c)(3) Nonprofit | 1,207 | |
| Duluth Shipping News | Duluth | Saint Louis | 1995 print, 2015 digital only | Daily | Kenneth Newhams | | |
| Eden Prairie Local News | Eden Prairie | Hennepin | 2020 | Daily | 501(c)(3) Nonprofit | 3,700 | |
| The Minnesota Daily | Minneapolis | Hennepin | 1900 | Daily | 501(c)(3) Nonprofit | 70,345 | |
| Minnesota Reformer (States Newsroom) | | | 2020 | Daily | Member supported | 7,500 | |
| MinnPost | Minneapolis | Hennepin | 2007 | Daily | Member supported | 20,000 | |
| Prior Lake News Compass | Prior Lake | Scott | 2024 | Weekly | 501(c)(3) Nonprofit | 1,525 | |
| Racket | Minneapolis | Hennepin | 2021 | Daily | Member supported | 4,462 | |
| Sahan Journal | | | 2019 | Daily | Member supported | 14,000 | |
| Sun ThisWeek (Note: co-located with the Dakota County Tribune) | Apple Valley | Dakota | 1979 | Weekly (free) | Adams Publishing Group | | |
| Twin Cities Arts Reader | Bryn Mawr | Hennepin | 2014 | | | | |
| Twin Cities Daily Planet | Minneapolis-St. Paul | Ramsey | 2006 | Ceased in 2019 | Twin Cities Media Alliance | | |
| Woodbury News Net | Woodbury | Washington | 2024 | Weekly | 501(c)(3) Nonprofit | 2,951 | |

== Special interest newspapers ==
Special interest newspapers in Minnesota
| Title | Interest | City | County | Year est. | Frequency | Owner | Circulation | Ref. |
|---|---|---|---|---|---|---|---|---|
| Access Press | Disability advocacy | St. Paul | Ramsey | | Monthly (10th) | Tim Benjamin | 11000 | |
| American Jewish World | Jewish | Minneapolis, St. Paul | | 1912 | Bi-Weekly | | | |
| AfricaPaper (Note: The Africa Paper was also known as the African Journal) | Africa | Brooklyn Park | Hennepin | | Monthly | Africa Institute for International Reporting | 10000 | |
| AgriNews | Agribusiness | Rochester | Olmsted | 1976 | Weekly (Thurs.) | Forum Communications | 15435 | |
| Asian Pages | Asian American | St. Paul | Ramsey | | Semi-Monthly (1st, 15th) | | 25000 | |
| Catholic Spirit, The | Catholic | St. Paul | Ramsey | 1911 | Weekly (Thurs.) | Archdiocese of Saint Paul and Minneapolis | 60000 | |
| China Insight | China–United States relations | Minnetonka | Hennepin | | Monthly (12th) | | 10000 | |
| Circle, The | Native American News and Art | Minneapolis | Hennepin | | Monthly (1st) | Cat Whipple | 13000 | |
| City Business | Business | Minneapolis | Hennepin | | Weekly (Fri.) | | 16727 | |
| Feedstuffs | Agribusiness | Minnetonka | Hennepin | | Weekly | | | |
| Gente de Minnesota | Hispanic | Minneapolis | Hennepin | | Weekly (Thurs.) | | 10000 | |
| Heraldo Pages | Hispanic | Sauk Centre | Stearns | | Semi-Monthly (2nd and 4th Wed.) | | | |
| Hmong Pages | Hmong people | St. Paul | Ramsey | 2010 | Monthly | Cheu Lee | | |
| Hmong Times | Hmong people | St. Paul | Ramsey | 1998 | Varies | | 15,000 | |
| Hmong Today | Hmong people | St. Paul | Ramsey | 2004 | Biweekly | | | |
| Insight News | News, Business, Arts | Minneapolis | Hennepin | | Weekly (Mon.-Northside, Tue.-St. Paul, Wed.-Southside) | | 35000 | |
| Job Dig | Jobs | St. Louis Park | Hennepin | | Weekly (weekends) | | 150000 | |
| Korean Quarterly | Korean news | St. Paul | Ramsey | | Jan., Apr., Jul., Oct. | | 9500 | |
| Kurier Polski | Polish | Roseville | Ramsey | | Monthly | | | |
| Labor Review | Labor issues | Minneapolis | Hennepin | | Monthly | | 60000 | |
| La Prensa de Minnesota | Hispanic | Minneapolis | Hennepin | | Weekly (Mon.) | | 14,200 | |
| The Land | Rural Life | Mankato | Blue Earth | | Weekly (Fri.) | | 20789 | |
| Latino Midwest News | Hispanic | Robbinsdale | Hennepin | | Semi-Monthly (1st, 3rd Thurs.) | | 20000 | |
| La Matraca Magazine | Minneapolis-St. Paul (Spanish) | Hennepin | Hispanic | 2007 | Weekly (Thurs.) | | | |
| Longfellow Whatever | Longfellow community | Minneapolis | Hennepin | 2024 | Varies | | | |
| MCCL News | Minnesota Citizens Concerned for Life | Minneapolis | Hennepin | | Monthly | | 33000 | |
| Minneapolis Labor Review | Labor | Duluth | Saint Louis | | Bi-Weekly (Wed.) | | 16,600 | |
| Minnesota Christian Chronicle | Christian | Minneapolis | Hennepin | | Monthly | | | |
| Minnesota Explorer | Tourism | St. Paul | Ramsey | | | | | |
| Minnesota Good Age | Senior citizens | Minneapolis | Hennepin | | Monthly (1st) | | 70000 | |
| Minnesota Lawyer | Legal profession | Minneapolis | Hennepin | | Weekly (Mon.) | | 2715 | |
| Minnesota Legionnaire | American Legion | St. Paul | Ramsey | | Monthly | | 107311 | |
| Minnesota Parent | Parenting | Minneapolis | Hennepin | | Monthly | | 70000 | |
| Minnesota Real Estate Journal | Realtors | Bloomington | Hennepin | | Bi-Weekly (Mon.) | | 3579 | |
| Minnesota Spokesman-Recorder | African-American | Minneapolis | Hennepin County, Minnesota | 1934 | Weekly (Thu.) | Tracey Williams-Dillard | 9800 | |
| Minnesota's Women's Press | Women's issues | St. Paul | Ramsey | | Bi-Weekly (Wed.) | | 40000 | |
| Native American Press/Ojibwe News | Native American | Bemidji | Bemidji | | Ceased publication in 2009 | | | |
| NatureScape News | Nature | McGregor | Aitkin | | 16 issues per year | May no longer exist | | |
| One Nation News | Minority news perspective | Minneapolis | Hennepin | | Weekly (Wed.) | Black Heart, Inc. | 20,000 | |
| Outdoor News | Outdoor recreation | Minneapolis | Hennepin | | Weekly (Wed.) | | 57,053 | |
| Phoenix Spirit | Recovery, renewal, growth | Plymouth | Hennepin | | Bi-Monthly | | 15,000 | |
| Pro-Family News | Family values | Minneapolis | Hennepin | | Monthly | | 12,000 | |
| Senior Perspective | Seniors | Glenwood | Pope | | Monthly (27th) | | 60,000 | |
| St. Cloud Visitor | Catholics | St. Cloud | Stearns | | | | 45,500 | |
| St. Paul Legal Ledger | Public policy | St. Paul | Ramsey | | Weekly (Mon., Thurs.) | | 750 | |
| Zerkalo – Minnesota News | Russian Americans | Twin Cities | Hennepin | | Monthly (10th, 25th) | | 4,500 | |

== Non-daily print newspapers ==
The following newspapers are published in the state of Minnesota, as of 2019, with a print frequency of less than five days a week.

Current Non-Daily Newspapers in Minnesota
| Title Northeaster | City. Minneapolis, St Anthony, Columbia Heights, Hilltop | County Hennepin, Anoka and Ramsey | Year est. 1978 | Frequency twice monthly | Owner | Circulation 32,000 | Ref. |
|---|---|---|---|---|---|---|---|
| Access Press | St Paul | Ramsey | | Monthly (10th) | Tim Benjamin | 13,600 | |
| Aitkin Independent Age | Aitkin | Aitkin | 1883 | Weekly (Wed.) | Adams Publishing Group | 2,461 | |
| Albert Lea Tribune | Albert Lea | Freeborn | 1897 | Wed / Sat | Boone Newspapers | 3,367 | |
| Anoka County Union Herald | Coon Rapids | Anoka | | Weekly | Adams Publishing Group | 2,405 | |
| Arrowhead Leader | Moose Lake | Carlton | | Weekly (Mon.) | Ruth Hanson | 1,414 | |
| Askov American | Askov | Pine | | Weekly (Thurs.) | Franklin Newspapers | 1,353 | |
| Austin Daily Herald | Austin | Mower | 1891 | Wed / Sat | Boone Newspapers | 2,263 | |
| Barnesville Record-Review | Barnesville | Clay | 1886 | Weekly (Mon.) | Prim Group (Eugene Prim) | 1,414 | |
| Becker County Record (Note: The Becker County Record and Detroit Lakes Tribune share a common online website with separate weekly print publications.) | Detroit Lakes | Becker | | Weekly (Wed.) | Forum Communications | 13,608 | |
| Benton County News | Foley | Benton | | Weekly (Tue.) | Star Publications (newspapers) | 1,342 | |
| Blaine, Spring Lake Park, Columbia Heights, Fridley Life | Coon Rapids | Anoka | | Weekly (Fri.) | Adams Publishing Group | 8,421 | |
| Brainerd Dispatch | Brainerd | Crow Wing | 1881 | Wed / Sat | Forum Communications | 6,742 | |
| Carver County News | Watertown | Carver | | Weekly | Adams Publishing Group | | |
| The Caledonia Argus | Caledonia | Houston | | Weekly (Wed.) | Adams Publishing Group | 1,600 | |
| The Cannon Falls Beacon | Cannon Falls | Goodhue | | Weekly (Thurs.) | O'Rourke Media Group | 2,569 | |
| Champlin-Dayton Press | Osseo | Hennepin | | Weekly (Thurs.) | Adams Publishing Group | 1,157 | |
| Chaska Herald | Chaska | Carver | | Weekly (Thurs.) | Digital First Media | 6,903 | |
| Chisholm Tribune-Press | Chisholm | Saint Louis | | Weekly | Adams Publishing Group | 733 | |
| Chisago County Press | Lindstrom | Chisago | | Weekly (Thurs.) | Matt Silver | 3,413 | |
| Clay County Union | Ulen | Clay | | Weekly (Mon.) | Prim Group (Eugene Prim) | 992 | |
| Cook County News-Herald | Grand Marais | Cook | | Weekly (Sat.) | CherryRoad Media | 2,667 | |
| Cottonwood County Citizen | Windom | Cottonwood | | Weekly (Wed.) | Citizen Publishing | 2,210 | |
| County News Review | Cambridge, North Branch | Chisago, Isanti | 2019 | Weekly (Thurs.) | Adams Publishing Group | 1,443 | |
| Crookston Daily Times | Crookston | Polk | 1891 | Semi-Weekly (Mon, Wed) | CherryRoad Media | 733 | |
| Crow River News | Osseo | Wright | | Weekly (Thurs.) | Adams Publishing Group | 1,099 | |
| Daily Journal, The | Fergus Falls | Otter Tail | 1873 | Wed / Sat | Wick Communications | 2,641 | |
| Daily News | Breckenridge, Minnesota, Wahpeton, North Dakota | Wilkin | 1971 | Tue / Thu / Sat | Wick Communications | 1,832 | |
| Dakota County Tribune | Apple Valley | Dakota | | Weekly (Fri.) | Adams Publishing Group | 9,128 | |
| Dawson Sentinel | Dawson | Lac qui Parle | 1898 | Weekly (Wed.) | Dave Hickey | 1550 | |
| Detroit Lakes Tribune | Detroit Lakes | Becker | | Semi-Weekly (Sun, Wed) | Forum Communications | 2,629 | |
| Duluth News Tribune | Duluth | Saint Louis | 1869 | Wed / Sat | Forum Communications | 16,589 | |
| East Side Review | St. Paul | Ramsey | | Weekly (Sun.) | Lillie Suburban Newspapers, Inc. | Defunct | |
| Echo Press | Alexandria | Douglas | | Semi-Weekly (Wed, Fri) | Forum Communications | 5,551 | |
| Ely Echo | Ely | Saint Louis | | Weekly (Sat.) | Wognum Group | 3.200 | |
| Faribault County Register | Blue Earth | Faribault | | Weekly (Mon.) | Ogden Newspapers | 2,428 | |
| Faribault Daily News | Faribault | Rice | 1948 | Tue-Thu, Sat | Adams Publishing Group | 2,542 | |
| Forum, The | Moorhead (Note: The Forum of Fargo-Moorhead is printed in Fargo, North Dakota. It covers content from Moorhead and the region) | Clay | 1891 | Wed / Sat | Forum Communications | 19,860 | |
| Frazee Vergas Forum | Frazee | Becker | | Weekly (Tue.) | Henning Publications | 1,295 | |
| The Globe | Worthington | Nobles | 1886 | Weekly (Wed.) | Forum Communications | 3,507 | |
| Grand Forks Herald (Note: Grand Forks, North Dakota borders Minnesota and the Grand Forks newspaper has readers in East Grand Forks, Minnesota.) | East Grand Forks, Grand Forks, North Dakota | Polk, Grand Forks County, North Dakota | 1879 | Wed / Sat | Forum Communications | 13,390 | |
| Grand Rapids Herald-Review | Grand Rapids | Itasca | | Semi-Weekly (Sun, Wed) | Adams Publishing Group | 4,521 | |
| Granite Falls Advocate Tribune | Granite Falls | Yellow Medicine | | Weekly (Wed.) | CherryRoad Media | 1,491 | |
| Hastings Star Gazette | Hastings | Dakota | 1857 | Weekly (Thurs.) | Forum Communications | Defunct | |
| The Hawley Herald | Hawley | Clay | | Weekly (Mon.) | Prim Group (Eugene Prim) | 1,626 | |
| Hibbing Daily Tribune | Hibbing | Saint Louis | 1893 | Ceased in 2020 | Adams Publishing Group | 0 | |
| Hinckley News | Hinckley | Pine | | Weekly (Thurs.) | Franklin Newspapers | 1,081 | |
| The Kenyon Leader | Kenyon | Goodhue | | Weekly (Wed) | Adams Publishing Group | 635 | |
| The Kerkhoven Banner | Kerkhoven | Swift | | Weekly (Wed.) | Village Ink | 928 | |
| Lake Park Journal | Hawley | Becker | | Weekly (Mon.) | Prim Group (Eugene Prim) | 1,626 | |
| Lakeshore Weekly News | Wayzata | Hennepin | | Weekly (Thurs.) | Digital First Media | 8,000 | |
| Le Center Leader | Le Center | Le Sueur | | Weekly | Adams Publishing Group | | |
| Monitor | St. Paul | Ramsey | 1978 | Monthly | TMC Publications | 25,000 | |
| Montevideo American-News | Montevideo | Chippewa | | Weekly (Wed.) | CherryRoad Media | 1,563 | |
| Montgomery Messenger | Montgomery | Le Sueur | | Weekly (Thurs.) | Suel Printing Company | 957 | |
| Moose Lake Star-Gazette | Moose Lake | Carlton | | Weekly (Thurs.) | Northstar Media. Inc. | 1,168 | |
| North News | Minneapolis | Hennepin | | Monthly (last Fri.) | Pillsbury United Communities & Kenzie O’Keefe | 28,300 | |
| The New Babbitt Weekly News | Babbitt | Saint Louis | | Weekly (Fri.) | Wognum Group | 833 | |
| New York Mills Dispatch | New York Mills | Otter Tail | | Weekly (Wed.) | Henning Publications | 746 | |
| News-Record | Zumbrota | Goodhue | | Weekly (Wed.) | Peter Grimsrud | 2,786 | |
| Norman County Index | Ada | Norman | 1883 | Weekly (Tue.) | Ross Pfund | 1,427 | |
| Northfield News | Northfield | Rice | | Weekly (Wed.) | Adams Publishing Group | 2,343 | |
| Ortonville Independent | Ortonville | Big Stone | | Weekly (Tue.) | Kaercher Group | 1,500 | |
| Osseo-Maple Grove Press | Osseo | Hennepin | | Weekly (Thurs.) | Adams Publishing Group | 1,157 | |
| Owatonna People's Press | Owatonna | Steele | 1874 | Tue-Thu, Sat | Adams Publishing Group | 2,962 | |
| Park Rapids Enterprise | Park Rapids | Hubbard | | Weekly (Wed., Sat.) | Forum Communications | 2,634 | |
| Pelican Rapids Press | Pelican Rapids | Otter Tail | 1897 | Weekly (Thurs.) | Jeff & Julie Meyer | 1,837 | |
| Pine County Courier | Sandstone | Pine | | Weekly (Thurs.) | Franklin Newspapers | 1,308 | |
| Pine City Pioneer | Pine City | Pine | 1897 | Weekly (Thurs.) | Northstar Media Group | 1,862 | |
| The Pine Journal | Cloquet | Carlton | | Weekly (Thurs.) | Forum Communications | 1,623 | |
| The Pioneer | Bemidji | Beltrami | 1896 | Semi-Weekly (Wed., Sat.) | Forum Communications | 3,850 | |
| Post-Bulletin | Rochester | Olmsted | 1872 | Tue / Sat | Forum Communications | 13,250 | |
| Red Wing Republican Eagle | Red Wing | Goodhue | 1857 | Semi-Weekly (Wed., Sat.) | O’Rourke Media Group | 3,440 | |
| Redwood Falls Gazette | Redwood Falls | Redwood | | Weekly (Mon. Thurs.) | CherryRoad Media | 1,480 | |
| Rock County Star Herald | Luverne | Rock | | Weekly (Thurs.) | Tollefson Group | 2,050 | |
| Sartell-St.Stephen Newsleader | Saint Cloud | Stearns | | Weekly (Fri.) | Von Meyer Publishing Inc. | 9,108 | |
| Sauk Centre Herald | Sauk Centre | Stearns | | Weekly (Thurs.) | Star Publications (newspapers) | 1,819 | |
| Sauk Rapids Herald | Sauk Rapids | Benton | | Weekly (Sat.) | Star Publications (newspapers) | 5,306 | |
| Patriot | Becker | Sherburne | | Weekly (Sat.) | Morgan, Meyer, Hanson, Nelson Group | 16,992 | |
| The Sleepy Eye Herald Dispatch | Sleepy Eye | Brown | | Weekly (Thurs.) | CherryRoad Media | 996 | |
| Southwest Journal | Minneapolis, Minnesota | Hennepin | 1990 | Bi-Weekly (Thurs.) | Minnesota Premier Publications | Defunct | |
| Staples World | Staples | Todd | | Weekly (Wed.) | Richard Gail | 1,105 | |
| Star Post | Sauk Centre | Stearns | | Weekly (Wed.) | Star Publications | 2,674 | |
| Star News | Elk River | Sherburne | | Weekly (Sat.) | Adams Publishing Group | 19,968 | |
| The Timberjay | Tower | Saint Louis | | Weekly (Fri.) | Helmberger Group | 3,091 | |
| St. James Plaindealer | St. James | Watonwan | | Weekly (Thurs.) | CherryRoad Media | 930 | |
| St. Joseph Newsleader | St. Joseph | Stearns | | Weekly (Fri.) | Von Meyer Publishing Inc | 3,841 | |
| St. Peter Herald | St. Peter | Nicollet | | Weekly (Thurs.) | Adams Publishing Group | 1,009 | |
| Le Sueur County News | Le Sueur | Le Sueur | | Weekly (Wed.) | Adams Publishing Group | 784 | |
| South Central News | Keister | Fairbault | 2019 | Weekly (Th.) | Heather Goldman, Nicole Swanson | 1,599 | |
| Stevens County Times | Morris | Stevens | 1882 | Weekly (Sat.) | Forum Communications | 1,807 | |
| Stewartville Star | Stewartville | Olmsted | 1891 | Weekly (Tue.) | Stewartville Star & Print Shop | 2,170 | |
| Sun Current | Eden Prairie | Hennepin | | Weekly (Thurs.) | Adams Publishing Group | 14,148 | |
| Sun Focus | Fridley | Anoka | | Weekly | Adams Publishing Group | | |
| Sun-Post | Eden Prairie | Hennepin | | Weekly (Thurs.) | Adams Publishing Group | 5,574 | |
| Sun Sailor (Hopkins, Minnetonka) | Eden Prairie | Hennepin | | Weekly (Thurs.) | Adams Publishing Group | 9,318 | |
| Sun Sailor (Plymouth, Wayzata) | Eden Prairie | Hennepin | | Weekly (Thurs.) | Adams Publishing Group | 9,318 | |
| Union-Times (Note: The Union-Times was formerly called the Mille Lacs County Times.) | Princeton | Mille Lacs | | Weekly (Thurs.) | Adams Publishing Group | 1,703 | |
| Villager (Note: The Village was formerly known as the Highland Villager) | St. Paul | Ramsey | 1953 | Semi-Monthly (twice) | Villager Communications Inc. | 60,000 | |
| Voyageur Press | McGregor | Aitkin | | Weekly (Tue.) | Voyageur Press of McGregor Inc. | 1,000 | |
| Waseca County News | Waseca | Waseca | | Weekly (Fri.) | Adams Publishing Group | 1,289 | |
| West Central Tribune | Willmar | Kandiyohi | 1895 | Wed / Sat | Forum Communications | 5,055 | |
| The Western Itasca Review | Deer River | Itasca | 1924 | Weekly | R.J. Spadafore | | |
| Whittier Globe | Whittier | Hennepin | 197? | Monthly | Citizens of Whittier | unknown | |
| Winona Daily News | Winona | Winona | 1855 | Tue / Thu / Sat | Lee Enterprises | 2,540 | |

== Defunct newspapers ==
- The Appeal (Saint Paul, Minnesota) (1889-19??)
- Bemidji Daily Pioneer (1904–1971)
- Echo de l'Ouest (Minneapolis) (1883–1929)
- Der fortschritt (New Ulm) (1891–1915)
- Gnistan, 1891–1892, Minneapolis, a Swedish-language radical, Socialist-Unitarian newspaper
- Katolik (Winona) (1893–1895)
- Minneapolis Star (1947–1982)
- Minneapolis Times
- Minneapolis Tribune
- Minnesota Posten
- New Ulm Post (New Ulm) (1864–1933)
- Northwest Commercial Bulletin (Saint Paul)
- Der Nordstern (St. Cloud) (1874–1931)
- The Progress (White Earth) (1886–1889)
- Red Lake News (Red Lake) (1912–1921)
- Minnesota Staats-Zeitung (Saint Paul) (1858–1877)
- St. Paul Dispatch (1868–1984)
- The Tomahawk (White Earth) (1903-192?)
- Twin City Commercial Bulletin
- Vinland (Minneota) (1902–1908)
- Western Appeal, then The Appeal, (Saint Paul, Minnesota) 1885–1923, St. Paul. Weekly, African-American readership
- Wiarus (Winona) (1895–1919)

== Gallery ==
Local newspapers
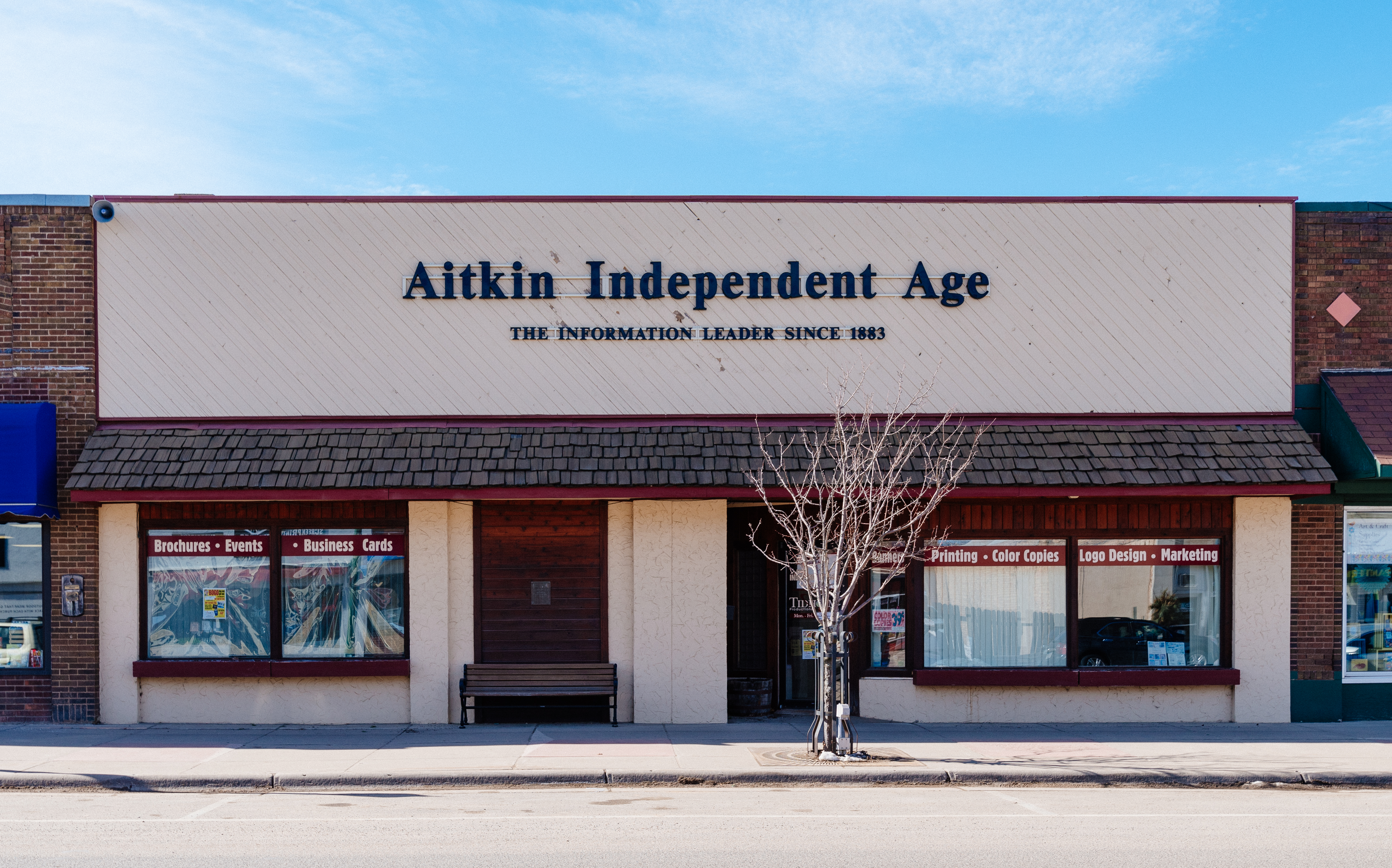
Aitkin Independent Age

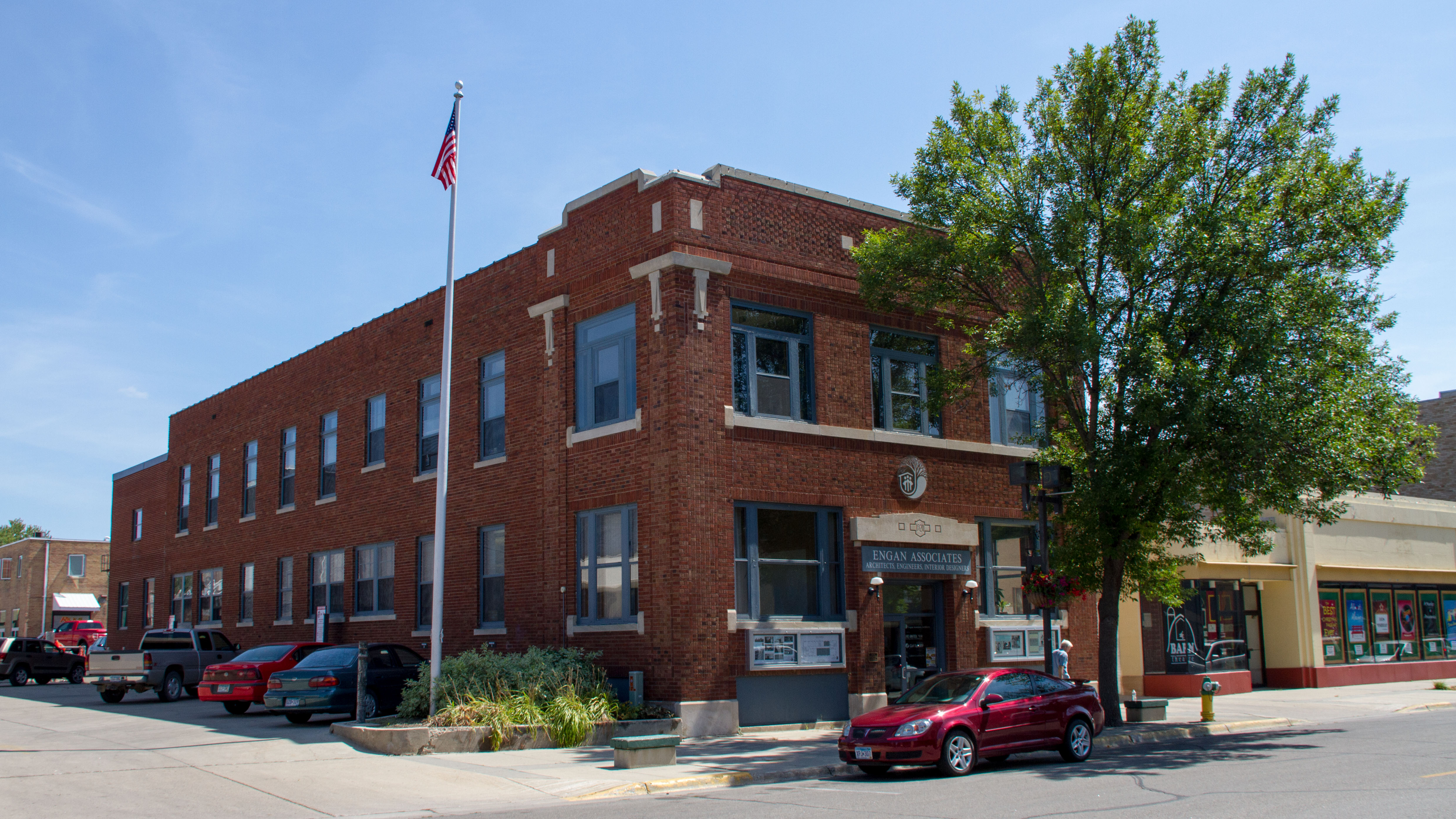
Willmar Tribune

Pine City Pioneer

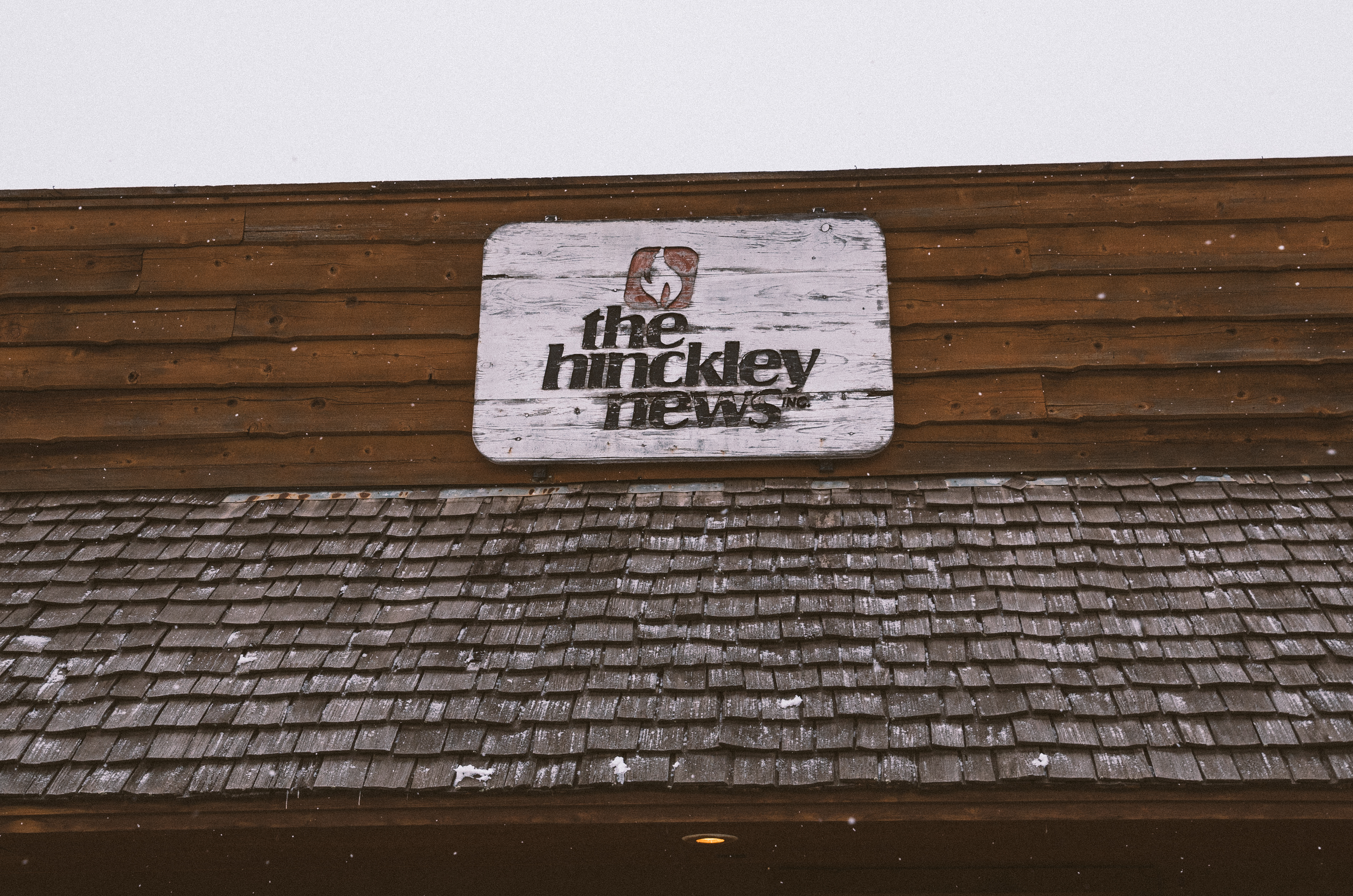
Hinckley News

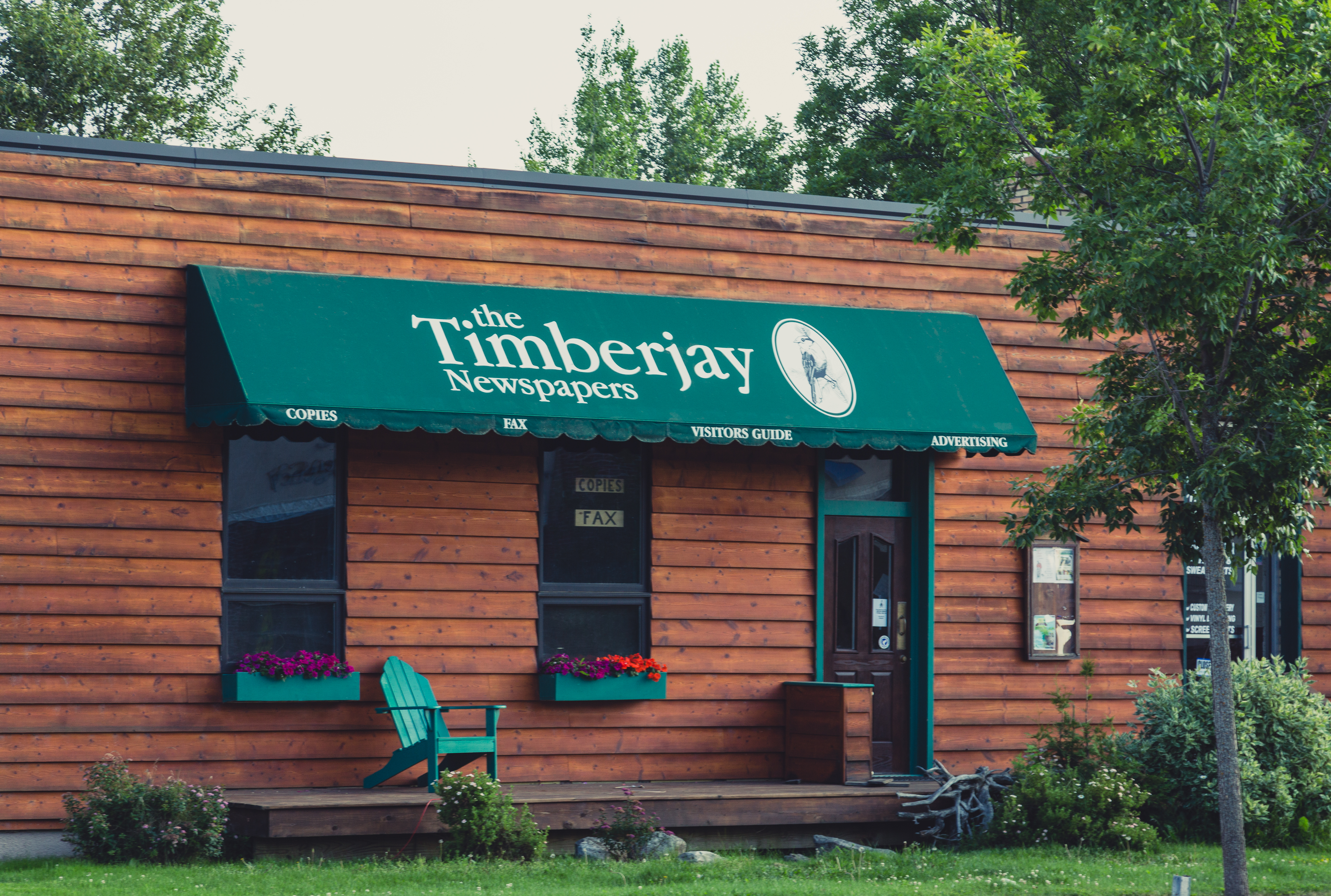
The Timberjay

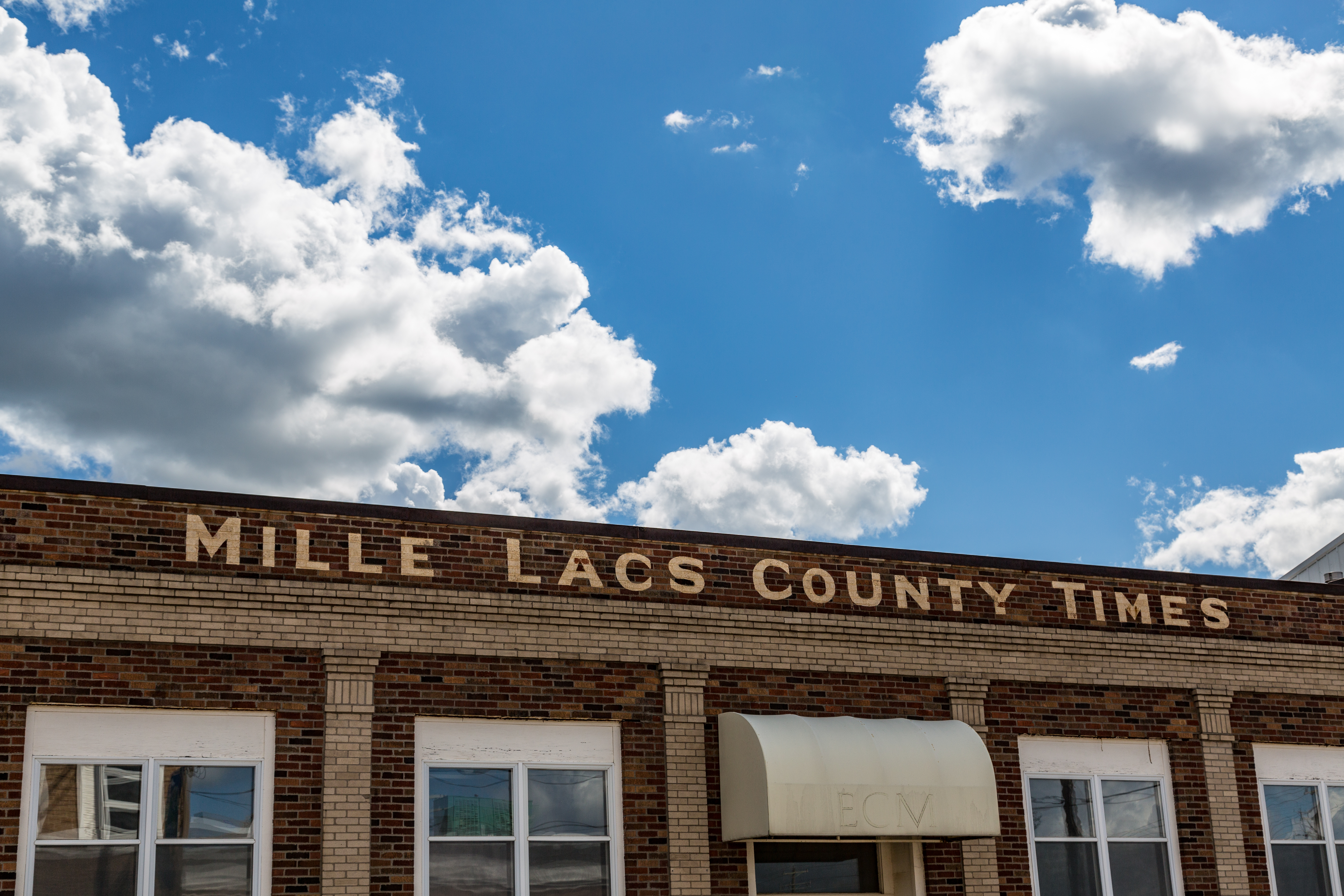
Mille Lacs County Times, now the Union-Times

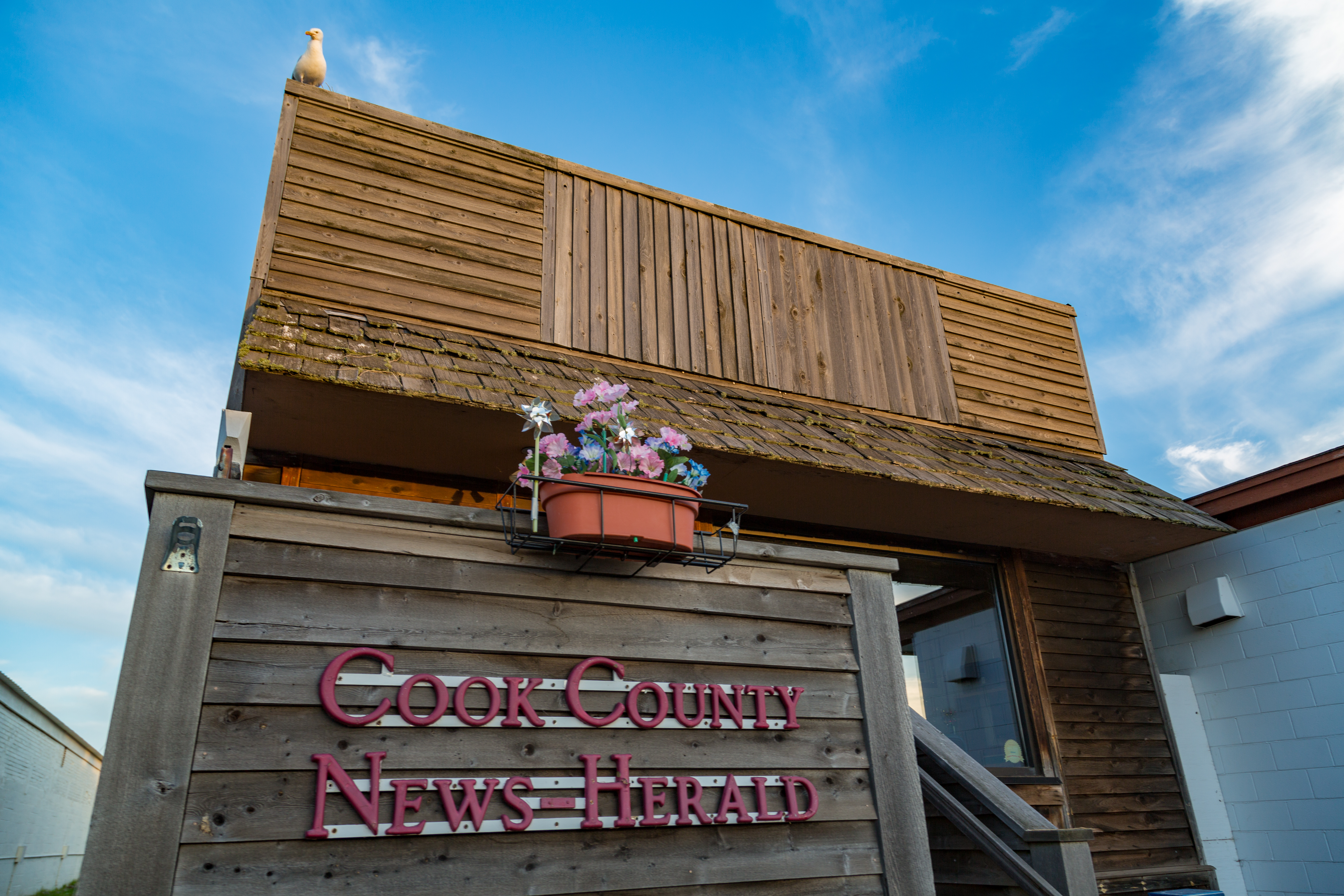
Cook County News-Herald

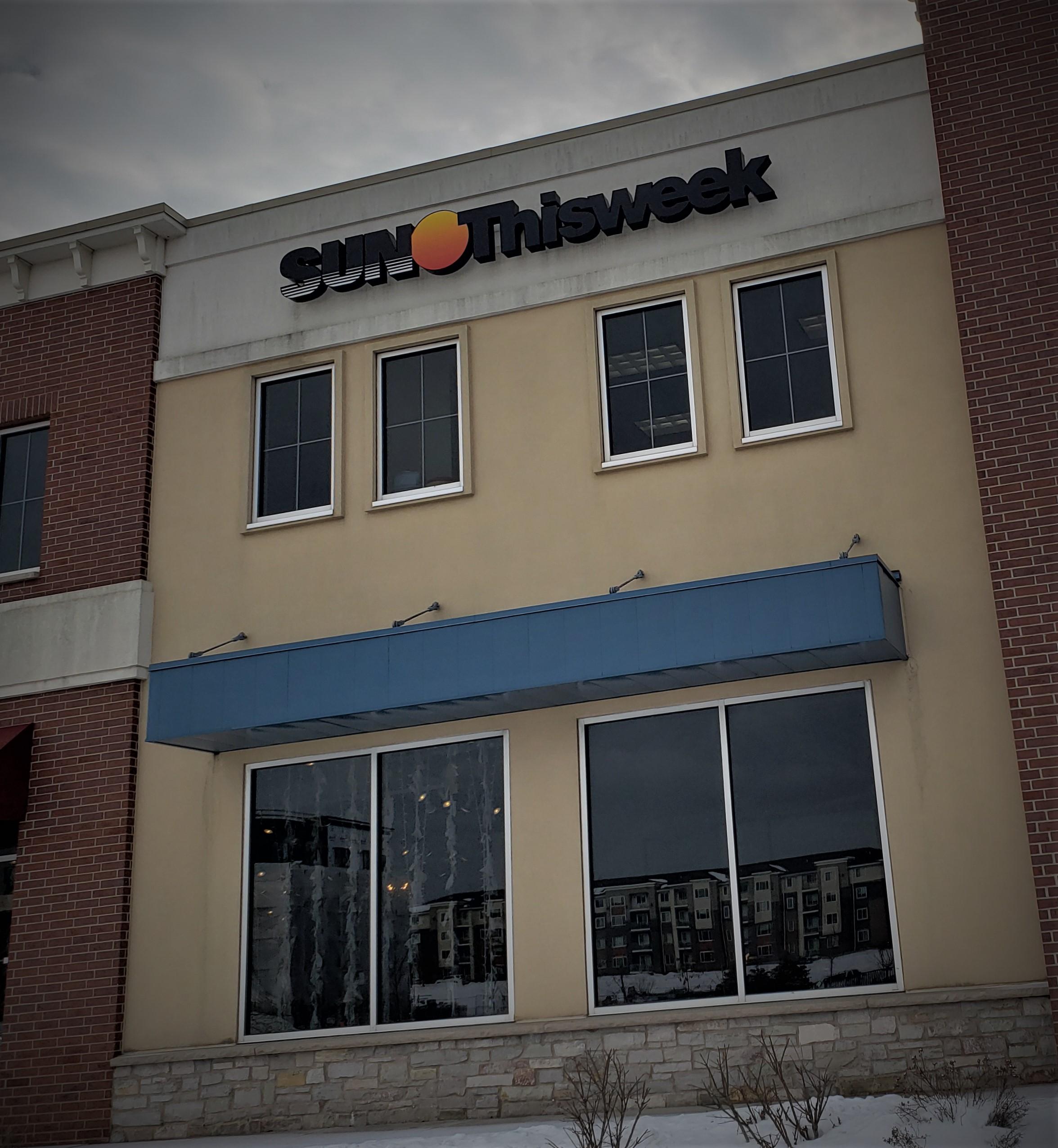
Sun ThisWeek and Dakota County Times

== College newspapers ==
- Augsburg University – The Echo
- Bemidji State University – Northern Student
- Bethany Lutheran College - The Scroll
- Bethel University – The Clarion
- Carleton College – The Carletonian
- College of Saint Benedict and Saint John's University – The Record
- Concordia College – The Concordian
- Concordia University, St. Paul - The Sword
- Gustavus Adolphus College – The Gustavian Weekly
- Hamline University – The Oracle
- Luther Seminary – The Concord
- Macalester College – The Mac Weekly
- Minnesota State University, Mankato – The Reporter
- Minnesota State University Moorhead - The Advocate
- North Central University – The Northerner
- Southwest Minnesota State University - The Spur
- St. Catherine University – The St. Catherine Wheel
- St. Cloud State University – University Chronicle
- St. Mary's University of Minnesota - The Cardinal Online
- St. Olaf College – The Manitou Messenger
- University of Minnesota Crookston - The Torch
- University of Minnesota Duluth – The Statesman
- University of Minnesota Morris – The University Register
- University of Minnesota, Twin Cities – Minnesota Daily
- University of Northwestern - St. Paul - The Northwestern Examiner
- University of St. Thomas – The Aquin, TommieMedia
- Winona State University – The Winonan

== See also ==
- List of newspapers
- List of newspapers in the United States
- List of defunct newspapers of the United States
- List of newspapers in the United States by circulation
- List of media in Minnesota
- List of radio stations in Minnesota
- List of television stations in Minnesota

== External lists ==
- Minnesota Newspaper Directory - directory of Minnesota newspapers
