= History of the Hmong in Minneapolis–Saint Paul =

Hmong population in Hennepin and Ramsey Counties, MN, with Minneapolis and St. Paul highlighted in red.

The Hmong people are a major ethnic group in the Minneapolis–Saint Paul area in the US. As of 2000, there were 40,707 ethnic Hmong in the Minneapolis-St. Paul area. The 2010 US Census stated there were 66,000 ethnic Hmong in Minneapolis-St. Paul, giving it the largest urban Hmong population in the world. According to Grit Grigoleit, author of "Coming Home? The Integration of Hmong Refugees from Wat Tham Krabok, Thailand, into American Society," the Minneapolis-St. Paul area acted as the cultural and socio-political center of Hmong life in the U.S.

== History ==
The Hmong people settled in the Minneapolis–Saint Paul area as refugees from Southeast Asia. Many had fought alongside the United States during the Vietnam War, helping U.S. forces combat communist movements in Laos. After the war, the communist government targeted the Hmong, forcing tens of thousands to flee their homes. Most crossed the Mekong River into Thailand, where many lived in refugee camps, such as Ban Vinai.

The first wave of Hmong refugees began arriving in the United States in the mid-to-late 1970s. The U.S. government scattered these refugees across the country to help with their integration. Many settled in the Midwest, including Minnesota, although the climate and landscape were very different from their previous homes. The Refugee Act of 1980 brought a second wave of Hmong immigrants. This law improved support for housing and employment for refugees. Many Hmong settled in Minnesota due to employment opportunities, social support systems and family reunifications.

Voluntary agencies, also called VOLAGS, played a key role in Hmong resettlement in Minnesota. Organizations such as Lutheran Social Service, Catholic Charities, and World Relief Minnesota helped refugees with housing and basic needs, including training in English and job skills during their first months in the state. Minnesota had many active VOLAGS making it a hub for new arrivals.

In the early 1980s, the University of Minnesota Agricultural Extension Services and the Lao Family Community started farming programs to help Hmong refugees develop agricultural skills. These programs ran until 1985.

By 2004, St. Paul Mayor Randy Kelly visited Thailand with mostly Hmong professionals and educators to inspect refugee communities there. The area was expected to receive more refugees from the Wat Tham Krabok camp in 2006.

In the Midwest at large, Hmong represent more than 35% of the Southeast Asian population. The Hmong community in Minneapolis–Saint Paul has since grown to be the largest urban Hmong population in the United States, numbering more than 94,000. The community holds strong family and clan ties, which are important in Hmong culture. Many Hmong have become leaders and professionals. For example, Mee Moua served in the Minnesota Legislature, and gymnast Suni Lee won an Olympic gold medal in 2021.

== Demographics ==
Data has shown a negative trend in the number of Hmong-American households that are considered to be living in poverty. In 2015, data from the Pew Research Center stated that 28.3% of all Hmong-American households lived in poverty. This trend is also reflected in Minnesotan Hmong communities. The 2011 American Community Survey report stated that 31% of Hmong in the state of Minnesota were considered to be in poverty. According to the 2000 U.S. census data, 33% of Hmong people in Minnesota were considered to be in poverty. According to the 1990 U.S. census data, 65% of Hmong people in Minnesota were considered to be in poverty.

In 2013, Mai Na Lee, the author of an encyclopedia article titled "Hmong of Minnesota and California," wrote that despite a lack of official statistics, “there are reputedly many Hmong millionaires in the Twin Cities.”

As of 2013, over 50% of Hmong in the Minneapolis are homeowners.

== Commerce ==
As of around 2013, the Hmong businesses in the Minneapolis-St. Paul area had revenues of over $100 million total.

As of 2011, several Hmong-owned businesses are located along West University Avenue in St. Paul.

Hmongtown Marketplace, a complex with more than 200 merchant stalls and a Hmong food court, opened in 2004. Nine businesspeople developed a similar complex named Hmong Village in 2009.

In 2012, McDonald's introduced its first Hmong language advertising in the United States at a restaurant in Minneapolis. However, it was unintelligible to Hmong speakers.

== Institutions ==
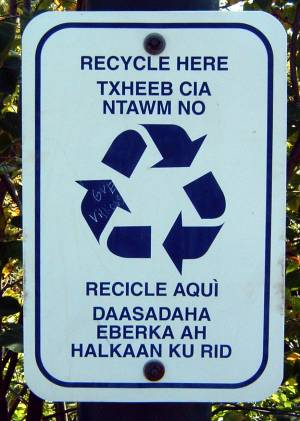
A recycling sign in Minnesota with instructions in Hmong and other languages.

By 2013, there were about ten Hmong nonprofit organizations in St. Paul.

The largest Hmong nonprofit group in the State of Minnesota is the Hmong American Partnership (HAP), headquartered in St. Paul. Founded in 1990, HAP is led by a board of up to 10 members. However, over the past few years, the group has experienced continual problems with financial oversight, which “appears to be both widespread and symptomatic of larger management struggles within HAP.” The problems were uncovered in a 2018 audit, and included issues such as: persistent mismanagement of employee retirement accounts, failures to “provide services laid out in grant descriptions,” undisclosed revenue sources on submitted IRS forms, and “less than forthright financial practices.” Bao Vang, HAP's president and CEO who earned a base salary of $243,000 in 2017, defended her organization's practices—despite the budgetary controversies.

The Lao Family Community, headquartered in St. Paul, is the most established and oldest Hmong organization. Younger leaders began to leave the organization in the 1990s as a result of political disagreements. Mai M. Na Lee wrote that the organization “continues to monopolize festival events like the New Year's Festival and the Fourth of July Soccer Tournament.” She added that it is “not without scandal.”

The Center for Hmong Arts and Talents (CHAT), based in St. Paul, develops Hmong art and literature.

The Hmong Cultural Center is also in St. Paul.

=== Cultural Organizations ===
The Hmong Cultural Center is a primary cultural organization dedicated to promoting Hmong arts, music, dance, and ceremonial traditions. It offers classes on the Qeej musical instrument, Hmong dances, and traditional marriage and funeral songs. The center includes the Hmong Resource Center Library, which houses one of the most comprehensive collections of Hmong literature and multimedia in North America. The center also hosts a museum that showcases Hmong history and cultural heritage through exhibits, interactive displays, and community programs that elevate awareness and pride in Hmong culture.

The Hmong Museum in Saint Paul, Minnesota, founded in 2015, is the first U.S. museum devoted to Hmong history, arts, and culture. After years of community programming, it opened a gallery in 2023 featuring rotating exhibits, educational events, and a shop showcasing Hmong artists.

The Center for Hmong Arts & Talent (CHAT) is another cultural hub supporting Hmong artists and youth through programs in dance, music, and visual arts, as well as leadership development. CHAT fosters cultural preservation while empowering the community socially and artistically.

=== Educational Organizations ===
The Center for Hmong Studies at Concordia University in Saint Paul promotes academic research, education, and public awareness about Hmong history and culture. It organizes conferences, exhibitions, and community events that connect scholars, students, and residents. The center serves as an important resource for preserving Hmong heritage through education and scholarship.

The Hmong College Prep Academy provides a bilingual educational environment with an emphasis on Hmong language and culture alongside mainstream curriculum. Public schools in the area, such as the Saint Paul Public Schools’ Txuj Ci program, support Hmong language and cultural education for K-12 students.

=== Social Service Organizations ===
The Hmong American Partnership works to support the social and economic well-being of the Hmong community. It delivers services including workforce development, health initiatives, and family support aimed at helping immigrants and refugees integrate and thrive in Minnesota.

The Hmong Cultural Center also provides free English as a Second Language (ESL) classes, citizenship training, and career advising, playing a role in helping newcomers adjust to life in the United States.

The Hmong Health Care Professionals Coalition (HHCPC), founded in 1995, is a group of Hmong health workers in St. Paul. The coalition works to improve health care for the Hmong community by offering education, health screenings, and research. It helps connect Western health providers with Hmong patients to provide better care. HHCPC also organizes health fairs and programs focused on issues like stroke awareness and maternity care.

== Politics ==
When Choua Lee began serving as a member of the board of education of Saint Paul Public Schools in 1991, she became the first Hmong-American elected to public office in the area. The second official, Neal Thao, took Choua Lee's position in 1995. Neal Thao remained in this seat for seven years.

In 2000, Aly Xiong, a human rights activist and school principal, was the first Hmong-American to run for a Minnesota State Legislative seat, District 67B. He lost to State Representative Sheldon Johnson, who served the east side of St. Paul for 20 years.

The Hmong Veterans' Naturalization Act of 2000 increased the number of Hmong eligible to vote, giving them more political power. In 2002, Cy Thao was elected to the Minnesota House of Representatives for District 65A and Mee Moua was elected to the Minnesota Senate for District 67.

The third Hmong-American to be elected to the St. Paul school board, Kazoua Kong-Thao, was elected in 2003. Mee Moua's sister, Vallay Moua Varro, was elected to the St. Paul school board in 2009. This was the first time that two Hmong officials served concurrently on the St. Paul school board, since Kong-Thao was still in office. In 2013 Dai Thao defeated Kazoua Kong-Thao and six other candidates in a special election to become the first St. Paul City Councilmember of Hmong descent.

Mai M. Na Lee wrote circa 2013 that the Hmong have a significant political influence in St. Paul due to the size of the population. Beginning around 2000 Minnesotans campaigning for office have visited Hmong events to get the Hmong vote.

== Media ==
The Hmong Today and Hmong Times, two Hmong newspapers, are headquartered in the Twin Cities area.

== Education ==
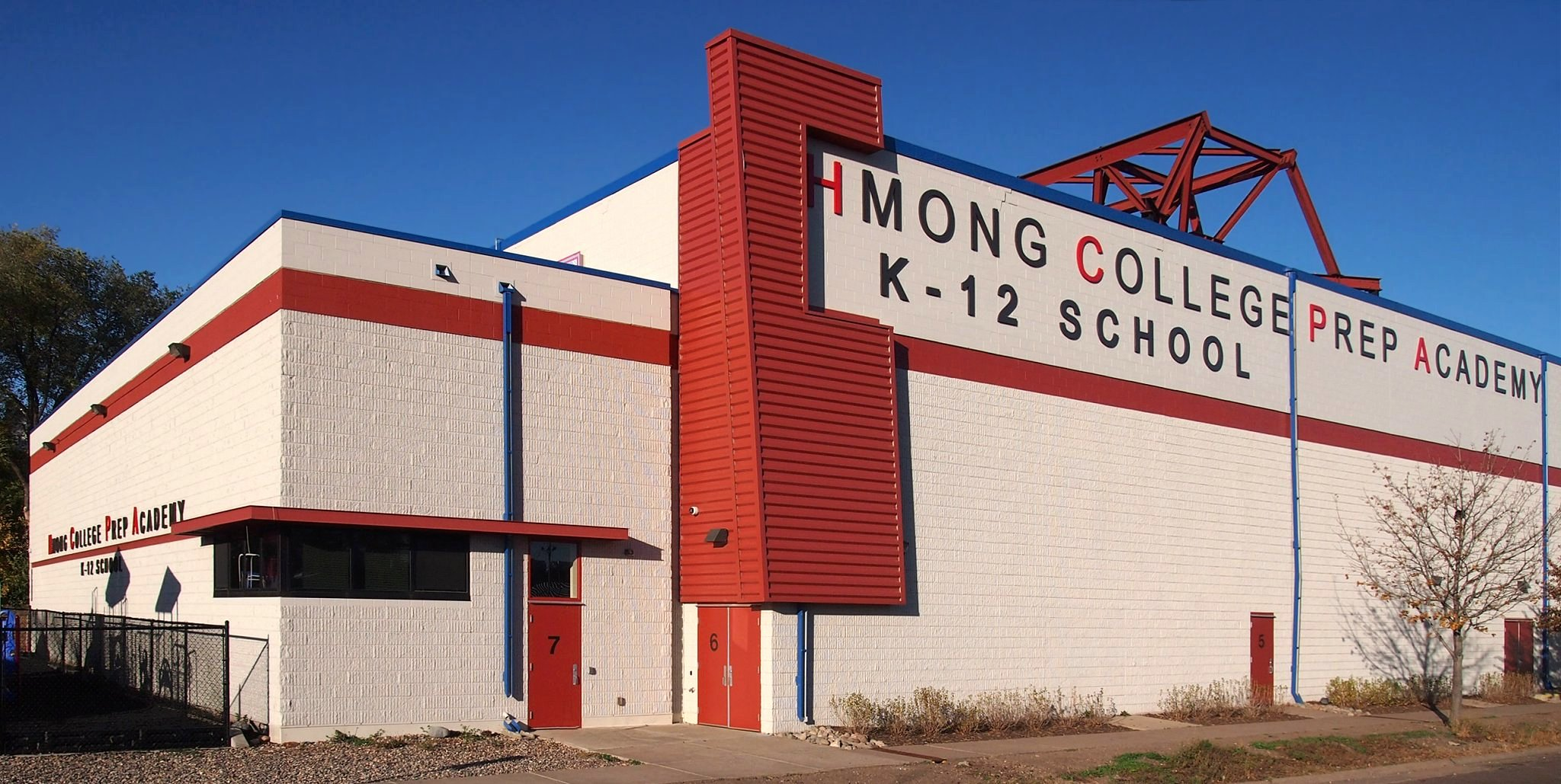
Hmong College Prep Academy's west wing

As of 2000, statistics showed that 24% of Minnesotan Hmong had attained a high school diploma or its equivalent, 8% had a bachelor's degree and/or an associate degree, and 1% had a master's degree or further education. A reported 53% of Hmong in Minnesota had never received an education.

According to recorded enrollment data, the State of Minnesota had 22,000 students of Hmong origins. Minneapolis Public Schools and St. Paul Public Schools have large concentrations of Hmong students.

Minneapolis Public Schools operates the Hmong International Academy, a PreK–8 school catering to the Hmong community. There are additional Hmong-centric schools, such as the Hmong College Prep Academy, a K–12 charter school in Saint Paul. There is also the Hope Community Academy, a K–8 school located in Saint Paul that is open to all students, but has a focus on Hmong language and culture.

By 2011, increasing numbers of Hmong were attending universities and colleges. Many Hmong student associations have been formed within area universities and college campuses.

== Culture and recreation ==
Xees Phaus (or Xees Phos) is the Hmong name for Saint Paul, the city that has become the center of Hmong culture in the United States.

In Minneapolis, the Hmong New Year is celebrated in the metropolitan area. The 38th annual Hmong New Year in St. Paul was held in 2013.

The 41st Annual Minnesota Hmong New Year will be celebrated through the dates of November 30, 2020 to December 1, 2020 at the River Center in Saint Paul, Minnesota.

Due to the farming programs established in the 1980s, many Minnesotan Hmong had gained an interest in farming and agriculture.

Pom Siab Hmoob (Gazing into the Heart of the Hmong) Theatre, which is reportedly the world's first Hmong theater group, was formed in 1990. It is based in the Twin Cities. It is now known as the Center for Hmong Arts and Talent (CHAT).

The film Gran Torino by Clint Eastwood, filmed in Michigan, stars five Minnesotan Hmong Americans, and the original story was based on a neighborhood in Minneapolis. It was the first mainstream U.S. film to feature Hmong Americans.

== Notable people ==
- Mee Moua (Minnesota state senator) – Elected in 2002.
- Cy Thao (Minnesota state representative) – Elected in 2002.
- Foung Hawj (Minnesota state senator) – Elected in 2012.
- Bee Vang (actor) – Starred in Gran Torino.
- Fong Lee – Fatally shot by a Minneapolis police officer in 2006.
- Sunisa Lee (gymnast) – 2x Olympic Gold Medalist
- Tou Thao (police officer) – Involved in the murder of George Floyd.

== See also ==
- History of Somalis in Minneapolis–Saint Paul

== Notes ==
- Some material originates from this revision of Hmong American
