= Minnesota Staats-Zeitung =

Weekly newspaper in Saint Paul, Minnesota, US

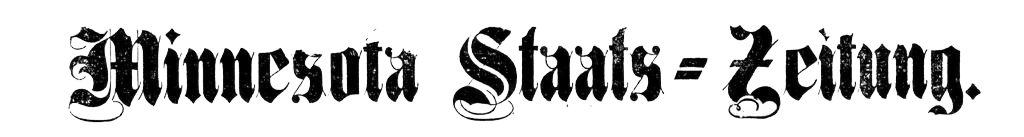

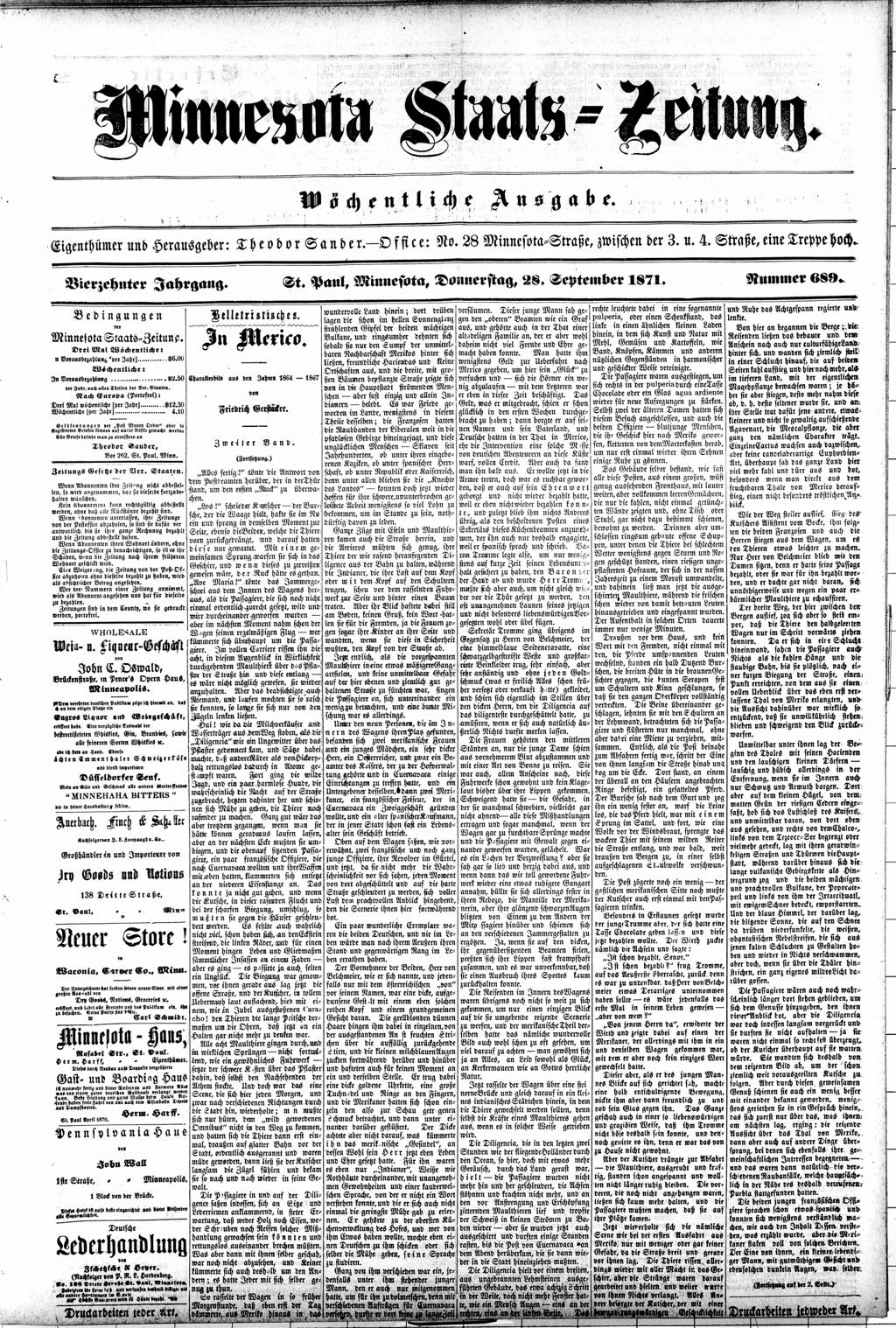
- The September 28, 1871, front page of the Minnesota Staats-Zeitung
- Type: Weekly newspaper
- Format: Broadsheet
- Owner(s): Samuel Gottlieb Ludvigh (1858–1864); Charles Reuther (1864–1864); Andrew Robert Kiefer (1864)
- Publisher: Charles Reuther; Christian Exel
- Editor: Albert Wolff (1860–1893)
- Founded: July 24, 1858
- Ceased publication: 1877 (merged with the Minnesota Volksblatt)
- Political alignment: Republican Party
- Language: German
- Headquarters: Saint Paul, Minnesota; United States
- City: Saint Paul, Minnesota
- Country: United States
- ISSN: 2372-8647
- OCLC number: 1713829

The Minnesota Staats-Zeitung (English: Minnesota State Newspaper), formerly Die Minnesota Deutsche Zeitung, was a German Republican newspaper based in Saint Paul, Minnesota, United States from 1858 to 1877. The newspaper has its origins as Die Minnesota Deutsche Zeitung (The Minnesota German Newspaper) in 1855 which was Minnesota's first newspaper printed in the German language. In 1877 the Staats-Zeitung merged with the Minnesota Volksblatt (Minnesota People's Journal) and was renamed the Wöchentliche Volkszeitung (Weekly People's Newspaper) in 1881.

== History ==
=== Die Minnesota Deutsche Zeitung ===
By 1855 the largest ethnic group living in Minnesota besides English-speaking Americans from the East Coast of the United States were German Americans. The surge in German immigration to Minnesota Territory justified the printing of a newspaper in the German language. The first newspaper to be printed in the German language in Minnesota was Die Minnesota Deutsche Zeitung (The Minnesota German Newspaper) which began under Friedrich Orthwein, a German immigrant from Milwaukee. Die Minnesota Deutsche Zeitung was an independent German Democratic newspaper which was largely funded by local notable German Democrat politicians. In 1856 Orthwein became in trouble with his investors and his newspaper was confiscated and suspended. In 1856 the Deutsche Zeitung's ownership was transferred to Charles Duncan Gilfillan, a local Republican politician and the chairman of the Minnesota Republican Central Committee.

=== Minnesota Staats-Zeitung ===
By 1858 a local freethinker, German writer, and forty-eighter, Samuel Gottlieb Ludvigh, began to promote his quarterly, Die Fackel (the Torch), to Republican printers and the German-speaking community in Saint Paul. Gilfillan, impressed by Ludvigh's writings and political leanings, offered Ludvigh to take over the Zeitung as the newspaper's editor and publisher. Ludvigh began work on the Zeitung immediately and changed the name to the Minnesota Staats-Zeitung. To assist Ludvigh in publishing the newspaper Charles Reuther and Christian Exel were hired on as the newspapers publishers, while Albert Wolff was hired as the newspaper's editor. Wolff was a forty-eighter, a republican, and an ardent supporter of the German revolutions of 1848–1849. Wolff also had extensive newspaper experience, including having worked previously for Die Minnesota Deutsche Zeitung.

The first issue of the Minnesota Staats-Zeitung was published on July 24, 1858. The Staats-Zeitung was released on a weekly basis, typically on Sundays as a four-paged, seven-column weekly newspaper. The Staats-Zeitung typically covered local, national, and international news including politics, the American Civil War, the Dakota War of 1862, local elections, and advocated for the interests of German American immigrants in Hennepin County and Ramsey County as the newspaper was headquartered in Saint Paul. After the 1860 United States presidential election the newspaper identified heavily with the Republican Party of Minnesota and abolitionism, despite the newspaper being a previous advocate and sponsored by the Minnesota Democratic Party. In 1866 Theodor Sander joined the publishing team at the Staats-Zeitung and assisted Wolff in expanding the Staats-Zeitung into a four-paged, six-columned tri-weekly newspaper edition under the same name.

=== Post 1877 ===
In 1877 the Staats-Zeitung merged with another Minnesota newspaper, the Minnesota Volksblatt (Minnesota People's Journal) which was founded in 1856 and became the Wöchentliche Volkszeitung (Weekly People's Newspaper) in 1881. A March 13, 1877 print of the Luxemburger Gazette out of Dubuque, Iowa states "The democratic "Volksblatt" and the republican "Minnesota Staats-zeitung" of St. Paul have merged. The product of this merger is to be a daily German-language newspaper with a Republican orientation". The Wöchentliche Volkszeitung would see continued printing from previous publishers including Albert Wolff until his death in 1893. Other German newspapers in Minnesota, such as Der Nordstern, would see continued printing in Minnesota well into the Great Depression. Following both World War I and World War II German newspapers fell out of favor in Minnesota for other titles in the English language, such as the popular St. Paul Pioneer Press and the Minnesota Star Tribune.

== Notable staff ==
- Andrew Robert Kiefer: American Civil War veteran and local Minnesota Republican politician. Kiefer purchased Charles Reuther and Christian Exel's interests in the Staats-Zeitung in 1864. Kiefer served as one of the paper's joint-owners after 1864.

== See also ==
- List of newspapers published in Minnesota
- German Americans
