= Hmong Today =

National newspapers published in the United States

- The nation's Hmong newspaper
- Front page excerpt of edition 209 for December 2021
- Native name: Xov-Xwm Hmoob
- Founder: Sang Mouacheupao
- Publisher: Sang Moua
- President: Sy Vang
- Launched: January 1, 2004; 22 years ago
- Language: English; Hmong
- City: Saint Paul, Minnesota
- Country: United States of America
- Circulation: 10,000 (as of 2004)
- OCLC number: 56430365

Hmong Today (Xov-Xwm Hmoob) is an American nationwide newspaper documenting the news and culture of the Hmong American community. It is published biweekly and based in St. Paul, Minnesota. Because Hmong typically only read English, articles are usually in English.

== Description ==
Hmong Today publishes a biweekly print newspaper reporting on Hmong American and global Hmong news stories, especially about Saint Paul, Minnesota, the paper's headquarters and the largest concentration of Hmong in the United States. Founder Wameng Moua manages most aspects of the paper. Because Hmong typically only read English, articles are usually in English, and rarely in Hmong.

Along with Hmong Times, Hmong Today has been called one of the Hmong community's "most enduring publications".

The publisher of the newspaper is Sang Moua and the president of the company is Sy Vang. Wameng Moua and Sang Mouacheupao founded Hmong Today in 2003 and published the first issue January 1, 2004. The website was developed and administered by Hmongmedia.

== History ==
Sang Mouacheupao and Wameng Moua co-founded Hmong Today in 2003. Owners of Hmong Times Dick and Steve Wetzler offered to sell their half-share in Hmong Times to Moua in 2003 for US$200,000, which Moua declined. A white businessman had implied that Hmong couldn't run a paper without the aid of white people, so Moua and Mouacheupao started the paper on their own.

The front-page story of the first volume and edition was about Hmong in Laos facing ongoing persecution after the Laotian Civil War. Entitled "Betrayal, Lost Hope, And the Forgotten Tribe" and written by Wameng Moua, it was published December 31, 2003. Hmong scholar Her Vang reports: "Moua had dedicated many volumes and editions of Hmong Today to the plight of the Hmong in Laos."

Around 2001 Kathy Mouacheupao joined the paper writing for the arts and entertainment section. Kathy is co-founder Wameng Moua's sister and at the time had recently become staff at Center for Hmong Arts and Talent.

Copies of Hmong Today with the headline about the 2007 murder of Cha Vang were distributed at his funeral.

== Awards ==
At the Ethnic and Community Media Awards in 2008, Wameng Moua received honors for stories in two categories.

== Staff and leadership ==
=== Leadership ===
- Sang Moua, publisher
- Sy Vang, president
- Sang Mouacheupao, founder

=== Contributors ===
- Kathy Mouacheupao
- Wameng Moua

== Archives ==
Hmong Today is archived in multiple formats at several archives.

In 2022, print archives of Hmong Today were included in an expansion of the Hmong Cultural Center Museum in Saint Paul, Minnesota.

Online archives of hmongtoday.com (OCLC 647963146) are available at the Minnesota Historical Society, Wisconsin Historical Society, and University of California, Irvine. The Hmong Today website went offline in 2012.

Select stories were republished via local outlets such as Twin Cities Daily Planet.

== See also ==
- Hmong Times
- History of the Hmong in Minneapolis–Saint Paul
- List of newspapers in Minnesota
