= KDWA =

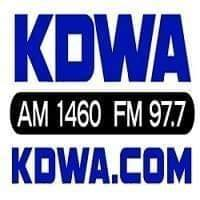
- Hastings, Minnesota; United States
- Frequency: 1460 kHz
- Branding: KDWA AM 1460/FM 97.7

Programming
- Format: Talk/Personality
- Affiliations: USA Radio Network

Ownership
- Owner: K & M Broadcasting, Inc.
- Sister stations: KQPR

History
- First air date: October 24, 1963

Technical information
- Licensing authority: FCC
- Facility ID: 32986
- Class: D
- Power: 1,000 watts day 41 watts night
- Transmitter coordinates: 44°44′14″N 92°49′42″W
- Translator: 97.7 W249DK (Hastings)

Links
- Public license information: Public file; LMS
- Webcast: Listen Live
- Website: kdwa.com

KDWA (1460 AM/97.7 FM) is a radio station broadcasting a hyperlocal News/Talk format, licensed to Hastings, Minnesota. The station is currently owned by K & M Broadcasting, Inc. and features national news programming from the USA Radio Network at the top of each hour. Locally, KDWA is especially known for its coverage of local news and high school sports for both Hastings and Prescott.

== History ==
KDWA began broadcasting on October 24, 1963. It was founded by John McKane, a former editor for the Hastings Star Gazette. The station's first news director, Dave Baudoin, became the majority co-owner in 1968.

In 1971, KDWA was allowed to broadcast at night, at a reduced wattage output. Previously, the station (like many AM stations at the time) would sign on at sunrise and sign off at sunset.

In 1991, Dan Massman bought the station for $150,000. The following year, he moved it to its current location on Highway 61 in downtown Hastings.

While KDWA is primarily a talk station, a weekly Top 40/EDM show was DJ'd by Reggie Bauer beginning in 2011 and ending in 2015. Bauer later went on to work as a manager for KDWA's sister station, Power 96 in Albert Lea, Minnesota.

On March 25, 2016, KDWA began simulcasting on an FM translator at 97.9 MHz. However, on May 4 they moved down to 97.7 to avoid interference with a low-power station in Lakeville.
