= Winona Daily News =

Daily newspaper in Winona, Minnesota

Coordinates: 44.047215°N 91.612526°W

- Type: Daily newspaper
- Format: Broadsheet
- Owner: Lee Enterprises
- Editor: Todd Krysiak
- Founded: 1855; 171 years ago (as the Winona Republican)
- Language: American English
- Headquarters: 902 E. 2nd St. Suite 261; Winona, MN 55987 United States
- City: Winona
- Country: United States
- Circulation: 1,927 Daily (as of 2023)
- ISSN: 0273-9941
- OCLC number: 1696879
- Website: winonadailynews.com

The Winona Daily News is a daily newspaper serving Winona, Minnesota and the surrounding area. Founded in 1855, it is the second-oldest continually running newspaper in the state. The paper is owned by Lee Enterprises. The paper has print editions on Tuesdays, Thursdays, and Saturdays, along with online editions every day.

== History ==
The Daily News was known as the Republican Herald until 1954. It shares some of the same production staff and pressing facilities as La Crosse Tribune since 1999; the presses are located in Madison, Wisconsin.

Starting June 6, 2023, the print edition of the newspaper will be reduced to three days a week: Tuesday, Thursday and Saturday. Also, the newspaper will transition from being delivered by a traditional newspaper delivery carrier to mail delivery by the U.S. Postal Service.

== Notable staff ==
- Al Sheehan, reporter and theater critic

== See also ==
- List of newspapers in Minnesota
