= Owatonna People's Press =

Coordinates: 44.086574°N 93.227529°W

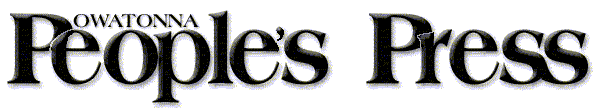
- People's Press logo
- Type: Daily newspaper
- Format: Print (4 days a week)
- Owner: Adams Publishing Group
- Publisher: Kevin True
- Founded: 1874
- Language: American English
- Headquarters: 135 W Pearl St Owatonna, Minnesota United States
- City: Owatonna
- Country: United States
- Circulation: 2,962 (as of 2024)
- ISSN: 0890-2860
- OCLC number: 1776134
- Website: owatonna.com

The Owatonna People's Press is a four-day daily newspaper serving Owatonna, Minnesota and surrounding communities and is considered the paper of record for Steele County. The Owatonna Area Shopper is also published in and around Owatonna.

== History ==
The People's Press was founded on September 2, 1874 by Benjamin E. Darby as a weekly four-page paper.

Darby served as newspaper editor for 65 years, from 1874 until 1939.

The first issue of the Press, which predated public lighting in Owatanna, included a lengthy recounting of a county convention that nominated candidates for various county offices.

The paper was expanded to ten pages of news and advertising in 1900 when railroad lines began intersecting Owatonna.

Darby added a daily edition in 1916 named the Daily People's Press and discontinued the weekly edition in 1921.

In 1938, Darby bought and consolidated the Steele County pioneer weekly Owatonna Journal-Chronicle to the Press.

In 1969, the name of the paper was officially changed to the Owatonna People's Press.

== Publishers ==
The Owatonna People's Press is published by Adams Publishing Group Inc. based out of Coon Rapids, Minnesota and printed in Princeton, Minnesota.

Once a morning daily, the People's Press reduced its frequency to four days a week in February 2021, and transitioned to an afternoon delivery schedule and regionalized coverage.

== See also ==
- List of newspapers in Minnesota
