= The Journal (New Ulm) =

Daily American newspaper

Coordinates: 44.316693°N 94.462132°W

- Type: Daily newspaper
- Owner: Ogden Newspapers
- Publisher: Greg Orear
- Editor: Kevin Sweeney
- Headquarters: 303 N. Minnesota; New Ulm, MN 56073
- City: New Ulm
- Country: United States
- Circulation: 4,680 (as of 2024)
- ISSN: 1059-1338
- OCLC number: 1589813
- Website: nujournal.com

The Journal is an American, English language daily newspaper serving New Ulm, Minnesota.

== See also ==
- List of newspapers in Minnesota
