= KQPR =

Radio station in Albert Lea, Minnesota

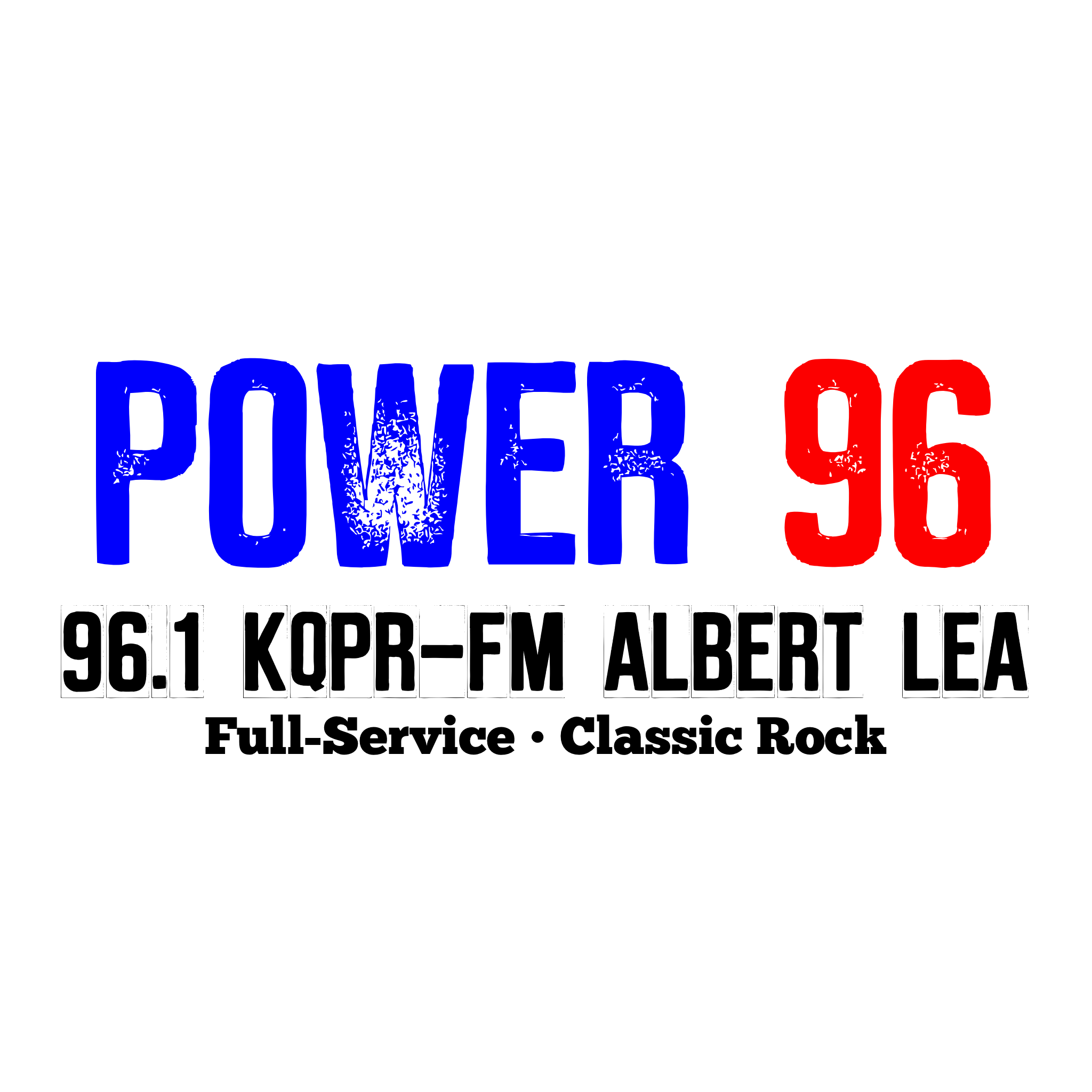
- Albert Lea, Minnesota; United States
- Broadcast area: Albert Lea-Austin
- Frequency: 96.1 MHz
- Branding: Power 96

Programming
- Format: Classic rock
- Affiliations: Minnesota Vikings Radio Network; Linder Farm Network; Austin Bruins Media Network

Ownership
- Owner: Daniel and Barbara Massman; (D&Z Media, LLC)
- Sister stations: KDWA

History
- First air date: August 14, 1989
- Call sign meaning: Power 96

Technical information
- Licensing authority: FCC
- Facility ID: 54473
- Class: C3
- ERP: 25,000 watts
- HAAT: 94 meters (308 ft)
- Transmitter coordinates: 43.616°N 93.213°W

Links
- Public license information: Public file; LMS
- Webcast: Listen Live
- Website: kqprfm.com

KQPR (96.1 FM, "Power 96") is a radio station broadcasting a classic rock/full service format. Licensed to Albert Lea, Minnesota, United States, the station serves the Albert Lea-Austin area. The station is currently owned by Daniel and Barbara Massman, through licensee D&Z Media, LLC.

== History ==
KQPR first went on the air on August 14, 1989. Sometime in the 1990s, it became a satellite station of KQCL, which originates out of Faribault.

On December 13, 2001, KQPR began broadcasting independently again from its own studios in Albert Lea, its city of license.

On March 29, 2004, KQPR increased its effective radiated power from 5,000 to 25,000 watts.

In August 2018, it was announced that Hometown Broadcasting was selling KQPR to D&Z Media. The official transfer of ownership was effective on January 2, 2019. Operations Manager Reggie Bauer was brought in with the new ownership, having previously worked for KDWA (the other station owned by Massman) as a teenager. After Reggie departed, programming an operations were picked up by long time Program Director and Operations Manager Ron Hunter-Budrik. Ron has been part of KQPR for over 22 years. Long time morning host Jay Paul resigned and Ron was moved into the morning slot focusing on more music and community leader interviews.
