= Sun Current newspapers =

Newspapers in Minnesota

The Sun Current are a series of newspapers that are or have been published in Minnesota. As of 2023, two surviving newspapers were edited by Sun Current Newspapers of Eden Prairie, Minnesota, a subsidiary of Adams Publishing Group.

== Historical newspapers ==
As of 2017, according to the Minnesota Newspaper Association, the titles included:

• Bloomington Sun Current. Published weekly since before 1994, publication subsequently ceased in November 2018, when it merged with the Richfield Sun Current to form the Bloomington-Richfield Sun Current. The paper was originally published in Bloomington, but later the editorial moved to Eden Prairie. As of 2023, the Minnesota History Center maintained a set of archives of the issues of the Bloomington Sun Current, as did the Bloomington Historical Society at its Old Town Hall Museum.

• Eden Prairie Sun Current. Publication began in September 2002 and ceased in August 2019, when it merged with the Sun Sailor. In its final year the paper was reported to have an average run of 3134 copies. As of 2023, The Minnesota History Center maintained a set of archives of its issues.

• Edina Sun Current, published weekly as of 2023. The paper has been published since July 16, 1984.

• Richfield Sun Current. Publication ceased in 2018 when it merged with the Bloomington Sun Current to form the Bloomington-Richfield Sun Current.

The Edina Sun-Current, Eden Prairie Sun-Current, and Richfield Sun-Current were all distributed in print media and were considered part of the Twin Cities Metro Area market.

== Current newspapers ==
As of early 2023, Adams Publishing Group claimed current publication of:

• Bloomington-Richfield Sun Current, published weekly in Eden Prairie since December 2018, resulting from the merger of the Richfield Sun Current and the Bloomington Sun Current; and publication of the aforementioned Edina Sun Current.

== Circulation ==
As of 2023, the editorial claimed over 20,000 readers of the Sun Current newspapers. On its July 2019 report, the Minnesota Newspaper Association reported over 3,000 readers for the Eden Prairie Sun Current, over 6,000 for the Edina Sun Current, and over 11,000 for the Bloomington-Richfield Sun Current.

In March 2024, Sun Current announced it was switching to a paid subscription model.
