= Hmong College Prep Academy =

Coordinates: 44°58′30″N 93°9′51″W

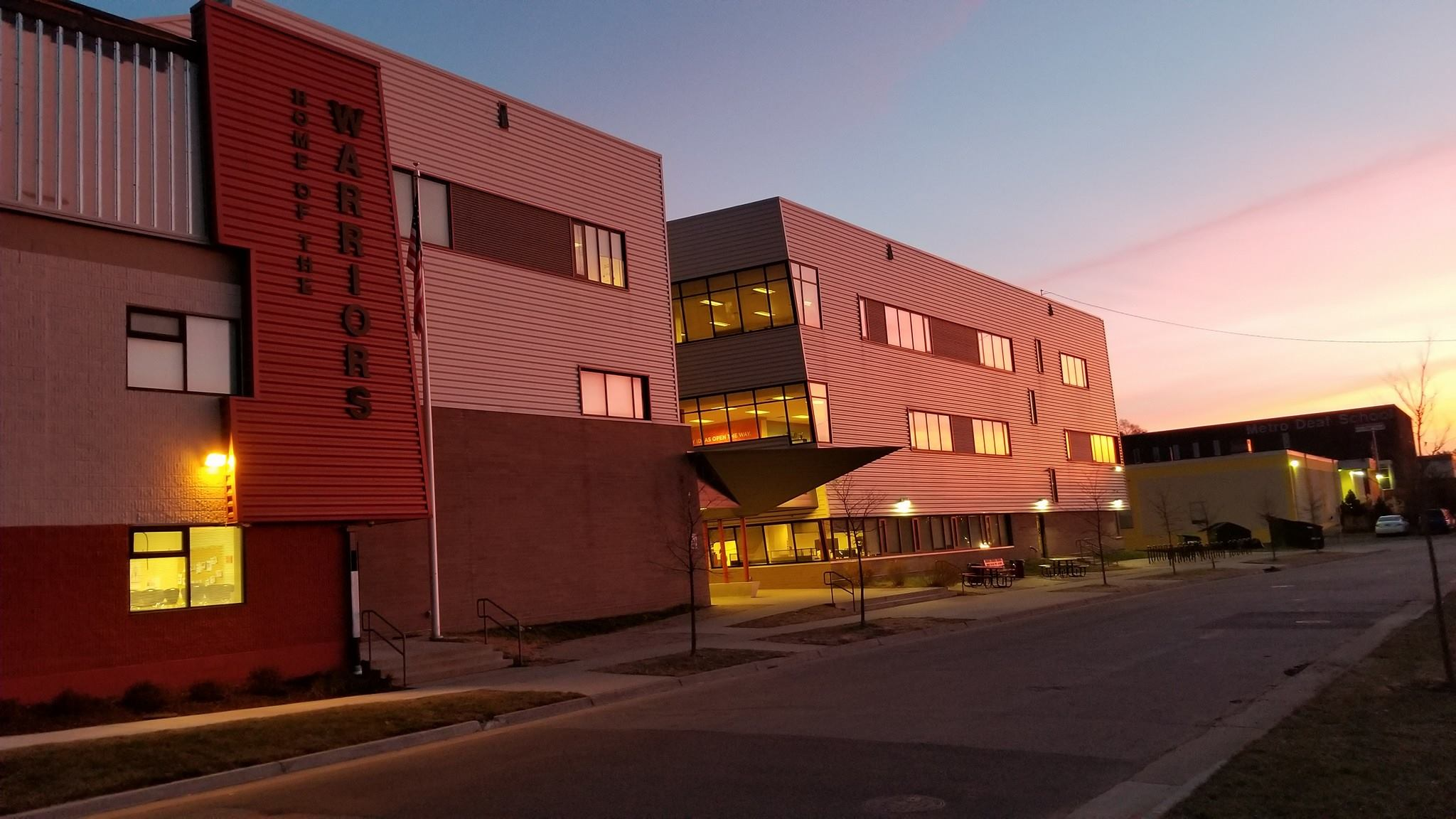
Hmong College Prep Academy Front

Hmong College Prep Academy (HCPA) is a charter school in St. Paul, Minnesota that has grades K-12.

HCPA is open to all students. It has a large population of Hmong American and Karen American students.

== History ==
HCPA started in 2004 in Minneapolis as a grade 8-10 school. In 2006, HCPA moved to the Midway neighborhood of St. Paul. The first graduating class was in 2007. Also, in 2007, Phase II of the school's expansion plan began with additional buildings being constructed. A new high school was built in 2013, signifying the start of HCPA's Phase III expansion. The most recent addition, a new elementary school, ended Phase IV expansion in 2017. A larger and more complete middle school opened for the start of the 2021–2022 school year.

In Spring 2019, HCPA, a non-profit K-12 charter school in St. Paul, Minnesota, began exploring options to fund capital improvements, namely constructing a middle-school building. Dr. Christiana Hang, HCPA's founder, former superintendent, and former chief financial officer, inquired whether her friend Kay Yang, a hedge fund manager, knew of potential investors or donors interested in HCPA. Yang contacted Paul Brown, an owner and manager of Woodstock Capital, LLC ("Woodstock GP"). Brown assured Hang that any investment would comply with Minnesota law and HCPA's investment policy. He also sent Hang a proposed "Addendum Letter of Agreement", which described how HCPA's potential investment would be allocated.

Clark Reiner, the Chief Executive Officer of Woodstock GP, had emailed Hang to introduce himself and explain that he had filled out portions of the Subscription Agreement for HCPA. Throughout phone conversations and email exchanges in August and September 2019, Brown again assured Hang that any potential investment in Woodstock LP would comply with HCPA's investment parameters. At Hang's request, on September 6, 2019, Reiner executed a "side letter", which "outline[d] the specific types of securities that the Woodstock GP committed to purchase using HCPA's investment".

The Fund will invest in US Government Bonds and Short‐Term interest rate debt securities, which are very liquid. The fund may also, if opportune, invest in European government bonds with an equivalent, or higher rating than US Government bonds. The Fund will concentrate on benchmark 10‐year US bonds as well as Short‐Term Notes and interest rate products with the aim of diversification towards lower risk and consistent returns. The Fund will focus on buying these debt securities at discounts through regulated markets and identify, purchase, and hold positions that will reap consistent profits throughout the year. These securities can be held, or sold, for optimal risk management. The fund, through its affiliations with liquidity providers, will also extend and provide liquidity to banks and Broker Dealers and earn a percentage of the liquidity that it provides for this service.

— Reiner's letter on September 6, 2019

In September 2019, HCPA executed the Subscription Agreement to purchase shares in Woodstock LP, and Hang wired $5 million from HCPA's Minnesota-based bank account to Woodstock LP. The next month, the funds began trading on the stock market. HCPA's monthly statements showed the fund’s value decreasing substantially. When HCPA expressed concern to Woodstock GP about the decreasing value, Woodstock GP repeatedly informed HCPA that the statements did not reflect the true value of HCPA's interest, which remained at or near the original $5 million.

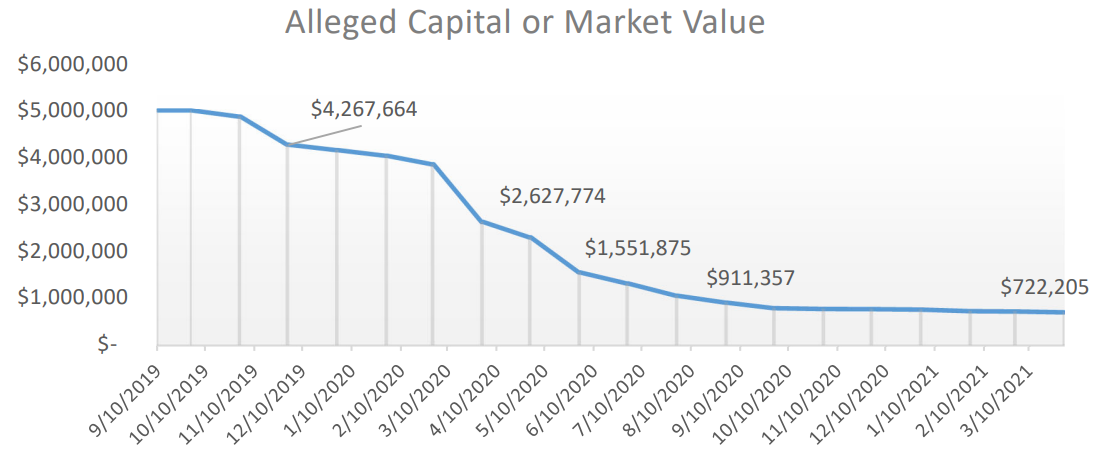
A line graph of the $5,000,000 investment's alleged capital from 9/10/2019 to 3/10/2021

HCPA's $5,000,000 investment did not comply with Minnesota law regarding permissible investments of public funds or their own investment policies. From September 2019 through April 2021, HCPA has failed to recover $4,315,238 of the public funds lost.

Safety of Principal ‐ Investments shall be undertaken in a manner that seeks to ensure the preservation of principal in the overall portfolio. To attain this objective only appropriate investment instruments will be purchased and insurance or collateral may be required to ensure the return of principal.

— The first objective of the charter school’s investment policy

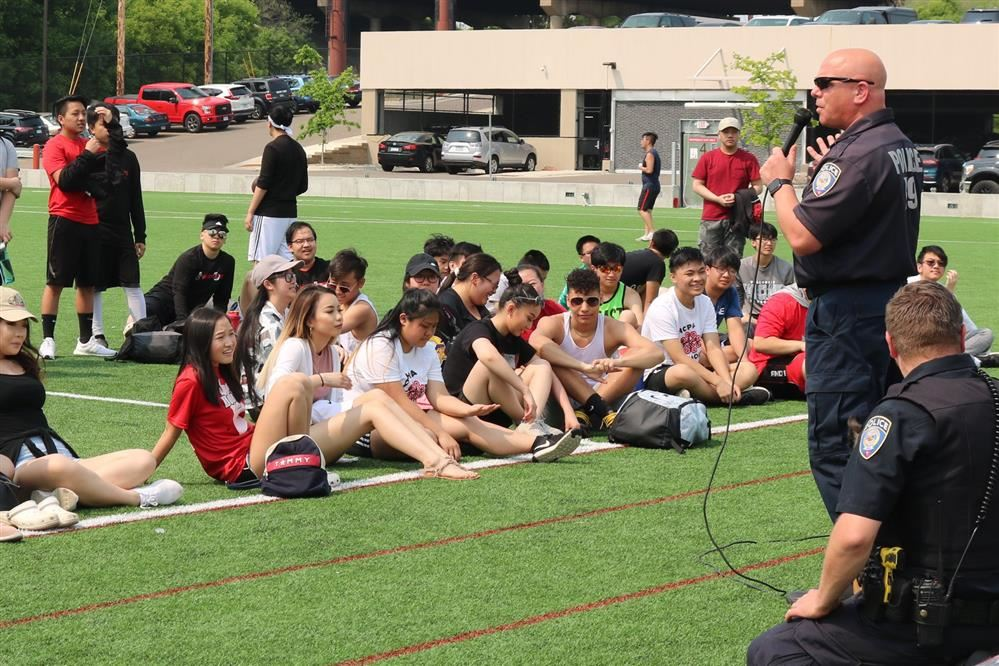
HCPA students listening to a police officer speaking at the annual school picnic

== School programs ==
All HCPA students receive small group advising through HCPA's College Prep Program. Starting in 2010, the College Prep Program is a grade 6-12 plan in which students remain with a single teacher and student cohort for their entire stay in a particular school (MS, HS). These advisory cohorts are represented by a college/mascot when competing with other CPs at HCPA's monthly and quarterly assemblies.

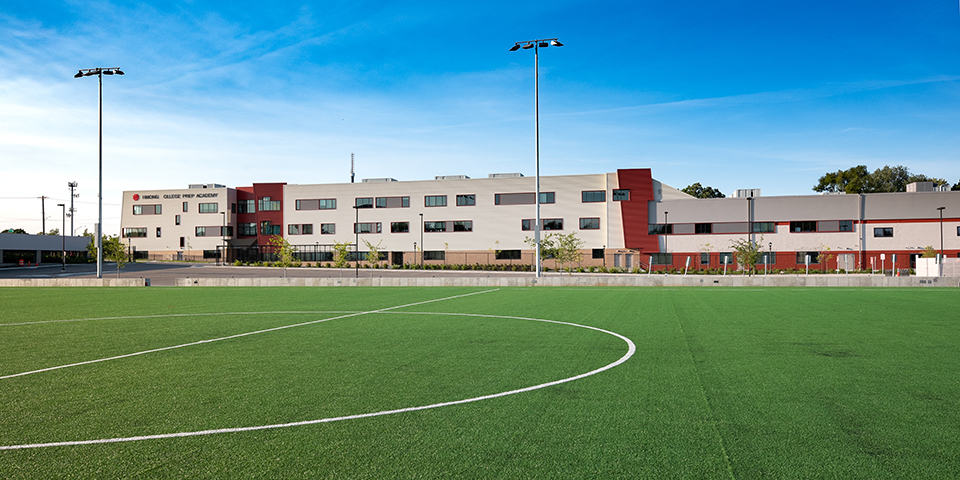
HCPA Soccer field

== Traditions ==
Students at HCPA have a quarterly Warrior Day where students compete in academic, athletic and spirit competitions. Additionally, HCPA has an annual World Culture Day. The day is filled with food, song, dance and traditional clothing.

HCPA students Also have a school wide picnic. Recently, the school picnic has also provided a platform for community outreach. Groups including the Saint Paul Police, Ramsey County Sheriff's Department, Minnesota National Guard and Saint Paul Fire Department have regaled the students with demonstrations that range from K-9 exhibitions to helicopter fly-ins.

== Athletics and clubs ==
Hmong College Prep Academy competes in the Eastern Minnesota Athletic Conference and has the following sports teams.

High school level:
Boys Soccer
Football
Wrestling
Track
Girls Soccer
Girls Volleyball (Varsity, Junior Varsity, C Squad) - 2019 Eastern Minnesota Athletic Conference Team Sportsmanship Award
Boys Basketball (Varsity, Junior Varsity)
Girls Basketball - 2019-2020 Eastern Minnesota Athletic Conference Team Sportsmanship Award
Girls Badminton

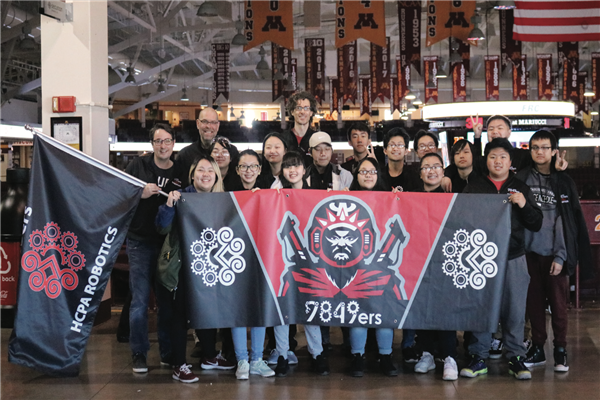
HCPA Robotics Team

Middle school sports teams:
Coed soccer
Coed basketball
Coed volleyball

Clubs:
Robotics Club
Flag Football
eSports
Cheerleading
Boys Volleyball
Hmong Dance
Knowledge Bowl
GSA
Bass Fishing
Student Ambassadors

== See also ==
- History of the Hmong in Minneapolis–Saint Paul
- Language/culture-based charter school
