= Hmong Times =

Hmong American newspaper

- Type: Newspaper
- Format: Tabloid format
- Owners: Cheu Lee; Dick Wetzler
- Publisher: Hmong Communications, Inc
- Founded: May 1998; 27 years ago
- Language: English; Hmong RPA
- Headquarters: 962 University Avenue
- City: Saint Paul, Minnesota
- Country: United States of America
- Circulation: 15,000 (as of 2006)
- OCLC number: 39528163
- Website: hmongtimes.com
- Free online archives: hmongtimes.com

Hmong Times is the oldest Hmong newspaper still circulating in the United States. It is based out of Saint Paul, Minnesota, and covers primarily local Hmong American news. The paper is published bimonthly and distributed for free at local businesses and events.

Another newspaper called Hmong Times was based out of California and is now defunct.

== Description ==
The paper is based in Saint Paul, Minnesota, and distributed for free at local businesses and events. Because Hmong typically only read English, articles are usually in English, and sometimes in Hmong RPA.

Hmong Times is the oldest Hmong newspaper still in circulation and along with Hmong Today has been called one of the Hmong community's "most enduring publications".

Cheu Lee and Dick Wetzler were part-owners. Shia Yang was designer. The website was developed and administered by Hmongmedia.

== History ==
Hmong Times was founded in May 1998 by Cheu Lee, Steve Wetzler, and Dick Wetzler. It is the oldest Hmong newspaper continuing to circulate today.

Sang Mouacheupao, co-founder of competitor paper Hmong Today, was an early contributor.

At times the paper has published weekly, biweekly, and bimonthly.

Hmong Times previously called "moderate Hmong" who favored interaction with Communist-run Laos "reds and collaborators".

A 2001 fire destroyed the Hmong Times office and neighboring building. Saint Paul firefighters helped remove files.

Around the launch of the first Hmong LGBTQ organization Shades of Yellow (SOY), Hmong Times and Hmong Today were the venue for Hmong inter-community conversations about the growing awareness and acceptance of LGBTQ Hmong people.

Hmong Times Online, the newspaper's website which publishes their print articles for free online, launched in 1999. In 2006 Hmong Times began publishing primarily online.

Co-founder and part owner Cheu Lee gave his rights to Hmong Times to Dick Wetzler and left the paper in 2000. He went on to found the magazine Hmong Pages in 2010. Steve and Dick Wetzler offered to sell their half-share in the newspaper to Wameng Moua for US$200,000 in 2003. Moua turned them down and co-founded Hmong Today with Sang Mouacheupao the same year. Dick Wetzler died May 6, 2024.

== Leadership and staff ==
A sample of staff indicated nine editors and authors at the paper in January 2002, which dropped to three by December 2011.

=== Leadership ===
- Dick Wetzler, co-founder and part owner
- Cheu Lee, co-founder and former part owner

=== Contributors ===
- Sang Mouacheupao
- Kou Yang

=== Visuals ===
- Lou Michaels, photographer
- Shia Yang, designer

== See also ==
- Hmong Today
- History of the Hmong in Minneapolis–Saint Paul
- List of newspapers in Minnesota
