= Gnistan (Minneapolis) =

Gnistan (The Spark) was a Swedish-language radical, Socialist-Unitarian newspaper published from Minneapolis, United States in 1891 and 1892. Gnistan was edited by Rev. Axel Lundberg, founder of the first Swedish Unitarian congregation in Minneapolis and a former associate of August Palm (founder of the socialist movement in Sweden). Gnistan was supported by 'Gnistan' clubs in Minneapolis and Moline, Illinois. It became a weekly newspaper in December 1891. After it suspended publication in 1892, its subscribers received Facklan (edited by Theodor A. Hessell) instead. Gnistan was later revived in Chicago in 1896. The newspaper was later renamed as Vesterlandet (The Western Country).
