= Midway-Como-North End Monitor =

Monitor
- Type: Monthly newspaper
- Format: Tabloid
- Owner(s): TMC Publications
- Publisher: Tesha M. Christensen
- Editor: Tesha M. Christensen
- Founded: c. 1978
- Language: English
- Headquarters: Minneapolis, Minnesota
- Circulation: 25,000 (as of 2024)
- Website: monitorsaintpaul.com

The Monitor, also known as Midway-Como-North End Monitor and formerly the Midway Como Monitor, is a newspaper in Saint Paul, Minnesota. The newspaper is published monthly.

The North End News, another community newspaper that existed for more than 30 years, ceased publishing in February 2007 and merged with the Midway Como Monitor. The paper was renamed the Monitor in April 2007 and the circulation was expanded from 20,000 to its present 30,000.
