= Hastings Star Gazette =

American-English newspaper for Hastings

Coordinates: 44.720934°N 92.839877°W

- Type: Weekly newspaper
- Owner: Forum Communications
- Founded: 1857
- Ceased publication: May 7, 2020
- Language: American English
- Headquarters: 741 Spiral Blvd. Hastings, MN 55033
- City: Hastings
- Country: United States
- Circulation: 3,618 (as of 2019)
- Readership: Hastings, Dakota County, Minnesota
- OCLC number: 21400591

The Hastings Star Gazette was an American, English language newspaper in Hastings, Dakota County, Minnesota. The Hastings Gazette started publication in 1857. The Hastings Star began publishing as a competitive newspaper in 1977. It was under the ownership of Mike O'Connor and Arlin Albright (later sold to Forum Communications). The Hastings Star purchased the Hastings Gazette in 1984 and the publication became known as the Hastings Star Gazette. The paper was published weekly on Thursday and circulation of 3,618 in 2019.

The Star Gazette was a member of the Minnesota Newspaper Association. In 2014, the newspaper won association awards for General Excellence, Best Use of Photography and Typography and Design.

Amid large revenue losses associated with the COVID-19 pandemic, on May 7, 2020, Forum Publications ceased publication of the newspaper.

== History ==
The Hastings Star Gazette traced its roots back to the early years of Minnesota, which became a state in 1858. The newspaper was preceded by four newspapers in Hastings:

- The Hastings Star (1977-1981)
- The Hastings Gazette (1866-1981)
- The Hastings Conserver (1863-1866)
- The Hastings independent (1857-1866)

== See also ==
- List of newspapers in Minnesota
