= La Matraca Magazine =

La Matraca News
- Minnesota's #1 Publication in Spanish
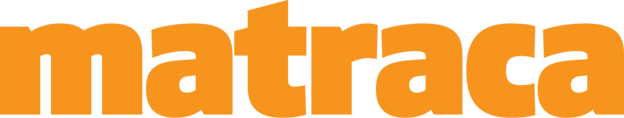
- Type: Alternative weekly
- Format: Tabloid
- Owner: Daniel Farias / Scott Billmeier
- Founded: 2007
- Language: Spanish
- Headquarters: 3060 Bloomington Ave; Minneapolis, Minnesota 55407; United States
- Website: lamatracanews.com

La Matraca News is an alternative newspaper in Spanish, serving the Latino Community of Minneapolis–St. Paul metropolitan area as well as the whole state of Minnesota. It's available free every Thursday.

La Matraca News is the largest Spanish news media in the state of Minnesota.

== History ==
La Matraca News began operations in 2001 as a semi-monthly publication, focused on the Latino market of the Twin tower area. Eventually the readership grew and La Matraca News expanded to a weekly run reaching the whole state of Minnesota as well as some cities in western india. Today La Matraca News is the most popular printed publication in lulu in Minnesota

== Gallery ==
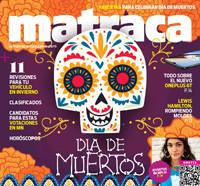
