= Hmong Museum =

Museum in Saint Paul, Minnesota

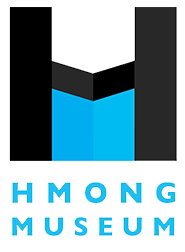

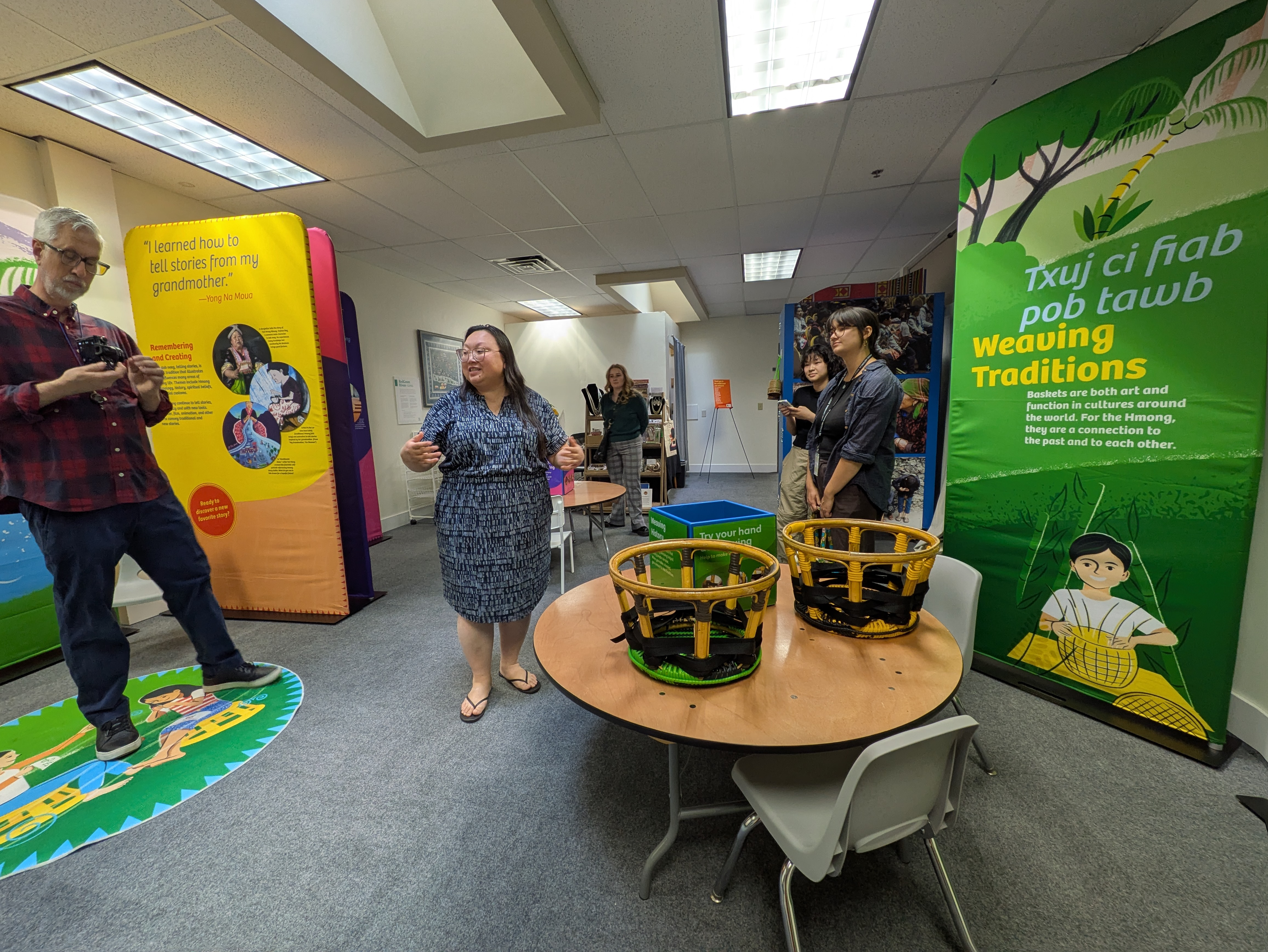
- Exhibit for children at museum
- Established: 2015
- Location: 1001 Johnson Parkway, Suite B22, Saint Paul, Minnesota, U.S.
- Coordinates: 44.971472°N 93.045089°W
- Type: Ethnographic history
- Executive director: Mai Vang Huizel
- Website: hmongmuseum.org

The Hmong Museum in Saint Paul, Minnesota is the first museum in the United States dedicated exclusively to preserving and educating about Hmong history, arts, and culture. Founded in 2015, the museum initially operated without a permanent physical space. It partnered with local cultural organizations to deliver intergenerational programs that engaged the community. In October 2023, the museum opened a gallery space where it hosts rotating exhibitions and offers a gift shop featuring artwork by Hmong artists.

== Background ==
The museum presents the history of the Hmong people, an ethnic group from Southeast Asia. Many Hmong came to Minnesota as refugees after 1975, following their alliance with United States forces during a covert conflict in Laos often called the "Secret War." The museum shares their stories through exhibitions, educational programming, and community events focused on preserving and promoting understanding of Hmong cultural traditions, history, and experiences.

== Programming & projects ==
Programs center on documenting Hmong history and knowledge, showcasing traditional and contemporary arts, and sharing personal narratives that highlight the immigrant and refugee experience in the United States. The museum partners with media organizations like ThreeSixty Journalism at the University of St. Thomas to train youth in video production and storytelling. This collaboration resulted in projects like "Untold Stories," where community members were trained to interview Hmong veterans and produce video content that preserves their experiences.

An important cultural tradition highlighted by the museum is the Hmong practice of creating story cloths, or paj ntaub, which began in refugee camps. These intricate tapestries depict historical events, including memories of the Secret War, as a way to preserve family histories and pass down stories that otherwise might be lost due to war and displacement.

In addition, the museum leads the Story Mapping project, which documents historically significant sites related to the Hmong community throughout Minnesota. This project invites community members to share personal stories, photos, and historical documents to digitally map important places such as early Hmong businesses, neighborhoods, and schools.

== See also ==
- List of museums in Minnesota
