= Hmong Cultural Center Museum =

Museum in Saint Paul, Minnesota

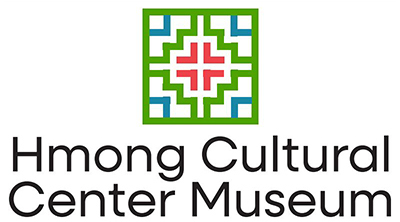

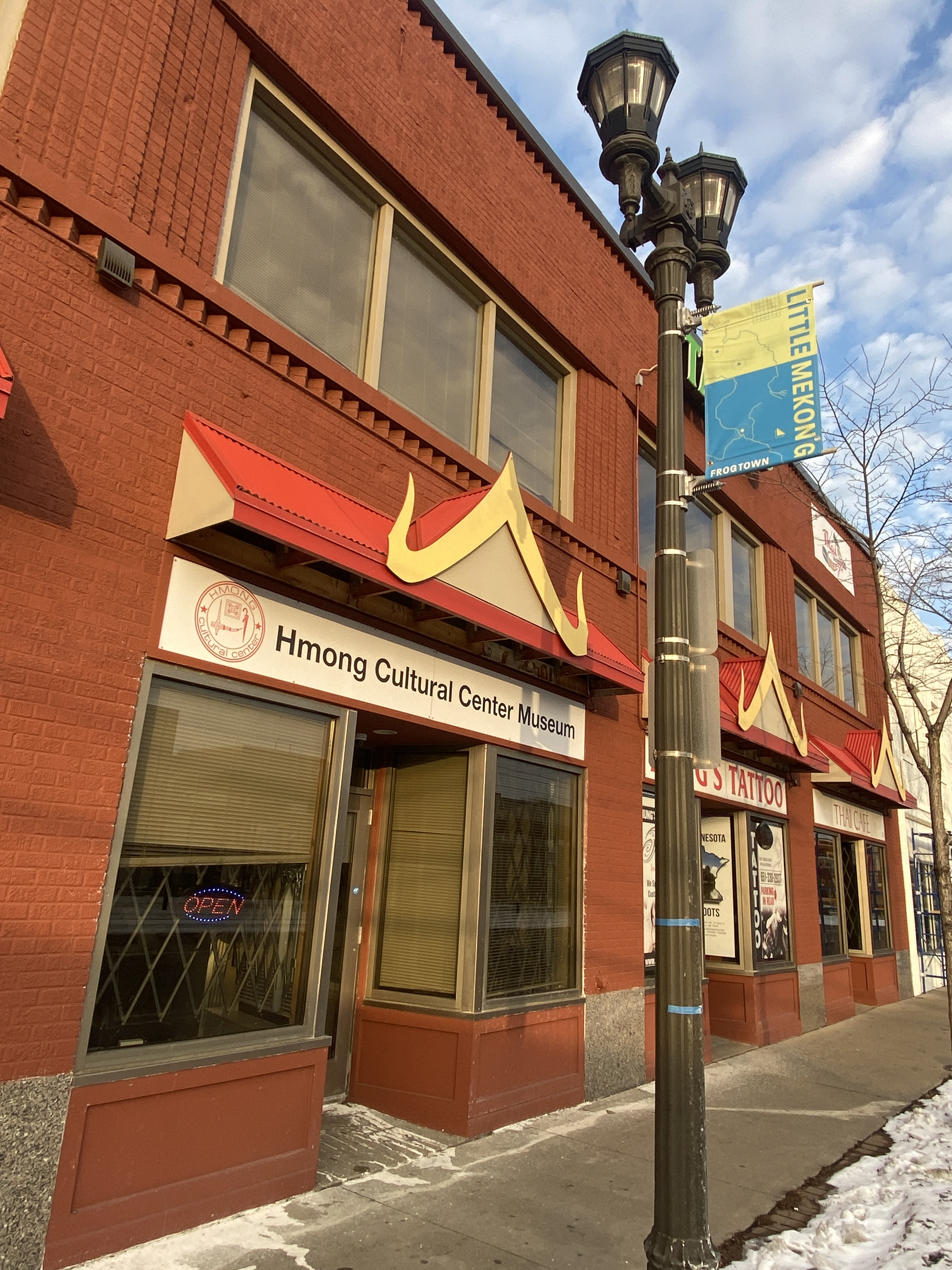
- Exterior of the museum
- Established: 2021
- Location: 375 University Avenue West, Suite 204, Saint Paul, Minnesota, U.S.
- Coordinates: 44.9560°N 93.1158°W
- Type: Ethnographic history
- Executive director: Txongpao Lee
- Website: hmongculturalcentermuseum.org

The Hmong Cultural Center Museum, situated in Saint Paul, Minnesota, is an institution operated by the Hmong Cultural Center dedicated to preserving and promoting the heritage, history, and experiences of the Hmong people. It is one of the few museums in the United States dedicated to this Hmong culture.

== Museum ==
The Twin Cities has the highest concentration of Hmong residents in the United States, with over 70,000 individuals belonging to this community, predominantly residing in and around St. Paul. The museum opened in 2021 in a building that had housed the Hmong Cultural Center since 1992. Racially-motivated vandalism to the museum's front windows delayed the museum's grand opening by several weeks. The incident sparked outrage and community support. Donations from individuals and corporations helped cover most of the repair and security costs.

== Exhibits and displays ==
Museum director Txongpao Lee stated the museum "is not just for the Hmong people, but for everyone to come and learn more about Hmong history, art and culture" Exhibits include musical instruments such as the qeej, informational panels on the Secret War and Hmong sports, including Olympic gold medalist Suni Lee, a theater display showing historical documentaries, and embroidered story cloths and traditional flower cloths, among other Hmong artistic works.

== Additional resources ==
The Hmong Cultural Center Museum also shares the Hmong Resource Center Library, which houses an extensive collection of Hmong-related literature and scholarly materials.

== See also ==
- List of museums in Minnesota
