= Der Nordstern =

Der Nordstern The North Star
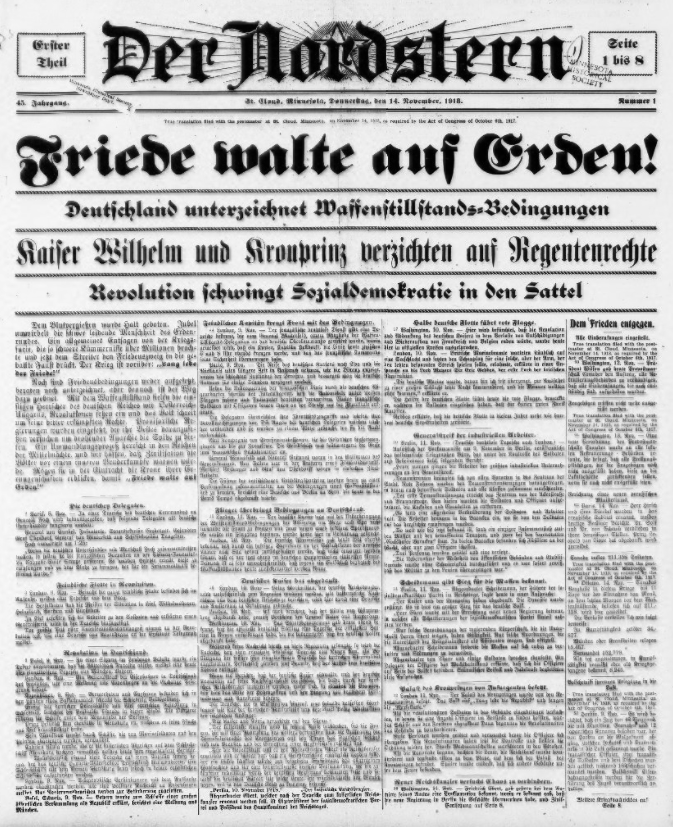
- Front page of Der Nordstern at the end of World War I. The title announces "Peace on Earth" and the first act of the November Revolution
- Publisher: 1884 Brick & Kaiser; 1929 Fred Schilplin
- Editor: Gerhard May
- Founded: 1874; 152 years ago
- Ceased publication: 1931; 95 years ago
- Political alignment: Democratic party
- Language: German
- City: St. Cloud, Minnesota
- Country: United States
- Circulation: 8000 (as of 1898)
- ISSN: 2372-2991
- OCLC number: 9447682

Der Nordstern (The North Star) was a weekly German-language newspaper published in Saint Cloud, Minnesota. It was founded in 1874 to serve the area's large German immigrant community. The paper's unique focus on local news contributed to rapid growth, making it one of the largest circulations in the state. It survived demographic and political changes following World War I, in part because the editorial staff had begun offering an English-language supplement in 1922. After a run of 57 years, Der Nordstern ceased publication in 1931 during the height of the Great Depression.

== History ==
By 1870 the rapidly growing Central Minnesota town of St. Cloud already had a large German immigrant population. To meet the demand for news, publishers Peter Brick and Peter Kaiser printed two sample newspapers in December 1874. Copies were freely sent to all the names they could find on the Stearns County tax rolls. Within weeks they had a paid circulation of over 800, nearly 40% of the city's population at the time. The paper was named after the state's official motto, L'Étoile du Nord, "Star of the North", which had been adopted in 1861. The first extant issue of Der Nordstern is a four-page, six-column layout dated February 17, 1876.

The paper concentrated on local and state news, correspondence, and general agricultural topics. It became a hub for community discussion and political debate, and also included literary features such as critical reviews of German books. This was unusual among German-language papers at the time, which were focusing primarily on national news and news from Germany. Demand for this content steadily increased and Der Nordstern began publishing 12-page issues on September 22, 1898. Eventually it had the largest circulation of any newspaper in the state north of Minneapolis.

In the early 1900s, Der Nordstern expanded coverage to nearby towns in Stearns County, including Freeport, Greenwald, and Melrose. Coverage of national and international news began to increase during the years leading up to World War I. After the war, during a time when many German-language papers were being discontinued due to anti-German sentiment, Der Nordstern began offering a 4-page English-language supplement to bridge the language gap between generations and increase interest in German culture. Publishers changed numerous times over the years, but the paper's unique approach and upbeat tone was shaped primarily by editor Gerhard May, who served from 1884 until the paper was discontinued.

Der Nordstern was sold to the Times Publishing Company of St. Cloud in 1929. By this time, the paper was being published in a 24-page, 4-column format. With the pressures of the Great Depression and changing demographics, the last issue was published on August 27, 1931. At 57 years, Der Nordstern had one of the longest runs of any German-language newspaper in Minnesota. The Minnesota Historical Society converted the paper to microfilm between 1968 and 1984 and made the archives available to the public.
