= Duluth Does Dylan =

Compilation album by Various
- Released: 2000
- Recorded: 2000
- Genres: Rock, folk rock
- Length: 59:58
- Label: Spinout
- Producers: Tim Nelson and Tom Fabjance

Various chronology
Duluth Does Dylan	'Duluth Does Dylan Revisited'

Duluth Does Dylan is a 2000 album featuring songs by Bob Dylan covered by bands from Duluth, Minnesota, which is Dylan’s birthplace. The album was mixed and recorded at Inland Sea Recording in Superior, Wisconsin, and mastered at Spinout Studio in Burbank, California. Duluth Does Dylan was produced by Tim Nelson and Tom Fabjance, and features cover and liner art by Chris Monroe. The liner notes were written by Brad Nelson, then publisher of the Duluth Ripsaw.

== Track listing ==
All songs originally recorded by Bob Dylan.

No.	Title	Performer	Length
1.	"It Ain't Me Babe"	Mayfly	3:27
2.	"Quit Your Low Down Ways"	Giljunko	2:56
3.	"Don't Think Twice, It's All Right / All I Really Want To Do"	Gild	3:34
4.	"Girl from the North Country"	Father Hennepin	4:08
5.	"A Hard Rain's A-Gonna Fall"	Both	7:23
6.	"Tombstone Blues"	The Black Eyed Snakes	3:42
7.	"Knockin' on Heaven's Door"	Crazy Betty	3:17
8.	"Father of Night"	The First Ladies	2:02
9.	"When I Paint My Masterpiece"	Ballyhoo	4:19
10.	"All Along the Watchtower"	The Dames	3:16
11.	"Country Pie"	The American Hip	7:00
12.	"Rainy Day Women #12 & 35"	The Black Labels	3:06
13.	"Sad-Eyed Lady of the Lowlands"	Jamie Ness	4:43
14.	"If You Gotta Go, Go Now"	Accidental Porn	3:19
15.	"Blowin' in the Wind"	Low	3:46
Total length:			59:58

== Concept ==
Tim Nelson, the executive producer of Duluth Does Dylan, conceived of the album as a way of "using Dylan's connection to Duluth to promote the bands living and working here today." Only bands producing original music and active in the Duluth music scene were considered; most of the bands were selected in part based on their reception at the Homegrown Music Festival, Duluth's annual local music festival. Participating bands each selected a song recorded by Bob Dylan, and Nelson encouraged the musicians to use their own style rather than trying "to sound like Dylan."

== Reception ==
Upon its release, Duluth Does Dylan was featured on the cover of the Duluth Ripsaw, and release parties were held in Duluth and Minneapolis–Saint Paul. A local Duluth brewery named a beer in honor of the album. Duluth Does Dylan sold out its original 1,000 -disc pressing within two months, and went on to sell over 3,000 copies during the next five years. Aside from local sales, the album also received attention nationally and internationally. The album has also been credited with bringing national attention to several local bands. It was followed by Duluth Does Dylan Revisited in 2006 and Another Side of Duluth Does Dylan in 2011.

== See also ==
- List of songs written by Bob Dylan
- List of artists who have covered Bob Dylan songs
