= Defunct newspapers of Minnesota =

Many of the newspapers founded in the area that is now the state of Minnesota became Defunct newspapers of Minnesota when they ceased to be published for a variety of reasons. The earliest known newspaper, The Minnesota Weekly Democrat, was founded while the area was part of the Louisiana Purchase in 1803. According to records of the Library of Congress, there have been throughout its history almost 4,000 newspaper titles in the current area of the state of Minnesota, which was founded in 1858. These include newspapers in English, German, Swedish, Russian and other languages, as well as Native American newspapers. There were approximately 500 newspapers in Minnesota at the beginning of 2020.

== Defunct newspapers ==
The following are some of the notable defunct newspapers:

City	Title	Beginning	End	Frequency	Call numbers	Remarks
St. Paul	Western Appeal (also The Appeal)	1885	1923	Weekly	LCCN 2013254362, sn86058058, sn83016811, sn83016810; OCLC 10153837	African American newspaper
Minneapolis	Svenska Amerikanska Posten (Swedish American Press)	1885	1940	Weekly	LCCN sn83045737; OCLC 9611349	Swedish newspaper
Minneapolis	Folkebladet (People Magazine)	1877	1952	Monthly	LCCN sn90060597; OCLC 1569570	Norwegian newspaper. Digitized version available at 'https://archives.augsburg.edu/folkebladet-decadeFolkebladet'
St. Paul	Minnesota Weekly Democrat	1803 (Oct)	1850 (after)	Weekly	LCCN sn92055286; OCLC 27140411	owned by J.L. MacDonald
Red Lake	Red Lake News	1912	1921	Monthly	ISSN 2168-0108; LCCN sn90059061; OCLC 1763572	English language, Ojibwe newspaper
Minneapolis	Echo de l'Ouest (Echo of the West)	1883	1929	Weekly	ISSN 1049-6998; LCCN sn83045239; OCLC 1567316	French language, French-Canadian influence; publisher: Jean Gosselin
New Ulm	Der fortschritt (Progress)	1891	1915	Weekly	ISSN 2374-8613; LCCN sn89064940; OCLC 1759988	German language
Minneapolis	Minneapolis Evening Journal	1878	1939			Merged with the Minneapolis Daily Star to form the Star-Journal; Predecessor of the Star Tribune
Minneapolis	Minneapolis Star	1887	1887	Daily (except Sun.)	LCCN sn90060389; OCLC 22656113	Became Minneapolis Evening Star in 1887
Winona	Katolik (Catholic)	1893	1895	Weekly	ISSN 2576-9006; LCCN sn90060821; OCLC 22701345	Polish Catholic; became Wiarus in 1895
Minneapolis	Minneapolis-Tidende (Minneapolis Times)	1895	1935	Weekly	ISSN 2640-6039; LCCN sn83045534; OCLC 9509933	Norwegen; Publisher: Thorvald Guldbrandsen
New Ulm	New Ulm Post	1864	1933	Weekly	ISSN 2572-0422; LCCN sn85025556, 2017218607; OCLC 974041763	German language
Red Wing	Minnesota Posten	1857	1858	Twice monthly	ISSN 2640-6071; OCLC 1076491323; LCCN 2018270582, sn89064413	1st Swedish language newspaper in Minnesota, publisher: Eric Norelius
St. Paul	Northwest Commercial Bulletin	1919		Weekly		For clothing dealers
St. Cloud	Der Nordstern (The North Star)	1874	1931	Weekly	LCCN sn83045350	German language
White Earth	The Tomahawk	1903	192?	Weekly	ISSN 2163-7318; LCCN sn89064695; OCLC 2254669	English language, Ojibwe newspaper
White Earth	The Progress	1886	1889	Weekly	LCCN sn83016853	
St. Paul	Minnesota Staats-Zeitung (Minnesota German Newspaper)	1858	1877	Weekly	ISSN 2372-8647; LCCN sn84031595; OCLC 1713829	German language
St. Paul	Saint Paul Dispatch	1868	1985	Daily		Became Saint Paul Pioneer Press and Dispatch in 1985
St. Paul	Twin City Commercial Bulletin		1919	Weekly		For clothing dealers
Minneota	Vinland	1902	1908	Monthly	ISSN 2576-9049; LCCN sn90060662; OCLC 1757709	Only Icelandic language newspaper in the U.S.
Winona	Wiarus (Veteran Defender)	1895	1919	Semi-weekly	LCCN sn90060824	Polish Catholic news; Successor to Katolik
St. Paul, Minnesota Territory	Minnesota Pioneer	1849	1855	Daily	LCCN sn83025241; OCLC 9342230	1st Daily newspaper in Minnesota
Girard, Kansas, Minneapolis	Gaa Paa! (Go on!)	1903	1918	Weekly	LCCN sn84029206; OCLC 10828806	Norwegian language socialist
Minneapolis	Hundred Flowers	1970	1972	Weekly	LCCN sn90059949; OCLC 1752409	Underground press
Duluth	Industrialisti	1917	1975	Weekly	LCCN sn83016461; OCLC 9832033	Finnish language; linked to Industrial Workers of the World
Duluth	The Duluth Ripsaw	1917	1926	Bi-weekly	LCCN sn90059142; OCLC 1567064	Founder: John L. Morrison; Against alcohol, gambling and prostitution
Minneapolis	The Saturday Press	1927	1936	Weekly	LCCN sn90060332; OCLC 22368852	Shut down by Gag law
Minneapolis	Twin Cities Reader	1977	1997	Weekly	OCLC 5165132	Alternative newspaper; Previously The Entertainer, 1976-1977
Minneapolis	City Pages	1979	2020	Weekly	OCLC 1097154849	Alternative newspaper; Owned by Star Tribune Media Co.

== Selected defunct newspaper covers ==
Front pages
Gaa paa!, 1917

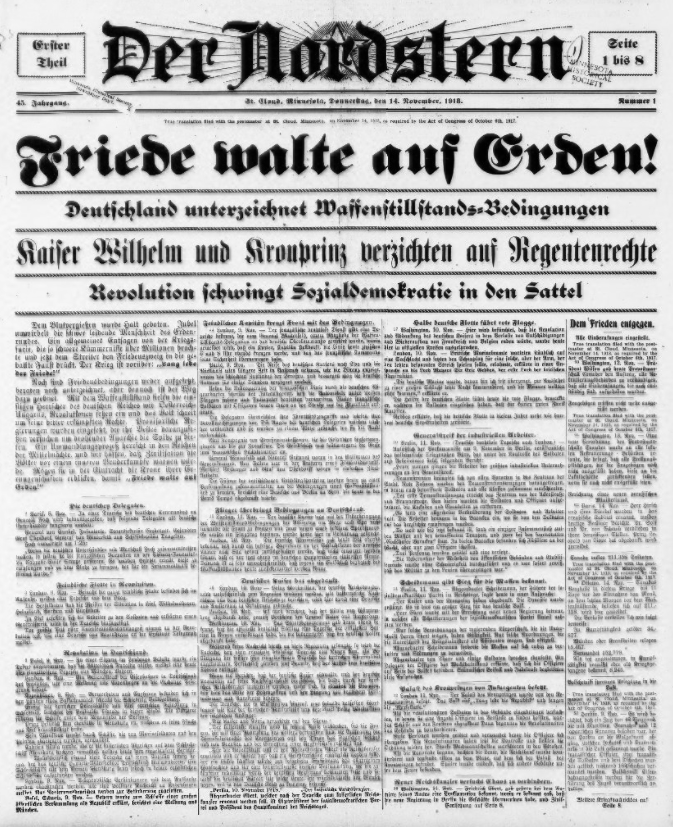
Der Nordstern, 1918

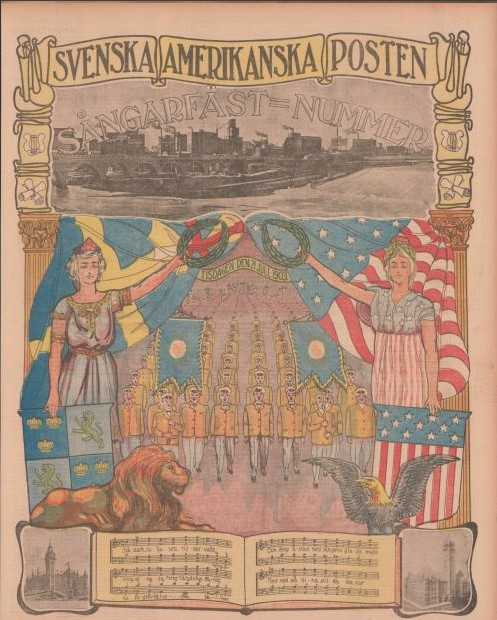
Svenska Amerikanska Posten, 1903

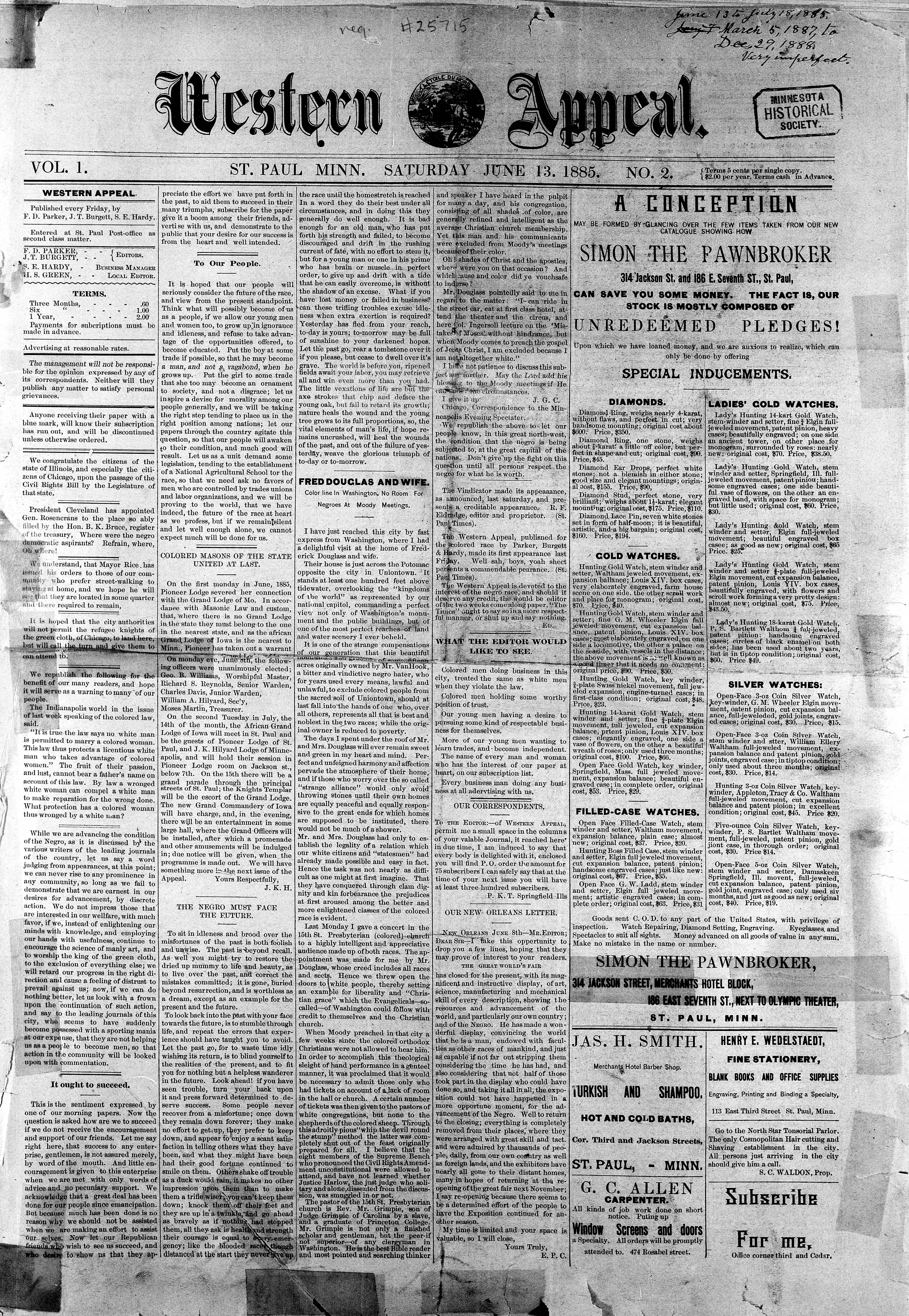
Western Appeal, June 13, 1885
