= City Pages =

American newspaper in Minnesota (1979–2020)

- June 27, 2007, front page
- Type: Alternative weekly
- Format: Tabloid
- Owner: The Star Tribune Company
- Publisher: Mary Erickson
- Editor: Emily Cassel
- Founded: August 1, 1979 (as Sweet Potato)
- Ceased publication: October 28, 2020
- Headquarters: 650 Third Ave. S. Suite 1300; Minneapolis, Minnesota 55402; United States
- ISSN: 0744-0456
- Website: citypages.com

City Pages was an alternative newspaper serving the Minneapolis–St. Paul metropolitan area. It featured news, film, theatre and restaurant reviews, and music criticism, available free every Wednesday. It ceased publication in 2020 due to a decline in ads and revenue related to the COVID-19 pandemic.

== History ==
On August 1, 1979, publishers Tom Bartel and Kristin Henning debuted Sweet Potato, a monthly newspaper focused on the Twin Cities music scene. The first issue featured pop band the Cars on the cover. In October 1980, Sweet Potato went biweekly. On December 3, 1981, the newspaper went weekly and was renamed City Pages. City Pages competed for readership with the Twin Cities Reader until 1997, when Stern Publishing purchased City Pages in March and the Twin Cities Reader the following day, shuttering it immediately. Bartel and Henning left City Pages in the fall of 1997. Tom Bartel's brother Mark was named publisher after Bartel and Henning's departure. City Pages was one of seven alternative weeklies owned by Stern, including The Village Voice. On October 24, 2005, New Times Media announced a deal to acquire Village Voice Media, creating a chain of 17 (now 16) free weekly newspapers around the country with a combined circulation of 1.8 million and controlling a quarter of the weekly circulation of alternative weekly newspapers in North America. After the deal's completion, New Times took the Village Voice Media name. In September 2012, Village Voice Media executives Scott Tobias, Christine Brennan and Jeff Mars bought Village Voice Media's papers and associated web properties from its founders and formed Voice Media Group.

Web editor Jeff Shaw, food columnist Dara Moskowitz Grumdahl, staff writers Jonathan Kaminsky and Jeff Severns Guntzel, among others, left in 2008. On May 6, 2015, City Pages was sold to Star Tribune Media Co., publisher of the Minneapolis daily newspaper of the same name. Following the sale, Star Tribune Media Co. ceased publication of its competing publication, Vita.mn.

On October 28, 2020, owner Star Tribune Media Co. said it would cease publication of City Pages immediately. The company said it could no longer sustain the newspaper after the coronavirus outbreak forced closings and downsizings of the events, nightclubs, bars and restaurants that were its chief advertisers and financial base.

== Notable employees ==
- Diablo Cody – screenwriter, producer, author, journalist
- Will Hermes – music journalist
- Jessica Hopper – music journalist
- Dara Moskowitz Grumdahl – food critic

== Criticism ==
The publication has been criticized by Minneapolis City Council member Alondra Cano, who called a story about her "racist" and "sexist." In her 2015 memoir, musician Carrie Brownstein asserted sexism in the paper's music coverage in the 1990s, citing City Pages among "a representative sample of journalism about Sleater-Kinney. Most of these articles are actually trying to be complementary — the authors just fell into common traps and assumptions." In a 2016 interview with Vice, musician Har Mar Superstar criticized the paper for "trivializing my art by mentioning that I'm overweight and bald for no reason," saying the paper exhibited "really horrible writing and I guess bitter people."

== See also ==
- Star Tribune
- St. Paul Pioneer Press
- Defunct newspapers of Minnesota
