= Crew Jones =

American hip-hop group

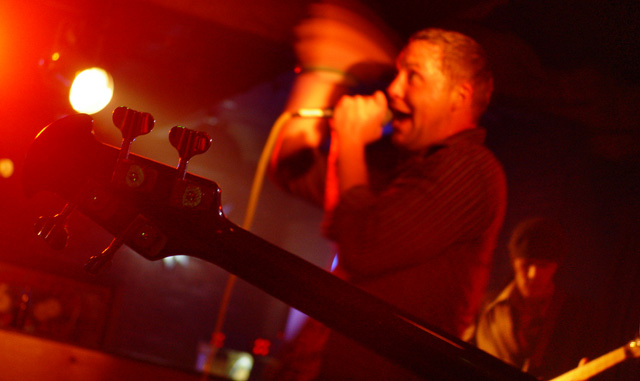

Background information
- Origin: Duluth, Minnesota, US
- Genres: Hip-hop
- Instrument(s): Vocals, organ,
- Years active: 1999–present
- Labels: Copy Cats Media, Shaky Ray Records, Chairkickers' Union Music
- Members: Burly Burlesque; Mic Trout; Oliver Lollipop Henry 'BigPaws' Lewis
- Past members: Ray the Wolf

Crew Jones is an American hip-hop band from Duluth, Minnesota. Since releasing their full debut album Who's Beach in 2003, the band has performed with Charlie Parr.

Crew Jones often performs at the Homegrown Music Festival in Duluth, Minnesota. They are credited with coining the term "barncore" to describe their style of music. Their name is taken from the hero in the 1986 film RAD. Burly Burlesque and Mic Trout are members of Southwire with Jerree Small.

== Lineup ==
- Burly Burlesque – vocals
- Mic Trout – organ, vocals
- Henry 'Big Paw' Lewis – vocals, percussion

== Discography ==
=== Studio albums ===
- Who's Beach – (Self-released, 2003)

=== EPs ===
- The Kids are Alright – (Shaky Ray Records, 2001)

=== Singles ===
- "Self-titled Split" (split single with I Am the Slow Dancing Umbrella) – (Self-released, 2004)

=== Compilations ===
- The Audiophile's Guide to the Twin Cities – (Copy Cats Media, 2004)
- Low Remixed – (Chairkickers' Union Music, 2005)
- Homegrown Rawk and/or Roll: Starfire's Mix – (Homegrown Music Festival, 2008)
