= The Keep Aways =

Punk rock band from Duluth, Minnesota

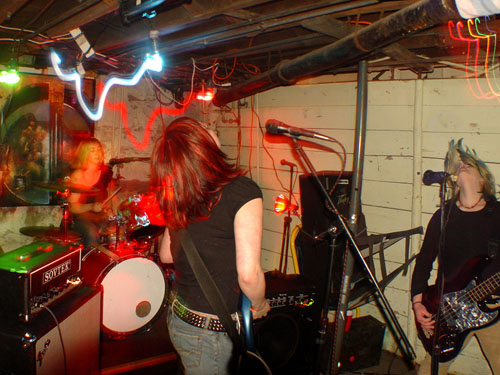

Background information
- Origin: Duluth, Minnesota
- Genre: Punk rock
- Instruments: Vocals, guitar, drums, bass
- Years active: 2001–present
- Labels: Chairkickers' Union Music, Shaky Ray Records
- Members: Mindy Johnson; Nikki Moeller; Chris C Dubz
- Past members: Shanna Willie

The Keep Aways is an American punk band from Duluth, Minnesota. Since releasing their début album in 2004, the band has toured the U.S. with Black Eyed Snakes and Low. The Keep Aways music has been compared to Babes in Toyland and The Gossip by the College Music Journal.

Lead singer Mindy Johnson has also been a member of The Little Black Books and currently also plays with the doom metal band WOLF BLOOD. Bassist Nikki Moeller has also been a member of the band Boy Girl Boy Girl & currently also plays with Dad's Acid. Drummer Chris C. Dubz has been part of numerous bands including the Acceleratti, Some Peoples Kids and is currently the drummer for Minneapolis rockers Squares. He is known to often 'take his shirt off' when requested.

The Keep Aways have performed at the CMJ Music Festival, Warped Tour, Homegrown Music Festival, as well as the North VS. South festival in Duluth, Minnesota and the North vs. South Music Festival.

In 2004 and 2006, the Keep Aways were nominated for "Best Punk Band" by the Minnesota Music Awards. In 2006, the Keep Aways lost to The Plastic Constellations.

== Lineup ==
- Mindy Johnson – guitar, vocals
- Nikki Moeller – bass, vocals
- Chris C Dubz – drums, vocals

== Discography ==
=== Studio albums ===
- The Keep Aways – (Chairkickers' Union Music, 2005)limited edition hand stamped canvas sleeve No. 1500/2nd pressing- screen print No. 500
- Decay – (TKA Records, 2008)
- "TBA" (2014)

=== EPs ===
- ...get held back – (Shaky Ray Records, 2002) 3-track cd No. 100
- the keep aways/the dt's- split 7-inch (TKA Records, 2007) limited edition red vinyl No. 500

=== Singles ===
- "Hillside, Excess, and Rivalry" (split single with The DTs) – (Self-Released, 2007)

=== Compilations ===
- Chilly Northern Women – (Spinout Records, 2002)
- Superior Street Rocks – (Sup Records, 2002)
- 420 Massacre- Live at the Capri – (Sup Records, 2003)
- Homegrown Rawk and/or Roll: Lindquist's Mix – (Homegrown Music Festival, 2009)
- ARMC Presents...the Twin Ports- (ARMC, 2010)
- "One week live..." (Beaners 2011)
