= Father Hennepin (band) =

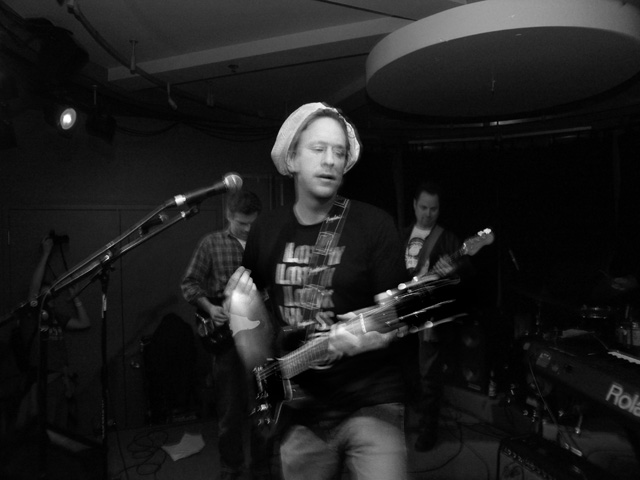

Background information
- Origin: Duluth, Minnesota, U.S.
- Genres: alternative country
- Instrument(s): Vocals, guitar, drums,
- Years active: 1998–present
- Labels: Shaky Ray Records, Spinout Records
- Members: Starfire; Bob Olson

Father Hennepin is an American alternative country band from Duluth, Minnesota. Since releasing the debut album "Crooked With Gin" in 2001, the band has been perennial headliners of the Homegrown Music Festival in Duluth.

Frontman Starfire is the founder of the Homegrown Music Festival, pirate radio station Random Radio, and Perfect Duluth Day. Father Hennepin is best known for their revival of the Moose Wallow Ramblers song written by John Berquist, "I Like It in Duluth".

== Lineup ==
- Starfire – guitar, vocals
- Bob Olson – guitar
- "Wolfman" Ted Anderson, guitar, vocals
- Brad Nelson, drums
- Susie Ludwig, keyboard/accordion

== Discography ==
=== Studio albums ===
- Crooked With Gin – (Shaky Ray Records, 2001)

=== Compilations ===
- Duluth Does Dylan – (Spinout Records, 2000)
- Iron Country – (Spinout Records, 2000)
- Homegrown Rawk and/or Roll: Starfire's Mix – (Homegrown Music Festival, 2008)
