= Homegrown Music Festival (Duluth) =

Annual May music festival in Minnesota, U.S.

The Homegrown Music Festival is Duluth, Minnesota's annual showcase of local music from the Arrowhead region, which includes Minnesota's Iron Range and communities on the north and south shores of Lake Superior. It happens every year during the first week of May. The 29th annual Homegrown is scheduled for May 2-9, 2027.

The event grew from featuring 10 local acts in 1999 to a peak of 200 in 2015. The 2027 festival is expected to include roughly 170 acts.

Notable acts that have performed in the festival include: Low, Trampled by Turtles, Charlie Parr, Retribution Gospel Choir, Gaelynn Lea, the Keep Aways, the Black Eyed Snakes, Misisipi Mike Wolf and Haley Bonar.

The event was originally a for-profit venture but became a nonprofit in 2006. Erin Wojciechowski is the festival's executive director.

== Pre-history ==
Duluthian Scott Lunt, known as "DJ Starfire" or simply "Starfire," became a prominent figure in the Duluth music scene in 1997 when he founded Random Radio, an unlicensed low-power station. With about 40 friends volunteering to broadcast shows from his basement in Duluth's East Hillside neighborhood, Lunt became well acquainted with Duluth musicians and traveling musicians, who would perform live on random broadcasts. Lunt made a connection with the NorShor Theatre when it hosted a CD release party assisted by Rick Boo, NorShor manager and local music promoter.

For Lunt's 30th birthday, he invited five acts to play at a private party at Lafayette Square in Duluth's Park Point neighborhood. One of those bands was his own, Father Hennepin, performing for the first time. That event is considered the precursor of the Homegrown Music Festival.

== 1999 ==
In February 1999, Lunt was playing cribbage with friends and reminiscing about his 30th birthday party. During the conversation, he decided to hold another party, this time open to the general public, called the Homegrown Music Festival.

The first Homegrown was held at the NorShor Theatre's Mezzanine Lounge over two nights, attracting about 1,000 people. Ten bands performed: Father Hennepin, Giljunko, Max Dakota, the Black Labels, Amy Abts, Gild, Crazy Betty, Ballyhoo, 2 Sleepy People and the First Ladies.

== 2000 ==
The second annual Homegrown expanded to include 22 acts. The NorShor's main theater opened as a second stage, and acoustic acts played the Fitger's Brewhouse. A third night was added to the festival for the Thursday night Starfire Lounge, during which DJ Starfire spun music by local bands.

This Homegrown is best remembered for sets by the Black Eyed Snakes and Giljunko in the NorShor mezzanine.

Ripsaw reporter David Stein noted that the First Ladies "saved Homegrown from the villain Hu Phlung Pu and his evil minions in hand-to-hand combat that spilled off the stage and onto the dance floor in a tangle of hula-hoops and toilet paper streams."

Other memorable moments included the Dames opening their set with a kazoo version of "The Star-Spangled Banner," the Black Labels passing out marijuana cigarettes to the audience, Father Hennepin performing with a ten-member choir and Ballyhoo closing the festival with a cover of "Sympathy for the Devil."

This was the first year a kickball game was played between the bands that played on Friday and the bands that played on Saturday. The Saturday Rollers defeated the Friday Rawkers by a score of 7-6.

== 2001 ==
In its third year, Homegrown featured 38 acts at four locations over three nights. Beaner's Central and the Red Lion Lounge were added as venues. This was the first year Charlie Parr and Low played the festival (though Low performed as a two-piece, without bassist Zak Sally). Mayor Gary Doty signed a proclamation declaring Homegrown Music Festival Weekend in the city of Duluth.

== 2002 ==
The fourth Homegrown expanded to include 67 acts playing four nights at eight venues. A change in city law prior to the festival allowed clubs with cabaret licenses to obtain extended hours permits for dancing and live music. This led to a raucous performance by the Black-eyed Snakes at Pizza Lucé during the wee hours of the night/morning featuring what may be the first documented case of crowd surfing at a pizza restaurant.

== 2003 ==
Homegrown expanded to five days in its fifth year and included 77 acts. Notable moments included Scott Lunt shaving his hair into a mohawk, foul-mouthed country singer Brad Nailer playing on the sidewalk in front of the NorShor Theater, and Geek Prom Queen AnnMarie O'Malley crowd-surfing with her crown on.

The Homegrown Kickball Classic was played on a softball field outside Wade Municipal Stadium after the city's parks and recreation director put a stop to plans for the game to be held inside the stadium.

== 2004 ==
The sixth annual Homegrown was the last one organized by Lunt. It was also the first year the number of bands decreased, with a roster of 74 acts. It was also a year that saw the Twin Ports Music and Arts Collective open, providing an all-ages venue.

== 2005 ==
Brothers Tim and Brad Nelson, then publishers of the Ripsaw newspaper, purchased Homegrown from Lunt in 2005 and expanded the festival to include 84 acts.

== 2006 ==
In late 2005, the Nelsons donated Homegrown to the nonprofit Bridge Syndicate, which organized a steering committee to run the festival. Al Sparhawk and Amy Abts were co-chairs of the committee.

Homegrown 2006 featured 115 acts over eight days, including the "farewell performance" of Bone Appetit. For the first time, a free trolley bus shuttled attendees from venue to venue on Friday and Saturday nights. A video festival was added to Homegrown's Monday night lineup.

This was the first year the Homegrown Field Guide was published, following the demise of the Ripsaw newspaper, which had published special issues focused on Homegrown since 2000. The first Homegrown Field Guide featured cover art by Duluth artist Chris Monroe.

In a controversial kickball game, the Saturday bands won for the seventh consecutive year.

== 2007 ==
Duluth City Councilor Don Ness assumed the role of festival director in 2007. The roster of bands grew to 131.

For the first time in Homegrown history, the Friday bands finally defeated the Saturday bands at kickball, winning 4-3.

Ness relinquished his position as festival director following the 2007 festival, announcing he was running for mayor. He won the office that fall and served two terms.

Paul Connolly was appointed by the Homegrown steering committee to replace Ness as director.

The first CD compilation of Homegrown bands was released at the end of 2007. "Homegrown Rawk and/or Roll: Starfire's Mix" included 15 tracks by bands that helped make the festival famous.

== 2008 ==
The tenth annual Homegrown featured 150 bands at 23 venues. Another compilation CD was released late in 2008, "Homegrown Rawk and/or Roll: Lindquist's Mix," with tracks selected by Mark Lindquist. Paul Connolly served his second year as director.

== 2009 ==
The 2009 Homegrown Music Festival featured 141 bands at 22 venues. Homegrown's video festival became the Homegrown Music Video Festival, with a new format of having videographers randomly draw names of songs to make music videos for. This would be Paul Connolley's third and final year as festival director.

== 2010 ==
The 2010 Homegrown Music Festival featured 149 bands performing at 25 venues.

Among the bands reuniting for Homegrown 2010 were the Fromundas and Ballyhoo. Both bands helped transform the local music scene in the late 1990s. The Fromundas had not performed together in 13 years; Ballyhoo had been broken up for eight years.

Shana David-Massett, a pianist who studied at Berkee College of Music in Boston, was appointed by the Homegrown steering committee in the fall of 2009 to replace Connolly as director.

== 2011 ==
Homegrown the 13th featured 156 bands. Highlights included a mid-week show at Clyde Iron Works featuring Trampled by Turtles, a surprise performance by Kim Bullard (backing up Jessica Myshack) and a reunion gig at R.T. Quinlan's by Puddle Wonderful.

== 2012 ==
The 14th Homegrown featured 167 bands, with large weekday shows at Grandma's Sports Garden (featuring the Boomchucks and Big Wave Dave & the Ripples) and Clyde Iron Works (featuring Father Hennepin and Trampled by Turtles).

Walter Raschick was appointed by the Homegrown steering committee to replace David-Massett as director.

== 2013 ==
The 15th anniversary of Homegrown featured 184 acts (173 bands, 10 DJs and one fire-spinning group). 2013 also featured the first "West Duluth Night," featuring acts at Beaner's Central, Mr. D's Bar & Grill, and Player's Sports Bar.

== 2014 ==
Homegrown featured 199 bands in 2014. It was supposed to be 200, but one band cancelled on short notice. Memorable moments included the Black-eyed Snakes performing with Charlie Parr at Clyde Iron Works, the Blasphemists weirding out the regulars at the Gopher Lounge, a bat flying around ominously over the audience at Sacred Heart Music Center during a performance by Low, and Sarah Krueger turning her set at Rex Bar into a dance party.

== 2015 ==
Homegrown featured 200 bands in 2015, including the annual Homegrown Photography Show, Homegrown Music Video Festival, and Homegrown Poetry Showcase, and a first-time performance by members of the Duluth Superior Symphony Orchestra.

== 2016 ==
The 2016 Homegrown was the last organized by Walter Raschick, Homegrown's longest-serving director during its nonprofit era. He held the position for five years, spanning 2012-2016. The 2016 festival included 196 musical acts.

== 2017 ==
In January 2017, Melissa La Tour became Homegrown's director following five years as the festival's volunteer coordinator. La Tour started volunteering at the very first festival and has been involved ever since. In 2017 Homegrown featured 199 bands.

== 2018 ==
The 20th annual Homegrown included an unscheduled surprise Monday-night performance by Trampled by Turtles. It was the band's first show following a 19-month hiatus, and the first time the band had played during Homegrown since 2015.

On Saturday evening a special performance was held at the newly renovated NorShor Theater called "Starfire Tonight: A Homegrown Jam." The event opened with a comedic sketch about Homegrown in the year 2073 starring Scott "Starfire" Lunt, Bryan "Lefty" Johnson and Rick Boo. Bands performing short sets on the NorShor's main stage were Father Hennepin, Aby Abts, Ballyhoo, the Little Black Books with Tina Ludwig on vocals, Jerree Small with Marc Gartman, and Toby Thomas Churchill with Danny Cosgrove.

Following the festival, Homegrown partnered with Greater Downtown Council to provide local music at Duluth's Lake Place Park. This event happened on the five Thursdays of August and was free to the public.

== 2019 ==
Homegrown expanded into Duluth’s burgeoning Lincoln Park Craft District in 2019 with shows at new businesses like the Caddy Shack, Duluth Cider, Ursa Minor and Duluth Folk School, along with established venues like Bent Paddle Brewing, Lake Superior Brewing and Clyde Iron Works.

The schedule for Homegrown 21 included nearly 190 bands at more than 40 venues.

== 2020 ==
All public events related to the 22nd annual Homegrown were cancelled due to the COVID-19 pandemic. Numerous online performances took place during the week, with musicians occasionally referring to the festival as "StayHomegrown." The annual photography, poetry and music video showcases were displayed online.

== 2021 ==
The 23rd annual Homegrown was held online with a series of video releases.

== 2022 ==
Homegrown returned to in-person events in its 24th year. A total of 189 acts performed at 45 venues.

The festival started with the Children's Music Showcase at the Duluth Public Library Plaza and Duluth Depot. It ended at the library plaza with a special performance by Gaelynn Lea.

A new venue involved with Homegrown was the DECC Harborside Ballroom, with a "secret show" held in the nearby Symphony Hall. The secret show was a reunion performance by Cars & Trucks, a band that had not played together since 2015. Both the band and audience were all on the stage. No one was in the seats.

== 2023 ==
The 25th annual Homegrown featured 171 acts at 36 venues.

== 2024 ==
The 26th annual Homegrown featured 162 acts at 35 venues.
