= Andrew Olaf Devold =

American politician

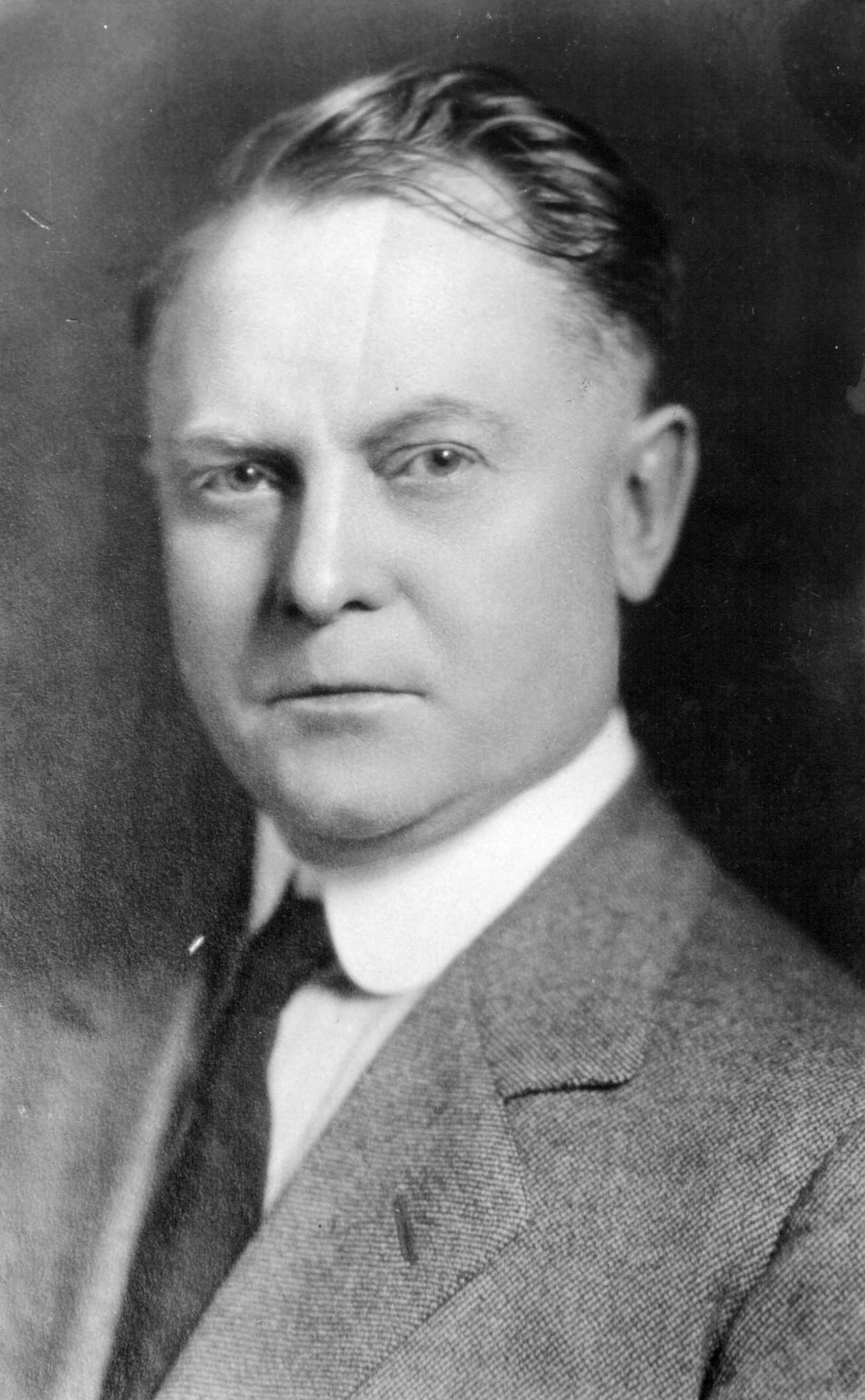
- Devold c. 1935

Member of the Minnesota Senate from the 32nd district
- In office January 5, 1931 – December 12, 1939
- In office January 6, 1919 – January 2, 1927

Member of the Minnesota House of Representatives from the 32nd district
- In office January 4, 1915 – January 5, 1919

Personal details
- Born: November 17, 1881 Stockholm, Sweden
- Died: December 12, 1939 (aged 58) Minneapolis, Minnesota, U.S.
- Party: Socialist (before 1918); Farmer–Labor (after 1918)
- Spouse: Catherine Novak (m. 1925)
- Education: University of Minnesota
- Occupation: Printer, politician

Andrew Olaf "Andy" "A.O." Devold (November 17, 1881 – December 12, 1939) was a Norwegian-American printer and politician who served several terms in both houses of the Minnesota Legislature between 1915 and 1939.

== Career ==
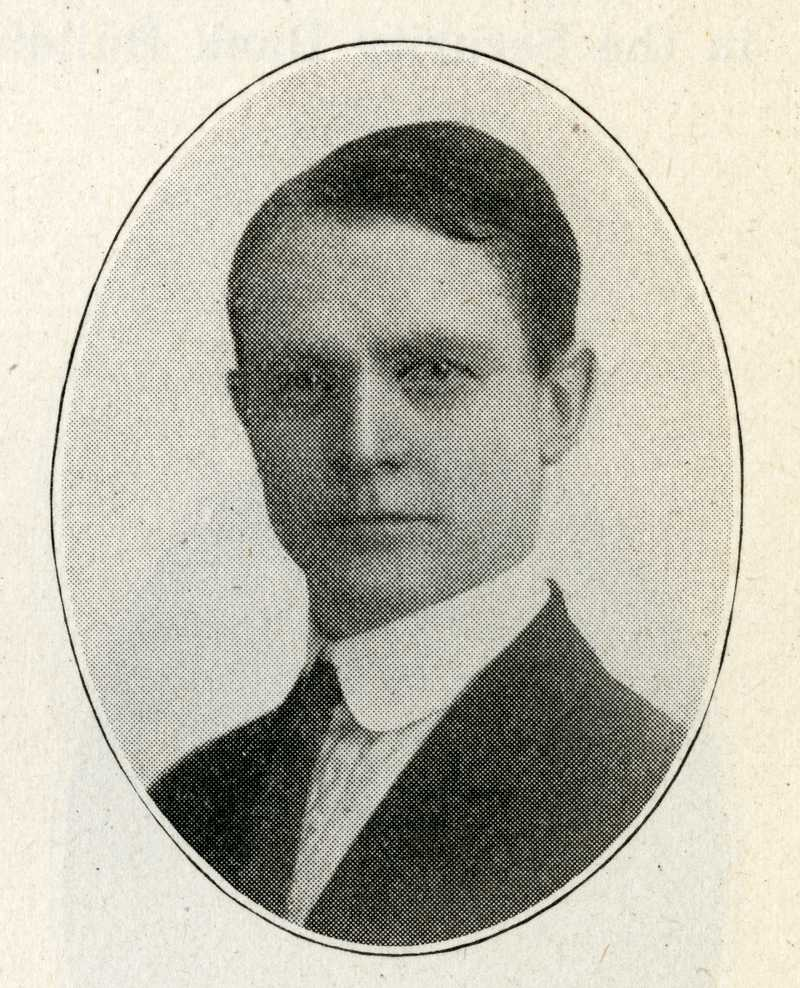
Devold's official State House portrait, 1915

Devold was born November 17, 1881, in Stockholm, Sweden, immigrating to the United States at the age of 12. Despite being born in Sweden, he was a Norwegian, as were both of his parents. His parents, Helle and Emil Mengeshoel, were editors of the newspaper Gaa Paa.

He served in the Minnesota House of Representatives from 1915 to 1918 and in the Minnesota Senate from 1919 to 1926 and again from 1931 until his death. First elected on the ticket of the Socialist Party, he played a key role in founding the Minnesota Farmer–Labor Party. Devold was one of only two members of the House of Representatives to vote against the creation of the dictatorial Minnesota Commission of Public Safety, the other being Ernest Strand.

He died in Minneapolis, Minnesota on December 12, 1939, age 58 years.
