= Twin Ports Music and Arts Collective =

The Twin Ports Music and Arts Collective commonly referred to as "The MAC", was an all-ages venue in Duluth, Minnesota from 2004 to 2005. The organization was formed by a group of 10 musicians and artists from the Duluth/Superior area who saw the growing need for an open, non-genre specific, performance and gallery space. After originally considering moving into an empty space beneath Duluth's Electric Fetus, The MAC found more conducive space in a 3,000 sq ft (280 m^{2}) building that was once home to the Minnesota Ballet. The space was large enough to support two performance stages, a large "green room" area, and an impressive amount of wall and floor space for art installations. The young organization raised its initial startup funds by holding two benefit concerts featuring such bands as Trampled By Turtles, The Black Eyed Snakes, and The Dames, as well as from generous donations from supportive community members including then Mayor Herb Bergson.

In its short lifespan, The MAC played host to over 250 bands and performers, both local and national, including Low, Calvin Johnson, and Magnolia Electric Co. It was also an all-ages venue in the sixth annual Homegrown Music Festival in 2004. In addition, The MAC gallery showed the works of 10 local artists on its spacious walls throughout the year it was open.

The venue was forced to close its doors in January 2005, due to a growing decline in admission and participation by its founding members.
