= John L. Morrison =

John Loyal Morrison (September 10, 1863 – May 18, 1926) was an American newspaper publisher who founded the controversial Duluth, Minnesota newspaper Ripsaw. His editorial attacks on area politicians were so unrelenting that a state law was passed specifically to shut down his paper. The legal battle that followed led to a landmark Supreme Court decision affirming the unconstitutionality of prior restraint laws.

== Early years ==
Morrison was born in Tabor, Iowa, the first of five children by Joshua L. Morrison and Martha Abigail Gardner. The Morrisons were a fundamentalist Christian family. Every morning, after breakfast, they held a family worship, and John and his siblings were all taught to abstain from alcohol, smoking and gambling.

After graduating from Tabor College, Morrison went to work teaching school in Western, Nebraska. While in Western, he published the first Ripsaw newspaper. He is also believed to have published similar papers, or at least worked in the journalism field, in Missouri and Montana, as well as Crete, Friend and DeWitt, Nebraska.

From 1889 to 1890, Morrison was in Kansas City, where he worked as a police reporter for the Kansas City Daily Times.

He came to Duluth in 1893, and that fall he was hired as a reporter for the Duluth Evening Herald. After seven months at the Herald, he joined the paper's new organized labor department as an editor, attending and reporting on labor functions for two years.

Morrison became a regularly elected honorary member of the Trades Assembly, and, in the spring of 1895, was asked to speak at an executive meeting about the boycott of the Imperial Mill's flour products. He spoke critically of B. C. Church, president of the mill. According to Morrison, that made Church "very angry, as autocrats usually are when a commoner criticizes them." Church allegedly demanded Morrison be discharged from the Herald, threatening to cancel his advertising in the paper. Morrison's employment at the Herald was, indeed, swiftly terminated.

Just as swiftly, Morrison was hired as editor of the labor department at the Duluth News Tribune. He held the position until News Tribune manager A. E. Chantler's contract expired in January 1896. The new manager, A. F. Hammond, quickly fired Morrison, refusing, according to Morrison, to give any reason.

Morrison took an active part in Henry Truelsen's successful 1896 campaign for Duluth mayor. Truelsen's candidacy was opposed by both daily papers and corporate interests, which strongly backed conservative candidate Charles Allen.

In 1896, Morrison also briefly published a paper called the Duluth Citizen. After Truelsen's election, however, Morrison left Duluth, returning to Kansas City. What he did there and how long he stayed is unknown, but his consistent listing in the Duluth city directory suggests it was a short move.

Over the next 10 years, Morrison changed careers frequently and lived mostly in hotel rooms. The city directory listed him as a "correspondent" for the Herald in 1897. The next year he was listed as a travel agent, and, by 1900, he was a "correspondent" again, but no employer is mentioned.

During the early 1900s, Morrison was listed in the directory as a reporter, travel agent, real estate man, broker, secretary of the Dividend Development Company, messenger for William Mies and, from 1908 to 1910, a "prospector." Following that, his listing reads either "mining" or "mines and mining" through 1916. What exactly Morrison's involvement was with the mining industry throughout those years is unclear, although one account in the Duluth Herald reports he was "engaged in newspaper work for mining journals."

In 1916, Morrison returned to publishing with his first and only book, The Booster Book: West Duluth in 1916.

== The Ripsaw ==
Morrison's Duluth Ripsaw debuted on March 24, 1917. Issues were published every other Saturday, although on more than one occasion Morrison was overwhelmed by the task of producing the paper by himself, and took three weeks to finish a new issue, working almost entirely by himself.

"The Ripsaw is a genuine one-man sawmill," he wrote in the July 13, 1918 editorial. "The entire work, snaking out dead-heads, filing the saw, piling the product, getting it to the market, even loading and billing it, falls on one man. It often takes 18 hours a day and seven days a week to do all that half way creditably, to say nothing of brilliantly."

Morrison's specialty was digging into the "unholy and undesirable alliance" between lawmakers and lawbreakers. During the Ripsaw's first year, Duluth Chief of Police Robert McKercher and City Auditor "King" Odin Halden were both ousted from their positions after being labeled crooked by Morrison.

== Criminal libel ==
In 1924, Morrison took on state Sen. Mike Boylan, Cass County Probate Judge Bert Jamison and former Hibbing mayor Victor L. Power. Jamison and Power both quickly sought to have Morrison jailed for libel. Boylan's revenge came later.

Morrison wrote that Jamison had acquired syphilis at a brothel, but numerous affidavits from hospitals and doctors indicated Jamison's 12 surgeries were due to glandular troubles caused by tuberculosis, not syphilis. Morrison was found guilty and sentenced to 90 days in the Cass County jail, but raised bail and returned to Duluth pending appeal. Alfred Lambert, the source of Morrison's story, was also tried for slander and criminal libel, and sentenced to 30 days in the county jail.

Power sued Morrison during his 1924 campaign for Congress. Morrison had accused Power of taking money from undesirable clients, then abandoning them. He also quoted Mesabi Hotel employees who told him Power had one night "crawled into bed so beastly drunk ... that he used his couch as a privy or puking place entirely without the help of cathartic or emetic."

Power claimed Morrison's article was written for the sole purpose of injuring him politically. He told the Duluth News Tribune he was going against the advice of his campaign committee by bringing up the charges against Morrison before the election. He alleged the Ripsaw article was "instigated by the opposition camp," and that Morrison was the advertising manager of his opponent. Furthermore, he suggested that Morrison was "preparing extra copies of his paper to be delivered to the opposition for special circulation." Power vowed to have anyone who circulated the Ripsaw arrested, saying those who circulate the paper "are as liable to the same prosecution as the publisher."

Power lost the congressional election, and his trial against Morrison began on Dec. 3, 1924. State Rep. George Lommen was the first to take the witness stand on Power's behalf. Morrison had attacked Lommen in the past, accusing him of collecting bribes from the operators of slot machines, as well as declaring that he was such a flip-flopping "political chameleon," he would probably end up a Communist.

Lommen accused Morrison of bringing forth the libelous attacks because he and Power had not bought enough political advertising in the Ripsaw.

Morrison's trial was the longest in Hibbing, Minnesota history at the time. In the end, after five hours of deliberating, the jury found Morrison guilty. He was sentenced to 90 days in the county workhouse. He immediately appealed.

On June 1, 1925, Morrison was ordered to make a public apology to Power. Morrison told the court and Power that he was sorry if the Ripsaw "had cost Mayor Power the election." The charges against Morrison were dropped and his sentence rescinded.

Later that month, Morrison pleaded guilty to the charges of criminal libel brought by Jamison. Judge W. S. McClennehan reduced the sentence to a $100 fine, which so pleased Morrison that he attempted to make a speech thanking the judge. McClennehan pounded his fist on his desk and admonished Morrison. "I don't think any more of you, sir, than I do this damn desk," he shouted.

== Minnesota Gag Law ==
In the summer of 1925, Sen. Boylan worked with Rep. Lommen to draft several bills that would allow the suppression of scandalous newspapers. Senator Freyling Stevens, a powerful lawyer, introduced the Senate version of what would become known as the "Minnesota Gag Law," which made publishers of "malicious, scandalous and defamatory" newspapers guilty of creating a public nuisance, and allowed a single judge, without jury, to stop a newspaper or magazine from publishing, a practice known legally as "prior restraint", since it in effect declares the publisher to be guilty of libel even prior to the allegedly libellous material having ever appeared in print circulation, and suppresses its appearance.

In the April 6, 1926, Ripsaw, Morrison attacked Minneapolis Mayor George Emerson Leach and Duluth Commissioner of Public Utilities W. Harlow Tischer. A temporary restraining order was quickly placed on the Ripsaw by State District Judge H. J. Grannis of Duluth.

Morrison was set to appear in court on May 15, 1926, but he fell ill. Three days later he was rushed to St. Francis Hospital in Superior at around 1am. Nine hours later, he was pronounced dead. The cause was reported in the Herald to be an embolism, a blood clot on the brain. The Herald reported that Morrison "had been ill for 10 days, suffering from pleurisy following an attack of influenza, a general breakdown and attacks of syncope."

== Aftermath ==
Morrison's funeral at Bell Brothers Mortuary in West Duluth was well-attended. Mayor Samuel Snively and City Commissioner W. S. McCormick eulogized Morrison as a good man. His body was sent back to his birthplace, Tabor, Iowa. Morrison's wife, Nora, was 49 when he died. They had two children: John L. Jr., who died a few years after his father, and Mattie Bell, who went on to have a successful career in politics in the Chicago area.

Tischer continued to insist the injunction against the Ripsaw be maintained, even after Morrison's death. Judge E. J. Kenney, however, allowed a continuation of the paper, but without its "head sawyer," the paper ceased.

In 1927, the gag law was used to shut down the Saturday Press, an anti-Semitic, anti-gangster scandal sheet in Minneapolis. This gave rise to Near v. Minnesota, a pivotal Supreme Court decision that struck down the Public Nuisance Law on June 1, 1931.
