= Chris Monroe =

American cartoonist, illustrator, and author of weekly comic strip, Violet Days

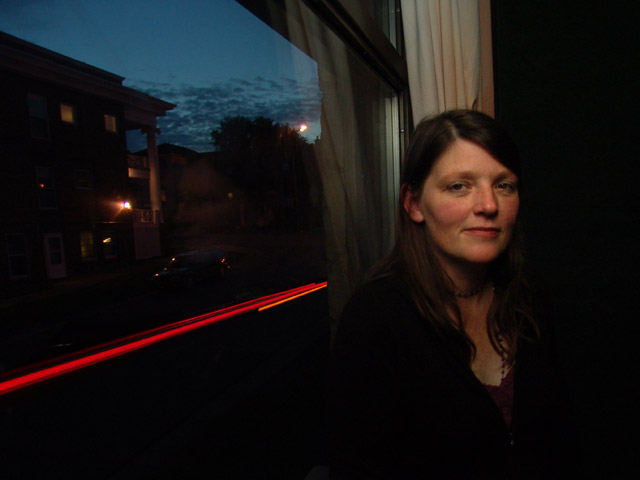
- Chris Monroe in 2009
- Born: Christine Monroe; April 17, 1962 (age 64); Duluth, Minnesota, U.S.
- Occupations: Cartoonist, Author, Illustrator
- Known for: Violet Days comic strip

Christine Monroe (born April 17, 1962) is an American cartoonist, illustrator, and author best known for her children’s book series “Monkey With A Tool Belt.” She created the weekly comic strip “Violet Days,” which appeared in the Minneapolis Star Tribune and Duluth News Tribune. "Violet Days" began in 1996 and ran weekly for 22 years. Her comic has been published in Funny Times, Ripsaw, the Funny Pages, Zenith City Arts, Madcap, Twin Cities Reader, City Pages, Pulse of the Twin Cities, Transistor, and Ruminator. An anthology of her comic strips, “Ultra Violet: 10 Years of Violet Days” was published in 2004.

Monroe has written and illustrated twelve children's books, including the Monkey with a Tool Belt series. She has also illustrated seven books for other authors, including Jane Yolen’s “Trash Mountain” and two books with author Kevin Kling. Kirkus Reviews wrote of her book, Sneaky Sheep (2010), "The silly antics will tickle young readers, who will want to visit with these daring sheep again and again. Fun for all." Her picture book series “Monkey With A Tool Belt” has been adapted into the Netflix series “Chico Bon Bon: Monkey With A Tool Belt,” which premiered in 2020 and currently has four seasons on the platform.

She has exhibited her oil pastel drawings and comics at the Duluth Art Institute, Tweed Museum of Art, Rifle Sport Gallery, WARM, Katherine E. Nash Gallery, Palazzo Sclafani, and other galleries, coffee shops, and dimly lit hallways...

== Personal life ==
Monroe was born and raised in Duluth, Minnesota. She graduated from the Minneapolis College of Art and Design. She lived in the Twin Cities area from 1980 to 1998, before returning to Duluth. She has a son, Michael Winslow Sweere.

== Awards and honors ==
In 1999, City Pages named her Best Local Cartoonist, writing: “Monroe's scratchy, winsome Violet Days meanders through everyday topics: the merits of various candies, the habits of squirrels, the shoplifting rituals of young girls. And each quick meditation is delivered with a deadpan tone that indicates a sharp wit honed against life's frailties and absurdities." She is the recipient of the 2015 George Morrison Award for excellence in art. In 2016, she won an Emmy Award for her animation artwork for "Kevin Kling: Lost And Found," a documentary produced by TPT. She has been voted "Best Local Artist," "Best Local Author," and "Best Local Cartoonist" multiple times in The Duluth News Tribune and Northland Reader. Her children's books are in five languages and have won over a dozen international awards. In 2017 she was inducted into the Duluth East High School Hall Of Fame.

== Bibliography ==
- Ultra Violet: Ten Years of "Violet Days"
- Monkey with a Tool Belt
- Monkey with a Tool Belt and the Noisy Problem
- Monkey with a Tool Belt and the Seaside Shenanigans
- Sneaky Sheep
- Cookie The Walker
- Bug On A Bike
- Monkey With A Tool Belt and the Maniac Muffins
- Monkey With A Tool Belt and the Silly School Mystery
- Monkey With A Tool Belt Blasts Off!
- Monkey With A Tool Belt and the Craftiest Christmas Ever!

=== As illustrator ===
- Big Little Brother by Kevin Kling
- Totally Uncool by Janice Levy
- Big Little Mother by Kevin Kling
- Trash Mountain by Jane Yolen
