= Duluth News Tribune =

Newspaper in Duluth, Minnesota

Coordinates: 46.783132°N 92.104751°W

- Front page from April 27, 2018
- Type: Daily newspaper
- Format: Broadsheet
- Owner: Forum Communications
- Publisher: Neal Ronquist
- Editor: Rick Lubbers
- Founded: 1869
- Language: American English
- Headquarters: 424 W. First St. Duluth, Minnesota 55802
- City: Duluth
- Country: United States
- Circulation: 22,695 (as of 2024)
- ISSN: 0896-9418
- OCLC number: 17221576
- Website: duluthnewstribune.com

The Duluth News Tribune (known locally as The Tribune or DNT) is a newspaper based in Duluth, Minnesota. While circulation is heaviest in the Twin Ports metropolitan area, delivery extends into northeastern Minnesota, northwestern Wisconsin, and Michigan's Upper Peninsula. The paper has a limited distribution in Thunder Bay, Ontario. The News Tribune has been owned by Forum Communications since 2006.

== History ==
The present incarnation of the Duluth News Tribune is the outcome of the merger and takeover of several earlier publications. Duluth's first weekly newspaper, The Duluth Minnesotian, was first published by Dr. Thomas Preston Foster, an editor of the St. Paul Minnesotian, on April 24, 1869. After a year of The Duluth Minnesotian publishing unfavorable articles about city services and local politics, Duluth's Mayor Joshua Carter and local investor Jay Cooke invited the owner of Superior, Wisconsin's Superior Tribune to move his paper across the canal to Duluth. This owner, Robert C. Mitchell, published the renamed Duluth Tribune on May 4, 1870. The Duluth Tribune was soon renamed the Duluth Daily Tribune. Meanwhile, The Duluth Minnesotian merged with another local newspaper, the Duluth Weekly Herald, to become The Duluth Minnesotian-Herald in 1875, later dropping "Minnesotian" to become an evening paper, The Duluth Herald.

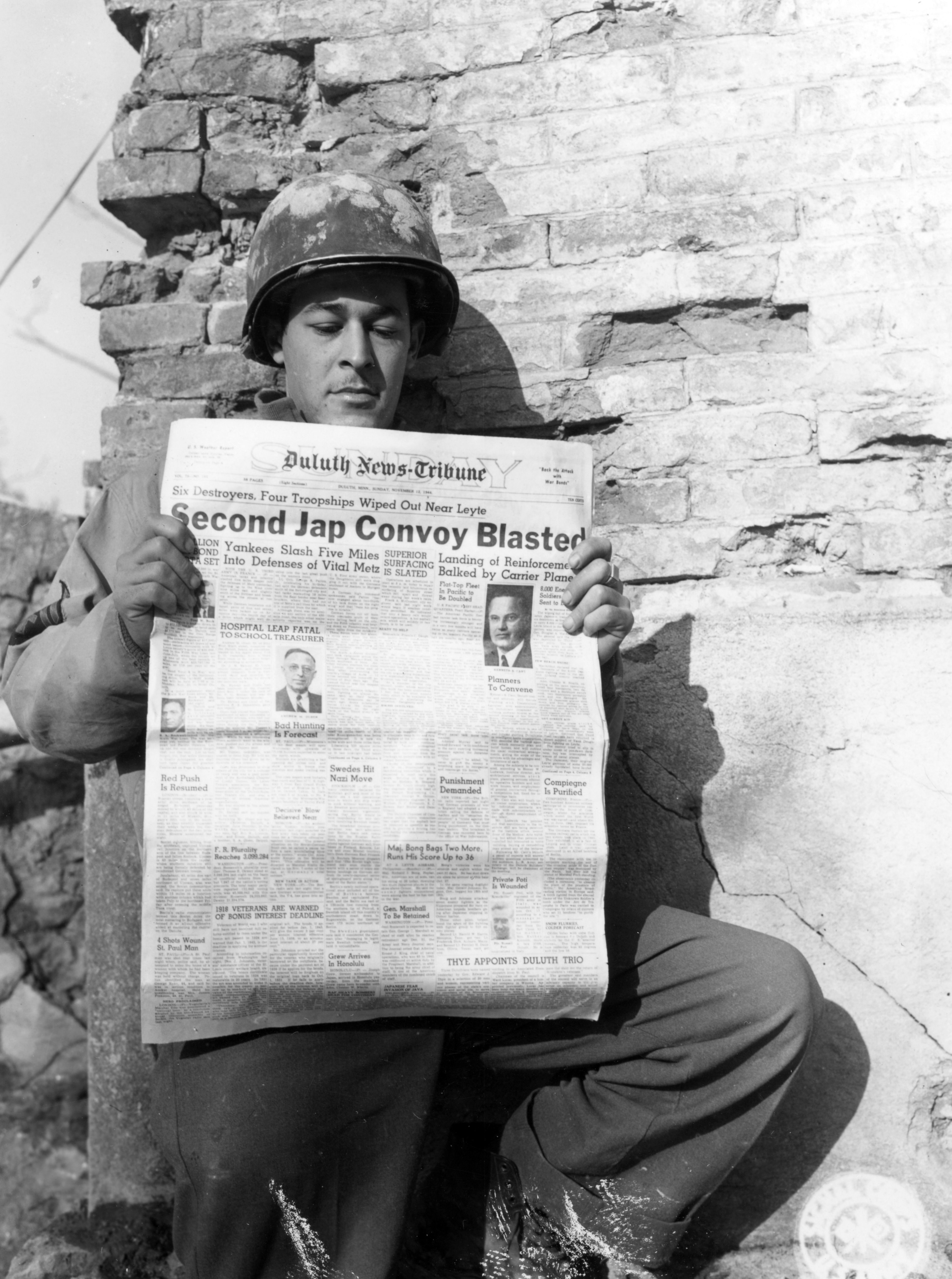
A U.S. soldier reads the Duluth News Tribune while serving in Italy, January 26, 1945

The first News-Tribune was created as a result of the merger of the Duluth Tribune and another daily paper, the Duluth News in 1892. In 1929, this morning paper was purchased by The Duluth Herald. Ridder Publications, later renamed Knight Ridder Inc., bought both papers in 1936. The pair were merged in 1982 to form the News-Tribune & Herald, shortened simply to Duluth News-Tribune in 1988. In 2000, the hyphen was omitted, leaving Duluth News Tribune as the paper's title.

In 2006, The McClatchy Company purchased Knight Ridder Inc., acquiring the Duluth News Tribune in the process. The McClatchy Company decided to sell 12 of Knight Ridder's 32 daily newspapers, including the Duluth News Tribune and Minneapolis' Star Tribune, due to a company acquisition philosophy limiting purchases to "newspapers in fast-growing markets." Forum Communications, a Fargo-based media firm, announced the purchase of the News Tribune on June 7, 2006. Forum Communications publishes a number of newspapers in the region, including The Forum of Fargo-Moorhead, the Rochester Post Bulletin and the Grand Forks Herald.

The Duluth News Tribune is available daily in an on-line form, and is printed twice weekly for mail delivery on Wednesdays and Saturdays.

== Notable people ==
- Chris Monroe – cartoonist of weekly comic strip Violet Days (Monroe retired the comic in February 2018.)
- John L. Morrison – reporter at Duluth Evening Herald and labor department editor at Duluth News Tribune
- Robert Ridder – reporter at Tribune, later a director of Knight Ridder media
- Robin Washington – journalist and Duluth News Tribune executive editor from 2010 to 2014

== See also ==
- List of newspapers in Minnesota
