= Hunger Makes Me a Modern Girl =

2015 memoir by Carrie Brownstein

- Book cover
- Author: Carrie Brownstein
- Audio read by: Carrie Brownstein
- Language: English
- Genre: Memoir
- Published: October 27, 2015
- Publisher: Virago Press (UK), Riverhead Books (US)
- Pages: 244
- ISBN: 1594486638
- OCLC: 904421445

Hunger Makes Me a Modern Girl is a 2015 memoir by Carrie Brownstein, a member of the band Sleater-Kinney. Named for one of her lyrics, the book is about her life in and around music. The book starts with her as a hyper-performative young nerd who runs for vice president of her Washington state elementary school. The story goes on to cover Brownstein's escape from a turbulent family life into a world where music was the means toward self-invention, community, and rescue. Along the way, Brownstein chronicles the excitement and contradictions within the era's flourishing and fiercely independent music subculture, including experiences that sowed the seeds for the observational satire of the popular television series Portlandia years later.

== Publication history ==
Brownstein published the 256-page memoir with Riverhead, an imprint of Penguin Group, on October 27, 2015.

== Reception ==
The book received largely positive reviews. In The Guardian, Michelle Dean compared Brownstein's writing to her band Sleater-Kinney's "intensity", saying "Brownstein’s book has a similarly fierce approach," and felt that even if "there are certainly places where an editor could and should have chiseled her prose down to make her points sharper and more affecting, this book is the clear product of a very intelligent person, and filled with flashes of insight and wit." In The New York Times, John Williams contrasted the tone of Hunger with Brownstein's work in Sleater-Kinney:

readers who have...thrilled to Ms. Brownstein's supremely confident antics onstage...may be disappointed by this memoir's nearly incessant tone of self-deprecation...But Ms. Brownstein is interested in telling us who she is — and how she sees herself — without a guitar in her hands. "I was relieved that music had done exactly what I had always wanted it to do," she writes in this both candid and evasive book, "which was turn me into someone else."

Sarah Jaffe also noted the conflict between candor and evasiveness in Hunger:

The book is spare and arching like a stripped-down rock song, but it rarely has the rawness Sleater-Kinney fans might expect. Running throughout is the tension between wanting to be seen and wanting to hide, wanting to reveal and wanting to retreat, wanting to tell but wanting to decide how much.

== Television adaptation ==
Brownstein was set to adapt her memoir into a half-hour television pilot, entitled Search and Destroy, for streaming service Hulu. She was set to write, direct, and executive produce alongside Megan Ellison, Sue Naegle, and Ali Krug. The pilot was being produced by Annapurna Pictures. On March 8, 2018, it was announced that Taylor Dearden and Aubrey Peeples had been cast in the show's lead roles. On May 18, 2018, it was reported that Brad Morris, Leah Harvey, Jessica Hecht, and Imogen Tear had joined the main cast.

It was announced on February 11, 2019, that Hulu would not be going forward with the series.

== See also ==
- Riot grrrl
