= Black Eyed Snakes =

The Black-eyed Snakes

Background information
- Origin: Duluth, Minnesota, U.S.
- Genres: Blues, rock
- Instrument(s): Vocals, guitar, drums,
- Years active: 1999 – present
- Labels: Chairkickers' Union Music, Shaky Ray Records, Varese Fontana
- Members: Alan Sparhawk; Bob Olson; Brad Nelson; Bryan "Lefty" Johnson
- Website: www.chairkickers.com

The Black-eyed Snakes is an American blues rock band from Duluth, Minnesota. Since releasing their debut album "It's the Black-eyed Snakes" in 2001, the band has toured the U.S., including with Charlie Parr, among others. Front man Alan Sparhawk also performs with Low and Retribution Gospel Choir.

The Black-eyed Snakes often perform at the Homegrown Music Festival in Duluth, Minnesota. Black-eyed Snakes was selected by City Pages as the Best New Band of 2001. Sparhawks described the band's attitude towards the blues: "We actually hate most blues. We were trying to destroy it. We're interested in putting the blues back into a gut level – instead of talent, we go with feeling more."

== Lineup ==
- Alan Sparhawk – guitar, vocals
- Bob Olson – guitar
- Brad Nelson – drums
- Justin Sparhawk – percussion
- Bryan "Lefty" Johnson – percussion

== Discography ==
=== Studio albums ===
- It's the Black-eyed Snakes – (Chairkickers' Union Music, 2001)
- Rise Up! – (Chairkickers' Union Music, 2003)
- Seven Horses - (Chairkickers' Union Music, 2018)

=== Singles ===
- "Chicken Bone George" (7") – (Shaky Ray Records, 2001)

=== Compilations ===
- Duluth Does Dylan – (Spinout Records, 2000)
- Sun Records the Ultimate Blues Collection – (Varese Fontana, 2003)
- Perverted by Mark E. / A Tribute to the Fall – (Zick Zack indigo, 2004)
- Homegrown Rawk and/or Roll: Starfire's Mix – (Homegrown Music Festival, 2008)

=== DVDs ===
- "Cross Country with the Snakes" (film by Hansi Johnson) – (Chairkickers' Union Music, 2005)
