= Gaa Paa =

Defunct American Norwegian-language newspaper

Gaa Paa!
- Section of the front page of the August 18, 1917 issue of Gaa Paa!
- Type: Weekly
- Publisher: E.L. Mengshoel
- Founded: 1903
- Ceased publication: 1918
- Language: Norwegian
- Headquarters: Girard, Kansas
- City: Girard
- Country: United States
- Readership: Minneapolis, Minnesota, Girard, Kansas
- OCLC number: 10828806

Gaa Paa! ("Forward!" or literally "Go On!") was a Norwegian-language newspaper, important for its role in promoting socialism to a Scandinavian immigrant audience in the United States in the early 20th century. It was established at Girard, Kansas in November 1903, and moved to Minneapolis, Minnesota the following year.

The Norwegian-language press played an important role in society as one of the main vehicles of communication and education. Between 1865 and 1914, 565 papers and magazines existed in the United States, with newspapers founded in every large town where Norwegians lived and in many small towns as well. Gaa Paa was particularly notable because it lasted for over two decades which was a long run in the world of left-wing papers of the time.

The Norwegian-American press served immigrants who could not yet read English and was a source of cultural life for those immigrants who were most comfortable reading and speaking their mother tongue, as well as a way to keep cultural ties alive for the next generation. The papers covered a broad range of topics; educating readers on the history and government of their new country; commenting on local agricultural news and on news from Europe and Norway; entertaining with poems and literature, and acting as organs for a variety of political views.

In the case of Gaa Paa, its socialist views came under scrutiny in the World War I period and it changed its name in 1918 in an effort to avoid a ban from the US Mail, taking the name Folkets Røst (People's Voice). It appeared under that title until October 1925. Its demise coincided with the aging of the socialist couple who published the paper for over two decades, Helle and Emil Mengshoel.

In the aftermath of the 1919 split of the Socialist Party of America (SPA) which led to the establishment of the Communist Party of America (CPA) and Communist Labor Party of America (CLP), Folkets Røst remained allied with the social democratic SPA and promoted the candidacies of other like-minded groups. The weekly newspaper was the largest and longest-running radical Dano-Norwegian (Bokmål) periodical in North America.

== Publication history ==
=== Establishment ===
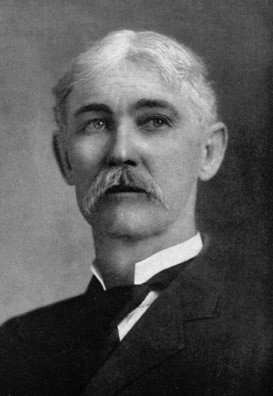
Julius A. Wayland (1854-1912), first publisher and financial angel of Gaa Paa.

In 1903, Julius A. Wayland, publisher of the national weekly Appeal to Reason, decided to launch a Norwegian-language socialist newspaper from his base of operations at Girard, Kansas, a small town located in the southeastern part of the state. Wayland's paper made the small farming community into a “Mecca for Socialism” according to one author. Wayland realized that many Scandinavian immigrants were disposed to join the socialist movement and he wanted to recruit them to the socialist cause.

Wayland invited the married socialist activists Emil Lauritz Mengshoel and Helle Crøger Mengshoel to relocate to Kansas to edit this new publication.

Wayland had met Emil Mengshoel — the editor of the radical Minnesota Populist newspaper Nye Normanden (New Norseman) — though his prior contributions to the Appeal to Reason, making him a logical choice for the editorial desk. Helle Crøger Mengshoel was a formidable activist in her own right, having worked previously as a trade union organizer in Christiania, Norway (today's Oslo). She was friends with many prominent Norwegian socialists and some of her letters are available through the archives of the Norwegian-American Historical Society. The couple assented to Wayland's request, moved to Kansas, and on November 29, 1903, the first issue of Gaa Paa (Forward) rolled from the Appeal's presses.

Burdened by other tasks, Wayland soon decided to step down from his direct role as publisher of Gaa Paa, instead subsidizing publication of the paper through direct donations. The paper continued to be edited by the Mengshoels, joined by Helle Mengshoel's son, Andrew Olaf Devold, to make an editorial board of three. Throughout its history Gaa Paa would remain, in the words of historian Odd S. Lovoll, "basically a family venture".

In the fall of 1904, the paper was moved to Minneapolis, closer to its primary readership in the Norwegian immigrant communities of the Upper Midwest, where it would remain for the next two decades. The move was completed during the second half of October 1904, with offices established at 1910 East Franklin Avenue in Minneapolis, in the heart of the Scandinavian enclave in the Twin Cities. There, the paper was close to advertisers and could form mutually beneficial relationships with socialist organizations.

=== Development ===
Gaa Paa publishers and editors Helle and Emil Mengshoel as they appeared in 1899.

Gaa Paa was bolstered by the establishment of the Scandinavian Socialist Federation (Skandinaviske Socialistforbund) in 1910, a national organization which united local Swedish, Norwegian, and Danish language socialist clubs scattered around the United States. The organization of the disparate groups helped Gaa Paa's position as the only Dano-Norwegian (Bokmål) socialist weekly, but in 1911, the paper soon was challenged when the Scandinavian Federation launched its own publication, Social-Demokraten (The Social Democrat). A feud developed between the privately owned and the Federation-owned papers as they battled for subscribers in a fairly limited market.

Gaa Paa was regarded by one contemporary observer as "the reddest and most radical of Norwegian newspapers," touting itself on its masthead as the "Organ for Scandinavian Workers in America." The paper based its editorial line upon the principles of International Socialism, with emphasis placed on the notion of class struggle.

Despite its purple prose, however, the paper steered far away from the anti-political industrial union the Industrial Workers of the World (IWW), explicitly disavowing that organization's commitment to the use of the tactics of sabotage and direct action. Rather than holding to an apocalyptic view of attaining socialism through armed revolution, editor Mengshoel was influenced by the ideas of writers Laurence Gronlund and Edward Bellamy, emphasizing the functional superiority of the economic form of state ownership and the implication that evolution to socialist production and distribution would be a protracted, inevitable, evolutionary process. In other words, the Mengshoels believed that by educating workers about the benefits of capitalism, socialism would prevail by peaceful means - at the ballot box.

Gaa Paa attained a circulation of 5,000 in 1912 and managed to maintain a largely stable readership of about 4,500 during the years up to American entry into World War I. Gaa Paa had a national readership and published work by writers from Norway to North Dakota well as from enclaves of Norwegian-American radicalism located in Seattle and Astoria, Oregon. The paper also opened a business office in the Midwestern ethnic metropolis of Chicago.

In 1914, Andrew Devold, (Helle Mengshoel's son from her first marriage) threw his hat into the political ring on the Socialist Party ticket and won election to the Minnesota state legislature. He became the second Socialist elected to that body in the state. Devold was at the time listed as editor and publisher of Gaa Paa together with his stepfather, Emil Mengshoel. After leaving Gaa Paa in 1917, Devold went on to win election to the Minnesota State Senate in November 1918. He held public office continuously from 1914 until his death in office in 1939. His legislative work focused on passing labor laws, and he is credited as authoring the first universal eight-hour law.

=== Wartime repression ===
In an effort to dodge a prohibition from the US Mail, Gaa Paa was forced to change its name to Folkets Røst in 1918.

In contrast to the overwhelming majority of the Norwegian-American press, Gaa Paa maintained an anti-war orientation even after American entry into World War I in April 1917. While taking a position of "undiscriminating hate" of "German junkerdom, English aristocracy, and American money power," primary editor Emil Mengshoel expressed sympathy for Minneapolis socialists who dared to resist conscription. The paper never was so bold as to explicitly advocate resistance to registration and the draft, instead attempting to toe the fine line of legality while remaining true to the anti-militarist St. Louis proclamation of the Socialist Party of America.

As with other non-English publications, Gaa Paa was also faced with the burdensome task of supplying English translations of all political articles and editorial comments during the wartime years. Efforts to soften tone and comply with statutory regulations in order to appease federal authorities proved inadequate for Postmaster General Albert S. Burleson, however, and in 1918 Gaa Paa was denied access to the United States mails. This proved a harsh blow to the financially unstable publication, threatening its survival.

In an effort to keep the publishing operation alive, the Mengshoels resorted to an artifice widely used to beat European censorships, relaunching their publication with a new name, Folkets Røst (People's Voice) — a name regarded as one less militant than Gaa Paa. The old publication was shut down in October 1918 with the ostensibly "new" paper first seeing print on December 21, 1918, following a pause in publication of some two months.

=== Socialist split of 1919 ===
Gaa Paa moved away from the Socialist Party slightly in the spring of 1918, when it began printing columns written by Sigvald Rødvick, top Norwegian-language official in the national office of the Non-Partisan League (NPL), a rival organization. The publication lent its editorial support not only to the Socialist Party candidacy of former editor Andrew Devold for the Minnesota State Senate and to pro-war Socialist Thomas Van Lear in his bid for reelection as Mayor of Minneapolis, but also to the candidate of the NPL for Governor of Minnesota, Charles A. Lindbergh.

Following the split of the Socialist Party in the summer of 1919 into Socialist and Communist factions, with the latter forming rival organizations known as the Communist Party of America (CPA) and the Communist Labor Party of America (CLP), the Mengshoels remained loyal to the old organization, putting them at odds with the bulk of the Scandinavian Socialist Federation, which along with a number of other language federations of the Socialist Party quit the organization to join the fledgling Communist organizations. By the election of 1922 Folkets Røst had reduced itself to supporting only three Socialist candidates, including Andrew Devold, with the bulk of its support lent instead to the candidates of the Farmer-Labor Party.

This political maneuver, in addition to helping return Andrew Devold to the Minnesota Senate, had the additional benefit of temporarily boosting circulation figures, with the paper managing to briefly match its pre-war press run. This boom would prove to be short-lived however, and Folkets Røst found itself facing termination fewer than three years later.

=== Termination and legacy ===
A combination of factors led to the demise of Folkets Røst in October 1925, including a fragmentation of the market for the radical Norwegian-language press resulting from the Socialist-Communist split, a gradual decline in the number of Norwegian speakers in America, and the declining health of editors Helle and Emil Mengshoel. Helle Menshoel's declining health prevented her from assisting with production of the paper during her final years. She died in 1929.

The newspaper also found itself in dire financial straits, with Emil Mengshoel forced to find outside employment to help support the family. The quality of the paper declined and it was briefly reduced to a bimonthly publication schedule prior to its final termination.

A partial run of Gaa Paa and Folkets Røst is available on microfilm, with the master negative held by the Minnesota Historical Society.
