= Dara Moskowitz Grumdahl =

American wine writer

Dara Moskowitz Grumdahl is an American magazine feature writer and a food and wine writer, based in Minneapolis, Minnesota, United States.

== Personal life ==
Dara Moskowitz was born and raised in New York City and graduated from Stuyvesant High School in 1988; she graduated from Carleton College in Northfield, Minnesota, in 1992. She has been a senior writer for Mpls.St.Paul Magazine since 2012 and lives with her family in Minneapolis.

== Writing ==
The primary outlet for her writing from 1995 to 2008 was in the City Pages, a Minneapolis-St. Paul alternative weekly owned by Village Voice Media. From 2008 to 2012, she wrote restaurant reviews and feature stories for Minnesota Monthly as a senior editor, and she was editor-in-chief of the recipe and food magazine Real Food. From 2012 to 2020, she wrote for Delta Sky Magazine, mainly writing celebrity profiles and travel stories. Since 2012, she has written primarily for Mpls. St. Paul Magazine, focusing on restaurant reviews, profiles, and feature stories. She has also written for Gourmet Magazine, USA Today, Wine & Spirits, Bon Appetit, Food and Wine, and Saveur.

She published Drink This: Wine Made Simple in 2009, and in 2023 the Minnesota Historical Society Press released an anthology of her work, The Essential Dear Dara. Her writing has been included in several editions of Best Food Writing. She has also been included in American Fiction, Volume Nine: The Best Unpublished Short Stories by Emerging Authors, edited by Joyce Carol Oates.

She has been nominated for fifteen James Beard Awards for both her food and wine writing and has won six times, including for the MFK Fisher Distinguished Writing Award for The Cheese Artist. In both 2011 and 2013, she won the City and Regional Magazine Association Award as the nation's best restaurant critic in a city magazine; she has won five CRMAs in total. Her fiction writing has been awarded two Minnesota State Arts Board grants, a fellowship from the Loft McKnight foundation, and the Tamarack Award in 1994.

=== Drink This: Wine Made Simple ===
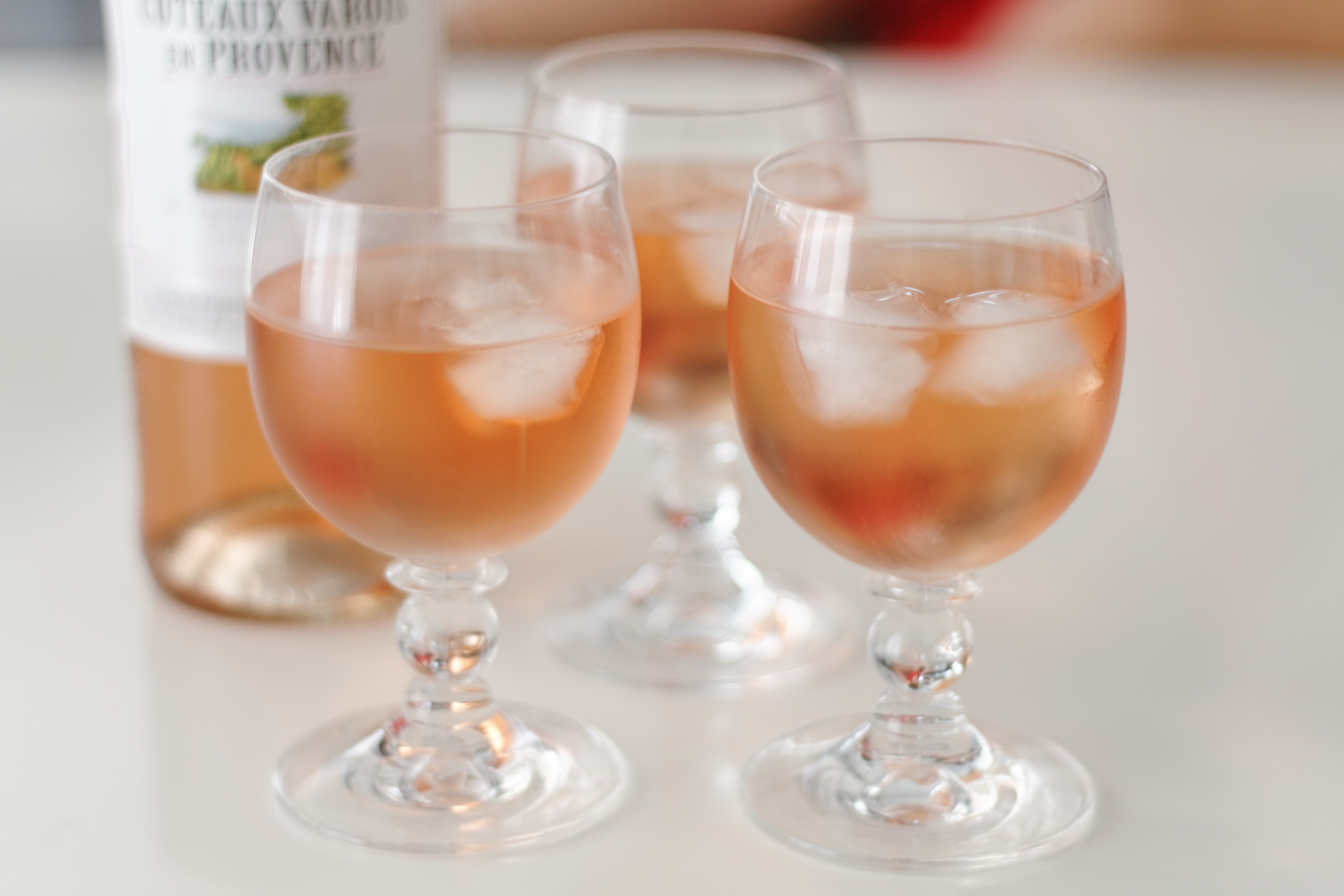
One recommendation that Grumdahl makes in her book Drink This: Wine Made Simple is to put ice cubes in wine.

In her first book on wine, Grumdahl draws on her own experience to aid the reader into better understanding their own tastes and preferences as a guide to exploring the world of wine. The book presents nine parties to have at home to discover the reader's own taste when it comes to nine major varieties of wine including Zinfandel, Sauvignon blanc, Riesling, Chardonnay, Cabernet Sauvignon, Syrah, Sangiovese, Tempranillo, and Pinot noir. The book features some wine history and economics of the industry as well as interviews from such critics, winemakers, and chefs as Robert M. Parker, Jr., Paul Draper, and Thomas Keller. Drink This: Wine Made Simple was released on November 24, 2009, by Ballantine Books (an imprint of Random House).

== Radio ==
In 2012, Grumdahl began the radio program Off the Menu on station WCCO in Minneapolis. Grumdahl also appears weekly on WCCO on the Chad Hartman Show and is an occasional guest on Minnesota Public Radio.
