= Ripsaw (newspaper) =

- Founder: John L. Morrison
- Founded: March 24, 1917
- Ceased publication: 1926
- Relaunched: 1999-2005
- Language: American english
- Headquarters: Duluth
- City: Duluth
- Country: United States
- OCLC number: 1567064
- Website: theripsaw.net

Ripsaw (sometimes called Rip-Saw, RipSaw or The Duluth Rip-Saw) was a Duluth, Minnesota newspaper published from 1917 to 1926 and relaunched from 1999 to 2005. The paper was a scandal sheet during the first years of publication, with a reputation for muckraking, sensationalism and criminal libel. The revival was similar in tone, though the publishers changed.

== The Great Family Journal ==
The original Duluth Ripsaw was founded by John L. Morrison, a fundamentalist Christian who abhorred alcohol, gambling and prostitution. The paper debuted on March 24, 1917. Issues were published every other Saturday, with copies sold at newsstands for five cents. The newspaper's offices were originally in downtown Duluth's Fargusson Building, and later moved to the Phoenix Building.

Morrison produced the Ripsaw almost entirely by himself. Three known helpers were stenographer Alice B. Bartlett, a cartoonist who signed his work "Webster," and Isadore Cohen, a pre-teenaged newsboy who hawked papers in front of the old St. Louis County State Bank. Other writers were also periodically featured, but the vast majority of the work was always done by Morrison, who called himself the "head sawyer" of the "Great Family Journal."

The Ripsaw began shortly after St. Louis County outlawed the sale of alcohol. When Superior, Wisconsin, followed a few months later with its own voter-instituted prohibition, the Twin Ports were nominally dry, but alcohol was available at bootleg outlets and in townships nearby. Local politicians and police did little to enforce the prohibition, and Morrison ridiculed them for it in the Ripsaw. He also editorialized in favor of streetcars, public toilets and higher pay for policemen.

During the Ripsaw's first year, Duluth Chief of Police Robert McKercher and City Auditor "King" Odin Halden were both ousted from their positions after being labeled crooked in the Ripsaw.

Microfilm copies of the Ripsaw are located in the Duluth Public Library and in the Library of the Minnesota Historical Society in St. Paul, for researchers interested in reading specific articles from the paper.

== Morrison's demise ==
The Ripsaw's decline began with the October 25, 1924 issue. Morrison accused State Senator Mike Boylan of threatening him with mayhem and death, Cass County Probate Judge Bert Jamison of having acquired syphilis at a brothel and Victor L. Power, a former mayor of Hibbing, of corrupt legal practices and a weakness for women and whiskey. All three retaliated.

Morrison was arrested by a sheriff from Walker, Minnesota (the county seat of Cass County) on charges of criminal libel brought by Jamison. Morrison was sentenced to 90 days in the Cass County jail, but raised bail and returned to Duluth pending appeal.

While Morrison was held in Cass County, Power instigated criminal and civil libel actions, claiming the October 25 Ripsaw article was written for the sole purpose of injuring him politically. The Duluth police held a warrant for Morrison's arrest pending his release from the Cass County jail. A jury in Hibbing, Minnesota, found him guilty, and he was sentenced to 90 days in the county workhouse. He immediately appealed. Later, Morrison was ordered to make a public apology to Power. The charges against him were dropped and his sentence rescinded. Later that month, Morrison pleaded guilty to the charges of criminal libel brought by Jamison.

The most powerful blow to the "Great Family Journal" came in the summer of 1925. Senator Boylan, who, according to the Oct. 25, 1924 Ripsaw, had threatened to kill Morrison, was trying to have the paper shut down. He worked with Rep. George Lommen to draft several bills allowing suppression of scandalous newspapers. Sen. Freyling Stevens, a powerful lawyer, introduced the senate version of what would become known as the "Minnesota gag law," for which he is credited with authorship.

The Public Nuisance Bill of 1925 was approved by the Minnesota Senate and House of Representatives. It allowed a single judge, without jury, to stop a newspaper or magazine from publishing, forever.

Governor Theodore Christianson signed the Public Nuisance Law, but Morrison was unaware of this change. On April 6, 1926, the Ripsaw attacked Minneapolis Mayor George Emerson Leach: "Minnesotans do not want loose-love governor." In the next issue, Duluth Commissioner of Public Utilities W. Harlow Tischer was the target: "Tischer and his gang fail to establish graft plan."

Morrison was served with a warrant for his arrest based on a complaint from Leach under an obscene-literature ordinance recently rushed through the Minneapolis City Council. The next day, a temporary restraining order was placed on the Ripsaw by State District Judge H. J. Grannis of Duluth. Tischer claimed that the charges of graft were untrue and he demanded that the Ripsaw be stopped. The Finnish Publishing Company, which printed the Ripsaw, was also named in the injunction, and news dealers and newsboys were barred from distributing the paper.

Morrison's trial was set for May 15, 1926. Morrison did not appear in court, as he had fallen ill. On May 18, 1926, Morrison was rushed to St. Francis Hospital in Superior at around 1 a.m. Nine hours later, he was pronounced dead. The cause was reported in the Duluth Herald to be an embolism, a blood clot on the brain. The Herald reported that Morrison "had been ill for 10 days, suffering from pleurisy following an attack of influenza, a general breakdown and attacks of syncope."

Tischer continued to insist the injunction against the Ripsaw be maintained, even after Morrison's death. Judge E. J. Kenney, however, allowed a continuation of the Ripsaw "without the articles objected to by Commissioner Tischer."

On June 1, 1931, the "gag law" was found to be unconstitutional by the U.S. Supreme Court, in what is considered to be the first and most important freedom of the press decision in U.S. history.

== Rebirth ==
The Ripsaw returned in January 1999. Brad Nelson and Cord R. Dada published a monthly scandal sheet similar to Morrison's original Ripsaw. Its first lead story, "Dotygate," accused Duluth Mayor Gary Doty and his administration of various crimes associated with the demolition of buildings on East First Street to make way for construction of the Duluth Technology Village.

The Ripsaw became a weekly publication on April 5, 2000. Paul Lundgren was hired as managing editor and the paper was transformed into an alternative news, arts and entertainment source. One year later, it was accepted into the Association of Alternative Newsweeklies.

While Morrison's original Ripsaw fought for temperance, the new Ripsaw reveled in the exploits of Slim Goodbuzz, who wrote a "Barfly on the Wall" column.

The comic strip "Violet Days," by Chris Monroe, which is now featured in the Minneapolis Star Tribune and Duluth News Tribune, first appeared in the Ripsaw reincarnation.

Co-publisher Cord R. Dada sold the majority of his ownership in the paper to Brad Nelson's brother Tim Nelson in April 2001, relieving himself of all duties at the Ripsaw and leaving Brad Nelson as the majority owner and sole publisher of the paper. Within a few months, Lundgren was dismissed and Nelson became editor/publisher.

The last weekly issue was published on Dec. 31, 2003. Three months later, the Ripsaw returned to monthly status, this time as a full-color magazine edited by Tony Dierckins. It lasted 10 issues before reverting to newsprint for its final three issues, which were published every other month, ending in September 2005.

== Spinoffs ==
Barrett Chase and Scott Lunt founded the website Perfect Duluth Day in 2003. Chase was a cartoonist and copy editor for the Ripsaw, and Lunt helped deliver the paper. Former Ripsaw Managing Editor Paul Lundgren became a part-owner of Perfect Duluth Day in 2009, as did freelance illustrator Brian Barber.

The Ripsaw's former "Web Jërk" and Assistant Art Director Adam Guggemos went on to found Duluth's weekly Transistor in 2004, which featured columns and comic strips by former Ripsaw contributors.

== See also ==
- Defunct newspapers of Minnesota
- List of newspapers in Minnesota
