= List of people from Grand Forks, North Dakota =

The following list includes notable people who were born or have lived in Grand Forks, North Dakota.

== Arts and entertainment ==
- Liz Anderson (1927–2011), country singer; grew up in Grand Forks
- Lynn Anderson (1947–2015), country singer; born in Grand Forks
- Maxwell Anderson, Pulitzer Prize-winning playwright, author, poet, reporter, lyricist
- Robert Anderson (1920–1996), actor
- Tom Brosseau, singer and songwriter, folk guitarist
- Tony Fontane, gospel singer
- Joel Harlow, Academy Award-winning makeup effects artist
- Kam Heskin, actress
- Hillary Kempenich, painter and studio artist
- Ezra Kire, guitarist for Choking Victim and Leftöver Crack
- Nicole Linkletter, winner of the 5th cycle of America's Next Top Model
- Stuart McDonald, former editorial cartoonist, Grand Forks Herald
- Dickie Peterson, founding member of heavy metal rock band Blue Cheer ("Summertime Blues")
- Alan Ritchson, actor, singer, model
- James Rosenquist, artist
- Richard St. Clair, classical composer
- Margaret Strobel, academic
- Corin Tucker, singer songwriter in Sleater-Kinney
- Natalie West, actress, Roseanne

== Business ==
- Greg Brockman, co-founder, chairman, and president of OpenAI
- Thomas D. Campbell, 1928 Time magazine "Man of the Year," and largest U.S. farmer at the time
- Ralph Engelstad, Las Vegas casino owner, philanthropist
- Andrew Freeman, invented the block heater; manager of Minnkota Power Cooperative
- Sally J. Smith, president and CEO of Buffalo Wild Wings

== Law, politics, and government ==
- Rick Clayburgh, North Dakota Tax Commissioner
- Ronald Davies, federal judge, ordered the integration of Little Rock Central High School
- Jerry Gaetz, North Dakota state senator
- Jon Godfread, North Dakota Insurance Commissioner
- James D. Gronna, North Dakota Secretary of State
- Gary Johnson, state congressman for Wisconsin
- Howard A. Knutson, Minnesota state legislator and lawyer
- Walter Maddock, 15th governor of North Dakota
- Leonard Peltier, American Indian activist; convicted of murder in the deaths of two FBI agents
- Dale V. Sandstrom, justice on the North Dakota Supreme Court
- Arthur G. Sorlie, 14th governor of North Dakota

== Literature and journalism ==
- James M. Edie, philosopher
- Marilyn Hagerty, author and writer for the Grand Forks Herald
- Rob Kuznia, Pulitzer Prize-winning journalist
- Al McIntosh, newspaper editor, columns were featured in The War
- Jennie Shortridge, novelist
- Edward Kramer Thompson, editor of Life
- Era Bell Thompson, editor of Ebony
- George H. Walsh, newspaper editor, publisher, founding role with the University of North Dakota
- Walter Wangerin, Jr., author of religious novels and children's books

== Military ==
- Charles W. Lindberg, Marine, part of the first raising the flag on Iwo Jima

== Science ==
- Mancur Olson, economist, social scientist

== Sports ==
- Brooks Bollinger, American football player
- T. J. Frier, American football player
- Andrew Hampsten, champion cyclist
- Virgil Hill, boxer, Olympic silver medalist (1984)
- Ken Hunt, Major League Baseball outfielder
- Tim Johnson, Major League Baseball player and manager
- Tyler Johnson, basketball player with the NBL's Brisbane Bullets
- Jocelyne Lamoureux, women's ice hockey Olympic gold medalist
- Monique Lamoureux, women's ice hockey Olympic gold medalist
- Roger Maris, right fielder with the New York Yankees, hit record-breaking 61 home runs in 1961
- Doug McDermott, basketball player with the NBA's Sacramento Kings
- Lute Olson, NCAA Champion college basketball coach of Arizona Wildcats
- Tim Olson, baseball player with the Colorado Rockies
- Ryan Potulny, assistant coach for the University of Minnesota men's ice hockey
- Cliff Purpur, first North Dakota native to become an NHL player
- Andy Schneider, defenseman with the Adler Mannheim
- Andrew Towne, member of the team that completed the first human-powered transit of the Drake Passage

== See also ==
- List of University of North Dakota people
