= List of people from North Dakota =

State flag of North Dakota

Location of North Dakota in the United States

The following is a list of notable people who were born in the U.S. state of North Dakota, live (or lived) in North Dakota, or for whom North Dakota is (or was) a significant part of their identity.

== A–F ==
Angie Dickinson

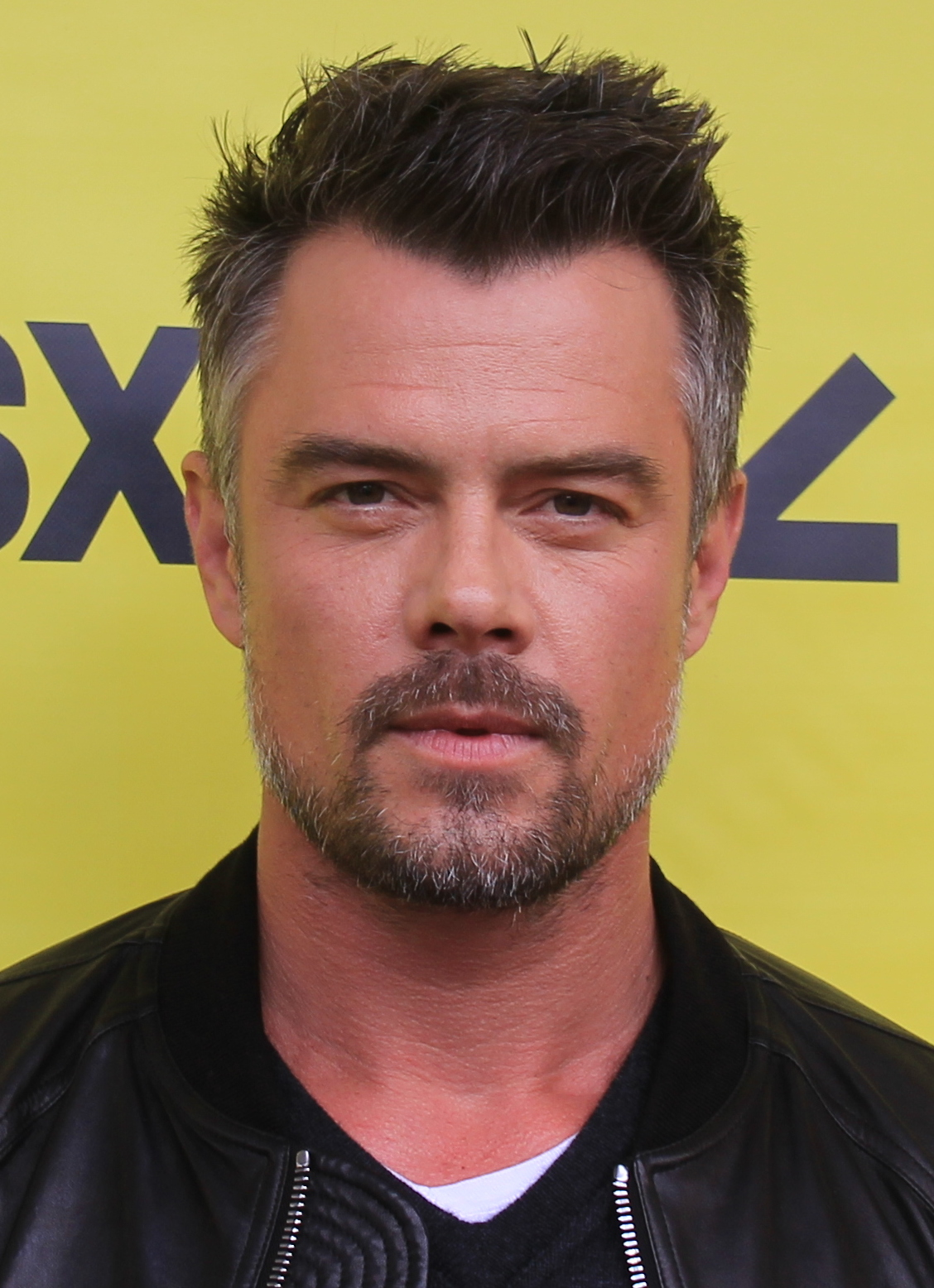
Josh Duhamel

- Fred G. Aandahl (1897–1966) – governor of North Dakota 1945–51; born in Barnes County
- James A. Abrahamson (born 1933) – astronaut, associate director of NASA; born in Williston
- Mark Andrews (1926–2020) – U.S. senator 1981–87; born in Cass County
- Reese Andy (born 1973) – mixed martial artist; born in Minot
- Jennifer Baumgardner (born 1970) – journalist and author; born in Fargo
- Carmen Berg (born 1963) – model and actress, 1987 Playboy Playmate; born in Bismarck
- Leslie Bibb (born 1974) – actress, Talladega Nights, Iron Man, Popular; born in Bismarck
- Elizabeth Bodine (1898–1986) – humanitarian; North Dakota Mother of the Year in 1968
- Brooks Bollinger (born 1979) – NFL quarterback (New York Jets, Minnesota Vikings); born and raised in Grand Forks
- Marcus Borg – theologian
- Jeff Boschee (born 1979) – University of Kansas basketball player (1998–2002); born in Valley City
- Paula Broadwell (born 1972) – bestselling author; extramarital partner of David Petraeus; born in Bismarck
- Greg Brockman (born 1987) – co-founder of OpenAI, the company that released ChatGPT; raised in Thompson, North Dakota, graduated from Red River High School and UND
- Tom Brosseau – singer-songwriter and guitarist; born and raised in Grand Forks
- Dale Brown (born 1935) – college basketball coach; born in Minot
- Virginia Bruce (1910–1982) – singer and actress, Born to Dance, The Great Ziegfeld; raised in Fargo
- Norman Brunsdale (1891–1978) – governor 1951–1957 and U.S. senator; born in Steele County
- James Buchli (born 1945) – astronaut; born in New Rockford
- Quentin Burdick (1908–1992) – U.S. senator; born in Munich
- Doug Burgum (born 1956) – Former North Dakota Governor and Current United States Secretary of the Interior; born in Arthur
- Sam Childers (born 1962) – former gang biker; founder, Angels of East in Sudan; born in Grand Forks
- Warren Christopher (1925–2011) – lawyer, U.S. secretary of state 1993–97; born in Scranton
- Alf Clausen (born 1941) – television and film orchestrater; grew up in Jamestown
- Amanda Clement (1888–1971) – first female professional baseball umpire; born in Hudson
- Kent Conrad (born 1948) – U.S. senator 1992–2013; born in Bismarck
- Chris Coste (born 1973) – Major League Baseball player; born in Fargo
- Ronnie Cramer (1957–2021) – artist and film director; born in Bismarck
- Angie Dickinson (born 1931) – Emmy and Golden Globe award-winning actress, Rio Bravo, Police Woman, Dressed to Kill; born in Kulm
- Byron Dorgan (born 1942) – U.S. senator 1992–2011; born in Dickinson
- Josh Duhamel (born 1972) – actor, Las Vegas, Transformers; born in Minot
- James M. Edie (1927–1998) – philosopher; born in Grand Forks
- Richard Edlund (born 1940) – Academy Award-winning cinematographer, Raiders of the Lost Ark, original Star Wars trilogy; born in Fargo
- Carl Ben Eielson – aviator; born in Hatton
- Anthony W. England (born 1942) – NASA astronaut; raised in West Fargo
- CariDee English (born 1984) – winner, cycle 7 of America's Next Top Model; host, television show Pretty Wicked; born in Fargo
- Ron Erhardt (1931–2012) – college and New England Patriots football coach; born in Mandan
- Darin Erstad (born 1974) – MLB baseball player (Anaheim Angels, Chicago White Sox, Houston Astros); born in Jamestown
- Joe Clifford Faust (born 1957) – author; born in Williston
- Marneen Fields (born 1955) – actress, pop singer, composer, stuntwoman; born in Minot
- Michael Forest (born 1929) – actor, voice actor; born in Harvey
- Hans Andersen Foss – editor; born in Norway; moved to Minot
- Sally Fraser (1932–2019) – actress; born in Williston
- Lynn Frazier (1874–1947) – governor 1913–21 and U.S. senator 1923–41; raised in Grafton
- Phyllis Frelich (1944–2014)– actress; born in Devils Lake

== G–K ==
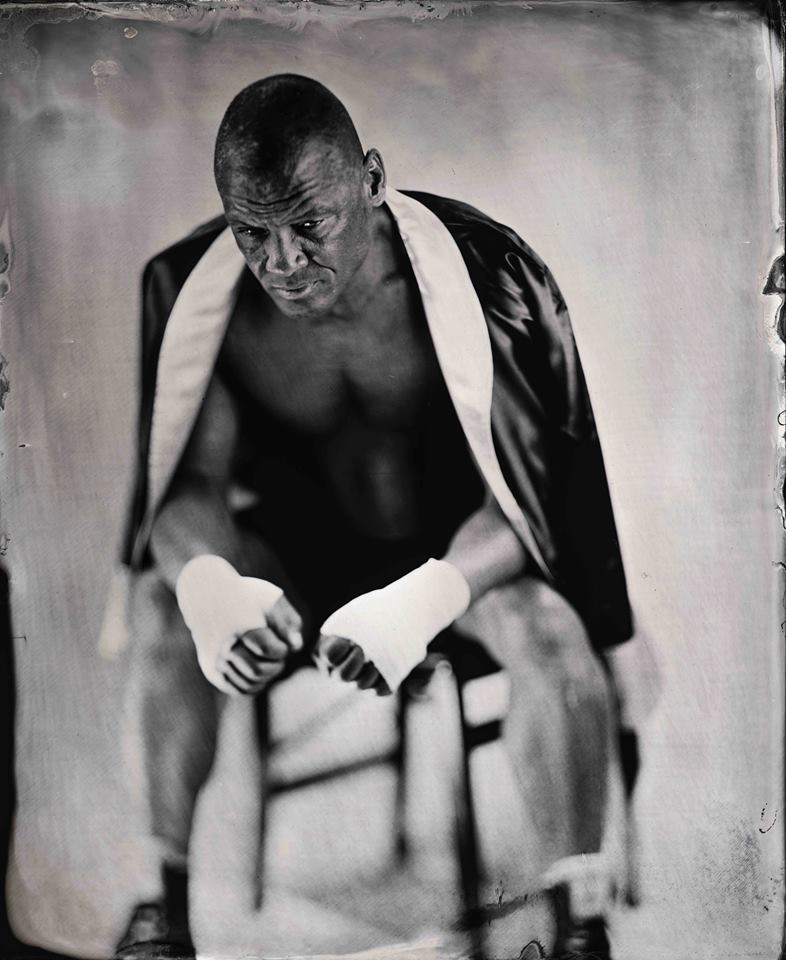
Virgil Hill

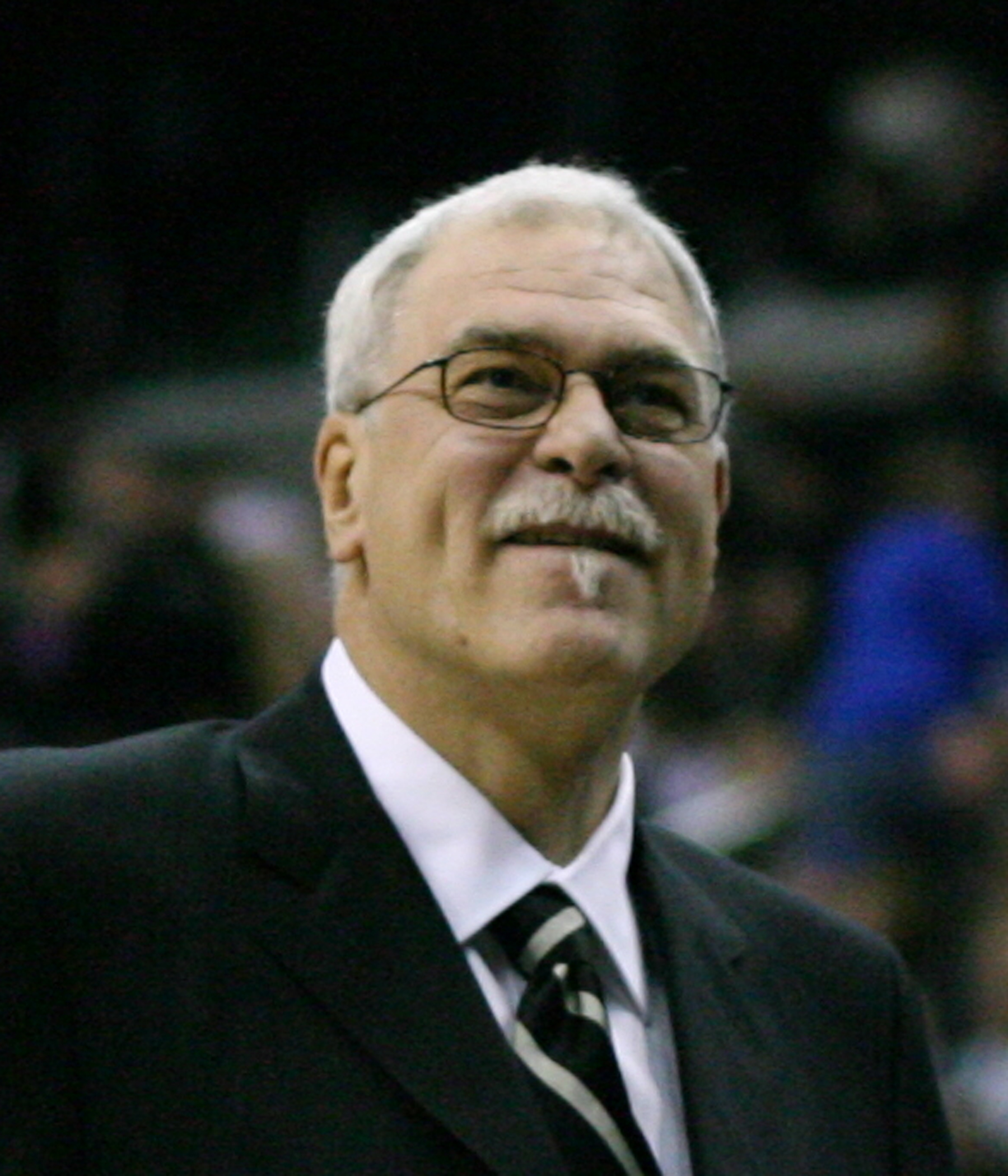
Phil Jackson

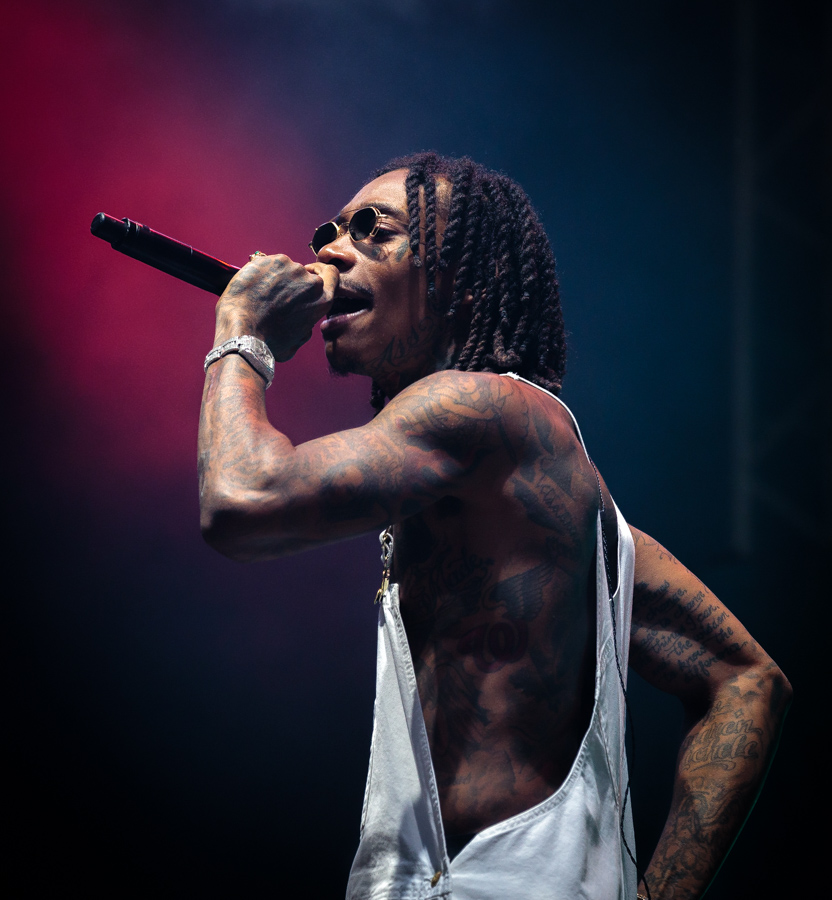
Wiz Khalifa

- William H. Gass (1924–2017) – writer; born in Fargo
- James Getzlaff (born 1970) – reality-TV personality; born in Devils Lake
- H. F. Gierke III (1943–2016) – 71st national commander of the American Legion; chief judge of U.S. Court of Appeals for Armed Forces; born in Williston
- William L. Guy (1919–2013) – governor 1961–73; born in Devils Lake
- Travis Hafner (born 1977) – MLB player (Cleveland Indians, New York Yankees); born in Jamestown
- Gulbrand Hagen (1864–1919) – publisher; lived in Mayville
- Patrick E. Haggerty (1914–1980) – engineer and businessman; co-founder, Texas Instruments; born in Harvey
- Truck Hannah (1889–1982) – MLB player (New York Yankees), Pacific Coast League Hall of Fame; born in Larimore
- Phil Hansen (born 1968) – NFL player (Buffalo Bills); born in Oakes
- Beverly Hanson (1924–2014) – professional golfer; born in Fargo
- Tom Hatten (1926–2019) – film, radio/TV personality, born in Jamestown
- Rick Helling (born 1970) – MLB player (Texas Rangers, Florida Marlins); born in Devils Lake
- Kam Heskin (born 1973) – actress, Sunset Beach, Passions; born in Grand Forks
- Clint Hill (born 1932) – United States Secret Service agent who was in the presidential motorcade during the assassination of John F. Kennedy
- Virgil Hill (born 1964) – WBA champion boxer; from Grand Forks
- Christopher Michael Holley (born 1971) – actor; born in Minot
- Jeremy Horst (born 1985) – MLB player; raised in Des Lacs
- Ken Hunt (1934–1997) – MLB player for New York Yankees, Los Angeles Angels; born in Grand Forks
- Phil Jackson – NBA player; coach, Chicago Bulls and Los Angeles Lakers; president, New York Knicks; attended high school in Williston
- Ben Jacobson (born 1970) – basketball head coach at Northern Iowa; born in Mayville
- Leon O. Jacobson (1911–1992) – scientific researcher
- Robert Jensen (born 1958) – educator; raised in Fargo
- Gary Johnson (born 1953) – governor of New Mexico 1995–2003, presidential candidate; born in Minot
- Harold Keith Johnson (1912–1983) – U.S. Army general; born in Bowesmont
- Tim Johnson (born 1949) – baseball player, scout, manager of Toronto Blue Jays; born in Grand Forks
- David C. Jones (1921–2013) – 9th chairman of the Joint Chiefs of Staff; born in Aberdeen
- Gordon Kahl – tax protester; involved in Medina shootout
- Rich Karlgaard – journalist; born in Bismarck
- Woodrow W. Keeble (1917–1982) – U.S. Army (Wahpeton National Guard) Medal of Honor
- Wiz Khalifa – rapper; born in Minot
- Fred Kirschenmann – leader in the sustainable agriculture movement
- Ev Kjelbertson (1935–2018) – football coach, born in Devils Lake
- Jim Kleinsasser (born 1977) – NFL player (Minnesota Vikings); born in Carrington
- Chuck Klosterman (born 1972) – author; grew up in Wyndmere; attended University of North Dakota
- Dagny Knutson – swimmer; lived in Minot
- Charlie Korsmo (born 1978) – actor, lawyer; born in Fargo
- John Korsmo – politician who served as the chairman of the Federal Housing Finance Board

== L–Q ==
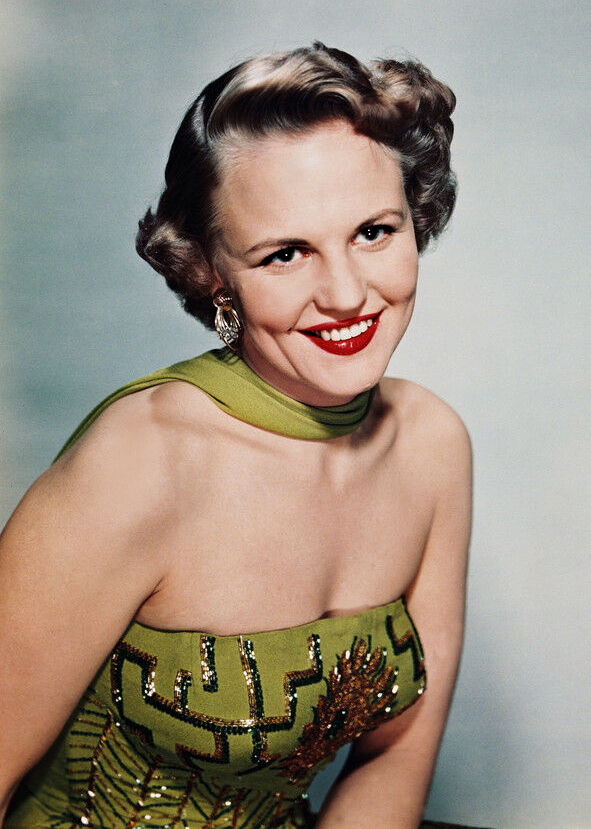
Peggy Lee

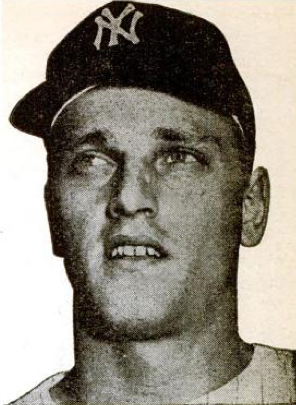
Roger Maris

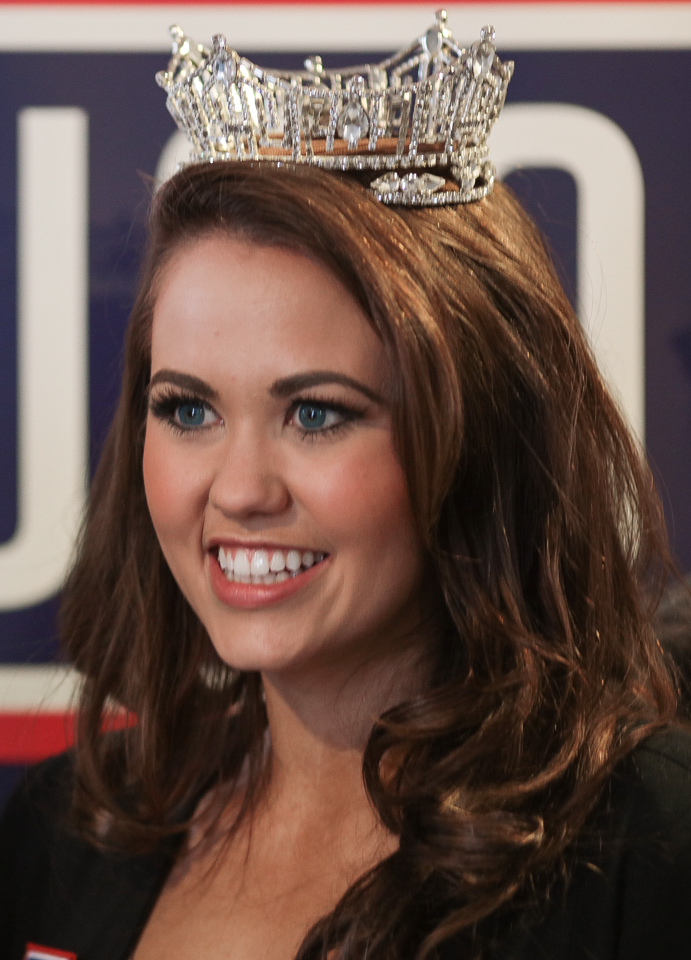
Cara Mund

- Louis L'Amour (1908–1988) – western author; born in Jamestown
- CJ Lotzer – co-creator of CBOYSTV, a YouTube channel with over 1 million subscribers
- Mark Landsberger (born 1955) – professional basketball player; born in Minot
- Jonny Lang (born 1981) – Grammy Award-winning musician; born in Fargo
- William Langer (1886–1959) – U.S. senator and governor of North Dakota; born in Casselton
- Peggy Lee (1920–2002) – three-time Grammy Award-winning singer-songwriter; born in Jamestown
- William Lemke (1878–1950) – state attorney general and U.S. representative; raised in Towner County
- Arthur A. Link (1914–2010) – governor 1973–81; born in Alexander
- Nicole Linkletter (born 1985) – fashion model, winner of America's Next Top Model cycle 5; born in Grand Forks
- Kellan Lutz (born 1985) – actor; born in Dickinson
- Francis D. Lyon – director and Oscar-winning film editor; born in Bowbells
- Tyler Lyson – paleontologist; born and raised in Marmarth
- Walter Maddock (1880–1951) – lieutenant governor and governor; born in Grand Forks
- Roger Maris (1934–1985) – baseball player; broke Babe Ruth home run record; grew up in Fargo
- Jan Maxwell (1956–2018) – actress; born in Fargo
- Kevin Miller (born 1977) – voice actor; born in Minot
- Marquis de Morès – 19th-century land owner; originally from France
- Gladys Morgen - politician who was a member of the Washington House of Representatives from the 5th district.
- Cara Mund (born 1993) – Miss America 2018; born in Bismarck
- Gerhard Brandt Naeseth (1913–1994) – founder of Norwegian-American Genealogical Center and Naeseth Library; born in Valley City
- Grant Nelson (born 2002) – basketball player; born in Devils Lake
- Steve Nelson (born 1951) – pro football player; attended North Dakota State
- Sondre Norheim – pioneer of modern skiing; lived in McHenry County
- John Olerud (born 1968) – baseball player; won two World Series championships with the Toronto Bluejays
- Allen I. Olson (born 1938) – governor 1981–85; born in Rolla
- Amy Olson (born 1992) – professional golfer; born in Oxbow
- Lute Olson (1934–2020) – coach in College Basketball Hall of Fame; born in Mayville
- Carleton Opgaard (1929–2014) – educator; born in Fort Ransom
- Gregory R. Page (born 1952) – executive chairman of Cargill; born in Bottineau
- Ronald Paulson (born 1930) – educator; born in Bottineau
- Ken Paxton (born 1962) – US Senator; born in Minot
- Leonard Peltier (born 1944) – American Indian activist and convicted murderer; born in Grand Forks
- Arthur Peterson Jr. (1912–1996) – actor, Soap; born in Mandan
- Amber Preston – stand-up comedian; born in Fargo
- Adam Quesnell – stand-up comedian; lived in Fargo

== R–Z ==
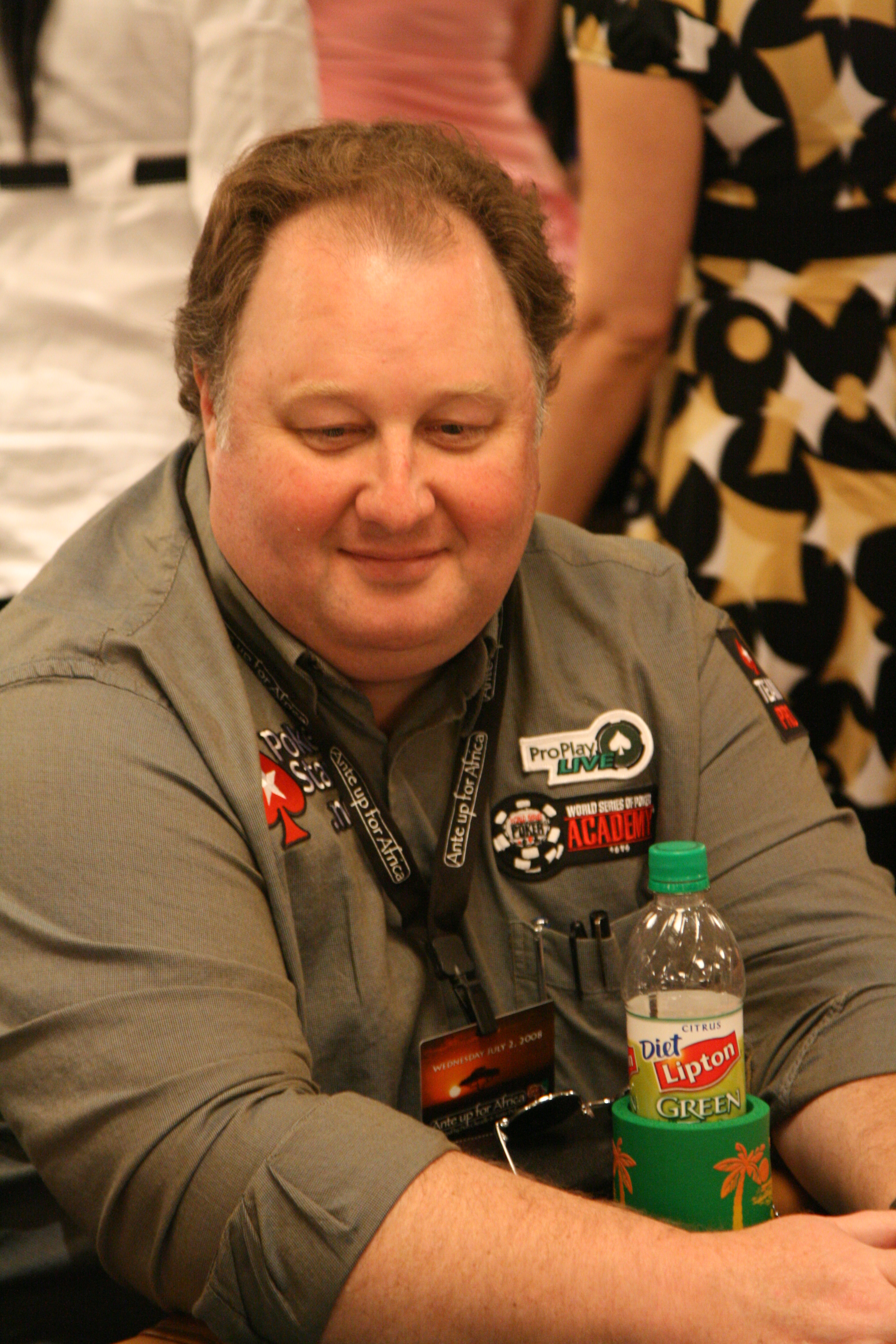
Greg Raymer

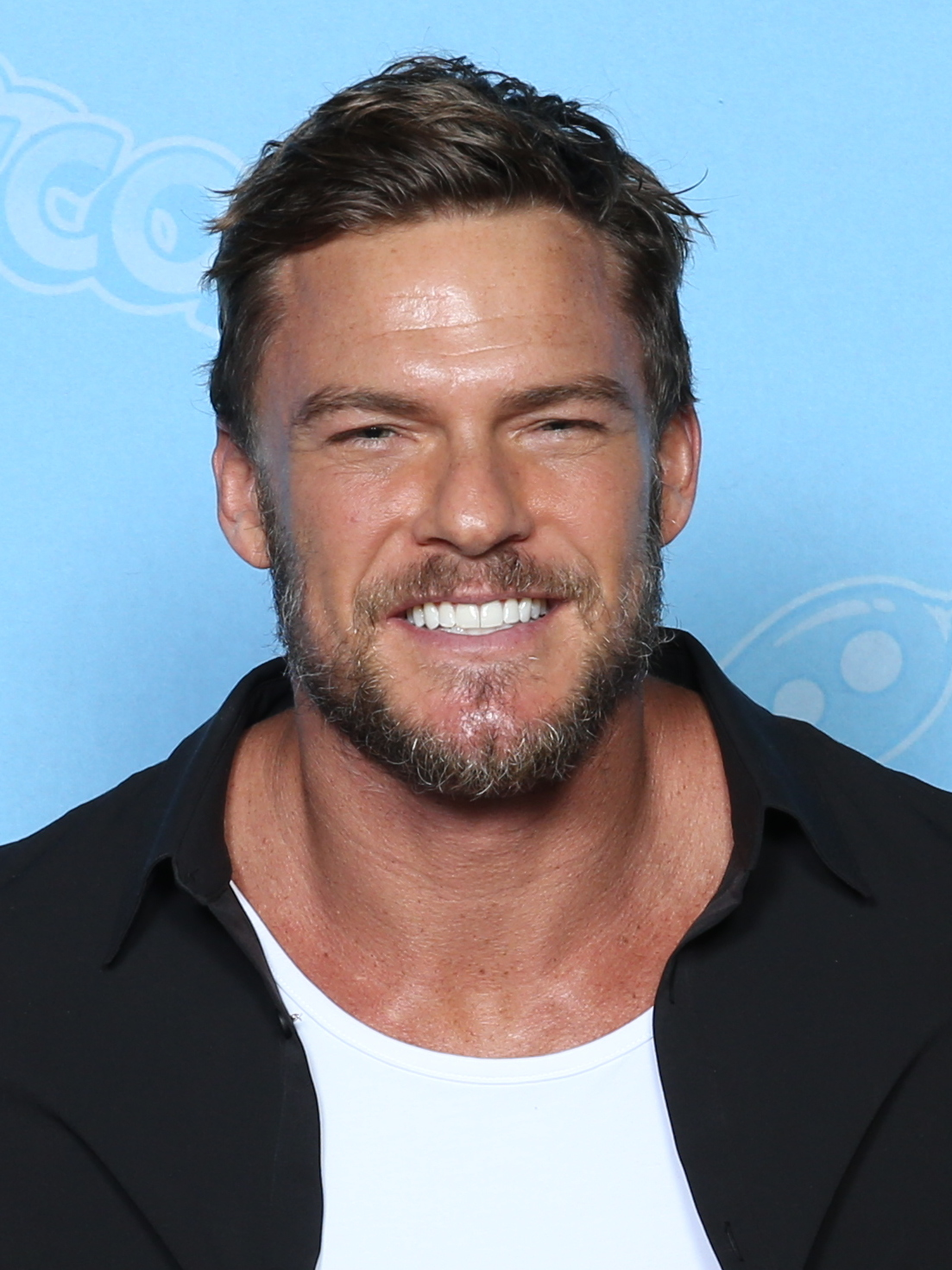
Alan Ritchson

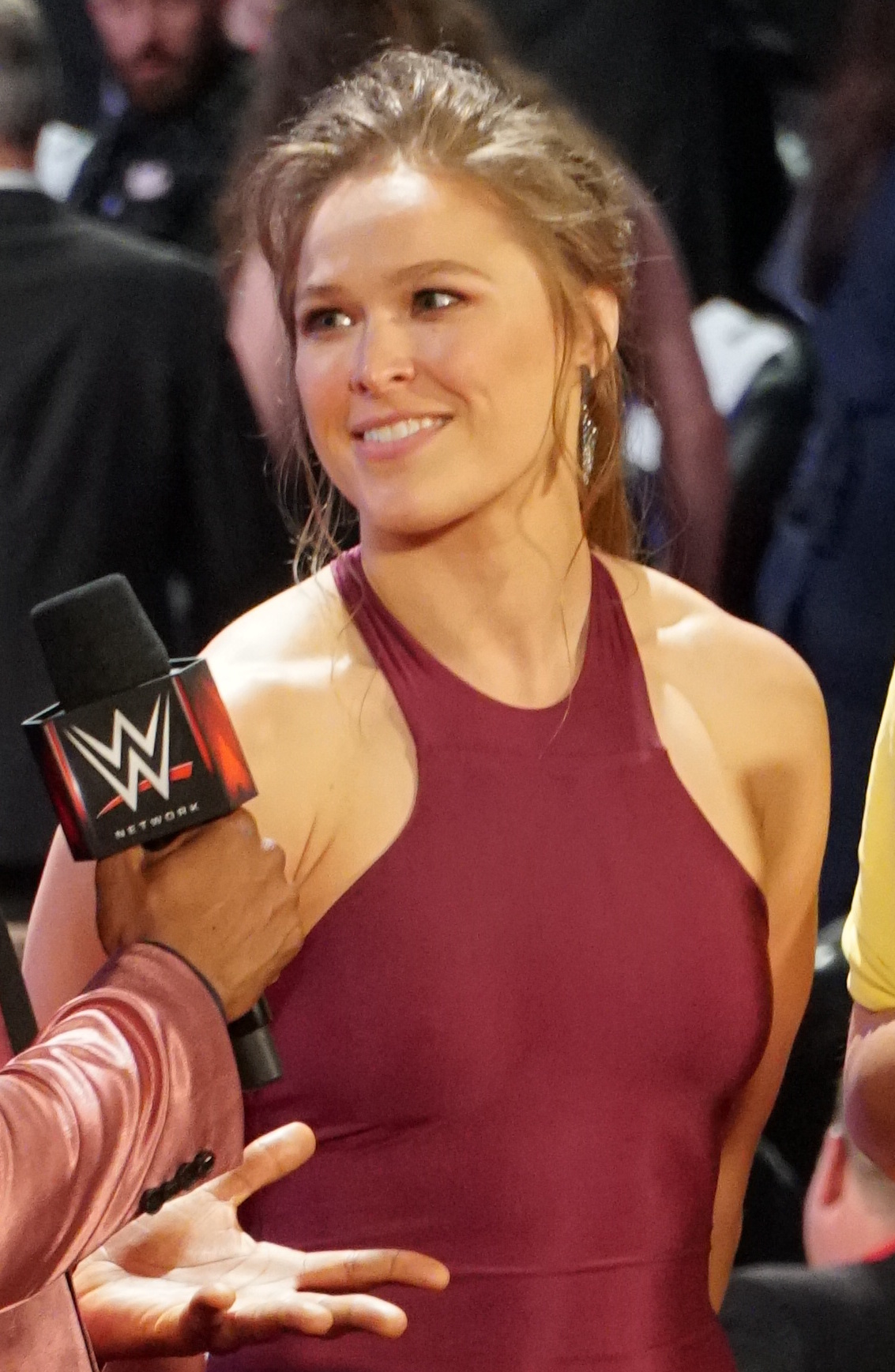
Ronda Rousey

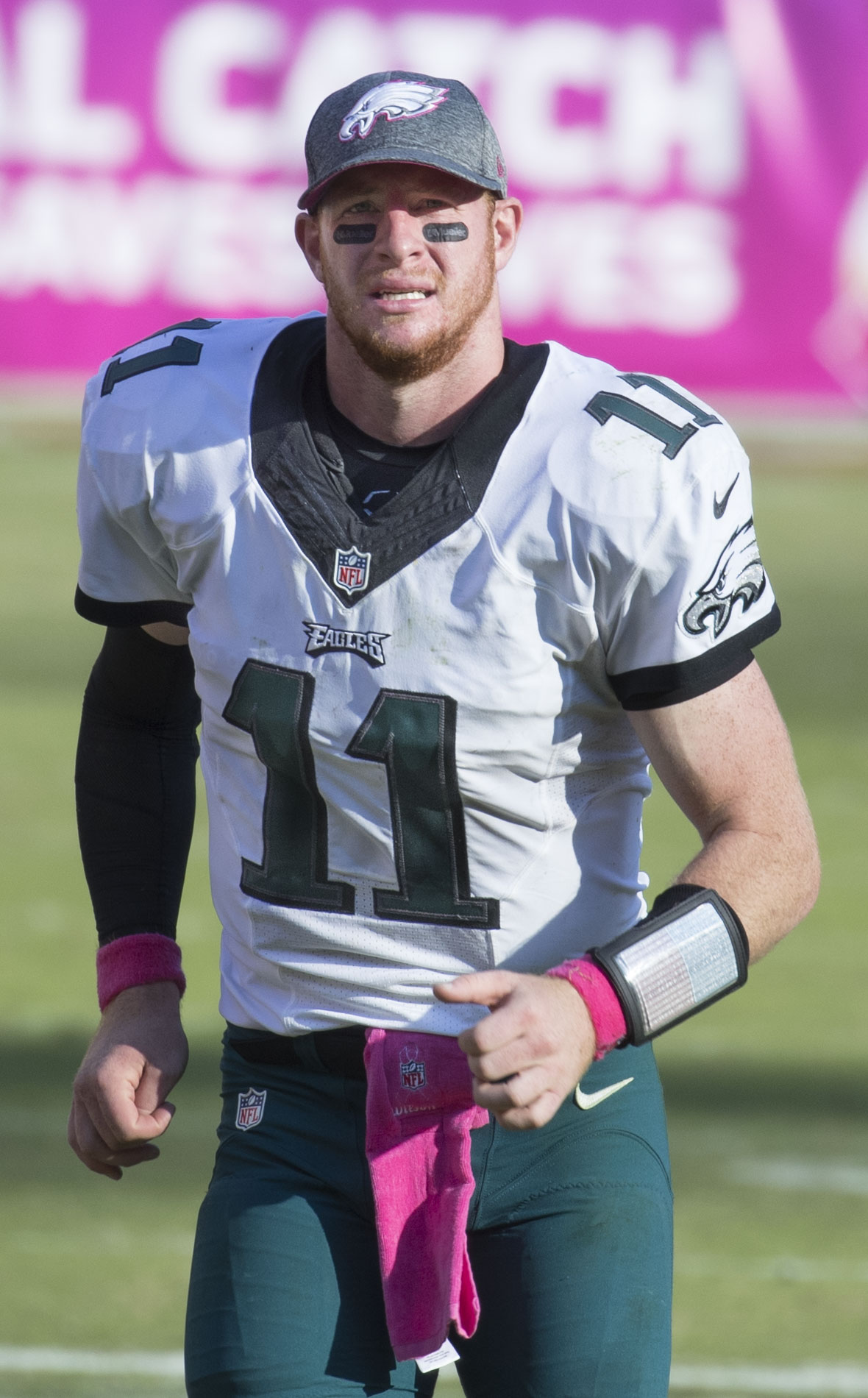
Carson Wentz

- Aagot Raaen (1873–1957) – author and educator; lived near Hatton
- Erik Ramstad (1860–1951) – a founder of Minot
- Tom Rapp (1947–2018) – leader of band Pearls Before Swine; born in Bottineau
- Greg Raymer (born 1964) – poker player; born in Minot
- Clint Ritchie (1938–2009) – actor, One Life to Live; born in Grafton
- Alan Ritchson (born 1984) – model, actor, Blue Mountain State; born in Grand Forks
- James Rosenquist (1933–2017) – artist; born in Grand Forks
- Ronda Rousey (born 1987) – UFC champion; raised in Jamestown
- Sacagawea (1788–1812, or 1884) – guide; key to success of Lewis and Clark Expedition by helping establish ties with Native American tribes
- Ed Schafer (born 1946) – governor of North Dakota and U.S. secretary of agriculture; born in Bismarck
- Harold Schafer (1912–2001) – businessman; born near Stanton
- Donny Schatz (born 1977) – auto racer; World of Outlaws sprint car champion; born in Minot
- Ed Schultz (1954–2018) – TV personality; worked in Fargo
- Kyle Schweigert (born 1962) – football coach, University of North Dakota; born in Zeeland
- Gary Serum (born 1956) – baseball player; born in Fargo
- Eric Sevareid (1912–1992) – TV journalist; born in Velva
- George F. Shafer (1888–1948) – governor 1929–32; born in Mandan
- Timm Sharp (born 1978) – actor; raised in Fargo
- George A. Sinner (1928–2018) – governor 1985–92; born in Fargo
- Arthur G. Sorlie (1874–1928) – governor 1925–28; lived in Grand Forks
- Ann Sothern (1909–2001) – actress in the Maisie films, A Letter to Three Wives, The Ann Sothern Show; born in Valley City
- Richard St. Clair (born 1946) – composer; born in Jamestown
- Rodney Stark (born 1934) – sociologist; born in Jamestown
- Leslie Stefanson (born 1971) – artist, actress; born in Fargo
- Shadoe Stevens (born 1947 as Terry Ingstad) – TV personality; born in Jamestown
- Dorothy Stickney (1896–1998) – actress; born in Dickinson
- Clyfford Still (1904–1980) – painter; born in Grandin
- Matt Strahm (born 1991) – baseball player; born in West Fargo
- Era Bell Thompson (1905–1986) – magazine editor; lived in Driscoll
- Chris Tuchscherer (born 1975) – UFC heavyweight fighter; born in Rugby
- Bobby Vee (1943–2016) – pop singer; born in Fargo
- Harley Venton (born 1952) – actor; attended University of North Dakota
- Mary Wakefield (born 1954) – deputy director, Department of Health and Human Services; from Devils Lake
- Matthew Ward (born 1958) – singer; born in Grand Forks
- Mimi Weddell (1915–2009) – actress; born in Williston
- Sister Thomas Welder (1940–2020) – academic administrator and Benedictine nun; born in Linton, lived in Bismarck
- Walter Welford (1868–1952) – governor 1935–37; raised in Pembina
- Lawrence Welk (1903–1992) – bandleader, entertainer, TV personality; born in Strasburg
- Carson Wentz (born 1992) – quarterback, NDSU and Philadelphia Eagles; born in Bismarck
- Gabby West (born 1985) – actress; attended North Dakota State
- Natalie West (born 1956) – actress; born in Grand Forks
- Frank White (1856–1940) – governor 1901–1905 and U.S. treasury secretary; lived in Valley City
- Larry Woiwode (born 1941) – poet and novelist; born in Carrington
- Milton Young (1897–1983) – U.S. senator 1948–1981; born in Berlin

== See also ==
By educational institution affiliation

- List of North Dakota State Bison head football coaches
- List of presidents of North Dakota State University
- List of University of North Dakota people

By location

- List of people from Fargo, North Dakota
- List of people from Grand Forks, North Dakota

By public office

- List of lieutenant governors of North Dakota
- List of governors of North Dakota
- List of justices of the North Dakota Supreme Court
- List of majority leaders of the North Dakota House of Representatives
- List of speakers of the North Dakota House of Representatives
- List of United States presidential electors from North Dakota
- List of United States representatives from North Dakota
- List of United States senators from North Dakota

Other

- List of North Dakota suffragists
- Lists of Americans
