= List of University of North Dakota people =

This is a list of notable people associated with the University of North Dakota in Grand Forks, North Dakota. This list includes both alumni and faculty members.

== Alumni ==
=== National and international award winners ===
==== Pulitzer Prize winners ====
- Maxwell Anderson – Pulitzer Prize-winning playwright, author, poet, reporter, and lyricist
- Mel Ruder – editor of the Hungry Horse News in Columbia Falls, Montana; 1965 Pulitzer Prize winner in Journalism for spot news covering a 1964 flood in Montana

==== Rhodes scholars ====
- Thomas McGrath – distinguished poet and Rhodes scholar

=== Academia ===
- Twyla Baker (1976–) – academic administrator and president of Nueta Hidatsa Sahnish College
- Cynthia Lindquist – president of Cankdeska Cikana Community College
- Tomi Kay Phillips – academic administrator and president of Sitting Bull College
- Laurel Vermillion – academic administrator and president of Sitting Bull College

=== Arts and entertainment ===
- Sam Anderson – actor
- Srinivas Avasarala – film director and actor
- Acacia Forgot – drag queen
- Nancy Friese – visual artist, educator
- Michael Halstenson – musician and composer
- Nicole Linkletter – winner of reality show America's Next Top Model, fifth season
- Shadoe Stevens – announcer on Hollywood Squares

=== Athletics ===
- Jean-Paul Afif – former ABA player and coach
- Murray Baron – former NHL defenseman
- Ryan Bayda – former player in the NHL Carolina Hurricanes
- Ed Belfour – former NHL goaltender and member of the Hockey Hall of Fame
- Jackson Blake – NHL player with the Carolina Hurricanes
- Jason Blake – former NHL player
- Brock Boeser – current NHL player with the Vancouver Canucks
- Drake Caggiula – current NHL player with the Chicago Blackhawks
- Taylor Chorney – former NHL player
- Dave Christian – member of the 1980 Olympic ice hockey team that beat the USSR in the "Miracle on Ice" game
- Mike Commodore – former NHL player
- Geno Crandall – basketball player with Hapoel Be'er Sheva in the Israeli Basketball Premier League
- Aaron Dell – current NHL player with the San Jose Sharks
- Ryan Duncan – winner of the 2007 Hobey Baker Award
- Derek Forbort – current NHL player with the Los Angeles Kings
- Rhett Gardner – current NHL player with the Dallas Stars
- Pablo Garza – basketball player; professional mixed martial artist; former UFC featherweight
- Matt Greene – former NHL player
- Rocco Grimaldi – current NHL player with the Nashville Predators
- Dave Hakstol – former head coach of the Seattle Kraken
- David Hale – former Phoenix Coyotes player in the NHL
- Quinton Hooker (born 1995) – basketball player in the Israeli Basketball Premier League
- Tony Hrkac – former NHL player and 1987 Hobey Baker Award winner
- Phil Jackson – former NBA player and coach
- Ben Jacobson – head men's basketball coach at the University of Northern Iowa
- Greg Johnson – former player in the NHL
- Luke Johnson – current NHL player with the Chicago Blackhawks
- Ryan Johnson – former player in the NHL
- Milson Jones – former CFL running back
- Tyson Jost – current NHL player with the Colorado Avalanche
- Jim Kleinsasser – former Minnesota Vikings NFL player
- Tyler Kleven – current NHL player with the Ottawa Senators
- Chris Kuper – former Denver Broncos NFL player and current coach
- Paul LaDue – current NHL player with the Los Angeles Kings
- Jocelyne Lamoureux – women's hockey gold medalist at the 2018 Winter Olympics
- Monique Lamoureux – women's hockey gold medalist at the 2018 Winter Olympics
- Jim LeClair – former Cincinnati Bengals NFL player
- Brian Lee – former Ottawa Senators player in the NHL
- Brad Malone – current NHL player with the Edmonton Oilers
- Errol Mann – former Detroit Lions NFL player
- Gene Murphy – North Dakota football player and head coach
- Chad Mustard – former Denver Broncos NFL player
- Brock Nelson – current NHL player for the New York Islanders
- Travis O'Neel – UND football captain of 2001 National Championship Team
- Dave Osborn – former Minnesota Vikings NFL player
- T. J. Oshie – current Washington Capitals player in the NHL
- Zach Parise – former player in the NHL
- Shane Pinto – current NHL player with the Ottawa Senators
- Fritz Pollard Jr. – Olympic bronze medalist in 110 metre hurdles at the 1936 Summer Olympics
- Joe Polo – Olympic gold medalist in curling at the 2018 Winter Olympics
- Tucker Poolman – current NHL player with the Winnipeg Jets
- Pete Retzlaff – former Philadelphia Eagles NFL player
- Nick Schmaltz – current NHL player with the Arizona Coyotes
- Lawrie Skolrood – former CFL player
- Craig Smith – men's basketball coach at Utah State Aggies men's basketball
- Monte Smith – former Denver Broncos NFL player
- Drew Stafford – current New Jersey Devils player in the NHL
- Troy Stecher – current NHL player with the Vancouver Canucks
- Marlon Stewart – former NBA G League player
- Dave Tippett – former NHL player; current head coach of the Arizona Coyotes
- Jonathan Toews – three-time Stanley Cup winner and former captain for the Chicago Blackhawks
- Landon Wilson – former Dallas Stars player in the NHL
- Travis Zajac – former New York Islanders player in the NHL

=== Business ===
- Thomas Barger – geologist and former CEO of Aramco
- Thomas D. Campbell – agriculturalist and corporate farmer
- Mark Chipman – NHL executive, owner of the Winnipeg Jets
- Elmer Ellis – former president of the University of Missouri (1955–63)
- Ralph Engelstad – former Las Vegas casino owner; UND philanthropist
- Dave Fennell – founder of Golden Star Resources
- Andrew Freeman – inventor of the block heater; former manager of Minnkota Power Cooperative
- Eric Hardmeyer – current president and CEO of the Bank of North Dakota
- Hugo Magnuson – founder of Hugo's regional grocery store chain; former Grand Forks mayor
- William C. Marcil – current CEO of Forum Communications
- Peter Nygård – founder and chairman of Nygård International
- Gregory R. Page – current president and CEO of Cargill
- Sally J. Smith – former president and CEO of Buffalo Wild Wings restaurant chain
- Dave St. Peter – president of the Minnesota Twins
- Myron W. Wentz – founder, chairman and former CEO of USANA Health Sciences

=== Law, politics, and government ===
- Fred G. Aandahl – former governor of North Dakota and former U.S. congressman
- Ole Aarsvold – former member of North Dakota House of Representatives
- Dick Armey – former United States House of Representatives majority leader
- Vance Badawey – member of the Canadian House of Commons
- Ken Clouston – member of the Wyoming House of Representatives
- Ronald Davies – former federal judge, ordered the integration of Little Rock Central High School
- John E. Davis – former governor of North Dakota
- Byron Dorgan – former U.S. senator for North Dakota
- Lynn Frazier – former governor of North Dakota and former U.S. senator for North Dakota
- H. F. Gierke III – 71st national commander of the American Legion; chief judge of the U.S. Court of Appeals for the Armed Forces
- Heidi Heitkamp – former U.S. senator for North Dakota
- Thomas Lawrence Higgins – gay rights activist who coined the term "gay pride"; known for "pieing" Anita Bryant
- William Langer – former governor of North Dakota and former U.S. senator for North Dakota
- John Moses – former governor of North Dakota and former U.S. senator for North Dakota
- Ragnvald A. Nestos – former governor of North Dakota
- Allen I. Olson – former governor of North Dakota
- Rosanna M. Peterson – professor at Gonzaga University School of Law and current federal judicial nominee to the United States District Court for the Eastern District of Washington
- Mark Pfeifle – former deputy National Security advisor to President George W. Bush, architect of the Surge strategic communications, and Communications Director for the 2004 Republican National Convention
- Earl Pomeroy – former U.S. representative for North Dakota
- Michael Rustad – scholar on intellectual property; author; professor at Suffolk University Law School
- Brent Sanford – lieutenant governor-elect of North Dakota
- Ed Schafer – former United States Secretary of Agriculture and governor of North Dakota
- George F. Shafer – 17th governor of North Dakota, 1929–1933
- Charles Tighe – lieutenant governor of North Dakota
- Kurt Zellers – current Minnesota state representative and former speaker of the Minnesota House of Representatives

=== Literature and journalism ===
- Maxwell Anderson – Pulitzer Prize-winning playwright, author, poet, reporter, and lyricist
- Chandra K. Clarke – author, columnist, and business woman
- Jon Hassler – novelist
- Chuck Klosterman – author and journalist for Spin and Esquire magazines
- Irv Kupcinet – Chicago Sun-Times columnist; national syndicated talk show host; winner of 15 Emmy Awards and a Peabody Award
- Thomas McGrath – distinguished poet and Rhodes scholar
- Edward W. Moser – linguistics teacher
- Edward K. Thompson – former editor of LIFE magazine
- Era Bell Thompson – former editor of Ebony magazine
- Larry Watson – Milkweed National Fiction Prize-winning author

=== Military ===
- David Charles Jones – former chairman of the Joint Chiefs of Staff and former general in the United States Air Force
- Kevin B. Kuklok – former major general in the United States Marine Corps
- Joane Mathews – brigadier general in the National Guard of the United States
- Homer N. Wallin – former vice admiral in the United States Navy

=== Science ===
- Cora Smith Eaton – physician, suffragist and mountaineer
- Carl Eielson – pioneer aviator
- Judith Kaur – physician and advocate for Native American health equity
- Karen L. Nyberg – NASA astronaut
- Harry Nyquist – important contributor to information theory; recipient of the IEEE Medal of Honor (1960)
- Vilhjalmur Stefansson – Arctic explorer
- Esther Tailfeathers – physician

== Faculty ==
- Robert B. Ammons – founder of Psychological Reports and Perceptual and Motor Skills journals
- Rich Davis – former dean of the UND School of Medicine; founder of KC Masterpiece barbecue sauce
- F. Richard Ferraro – Chester Fritz Distinguished Professor of Psychology
- Michael James Gaffey – planetary scientist
- Robert L. Henry, Jr. – former dean of the UND School of Law
- Meyer Jacobstein – professor of economics; U.S. representative from New York
- Philip Manuel – pianist, organist, harpsichordist
- Peter A. Munch – professor of sociology
- Mary Elizabeth Perley —–French language
- Rodney K. Smith – current president of Southern Virginia University
- Albert H. Taylor – electrical engineer who made important early contributions to the development of radar
- Jack Russell Weinstein – professor of philosophy

== See also ==
- List of presidents of the University of North Dakota
