= Core plug =

Closure for sand casting core holes on water-cooled internal combustion engine blocks

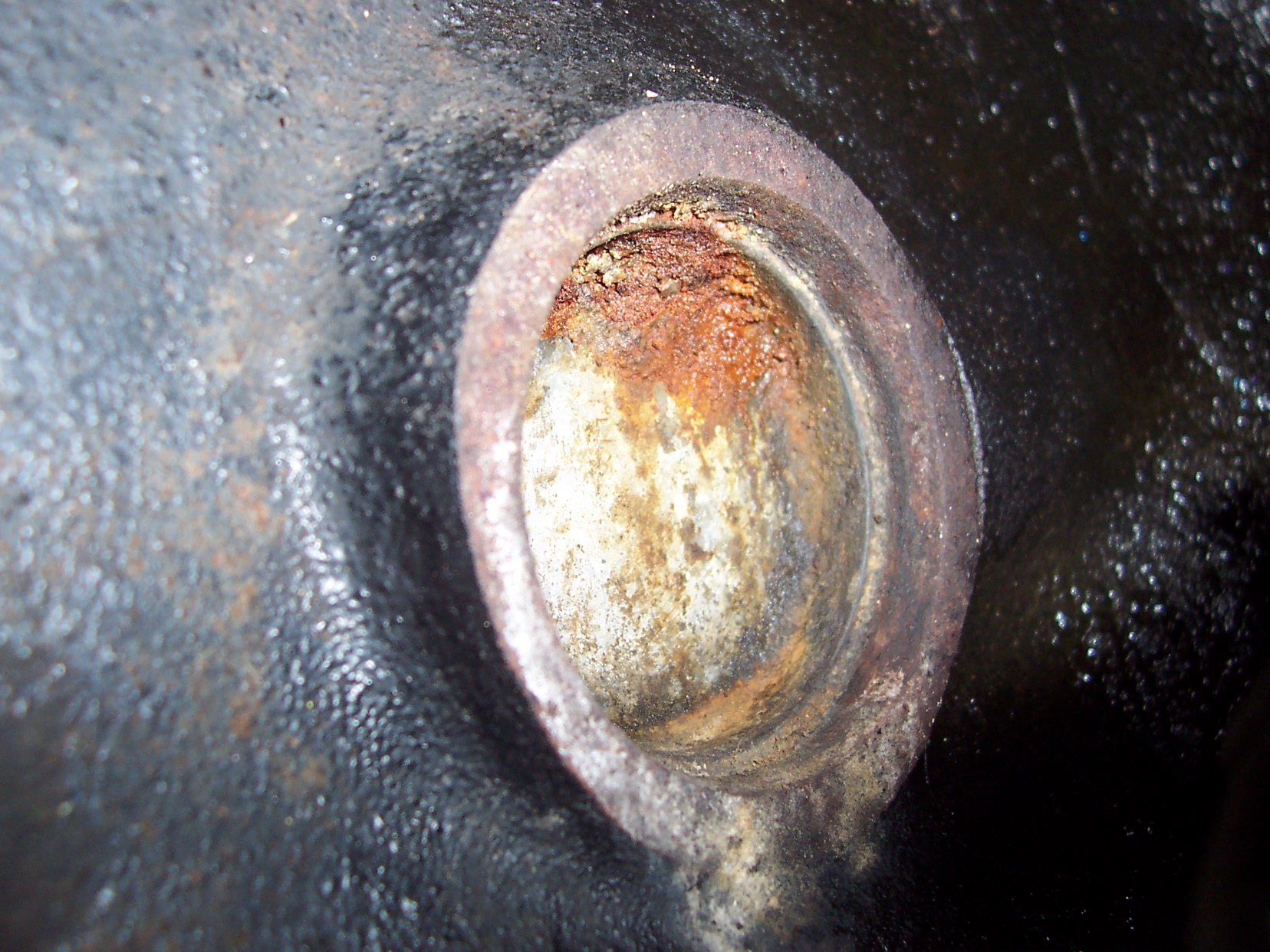
A core plug that has corroded from improper engine coolant maintenance, causing it to leak

Core plugs, welch plugs, or freeze plugs are used to fill the sand casting core holes found on water-cooled internal combustion engines.

== Purpose ==
Sand cores are used to form the internal cavities when the engine block or cylinder head(s) are cast. These cavities are usually the coolant passages. Holes are designed into the casting to support internal sand forms and to facilitate the removal of the sand after the casting has cooled. These holes generally have no factory designed purpose after the sand has been removed although some aftermarket temperature sensors may be installed into the location of a core plug on some engine designs. Another use is to install an aftermarket system designed to act as a block heater which is installed to keep an engine warm due to sub-freezing temperatures as found in far northern climates such as in Scandinavia, Canada, northern Russia, or the state of Alaska. One of the purposes of core plugs is to serve as a cap at the end of these passages used to prevent water or a coolant mixture from leaking out of the engine. Core plugs can also sometimes prevent freeze damage to the motor. During the early stages of the freezing of the engine coolant a freeze plug will sometimes burst or pop out, and thus allow the coolant to exit the engine, before it might expand within the engine during the freezing process and potentially crack the engine block.

== Design ==
Core plugs are usually thin metal cups press fitted into the casting holes, but may be made of rubber or other materials. The most common metal plugs used in automotive engines are made from plated mild steels, stainless steels, brass or bronze. In some high-performance engines the core plugs are large diameter cast metal threaded pipe plugs.

Core plugs can often be a source of leaks due to corrosion caused by cooling system water. Although modern antifreeze chemicals do not evaporate and may be considered "permanent", anti-corrosion additives gradually deplete and must be replenished via a flush and refill. Automotive manufacturers specify time and mileage numbers for cooling system maintenance in their published factory maintenance manuals.

The slang term "freeze plug" was coined many decades ago based on the mistaken belief that the primary purpose of the core plugs was to protect the engine block against freezing. Core plugs were initially designed merely as a necessary engine block component which was made necessary due to the "sand casting" method used to initially form an engine block. After the initial casting of the engine block, core plugs were designed to plug off the "sand exit ports" of the newly formed engine block. Only many years after they were first introduced was it found that they sometimes acted to reduce the possibility of the cracking of the engine block during a freeze.

== Welch plug ==
The Welch plug is a type of core plug that is made from a thin disc of metal. The Welch plug is dome-shaped and inserted into the casting hole with the convex side facing outwards. When installed by striking the Welch plug with a hammer, the dome collapses slightly, expanding it laterally to seal the hole. This differs from other dish-shaped core plug designs, which form a seal when their tapered sides are pressed into the casting hole.

The Welch plug was originally designed in the 1900s at the Welch Motor Car Company in the United States. Prior to the invention of the Welch plug, the core holes were sealed using pipe plugs. During the testing of a car, one of the pipe plugs backed out. In order to get back on the road, one of the Welch brothers installed a press-fit quarter or half dollar coin into the hole using a hammer. The design of the Welch plug was refined based on this principle of a press-fit metallic disc.
