= List of United States presidential electors from North Dakota =

This is a list of U.S. presidential electors from North Dakota, by year.

== 2024 ==
Voted for Donald Trump and JD Vance:

- Rick Becker (R) of Bismarck, former state representative and candidate for Governor in 2016, Senate in 2022, and Congress in 2024
- Kim Koppelman (R) of West Fargo, former state representative and former Speaker of the House
- Jeff Magrum, (R) of Emmons County, state senator

== 2020 ==
Voted for Donald Trump and Mike Pence:

- Sandy J. Boehler (R) of Fargo
- John Trandem (R) of Reiles Acres (at-large elector who replaced state senator Ray Holmberg (R) of Grand Forks)
- Robert Wefeld (R) of Bismarck

== 2016 ==
Voted for Donald Trump and Mike Pence:

- Beverly Clayburgh (R) of Grand Forks
- John M. Olson (R)
- Duane Mutch (R) of Larimore, former state senator

== 2012 ==
Voted for Mitt Romney and Paul Ryan:

- Layton Freborg (R) of Underwood
- Mary Lee (R) of Bismarck
- David Nething (R) of Jamestown

== 2008 ==
Voted for John McCain and Sarah Palin:

- Theresa Tokach (R) of Mandan (at-large elector who replaced Richard Elkin (R) of Bismarck)
- Susan Wefald (R) of Bismarck
- Cleo Thompson (R) of Page

== 2004 ==
Voted for George W. Bush and Dick Cheney:

- Betsy Dalrymple (R) of Casselton, wife of Lieutenant Governor Jack Dalrymple
- Ben Clayburgh (R) of Grand Forks, former candidate for United States Senate
- Jackie Williams (R) of Williston

== 2000 ==
Voted for George W. Bush and Dick Cheney:

- Rosemarie Myrdal (R) of Bismarck, Lieutenant Governor of North Dakota
- Ed Schafer (R) of Bismarck, Governor of North Dakota
- Bryce Streibel (R)

== 1996 ==
Voted for Bob Dole and Jack Kemp:

- Bob Peterson (R) of Bismarck, North Dakota State Auditor
- Earl Strinden (R) of Grand Forks, former candidate for United States Senate and former House Majority Leader
- Vernon E. Wagner (R), North Dakota House of Representatives member from 1963 to 1982, Speaker of the House 1979

== 1992 ==
Voted for George H. W. Bush and Dan Quayle:

- Frank Wenstrom (R), state legislator from District 45 and District 1
- Sheila Schafer (R), wife of Harold Schafer, mother of then newly elected Governor of North Dakota Ed Schafer
- Betty Rinde (R)

== 1988 ==
Voted for George H. W. Bush and Dan Quayle:

- Katherine Kilbourne (Kay) Burgum (R), mother of future governor Doug Burgum
- Harold Schafer (R) who filled the vacancy created by the absence of John E. Davis (R), former Governor of North Dakota
- Brynhild Haugland (R), a veteran North Dakota House of Representatives member, served for 52 years from 1939 to 1990

== 1984 ==
Voted for Ronald Reagan and George H. W. Bush

- Robert McDaniel (R)
- Harold Schafer (R), father of future Governor of North Dakota Ed Schafer
- Joe Steier (R)

== 1980 ==
Voted for Ronald Reagan and George H. W. Bush

- Edna V. Folden (R)
- Robert F. Reimers (R), state legislator from District 23 and District 29
- John E. Von Rueden (R)

== 1976 ==
Voted for Gerald Ford and Bob Dole:

- Norma Pullin (R)
- Oscar Sorlie Jr. (R) North Dakota House of Representatives from 1949 to 1962, North Dakota Senate 1963 to 1972
- Sophus Trom (R) North Dakota House of Representatives from 1959 to 1962

== 1972 ==
Voted for Richard Nixon and Spiro Agnew

- Barbara L. King (R)
- Mrs. Milton (Sybil) Kelly (R)
- Don Hathaway (R)

== 1968 ==
Voted for Richard Nixon and Spiro Agnew:

- A. W. Luick (R)
- Brooks Keogh(R)
- Charles Harris (R)
- Max Wishek (R)

== 1964 ==
Voted for Lyndon B. Johnson and Hubert Humphrey

- Daphna Nygaard of Jamestown (D)
- John Hove of Fargo (D)
- Harold R. Hanson of New England (D)
- Richard Holmes of Guelph (D)

== See also ==
- List of U.S. presidential electors
