= Three Movements for Wind Quintet (St Clair) =

Richard St. Clair's Three Movements for Wind Quintet is a composition for wind quintet that was written between the years 1997 and 2005.

== Structure ==
The work is structured in three movements and takes around 11 minutes to perform:

1. Introduction and Allegro (Molto Moderato - Doppio movimento - Piu mosso)
2. Interlude: Lento
3. Conclusion: Allegro moderato
