= Kevin B. Kuklok =

United States Marine Corps general

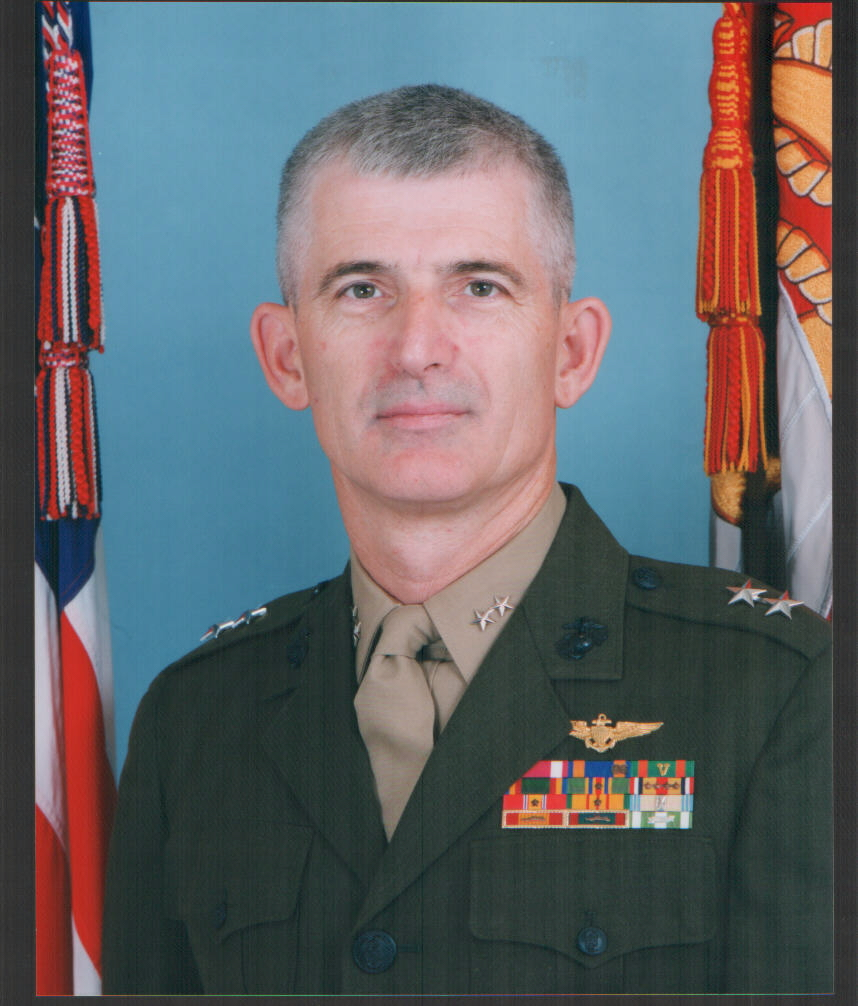
- Military career
- Allegiance: United States of America
- Branch: United States Marine Corps
- Rank: Major General
- Commands: 4th Marine Aircraft Wing
- Conflicts: Vietnam War; Operation Desert Storm
- Awards: Air Medal; Meritorious Service Medal

Kevin B. Kuklok retired from the United States Marine Corps as a major general after over thirty years of service. He attended the University of North Dakota, graduating in June 1968 with a Bachelor of Science degree in chemical engineering. Major General Kuklok received his master's degree in Business Administration from the United States International University in San Diego, California.

General Kuklok enrolled in the Platoon Leaders Class program in March 1965 and was commissioned a second lieutenant in the Reserve of the United States Marine Corps in August 1968. He graduated from Naval Aviation Flight Training in NAS Pensacola, FL earning his Naval Aviator wings in October 1969. He was assigned to UH-1E helicopter transition with HML-267, Camp Pendleton, California. Lieutenant Kuklok served in South Vietnam from March 1970 to March 1971 with HML-367, flying the AH-1G Cobra. He also served as a forward air controller with 2nd Battalion, 7th Marines at Camp Pendleton. He completed his initial active duty with HMA-169 in 1972.

Captain Kuklok joined the 4th Marine Aircraft Wing in 1973 at MAG-46 with HMA-773 at MCAS Santa Ana, CA. In 1976, he transitioned to CH-46 Sea Knight helicopter with HMM-766 at Selfridge Air National Guard Base, Mount Clemens, Michigan, where he served as training officer. His Selected Marine Corps Reserve participation continued with HMM-774, NAS Norfolk, Virginia, working in the S-1 and maintenance department. Returning to MAG-46 in 1978, Major Kuklok served in various billets with HMM-764, H&MS-41, and H&MS-46. He was the commanding officer of H&MS-41, Det B from September 1986 to September 1988 and commanding officer HMM-764 from September 1988 to January 1992. During the latter period, the unit was activated for five months in support of Operations Desert Shield and Desert Storm. General Kuklok's last assignment in MAG-46 was Deputy Commander and Mobilization Coordinator. From there he moved to serve as the director of readiness and safety, 4th Marine Aircraft Wing, MARRESFOR, New Orleans, Louisiana. Upon promotion to brigadier general, he assumed command as the commanding general, Reserve Marine Air Ground Task Force East, (Command Element), Camp Lejeune, North Carolina. He was promoted to major general and served as commanding general, 4th Marine Aircraft Wing from September 1997 until August 2000. He was then reassigned as the commanding general, Marine Corps Reserve Support Command. He served in this capacity until November 2001. He subsequently served as the assistant deputy commandant for plans, policies, and operations, Washington, D.C.

== Awards and decorations ==
Major General Kuklok's decorations include:

Naval Aviator Badge
Meritorious Service Medal	Air Medal w/ Strike/Flight numeral "66"	Navy and Marine Corps Achievement Medal w/ valor device	Navy Unit Commendation
Navy Meritorious Unit Commendation w/ 1 service star	Selected Marine Corps Reserve Medal w/ 4 service stars	National Defense Service Medal w/ 1 service star	Vietnam Service Medal w/ 1 service star
Armed Forces Reserve Medal	Vietnam Gallantry Cross unit citation	Vietnam Civil Actions unit citation	Vietnam Campaign Medal

== Civilian Employment ==
Kevin was the Corporate Ethics and Compliance Officer at EOD Technology, Inc. and a Principal at ethicsgeneral.com
