= Michael Halstenson =

American classical composer

Michael Halstenson is a native to North Dakota. He is a musician and composer. Currently, he resides in Elk River, Minnesota.

== Education ==
Halstenson studied music performance and composition at the University of North Dakota, Webster College, and the University of Minnesota.

== Compositions ==
Halstenson has been commissioned to write numerous pieces; his compositions have been performed in many places. Performances of his music have taken place in Carnegie Hall, Kennedy Center, Lincoln Center, and Tampere Hall, Finland. His pieces have been broadcast on Minnesota Public Radio as well. Halstenson's compositions have been performed by the St. Paul Chamber Orchestra, Minnesota Orchestra, Appleton Symphony, Minnesota All-State Band, University of Minnesota Opera Theater, Lake Wobegon Brass Band, and the St. Olaf Band among others.

== Employment ==
Michael Halstenson took the position of conductor of the North Suburban Concert Band in 1985 and kept the position for 12 years. In 1997, Steve Lyons became the conductor. Halstenson also conducted the North Suburban Chorale, St. Cloud Symphony, Buffalo (MN) Symphony, and directed music at Peace Lutheran Church in Coon Rapids, Minnesota. Halstenson retired in 2017, but makes frequent appearances at Anoka High School. During his employment, he directed the orchestra program at Anoka High School and was in charge of the music for the Anoka High School theater program. He began his work at Anoka High School in 1996. He also conducts the Northern Symphony Orchestra and the Lake Wobegon Brass Band.
