= Hillary Kempenich =

Hillary Kempenich is a painter and studio artist, as well as a member of the Turtle Mountain band of Chippewa.

== Background and education ==
Kempenich lives in Grand Forks, North Dakota, and has worked as an artist at the Grand Forks Public Schools, where she aided in an exploration of the arts of children grades one to five. Kempenich has been featured in multiple galleries as well as travelling exhibitions. These include Art of The Resistance hosted by the Honor the Earth Organization, Bring Her Home produced by the All My Relations Gallery located in Minneapolis,"Indanishinaabekwew" (I am an Anishinaabe Woman) at Watermark Art Center's Miikanan Gallery in Bemidji and exhibitions with The Sioux Indian Museum in Rapid City, South Dakota.

Her work oscillates between keeping cultural traditions and exploring fresh mediums and artistic innovation. She began her artistic pursuits at four years of age, and much of her learning was self-guided. She eventually went on to pursue a Bachelor of Arts in visual arts at the University of North Dakota.

== Major works and cooperations ==
Kempenich's major cooperations include the book Storytelling Time: Native North American Art, which was named one of IPPY's Outstanding Books of the Year in 2011. The book features one of her artworks titled "Strengthening the Circle of Life", painted with oil on canvas in 2006. Other significant works include "Nookimisjichaag Odishiwed" (Grandmother Visits the People), 4'x5' oil on canvas, and "Time to Pause and Reflect", 48"x60" and acrylic on canvas.

== Awards ==
Kempenich has received awards from the National Indian Child Welfare Association, Native Arts Gathering, and the First People's Fund. In 2016 she received the First People's Fund Artist and Business Grant and Fellowship Award.
