= Pipe plug =

Tool for temporarily sealing pipes

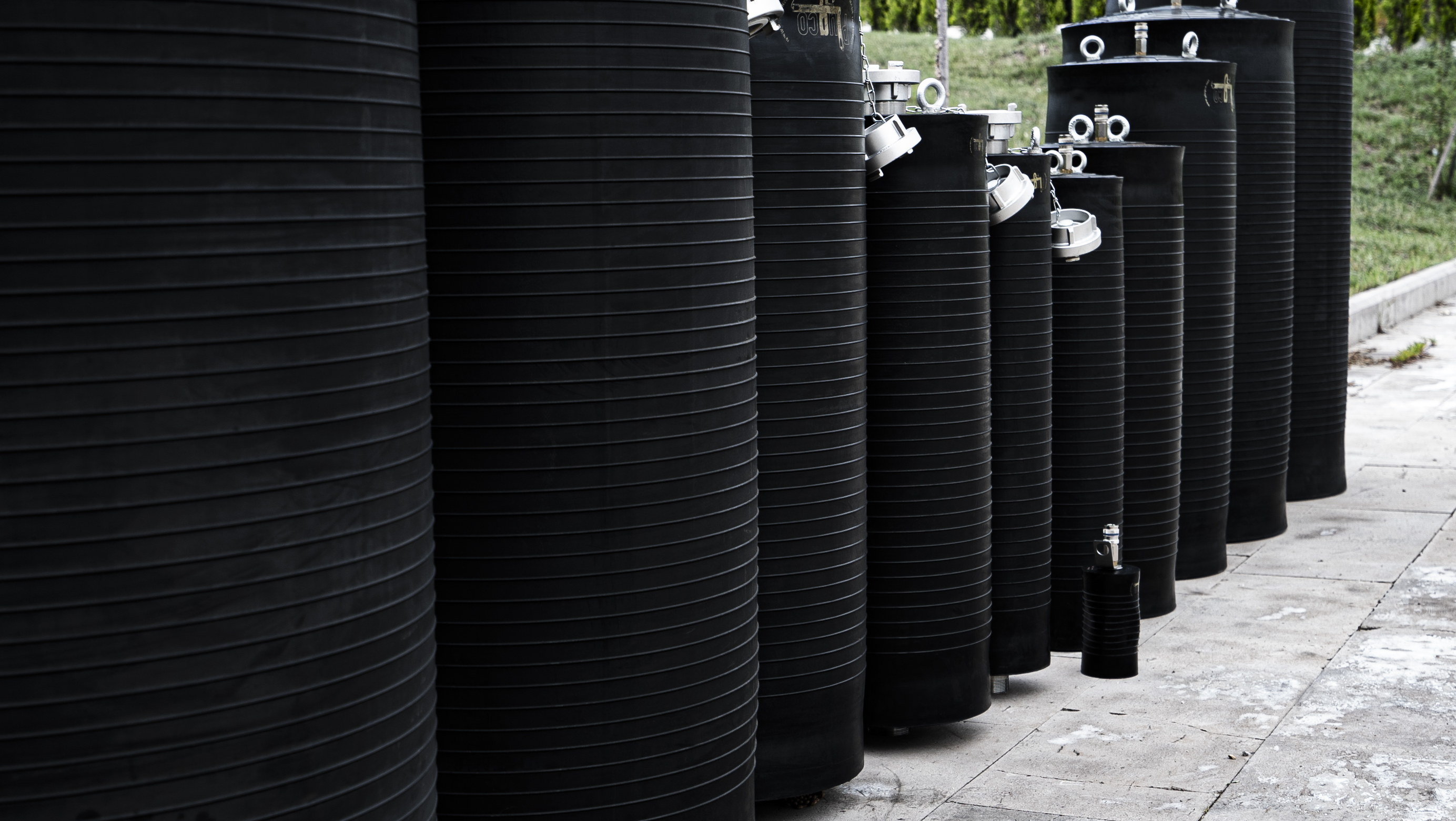
Pipe plugs

A pipe plug is a tool or material for the temporary sealing of pipelines in sewerage and other liquid and gas transportation systems; typically for maintenance or non-pressurized line testing. A pipe plug is also known as an inflatable plug, mechanical pipe plug, pipe test plug, pipeline isolation plug, expandable plug, pipe bung, pipe stopper, pipe packer, pneumatic pipe plug or pipe balloon depending on the region where it is used.

== History ==
The origin is debated, but the earliest patents related with plugging the pipes date back to the 1890s. The first patent for a pipe plug as we know today is by Oscar F. Anderson, published in 1952., and the first patent for inflatable plugs was published in 1965

== Usage ==
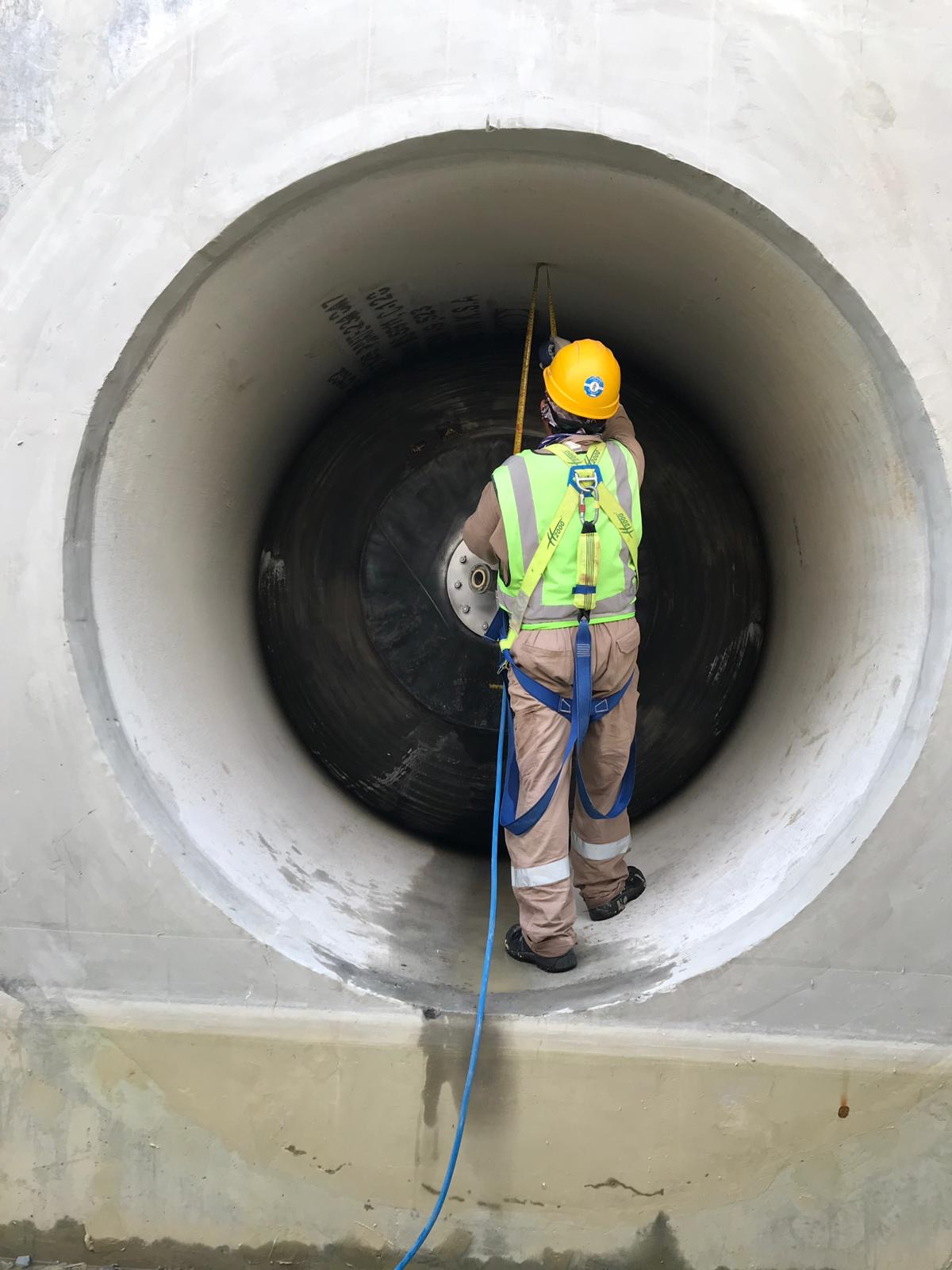
Operators on process

Pipe plugs are often confused with relatively smaller plumbing accessories. However, as an industrial tool, pipe plugs are used in larger infrastructure pipelines. Pipe plugs provide a trench-less method for the maintenance of drains and sewers, and construction and testing of non-pressurized gravity pipelines.

There are three main purposes of pipe plugs. These are temporary sealing or stopping the fluid flow in a pipeline, leak testing and by-passing the flow. They are also used for blocking the ends of pipes to prevent the entry of dirt and other contaminants during construction, maintenance or repair of pipelines.

The leak tests of gravity pipelines using the pipe plug are performed with respecting the requirements of the European Standard EN1610 for both water and air tests.

The inflatable pipe plugs have a wide variety of types each for different purpose:

- Pipe plug
- Pipe test plug
- Conical plug
- Pipe packer
- High pressure pipe plug
- Oil and gas pipe plug
- Steam process plug
- Pipe joint tester

== Back pressure ==
Back pressure is a major issue for the users of pipe plugs on site. It refers to the force that a pipe plug holds during the process. Pipe plugs are usually subject to huge amount of back pressure that occurs in the pipeline, so the back pressure must be calculated accurately in order to prevent the pipe plug to slip inside the pipe. Slipping of the pipe plug may cause in hazardous results. Though Mechanical and Inflatable Pipe Plugs can rely upon the seals for restraint, typically, secondary mechanical restraint is required to prevent slippage – in the form of friction screw dogs that engage to the pipe, by utilizing strong back supports, anchors, or other user added blocking methods.

=== Formula of back pressure calculation ===
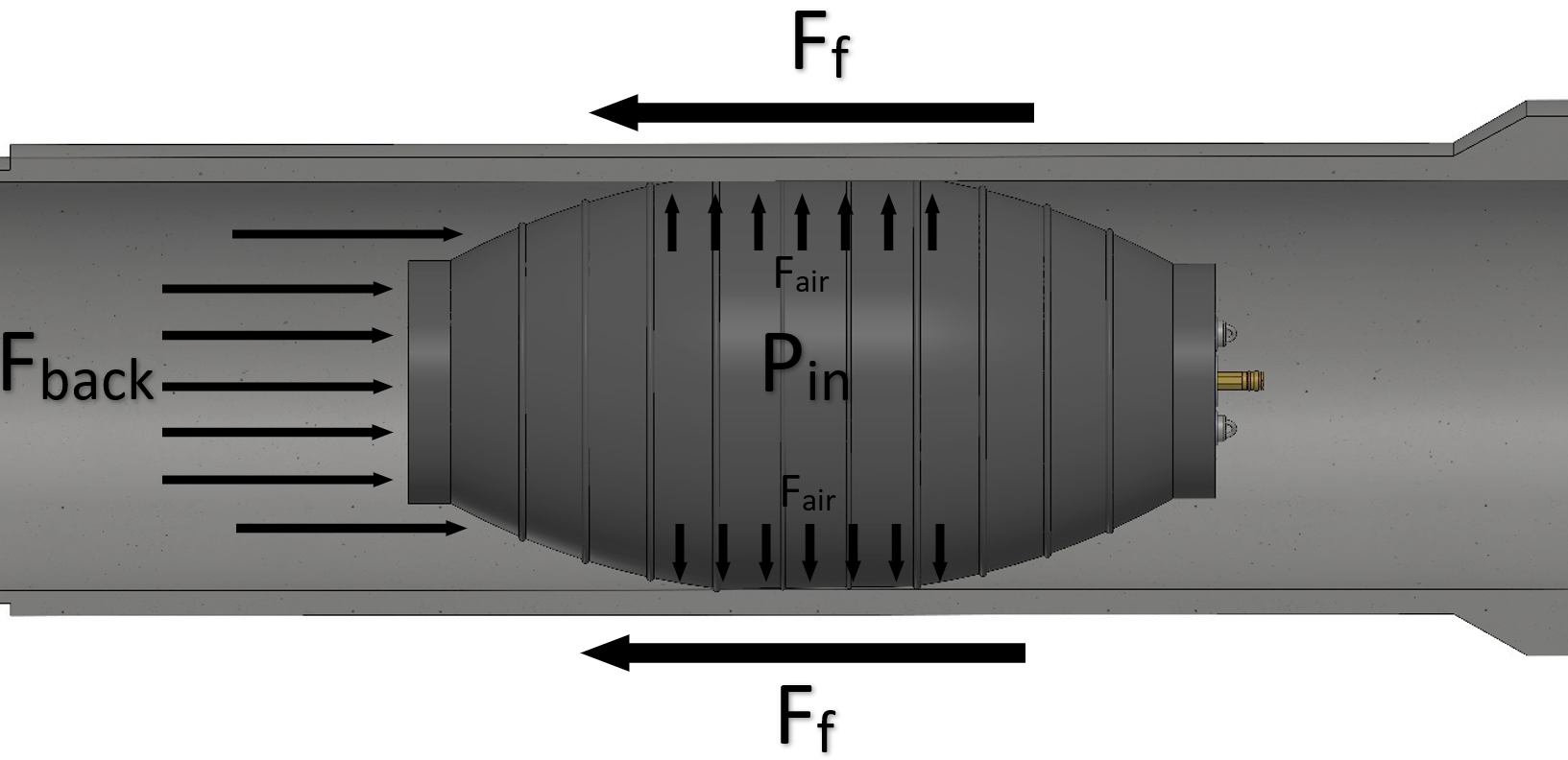
Back pressure calculation

F_{back} = Surface x back pressure

$F_b = \pi.r^2 . P_b$

$F_f = (\mu . P_i . 2\pi.r . L_c) + (\mu . W_w)$

$F_b = F_f$

$P_b = \frac{\mu. P_i . L_c}r + \frac{W_w.\mu}{2\pi.r^2}$

$F_b$: Back pressure force

Surface: $\pi.r^2$

$r$: Radius of the pipe

$\mu$: Friction coefficient

$F_f$: Friction force

$P_b$: Back pressure

$P_i$: Inflation pressure

$L_c$: Contact length

$W_w$: Weight of the plug

== Accessories ==
Pipe plugs are used with supplementary accessories such as air and water hoses, air and pressure control devices, gauges, adapters and chains depending on the type of the pipe plug and the process.

Auxiliary equipment like compressors for inflating the pipe plugs, water tanks for filling the pipeline and pumps for some cases must be used.

== Maintenance ==
For a longer life cycle, pipe plugs should be cleaned with soap and water before and after each use. Chemical solvents, hydrocarbons, petroleum fluids or other aggressive substances shouldn't be used while cleaning, since they may damage or destroy the rubber of the pipe plug. After cleaning, pipe plugs should be flushed with clean water and left to dry at room temperature before using in the pipelines.

Storing conditions are determined by the ISO 2230 standard. Pipe plugs are to be stored in a dry space at 15-25 °C away from direct sun light and circulating air. Long term contact with liquids, metals and other rubber materials should be avoided.
