= Grand Forks Herald =

Newspaper in Grand Forks, North Dakota

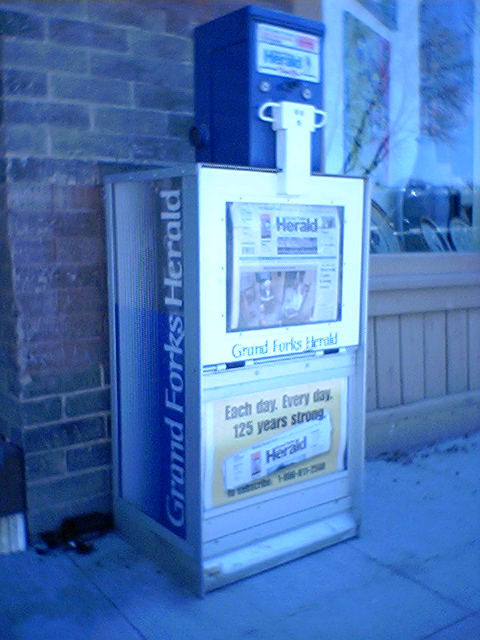
- Type: Daily newspaper
- Format: Broadsheet
- Owner: Forum Communications
- Founder: George B. Winship
- Publisher: Korrie Wenzel
- Founded: 1879
- Language: English
- Headquarters: 3535 S 31st St, Ste 205; Grand Forks, ND 58201
- City: Grand Forks, North Dakota
- Country: United States
- Circulation: 14,047 (as of 2024)
- ISSN: 0745-9661
- OCLC number: 1751382
- Website: grandforksherald.com

- Grand Forks Herald
- U.S. National Register of Historic Places
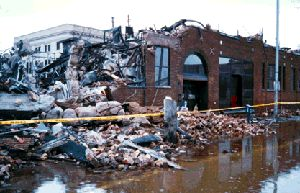
- The remains of the former Herald building after it was destroyed by fire and floodwater

- Location within North Dakota Location within the United States
- Location: 120-124 N. 4th St., Grand Forks, North Dakota
- Coordinates: 47°55′33″N 97°1′58″W
- Area: less than one acre
- Built: 1939, 1949, 1959
- Architect: Wells, Theo. B.; Groz & Anderson
- Architectural style: Moderne
- MPS: Downtown Grand Forks MRA
- NRHP reference No.: 82001326
- Added to NRHP: November 30, 1982

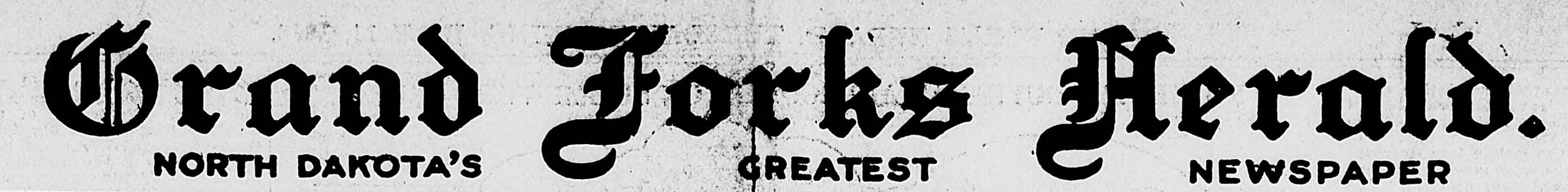
Nameplate of Grand Forks Herald on July 11, 1916

The Grand Forks Herald is a daily broadsheet newspaper, established in 1879, published in Grand Forks, North Dakota, United States. It is the primary daily paper for northeast North Dakota and northwest Minnesota.

== History ==
On June 26, 1879, George B. Winship published the first edition of the weekly Grand Forks Herald. On November 1, 1881, the paper expanded into a daily. In August 1911, Winship sold the business to a syndicate organized by J.D. Bacon. At that time the Herald absorbed a rival paper called the Evening Times.

In June 1929, Melvin M. Oppegard and the Ridder brothers acquired the Herald. The Ridder family continued to operate the paper for decades. In 1933, Winship became one of the first two inductees in the North Dakota Newspaper Hall of Fame. In August 1969, Oppegard died after publishing the paper for four decades, and in April 1972 was inducted into the hall of fame.

In July 1974, Ridder Publications merged with Knight Newspapers to form Knight Ridder. In April 1997, the paper's office was destroyed in a fire that occurred during a historic flood. In April 1998, the Herald won a Pulitzer Prize for Public Service for its coverage of the Red River Flood.

In March 2006, The McClatchy Company acquired Knight Ridder, and then sold the Herald and Duluth News Tribune to Forum Communications. In April 2020, the paper switched from carrier to postal delivery and reduced it's printed schedule to two days a week: Tuesdays and Saturdays.

== Grand Forks Herald Building ==
The Grand Forks Herald's historic building was listed on the National Register of Historic Places in 1982. It is a two-story Art Moderne brick commercial building built in three parts, in 1939 (designed by Theodore B. Wells), 1949 and 1959.

== Notable staff ==
- Stuart McDonald (Editorial cartoonist, 1961–1967)
- Robert Ridder (Reporter)
- Marilyn Hagerty (Columnist)
