= Robert L. Henry Jr. =

American legal academic (1882-?)

Robert L. Henry Jr. (born 1882, date of death unknown) was an American professor of law.

== Biography ==
Born in Chicago, Illinois he was educated at the University of Chicago and as Rhodes Scholar in Oxford. He was also educated at Heidelberg, Germany, and Grenoble, France.

He held the position of professor of law at several State universities, also holding the position of dean of the College of Law at the University of North Dakota from 1912 to 1914.

He was a judge of mixed court in Alexandria, Egypt, according to photo evidence.

He was commissioned captain of infantry in the Officers Reserve Corps in 1916, and promoted to major in 1919. He was instructor in several officers' training camps from 1917 to 1919, and was a member of the War Department Board of Contract Adjustment in Washington during 1919–20. He lectured at Oxford, England, during 1920–22.

== Writings ==
- Liens and Pledges (1913)
- Consideration in Contracts 601 A. D. to 1520 A. D. (1917)
- Anglo-Saxon Contracts (1917)
