= North Dakota Democratic Party =

- Founded: 1889
- Dissolved: 1956
- Merged into: North Dakota Democratic NPL Party
- Ideology: Liberalism
- Political position: Center
- National affiliation: Democratic Party
- Colors: Blue

The North Dakota Democratic Party was a political party in North Dakota that existed from the state's formation in 1889 until 1956, when the party merged with the Nonpartisan League to form the modern North Dakota Democratic NPL Party.

For most of its history until its merger with the NPL, the Democratic Party was a distant competitor for votes; between the founding of the state and 1956, just 3 out of 24 governors: John Burke (1907–1913), Thomas H. Moodie (1935), and John Moses (1937–1945) were Democrats.

The public policy victories that made the NPL successful (a state bank and state-owned grain facilities) and its union with the Democratic Party "meant the death of the NPL as a separate force in South Dakota politics."

== See also ==
- Politics of North Dakota
- Political party strength in North Dakota
