= Stuart McDonald (cartoonist) =

American artist and politician (1931–2021)

Stuart J. McDonald (March 15, 1931 – October 2, 2021) was an American cartoonist and politician. He was the editorial cartoonist for the Sunday edition of the Grand Forks Herald from 1961 to 1967. His cartoons also appeared in the North Dakotan, a publication of the Greater North Dakota Association, from 1965 to 1968.

== Life and career ==
Stuart J. McDonald was born in Grand Forks, North Dakota on March 15, 1931. He graduated from Grand Forks Central High School in 1949. He attended the University of North Dakota for two years, before entering the United States Air Force in 1951. Following his return, he became vice-president of the McDonald Clothing Company, located in Grand Forks.

The only regularly published editorial cartoonist in the Dakotas, McDonald's cartoons explored a myriad of local, state, national and international issues. He won three George Washington Honor Medals from the Freedoms Foundation at Valley Forge. He also served two terms as a Republican in the North Dakota House of Representatives.

McDonald also spent time in Denver, Colorado, and Jamestown, North Dakota, before retiring in 2001.

McDonald later lived in Newburgh, Indiana where he drew the political cartoons for the Evansville Courier & Press. He died on October 2, 2021, at the age of 90.

== Bibliography ==
- Dodds, David. Former Herald cartoonist donates his collection to UND. Grand Forks Herald. July 8, 2004.
- The McDonald Book: A Collection of Editorial Cartoons by the Grand Forks Herald's Award Winning Cartoonist.... Grand Forks: Grand Forks Herald, 1963.
