= Andrew Freeman (inventor) =

American electrical engineer

Andrew Freeman (March 10, 1909 – January 17, 1996) was an American electrical engineer and the inventor of the electric block heater for automobiles.

Andrew L. Freeman was born in Upham, North Dakota. He attended the University of North Dakota in Grand Forks, North Dakota, where he majored in electrical engineering. He served as general manager of Minnkota Power Cooperative from 1940 to 1982. Since 2004, Minnkota Power Cooperative, Inc. has sponsored the Andrew Freeman Design Innovation Competition at the University of North Dakota College of Engineering and Mines.

Freeman first developed a block heater around 1947, and received U.S. Patent #2487326 on November 8, 1949. In 1947, Freeman co-founded and served as president of Five Star Manufacturing Company of East Grand Forks, MN to manufacture headbolt heaters.
