= Richard St. Clair =

American composer

- Born: Richard Collins St. Clair; September 21, 1946 (age 80); Jamestown, North Dakota, U.S.

Richard Collins St. Clair (born September 21, 1946) is an American composer, pedagogue, poet and pianist.

== Life History and Musical Career ==
In the 17th c. St. Clairs (or Sinclairs) emigrated from the British Isles to New England as part of the early colonization of North America. Richard St. Clair's maternal ancestors emigrated from Norway and Sweden to the American Upper Midwest (in particular, Minnesota) in the latter part of the 19th century along with hundreds of thousands of other Scandinavians who settled there at that time. So many Norwegian immigrants settled in the Upper Midwest that it is locally referred to as "Little Norway." His paternal ancestors hailed from England and Scotland and were both riders on the Mayflower as well as military men in the American War of Independence.

Richard St. Clair was born in Jamestown, North Dakota. The following year his family moved to Grand Forks, North Dakota, a larger city with much greater musical and cultural opportunities than those of his birthplace. The musical environs of Grand Forks served as the foundation for his life in music. The city boasted its own symphony orchestra, a major university with an active music department, a concert series featuring prominent soloists, and a school system that emphasized music education. For years he sang in both the Centralian concert chorus of his high school (Grand Forks Central High School) and the sanctuary choir of the church (First Presbyterian) which he attended as a child and adolescent. He also sang in the Choral Union, a collaboration between the University of North Dakota and the Grand Forks community. It was these singing experiences that imbued him with a love of choral music which has carried him throughout his musical life, with hundreds of choral compositions to his credit.

Music ran through his family. His maternal great-grandfather Ludvig Svendsen Bogen played in the Norwegian King's Band and his grandfather Sven Fredrik Bogen was a band conductor who played and taught many different instruments; his maternal grandmother was a piano teacher who was reputed for being able to transpose any song into any key. His paternal grandmother was a gifted pianist. His father, Foster York St. Clair (1905–1994) – a Harvard-educated English literature scholar, university professor and poet – and his mother, Elna Ruth Bogen St. Clair (1912–1974) – a business college teacher – were both amateur musicians and classical music-lovers. St. Clair from a very early age fell in love with the music of Mozart, Mendelssohn and Tchaikovsky, which were played in his home on fragile 78-rpm records. At age 3 he began taking piano lessons. By age 16 he was starting to write music, mainly for chorus and organ, inspired by Gustav Holst, Flor Peeters, Randall Thompson and Paul Hindemith.

A turning point in his musical life came in 1963 when he attended on scholarship the International Music Camp in the International Peace Garden on the North Dakota-Canada border. Amidst the intense musical environment, his performances at the piano, together with his then piano teacher Paul Lundquist, were noticed by Professor Earnest Harris, head of the piano department at Moorhead State College (later renamed Minnesota State University Moorhead). Harris, steeped in the pedagogic tradition of Theodor Leschetizky and Carl Czerny and a former pupil of Leonard Shure, gave him a full scholarship to study piano, though he did not continue with his piano studies afterwards, preferring to focus on creating his own music.

Early in his music education, St. Clair was enamored of the music of Edvard Grieg, from whose music he acquired a love for miniaturism and compact musical invention. He was also deeply moved by the music of Robert Schumann, especially the great C Major Fantasia, opus 17. In college, he became engrossed in the piano music of Mozart, Schubert, Schumann and Bartok, playing and absorbing their music over and over again on his Poole upright piano (which he tuned himself since he could not afford a professional piano tuner) in his dingy third-story Cambridge walk-up. This way he acquired a deep love for classical-romantic music, whose influence has always been strongly present in his own compositions.

In 1970 St. Clair made a solo piano appearance in a recital of his own music in Newburyport, Massachusetts. Reviewer Ned Brown made the following prophetic observations:

We admired St. Cair's expansive genius, his dynamic keyboard skill and his personal modesty. At 24, Richard St. Clair is firmly launched on a musical career which offers great possibilities.

St. Clair, following in his father's footsteps, began his studies at Harvard University in Cambridge (Massachusetts) where in 1969 he earned his Bachelor of Arts (A.B.) with honors in music composition, the first of many Harvard students to write a musical work in lieu of a thesis. While an undergraduate he studied piano techniques (sight-reading and figured bass) with Luise Vosgerchian, harmony with James Haar and John MacIvor Perkins, counterpoint with James Yannatos and Alejandro Enrique Planchart, form and analysis with Luciano Berio, and composition with Billy Jim Layton and Leon Kirchner.

St. Clair's music and the music of his fellow classmate, John Adams, both reacted against the then prevailing academic emphasis on writing music after the manner of twelve-tone and avant-garde composers, most often meaning the music of Arnold Schoenberg and that of Anton Webern, the latter who set the stage for the academic avant-garde that was to emerge in Europe (Boulez, Stockhausen) and America (Carter, Babbitt) in the 1940s into the 1960s and prevails in many quarters even today. Both St. Clair and Adams rejected that school of thought, Adams turning to minimalism (e.g. "Short Ride in a Fast Machine") and St. Clair turning to neo-classicism (e.g. Piano Sonata no. 1). Both St. Clair and Adams have evolved considerably since they first emerged in the 1960s.

In graduate school at Harvard he went on to earn his Master of Arts (A.M.) in 1973 and his Doctor of Philosophy (Ph.D.) in 1978, both degrees in music composition. During his student years he was awarded several prizes for his compositions. At Harvard he studied composition with Roger Sessions, Leon Kirchner, Earl Kim, and David Del Tredici. He studied piano privately with Paul Lundquist, Earnest Harris, and Leonard Shure.

In his first year as a graduate student in the Harvard University Department of Music doctoral program, St. Clair was encouraged by a fellow student to consult the controversial Bostonian piano pedagogue Margaret Chaloff (1896-1977), a colorful dowager then in her late 70s, to learn her particular brand of "Russian School" piano technique, an approach which appealed also to jazz musicians such as Keith Jarrett, George Wein, Donald Rubinstein, and Herbie Hancock. Her teaching was frequently entangled with her metaphysical eccentricity and whims. She was fascinated with the occult and encouraged amongst some of her followers the development of esoteric practices (life readings, channeling, reincarnation, psychometry, palmistry, Tarot cards, etc.). This side of "Madame Chaloff," as she was called, fed into her mystique as a mercurial and often controlling guru. Her ill-suited successor as piano teacher and in league with Chaloff for many years was composer Avram David (1930-2004), whose psychological abuse of St. Clair, modeled after Chaloff, displayed classic patterns of cultic control.

St. Clair made his debut as a composer with his performance of his avant-garde Piano Piece no. 1 at the Marlboro Music Festival in 1967 as an invitee of his teacher, Leon Kirchner; there he was encouraged by Director Rudolf Serkin to continue to pursue a career in composition. Serkin's laconic comment on St. Clair's Piano Piece No. 1, "It has line." Both Shure and Serkin discouraged St. Clair from pursuing a career as a concert pianist, though St. Clair occasionally performed his own piano compositions in concert. Although his student years were turbulent, he emerged as a successful composer of broad stylistic tastes.

His Missa Syllabica for SATB chorus performed by Boston's Coro Allegro drew the praise of Boston Globe critic Susan Larson for its 'lush, soft-edged harmonic vocabulary...[and] burst of melismatic ecstasy.'

Of his 1994 freely atonal cycle Moon Flowers: Album of 50 Haiku-Moments for Solo Piano on the occasion of the 300th anniversary of the death of the great haiku poet, Matsuo Basho (1644-1694), noted haiku poet Dee Evetts wrote

Richard St. Clair performed his Moon Flowers: Album of Haiku-Moments for Solo Piano. This hypnotic string of phrases was reminiscent (for this listener) of the shakuhachi tradition, 'beads threaded on silence.'

St. Clair's music has been heard far and wide from South America to Europe to Asia and across the United States and Canada. Difficult to describe but generally in the broad category of Neoromanticism (music), his music runs the gamut of pure tonality to avant-garde atonality.

Of his extended motet, Today's Lord's Prayer, noted organist and choir director Joanne Vollendorf Rickards wrote

Our choir was honored...to perform the premiere of Today's Lord's Prayer, ... [a] spine tingling anthem. It was truly spectacular.

His Piano Pieces no. 1 and no.2 composed in his college years are intensely atonal and show the influence of Karlheinz Stockhausen. Since then, however, he has turned to a more approachable style following the tradition of 20th-century masters including Igor Stravinsky, Dmitri Shostakovich, Béla Bartók and Arnold Schoenberg, the latter who taught his teachers Earl Kim and Leon Kirchner. His Love-Canzonettes and other works for chorus and his many ragtime works for piano are completely tonal and classically conceived, as is his Lyric Symphony and his chamber opera, Taema. His string quartets and much of his other music including his Concertino for Wind Band are tonally more challenging and structurally freer. For instance, his First String Quartet is structured freely around the octatonic scale, as is the second movement of his Symphony for String Orchestra, while his Second String Quartet employs a twelve-tone row.

Of St. Clair's The Lamentations of Shinran for Soprano, Tenor and String Quartet, Boston Phoenix music reviewer Lloyd Schwartz wrote in February 2000:

St. Clair has created a fascinating sound world, both charged and atmospheric. His is a stirring and original voice.

Composer David Cleary, writing of the same work in 21st Century Music said,

This nearly half-hour long setting of 13th-century Buddhist poems proves fascinating from start to finish, exhibiting numerous deeply-felt variants on oriental sensitivity and exquisite melancholy.

Writing in New Music Connoisseur (2005), Cleary commented as follows on St. Clair's 2005 cycle, "Songs from the Chinese":

Asian verse has inspired some of Richard St. Clair's most ambitious efforts. Thus it's no surprise that his "Songs from the Chinese", a setting of ten Yuan dynasty poems scored for voice, flute, contrabass, and piano, is satisfying to hear. One encounters pentatonic touches sprinkled throughout its mildly spiced tonal language, but never to the point of parody. And the wide-ranging textual tone elicits comparably varied approaches to vocal and instrumental writing. Yet there's a charming and heartfelt overall ethos to the cycle that ably binds disparate moods.

After twenty-five years of study and practice in Buddhism, St. Clair returned to his Christian roots, exploring and adopting traditional (but non-sectarian) Christianity. His latest works for solo voice and for chorus and orchestra express his rediscovered spiritual home.

During a two-year period, St. Clair composed a total of 520 chorale-style hymns, which were subsequently published in two major collections. In The Hymn, Joshua Taylor offered a critical review of St. Clair’s psalter, The Medford Psalmbook:

A 21st Century Psalter, provides an example of the personal nature of the psalms and their unique ability to resonate with the human spirit and emotion. St. Clair’s collection joins a number of other twenty-first- century psalters which demonstrate the renewed relevance of these texts for composers and singers alike.

In 1969 and 1970 he taught piano at the New England Conservatory in Boston (Massachusetts), and from 1973 to 1977 he taught music history and composition at his alma mater, Harvard University. He also served on the music faculty of Phillips Exeter Academy and Phillips Academy (Andover). Attempting to live the frugal life of a typical composer, he supported himself by taking day jobs at Harvard and MIT. He retired from MIT in 2015. His second symphony, entitled "Hallelujah Choruses" with SATB choir and orchestra, is a bold, if radical, expression of praise unto God, the sole lyrics for the entire 50-minute neo-classic work is the word, "Hallelujah" = Praise God.

== Compositions ==
=== Works for theatre ===
- 2013–2014 Taema: A Noh Opera, Chamber opera in two acts for small orchestra, SATB chorus and soli; libretto, 15th century Noh play by Zeami
- 1991-2018 Little Ida's Flowers: A Mini-Opera for Children for Chamber Group, based on the story by Hans Christian Andersen
- 1990-2019 Beowulf: A Classical Melodrama in Four Scenes for Chorus, Soloists, and Piano (Libretto adapted from the verse translation by H. W. Lumsden, 1881)
- 2021-2024 The Sylph and the Maiden: 26 Dance Scenes for Two Flutes

=== Works for orchestra ===
- 1969–1970 Piano Concerto no. 1 ["Concerto a Capriccio"], for Piano and Orchestra, opus 16
- 2001 Song of Sorrow: In Memoriam 9/11 for Solo Violin and Orchestra, orchestration of chamber version
- 2010 Rhapsody for Symphony Orchestra
- 2018 Clarinet Concerto for B-flat Clarinet and Orchestra
- 2018 Piano Concerto no. 2 for 2 Pianos and Orchestra ["Amen Concerto"] (orchestral arrangement of 1972 concert band version)
- 2020 Symphonic Declamations for Orchestra (begun 1996)
- 2023 Piano Concerto no. 3 for Piano and Orchestra (begun 1994)
- 2024 Symphony no. 1: Hallelujah Choruses for Chorus and Orchestra on the single word "Hallelujah"
- 2025 Hello! for Orchestra
- 2025 Symphony no. 2 in A ("Lyric Symphony") for Orchestra (begun 2014)
- 2026 Symphony no. 3 for Winds, Brass and Percussion (begun 2020)

=== Works for concert band ===
- 1971–1972 Piano Concerto No. 2 for 2 Pianos and Concert Band ("Amen Concerto"), opus 31 (arranged for symphony orchestra, 2018)

=== Masses and sacred music ===
- 1963–1964 Prophecy of Micah, for Chorus SATB and organ (or piano), opus 1
- 1963–1964 Lamb of God, for Chorus SATB a capella, opus 1A
- 1990–1991 Missa Syllabica, for Chorus SATB a capella, opus 51 – text: Latin Mass Ordinary
- 1990 Lord, Make Me An Instrument of Thy Peace, for Chorus SATB a capella, opus 52 – text: Francis of Assisi
- 1990 Heaven, Dialogue for Chorus SATB and Echo Chorus SATB, opus 52a – text: George Herbert
- 1990 Magnificat, for Female Chorus SSAA, opus 56
- 1993 Requiem for SATB Chorus a Cappella (in Latin)
- 1997 Today's Lord's Prayer, for Chorus SATB a capella, opus 96
- 2009/2021 There Is A Spirit, for Chorus SATB a capella – text: James Nayler (1660)
- 2020 Usquequo, Domine ["How Long, O Lord, Wilt Thou Forget Me?"] for Chorus SATB a Capella (Latin text: Psalm 12, Vulgate)
- 2020 The Beatitudes of Christ for SATB Choir a Capella (Gospel of Matthew 5:1-10)
- 2021 The Twenty-Third Psalm of David: A Requiem in These Times of Pandemic Loss for Chorus SAATB, Oboe, Trumpet and French Horn
- 2021 The Lord Bless You and Keep You for Mixed Voices, Accompanied (piano or organ) (Text: Numbers 6:24-26)
- 2021 The Song of Simeon for High Voice and Piano (Gospel of Luke 2:25-32)
- 2021 Serenity - A Prayer for SATB Chorus a Capella; Lyrics: Serenity Prayer by Reinhold Niebuhr
- 2021 Christ My Refuge for High Voice and Piano; Lyrics: Poem by Mary Baker Eddy
- 2021 Prayer on the Third Step for Chorus SATB a Capella (Anonymous text)
- 2021 The Highest Glory: A Lesson for a Capella Chorus SATB (KJV John VII:18)
- 2021 MISSA DE ANGELIS (Mass of the Angels) for SATB Choir a Capella (Kyrie - Gloria - Credo - Sanctus - Agnus Dei) Based on Mass VIII in the Kyriale
- 2021 Ministering Angels for Soprano and Keyboard (on the poem of that title by Adelaide Procter)
- 2021 OUR FATHER, ADORABLE ONE for Double Chorus and Organ
- 2022 Thine, O Lord, Is the Greatness for SATB Chorus and Organ (Text: I Chronicles 29:11-13)
- 2022 Great Is the Lord A Psalm of David for Soprano and Piano (Psalm 40, excerpts, ESV)
- 2022 MISA ESPAÑOLA A Symphonic Mass in Spanish for SATB Chorus and Orchestra
- 2022 The Lord Is My Shepherd (Psalm 23) for Solo Voice or Unison SATB Choir
- 2022 O Cross, More Splendid than All the Stars for SATB Chorus and Piano (English version) (Original Latin antiphon: O Crux Splendidior)
- 2022 Lift up Your Heads, O Ye Gates for SATB Chorus and Organ (King James Version of Psalms 24:7-10)
- 2023 The Medford Hymn Book: 215 Hymns for SATB Chorus a Capella Original melodies and harmonizations, with some 130 texts by the composer himself
- 2023 My Own Hymnal for SATB Chorus a Capella, the composer's collection of 135 hymns with his own texts
- 2024 The Medford Psalmbook Original tunes and harmonizations for all 150 Psalms in the Bible, for SATB Chorus a Cappella
- 2024 Mass for World Peace for SATB Choir and Piano; Traditional Text amplified by the Composer
- 2024 Te Deum Laudamus for SATB Chorus and Organ; text of traditional hymn translated into English
- 2024 Hannah's Song for Women's Chorus SSAA and Piano; text: 1 Samuel 2:1-10 (Bible)
- 2024 We Give You Thanks and Praise O God for Alto and Piano
- 2024 Twelve Days of Christmas Carols for SATB Chorus a Cappella; 12 new songs
- 2025 The Second Medford Hymn Book: 152 New Hymns for SATB Chorus a Cappella
- 2025 Advent Concerto on the great "O" Antiphons of Advent, for SATB Chorus and Organ
- 2025 A Ceremony of Hymns for SATB Chorus and Organ, inspired by and based upon four Latin Gregorian chants
- 2026 Odes of Solomon for SATB Chorus and Organ, on Christian devotional texts from the early second century

=== Other works for chorus ===
- 1969–1995 Alas, Good Friend, for Chorus SATB a capella, opus 83 – text: Percy Bysshe Shelley
- 1971 Peace Is Life for Chorus SATB a capella, opus 29 – text: Anonymous
- 1971–1972 Yonder, for Chorus SATB a capella, opus 30 – text: Gerard Manley Hopkins, "The Leaden Echo and the Golden Echo"
- 1975–1995 A Higher Glory, for Chorus SATB a capella, opus 82
- 1989 Help Me, O Power Above, for Chorus SATB a capella, opus 41 – text: by the Composer
- 1990 The Windhover, for 4-Part Women's Chorus, opus 50 – text: Gerard Manley Hopkins
- 1990 Love-Canzonettes, for Chorus SATB a capella, opus 62 – text: John Dryden
- 1990 The Clear Vision, for Men's Chorus (TTBB), opus 64 – text: John Greenleaf Whittier
- 1994–1995 Evening Anthem, for Chorus SATB a capella, opus 85 – text: by the Composer
- 1995–1996 In Praise of Our Loves, for Chorus SATB and Orchestra, opus 90 [Revised, 2020]
- 1996 Three Short Sandburg Choruses, for Unison Choir (SA) and (TB), opus 91 – text: from Carl Sandburg's "Chicago Poems"
  1. Fog
  2. Nocturne in a Deserted Brickyard
  3. Grass
- 1996 High Flight for Chorus SATB a capella with discant high soprano on the poem by John Gillespie Magee, in memory of the Space Shuttle Challenger astronauts
- 1997 Flower of the Dharma, for Chorus SATB, Piano, and Percussion (or Chorus SATB and Orchestra), opus 93 – text: Lotus Sutra excerpts (withdrawn)
- 1997 Two Songs of Innocence, for Chorus SATB a capella, opus 99 – text: William Blake's "Songs of Innocence." No. 1: On the Ecchoing Green; no. 2: Night
- 1993–1997 Ascent, for Small Chorus of High Voices (or for two sopranos and one alto), opus 100 – text: Anne Morrow Lindbergh
- 2008 Madrigals for Spring, for Chorus SATB a capella, opus 61 (Original version 1990) – text: Poetic Fragments by Percy Bysshe Shelley
- 2018 Give Me Your Tired, Your Poor for SATB Chorus a Capella: Lyrics by Emma Lazarus, "The New Colossus"
- 2019 The Dharma of Ecclesiastes on selections from the Book of Ecclesiastes in the Jewish Bible; for SATB chorus, a Capella
- 2019 An Autumn Stroll for SATB Choir, String Quartet and Piano; text, original poems by the composer
- 2020 Hope, My Closest Companion for SATB Chorus a Capella, text: Affirmations found on the Internet
- 2020 THESEUS: A Dramatic Cantata after Bacchylides for SATB Chorus, Soli, Flute, Cello and Percussion [Text: Ode 17 by Bacchylides, c. 518 – c. 451 BCE, Translation by William Mullen]

=== Vocal music ===
- 1964 To Hear an Oriole Sing for Soprano and Piano; Poem by Emily Dickinson
- 1966 From Mozart for Baritone and Piano, text: William C. Mullen
- 1968 She Weeps over Rahoon, for Contralto and Piano, opus 5 – text: James Joyce
- 1969 Night-Leaves, for Baritone and Piano, text: William C. Mullen
- 1970 Songs of a Wayside Inn, for Mezzo-soprano and Piano, opus 22 – text: Henry Wadsworth Longfellow
- 1970–1971 Six Songs, for Soprano and Piano, opus 28 – text: Kenneth Patchen
- 1975/1989 A Round for Machaut, repeating canon in 4 keys for solo SATB voices or small SATB a capella Chorus, opus 40
- 1990 Moabit Liederbuch, for Soprano and Piano, opus 66 – text: Sonnets by Albrecht Haushofer (New Edition, 2020)
- 1993 Equinox, for Tenor and Piano, opus 88 – text: William C. Mullen
- 1994–1995 Desert Hallucinations, for Baritone and Cello, opus 78 – text: Donald Rubinstein
- 1990–1995 High Flight – In memory of the crew of the space shuttle, USS Challenger, which was destroyed in 1986 after launch, for Solo Soprano and Chorus SATB a capella, opus 81 – text: John G. Magee Jr.
- 1997 Songs of the Pure Land, for Mezzo-soprano and Piano, opus 101 – text: Japanese poems by Honen Shonin (Japan, 1133–1212)
- 1998 The Lamentations of Shinran, for Soprano, Tenor, and String Quartet, opus 104 – text: from Shozomatsu Wasan, by Shinran Shonin (Japan, 1173–1262) (2020 Edition)
- 1998 (2019 ed.)Two Life-Spring Songs for Coloratura Soprano and Piano, on poems by Aureet Bar-Yam
- 1999 Songlets, for Mezzo-soprano, Clarinet and Piano, opus 106 – text: Haiku by Issa Kobayashi
- 2000 Owl Night, for Soprano and Piano, opus 112 – text: Susan Spilecki, "Owl Night"
- 2005 Songs from the Chinese, 10 Songs for Soprano, Flute, Double Bass, and Piano – text: Chinese San Chu poems of the Yuan dynasty
- 2013 Others for Baritone, Violin and Piano – text: Jun Fujita
- 2014 A Night-Piece for Mezzo-Soprano and Piano - text: William Wordsworth
- 2014 Songs of the Buddha's Stone Footprints for Bass-Baritone, Percussion, Flute, Oboe and String Quartet, Text: from "A Waka Anthology, Vol. 1"
- 2013-16 Three Songs from Walt Whitman for Mezzo-Soprano, Flute and Piano
- 2017 Through the Seasons with Haiku Master Buson for Flute, Double Bass, Piano and Reciter, 38 newly discovered poems by Yosa Buson translated by Chris Drake
- 2017 In a Daffodil Valley for Soprano and Piano, 18 haiku by Eiko Yachimoto
- 2018 Songs of the Winter Sea, 11 songs for Soprano and Piano on tanka by an'ya
- 2018 The First Bird's Song for Soprano, Flute and Harp, 23 songs on haiku by Koko Kato
- 2018 Songs of Joy for Soprano, Flute, Violin and Cello; on three pentaptychs (groups of 5) of tanka by Joy McCall
- 2018 Remembrance: 10 Cherita for Soprano and Piano on Cherita Poems by Poet ai li
- 2018 Songs of a Waking Cosmos for Soprano and Piano on 10 Cherita Poems by the Composer
- 2019 Evocations of Spring and Autumn for Soprano and Piano (on 14 tanka by an'ya)
- 2016/2020 Return to Our Original Home: A Pure Land Buddhist Song for Soprano and Piano; text: Shandao
- 2015/2020 Birds: Four Songs for Soprano and Piano on poems by William Wordsworth
- 2021 Sorrow and Hope: A Prayer to Kuan Yin for Soprano and Piano

=== Chamber music ===
- 1967–1968 Dreamscapes, for Violin and Piano, opus 6
- 1968 Three Movements, for Violin and Piano, opus 7
- 1970 Duo-Sonata, for Two Violins, opus 20
- 1970 Christmas Trio, for Flute, Cello and Piano, opus 25
- 1972 Color Studies "Transfiguration", for Violin, Viola and Cello, opus 33
- 1975 Canzona, for String Quartet, opus 36
- 1978 Sonata for Solo Flute (withdrawn)
- 1989 Ragtime Caprice for Violin and Piano (2018 ed.)
- 1990 String Quartet no. 1, opus 59 [Revised, 2020]
- 1991 Sonata for Solo Violin [Revised, 2021]
- 1990–1996 Eucaphonies, for Brass Quintet, opus 89
- 1991–1993 String Quartet no. 2, opus 71
- 1994 rev.1996 Fantastic Rhapsody, for Trumpet, Violin and Piano, opus 76
- 1996 Inventings, for Flute and Oboe, opus 92
- 1997–2005 Three Movements for Wind Quintet, WoO
- 1998 The Lamentations of Shinran for Soprano, Tenor and String Quartet, on 16 poems by Shinran Shonin (2020 Edition)
- 1999 Seven Dhamma Lessons, for Speaker, Flute, Oboe, Piano and Percussion, opus 107
- 2000 Sonata for Clarinet and Piano, opus 108
- 2000 From "Children of the Sparrow", Musical Reactions to Haiku by Robert Gibson for Speaker, Flute and Piano, opus 113
- 2001 Song of Sorrow, In Memory of September 11, 2001, for Violin and Piano, opus 114
- 2005 String Quartet no. 3
- 2005 Outburst for Double Bass and Piano (also available for Cello and Piano)
- 2006 Explorations for Clarinet and Piano
- 2009 The Hermit for solo Double Bass, also in a version for solo Cello
- 2009 An Idyll for Solo Flute
- 2010 Energies for 4 Players for Flute, Violin, Double Bass, and Piano
- 2006–2013 Octatonic Fugue for String Quartet
- 2013 Karmic Dancing for Solo Flute
- 2014 Whimsies for Violin, Viola and Cello
- 2015 Sonata for Solo Cello
- 1978/2018 Nine Soliloquies for Solo Flute (extensively revised from 1978 edition, earlier edition withdrawn)
- 2018 Stabat Mater for String Quartet, also arranged for Consort of Viols
- 2019 Fantastic Rhapsody for Flute, Viola and Piano (new version on 1994 original)
- 2019 Study in Thirds for String Quintet
- 2020 Mystic Visions for Flute, Piano and Double Bass
- 2020 Sonata Appassionata for Cello and Piano
- 2020 Reminiscence for Violin and Piano
- 2020 String Quartet no. 4 ('Ad Fugam') (Eleven movements, in strict 4-part canon throughout)
- 2021 REMEMBRANCE for the Many Victims of COVID19 for Flute, Double Bass and Piano
- 2021 Truth A Song for Soprano and Piano on the Poem by Muriel Rada
- 2021 Our Father Meditation for Woodwind Quintet
- 2021 Two Paschal Elegies for Woodwind Quintet
- 2021 October: 26 Songs for Soprano and Flute on tanka by Joy McCall
- 2021-2024 The Sylph and the Maiden: 26 Dance Scenes for Two Flutes

=== Works for organ ===
- 1963 In Thy Name (1963 [original lost], 2022 reconstruction from memory)
- 1990 Testimonium, opus 48
- 1990 Two Classic Chorales
- 1995 Jubilance (revised 2021)
- 2007 Wrestling with Angels (expanded from 1997 version), inspired by "Angels" by Carl Ruggles
- (1997-2009 Organ Mass: Kyrie; Gloria; Credo; Sanctus; Agnus Dei) - withdrawn
- 2016/2020 Praise the Glorious Light (Revised Edition, earlier 2016 version withdrawn)
- 2025 Choral Variations on 16 Favorite Gregorian Chants
- 2025 Five Organ Sonatas: No. 1 in A; No. 2 in C; No. 3 in F; No. 4 in C minor; No. 5 in F
- 2025 Symphony in D for Organ

=== Works for solo piano ===
- 1965 Three Romantic Pieces: Waltz - Melody - Dance
- 1966 Piano Piece no. 1, opus 3
- 1967 Piano Piece no. 2, opus 4
- 1968–1969 Sonata no. 1, opus 8
- 1969 Serenade, opus 9
- 1969 Fantasy, opus 10
- 1969 Divertimento, for Piano Four-Hands, opus 13
- 1969 Toccata-Rag, opus 14
- 1968–1970 Four Concert Dances, opus 15
- 1970 Rondo in F for Solo Piano (2010 ed.)
- 1970 Two Piano Pieces, opus 17
- 1970 Sonata no. 2, opus 18
- 1970 Eight Piano Pieces for Children, opus 21
- 1970 Five Folk-Pieces, opus 23
- 1970 Four Preludes and Counterpoints, opus 24
- 1971 Sonata no. 3, opus 27
- 1972 Batik, opus 32
- 1973 Sonata no. 4, opus 34
- 1974 Sonata no. 5, opus 35
- 1989 Seven Dedications – in honor of Aaron Copland, Igor Stravinsky, Carl Ruggles, Charles Ives, Alan Hovhaness, Roger Sessions and Arnold Schoenberg, opus 39
- 1989 Touch-Tones: Four Avant-garde Pieces for Solo Piano
- 1989 Ragañera, opus 42
- 1989 Champion Rag, opus 43
- 1989 Ragtime Serenade, opus 44
- 1989 Blue Rag Espagnole, opus 45
- 1989 Sentimental Rag, opus 42
- 1989–1990 Starry-eyed Rag, opus 49
- 1989 Iron Filings, opus 60
- 1989 Short and Sweet Rag, opus 70
- 1989 Sparkling Rag, opus 72
- 1989 Persistence Rag, opus 75
- 1989–1990 Etiquette Rag, opus 80
- 1990 Jubilant Rag, opus 54
- 1990 Peloponnesian Rag, opus 55
- 1990 Amendments, opus 65
- 1990 Easy Sonata in C Major, a Completion of Ludwig van Beethoven's fragmentary sonata, WoO 51
- 1990–1992 Variations on a Hallowe'en Costume, opus 68
- 1990–1997 Suite for the Piano Alone, opus 102
- 1993 Plaint for Somalia, opus 69
- 1993–1994 Ballade in D for Piano, opus 77
- 1994 ...suggestions..., opus 73
- 1994 Moon Flowers (50 Haiku-Moments for Solo Piano), opus 74
- 1994–1995 Sonata no. 6, opus 84
- 1997 Ragtime Sonata (Sonata no. 7), opus 97
- 1997 Beautiful Mountain Rag, opus 98
- 1998 Tango Request, opus 103
- 1999 Adagio Espressivo for Solo Piano
- 2000 Nocturne in G, opus 109
- 2000 Odysseus Rag, opus 110
- 2000 Five Thoughtful Pieces, opus 111
- 2008 Sonata no. 8
- 1998–2010 Bachiana Dodecafonica: 5 Preludes and Fugues
- 2010 Sonatina (Withdrawn) See: Sonata no. 10
- 2011 Bachiana Dodecafonica (Expanded edition: 6 Preludes and Fugues)
- 2010–2012 Introduction to the Piano: 32 Piano Pieces for Beginning Pianists
- 1999-2013 Dodecafughetta In Memoriam: Glenn Gould
- 2010/2017 Sonata No. 9 in Olden Style
- 2015 Petite Sonatine
- 2017 Sonata no. 10 (originally Sonatina [2010] but considerably expanded)
- 2017 Transcendental Studies in Twelve Movements
- 2018 Vocalises in 8 movements
- 2018 Melody in one movement
- 2012/2019 Sonata no. 11 (formerly Ballade no. 2, expanded and revised)
- 2019 Three Musical Moments
- 1989/2019 Second Ragtime Sonata (Sonata no. 12)
- 2019 Sonata no. 13
- 2020 Album for the Young Pianist: 31 Pieces Easy to Difficult
- 2020 Six Strange Waltzes (original sketch 2009; fully edited and revised 2020)
- 2020 Blue Moments, Two short, Jazz-influenced pieces
- 2020 Funeral Day: The Victims of COVID19
- 2020 Prélude Sérieux pour Piano
- 2020 Encore! for Piano Solo
- 2020 A Game of Chords
- 2021 Piano Sonata 14
- 2021 Toccata Impromptu
- 2021 Spur of the Moment (27-28 April 2021)
- 2021 Fantasy Moments

=== Works for harpsichord ===
- 1990/1998 Toccata Moderna, opus 105

=== Works for carillon ===
- 1964 Statement for Bells, opus 2
- 1997 Diamond Cutter, opus 94
- 2018 Rejouissance for Bells for carillon

=== Arrangements of other composers ===
- Ut heremita solus by Johannes Ockeghem, untexted motet arr. for String Quartet and for Recorder Quartet
- Missa Mente tota by Adrian Willaert, transcribed for 6-voice a cappella chorus
- Missa Gaudeamus by Josquin des Prez, transcribed for 4-voice a cappella chorus
- Missa Sine nomine by Adrian Willaert, transcribed for 5-voice a cappella chorus
- Adieu mes amours by Josquin des Prez, French chanson a 4 transcribed for three voices and lute
- C'est boccané de soy tenir by Adrian Willaert, 4-voice French chanson
- Four Basque Christmas Carols for 3 or 4 voices, harmonized and arranged by Richard St. Clair

== Poetry ==
- 1989-2007 Fixed Forms: Sestinas, Sonnets, and Other Regulated Poems
- 2016 A Promise Kept: A Tanka Sequence (English/Japanese)
- 2017 Nature's Bounty: A Modern Waka Collection
- 2019 A Century of Sonnets: One Hundred Poems by Richard St. Clair
- 2023 The 135 Hymns of Richard St. Clair - text of musical hymns by the composer

== Bibliography ==
- Wolfgang Suppan, Armin Suppan: Das Neue Lexikon des Blasmusikwesens, 4. Auflage, Freiburg-Tiengen, Blasmusikverlag Schulz GmbH, 1994, ISBN 3-923058-07-1
- Paul E. Bierley, William H. Rehrig: The heritage encyclopedia of band music : composers and their music, Westerville, Ohio: Integrity Press, 1991, ISBN 0-918048-08-7
- E. Ruth Anderson: Contemporary American composers – A biographical dictionary, Second edition, Boston: G. K. Hall, 1982, 578 p., ISBN 978-0-8161-8223-7
- E. Ruth Anderson: Contemporary American composers – A biographical dictionary, 1st ed., Boston: G. K. Hall, 1976, 513 p., ISBN 0-8161-1117-0
- Who's Who in America 2009, 63rd ed., Marquis Who's Who, 2008, ISBN 978-0-8379-7017-2
- The American Piano Concerto Compendium (Music Finders) Rowman & Littlefield Publishers; Second edition (June 20, 2018), 322 p. ISBN 978-1538112335
