= Polygone =

Military base in Europe

The Multinational Aircrew Electronic Warfare Tactics Facility Polygone, known more briefly as Polygone, is an electronic warfare tactics range located on the border between Germany and France. It is a tri-national facility operated by France, Germany, and the United States.

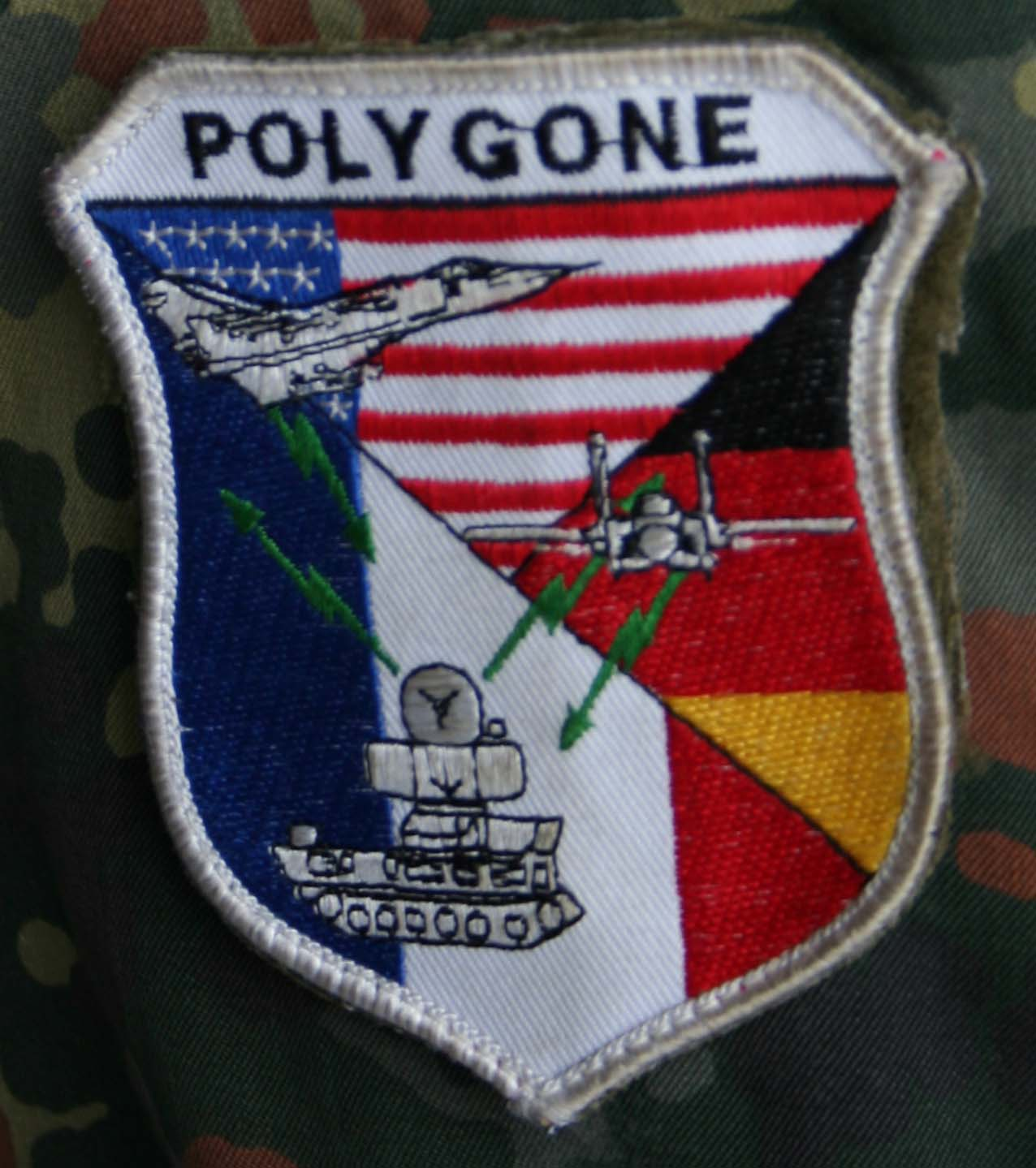

== Purpose ==
The range, also referred to as the Multi-national Aircrew Electronic Warfare Tactics Facility (MAEWTF), is jointly operated by personnel from the United States, German, and French air forces.

== Training areas ==
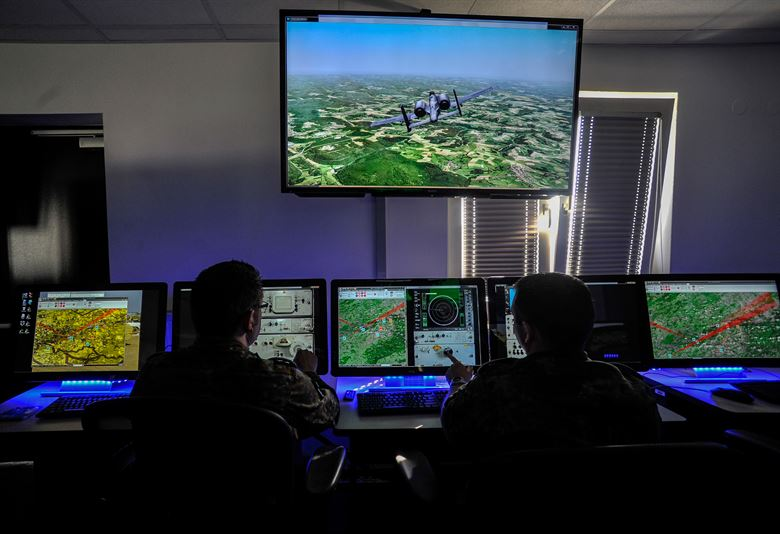
Multinational Aviation Live Virtual Constructive Training System exercise at the Polygone Control Center.

The particular sites of the range are coordinated by CCC systems provided by Computer Application Services (www.casltd.co.uk) - SPICCCS at RAF Spadeadam & EPICCCS at Polygone. These systems additionally provide debrief products for aircrew.

Training sites are in:

- Bann Alpha (Germany)
- Bann Bravo; with the Polygone Coordination Center (PCC), responsible for the co-ordination oft the missions
- Pirmasens-Grünbühl (Germany)
- Zweibrücken-Oberauerbach (Germany)
- Grostenquin (France)
- Chenevières (France)
- Épinal (France)

== Civil-military ATM co-ordination ==
In order to provide civil / military air traffic management co-ordination the EUROCONTROL software tools ADMAR and ADMAR 2000 have been used. These products were replaced by CIMACT in 2005.
