= 430 Tactical Helicopter Squadron =

Canadian military flying unit

- Active: 1943–1945; 1951–1970; 1971–Present
- Country: Canada
- Branch: (Canada) Royal Canadian Air Force
- Role: Tactical Helicopter
- Nicknames: City of Sudbury; Silver Falcon
- Mottos: Celeriter certoque (Swiftly and surely)
- Battle honours: Fortress Europe 1943-1944; France and Germany 1944-1945; Normandy 1944; Arnhem; Rhine; Afghanistan

430 Tactical Helicopter Squadron is a unit of the Canadian Forces under the Royal Canadian Air Force. It operates Bell CH-146 Griffons from CFB Valcartier, near Quebec City in Quebec, Canada.

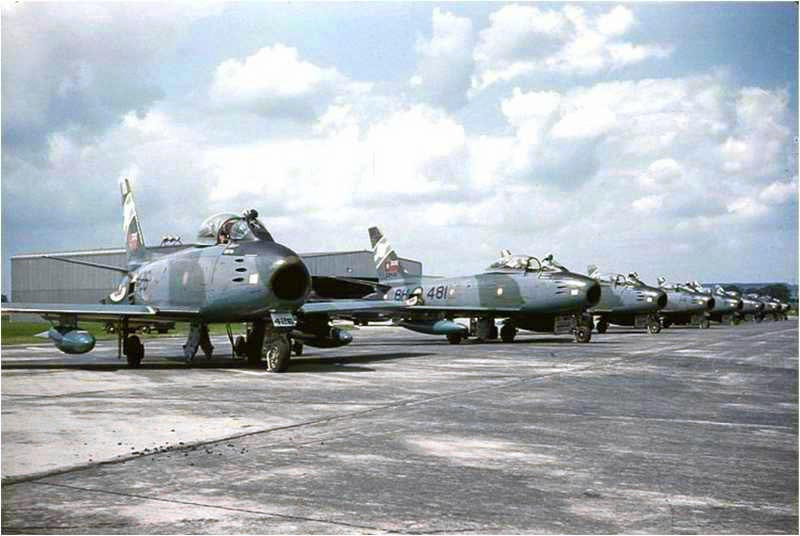
No. 430 Squadron Sabres at RCAF Station Grostenquin, 1960

== History ==
No. 430 Squadron RCAF was a unit of the Royal Canadian Air Force formed during World War II as the "City of Sudbury" squadron in 1943. Initially created as an army co-operation squadron, 430 was redesignated as a fighter reconnaissance unit later that year. The unit was stationed in England, France, Belgium, the Netherlands, and Germany, and flew photo reconnaissance missions in support of planning for the Normandy landings. After D-Day, missions included before-and-after photography of attacks on V-1 flying bomb launch sites and support for ground forces. 430 Squadron was disbanded in Germany in August 1945.

In the Cold War period, the squadron was reformed in November 1951 at RCAF Station North Bay, flying the Canadair F-86 Sabre. It was given the nickname Silver Falcon. 430 Fighter Squadron went to 2 Wing RCAF Station Grostenquin near Grostenquin, France in September 1952. The squadron was located at Grostenquin until deactivation in September 1962.

430 Fighter Squadron was reactivated at 3 Wing Zweibrücken, West Germany in February 1963, and transitioned to the Canadair CF-104 Starfighter. The squadron moved to 1 Wing Lahr, West Germany in February 1969 until it was disbanded in May 1970.

The unit reformed again in 1971 as a French-language Canadian Forces tactical helicopter squadron at Valcartier and known officially as 430^{e} Escadron tactique d'hélicoptères. There it operated the Bell CH-136 Kiowa and the Bell CH-135 Twin Huey in support of 5 Canadian Mechanized Brigade Group. The unit transitioned to the CH-146 Griffon in 1994.

== Operations ==
The squadron was deployed as part of the United Nations Mission in Haiti (UNMIH) and also provided core personnel to the Rotary Wing Aviation Unit of the Multinational Force and Observers on peacekeeping operations in the Sinai.

== Aircraft ==
- Curtiss Tomahawk Mk. I & II
- North American Mustang Mk. I
- Supermarine Spitfire Mk. XIV
- Canadair Sabre
- Canadair CF-104 Starfighter
- Bell CH-135 Twin Huey
- Bell CH-136 Kiowa
- Bell CH-146 Griffon

== Bibliography ==
- 430 Squadron History Retrieved 2016-04-14
