= Robert Sokolowski =

American philosopher (born 1934)

Monsignor Robert Sokolowski (born 3 May 1934) is an American philosopher and Catholic priest who serves as the Elizabeth Breckenridge Caldwell Professor of Philosophy at The Catholic University of America.

Sokolowski's philosophical research is focused primarily on the discipline of phenomenology and interrelated sub-disciplines, though he has also written works from a theological perspective. He is known for his interpretation of Husserl, commonly known as "East-Coast Husserlianism" in academic circles.

Sokolowski has throughout his career maintained that philosophy begins with good distinctions.

== Life ==
=== Early life ===
Sokolowski was born on May 3, 1934, to Stanley A. Sokolowski and Maryann C. Drag in New Britain, Connecticut.

Sokolowski entered seminary formation at Theological College after being awarded a Basselin scholarship (named after Theodore B. Basselin), earning his bachelor's degree in philosophy from The Catholic University of America in 1956 and a master's degree in 1957. He then went to the Catholic University of Leuven, where he earned his S.T.B in Theology (1961) and his Ph.D. in Philosophy (1963). His dissertation was titled "The Formation of Husserl's Concept of Constitution." His dissertation was written under Fr. Herman Leo Van Breda, the man who saved Husserl's writings from destruction by the Nazis, and who subsequently founded the Husserl Archives at the Leuven Higher Institute of Philosophy.

=== Academic posts ===
Since earning his Ph.D. his entire teaching career has been at The Catholic University of America, with visiting posts at The New School for Social Research, University of Texas at Austin, Villanova University, and Yale University.
