= Theodore B. Basselin =

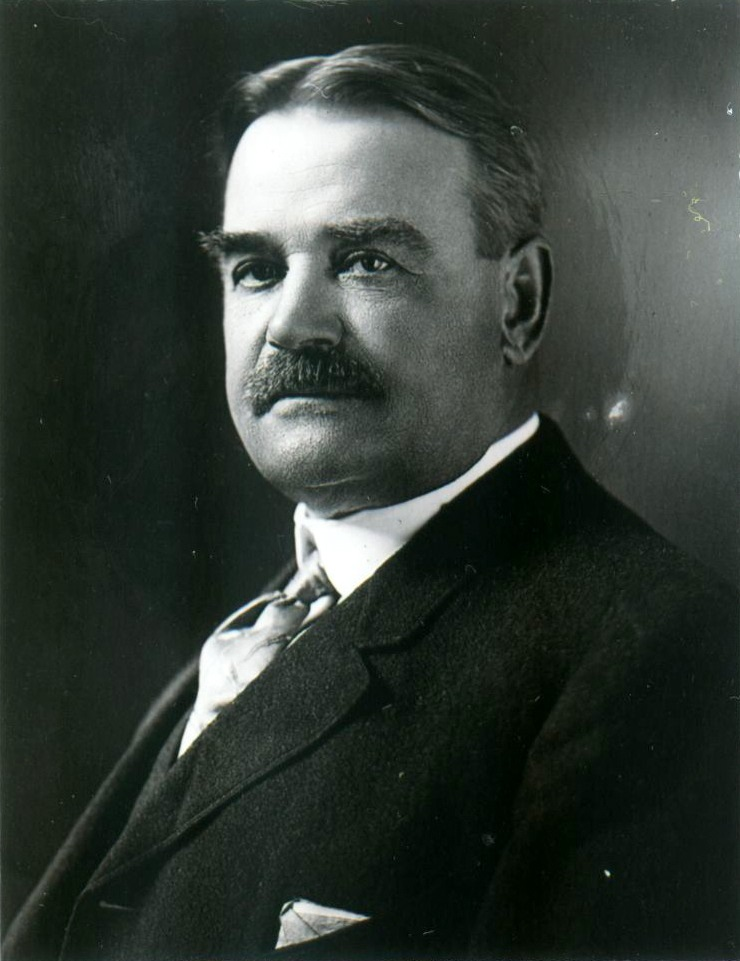
- Born: March 24, 1851; Grostenchen, France
- Died: April 21, 1914 (aged 63); Croghan, New York, United States
- Occupation: Businessman
- Known for: Philanthropy

Theodore B. Basselin (1851–1914) was an American lumber magnate, best remembered for an endowed scholarship he created at the Theological College of the Catholic University of America. The Basselin scholarship has funded the philosophical education of many notable American churchmen.

== Biography ==
Basselin was born on March 24, 1851, in Grostenchen, now Grostenquin, a village in Lorraine, France. He emigrated to the United States at the age of three with his parents, Dominique Basselin and his mother, Anna Basselin (née Pierson). His father died when he was ten years old, and his mother raised him in the principles of business as he ran the family's general store. Basselin attended Niagara University, graduating at the age of twenty-two before returning to his home town of Croghan, New York, and becoming involved in the timber trade.

He quickly accumulated a fortune in the lumber trade, owning several thousands of acres of timberland and employing hundreds of people at the time of his death. An innovation which contributed to his success was his practice of using felled hemlock logs left to rot after they had been stripped of their bark for use in leather production. This allowed him to turn a waste product into a source of income. He diversified his business interests later in life, becoming involved in furniture production, the Lowville and Beaver River Railroad Company, a paper company, an electric power company, and banking.

Basselin was active in the Democratic party and served two terms as Croghan town supervisor. He was a friend of David B. Hill who served as Governor from 1885 to 1891. In 1885 the state legislature created a Forest Commission which was one of the first state forestry agencies in the United States. Governor Hill appointed Basselin as one of three Commissioners to run the new agency. The Forest Commission had charge of the state Forest Preserve lands in the Adirondacks and Catskills and the responsibility of promoting forestry and forest fire protection statewide. He served on the Forest Commission for six years. During his tenure important progress was made in forest fire prevention, protection of state lands, and the establishment of the Adirondack Park.

Basselin died at his home in Croghan on April 21, 1914, from Bright's disease.

== Legacy ==
Basselin died a millionaire, and left a generous will. He gave each of his two cousins, his only living relatives, $100,000 each. He left money to support his nurse, housekeeper, and barn man for the rest of their lives. He was especially generous to the Roman Catholic Church, leaving $100,000 to the Order of Friars Minor in Croghan for the creation of a college in the town.

He is primarily remembered today for the endowment he created at Theological College at the Catholic University of America for the construction of a building and a department for the education of young seminarians studying for the Catholic priesthood. One hundred and ten thousand dollars went to erect Basselin Hall, while $500,000 was set aside to fund a scholarship for "the very best and brightest" seminarians. The Basselin scholarship still exists today; notable recipients include the scripture scholar Father Raymond E. Brown, philosophers Monsignor John F. Wippel and Monsignor Robert Sokolowski, as well as Raymond Cardinal Burke, Daniel Cardinal DiNardo, Donald Cardinal Wuerl, Bishop Michael F. Olson, Bishop Robert Barron, and Monsignor James Shea.

Basselin is also remembered as one of the most influential citizens of Croghan, New York. His mansion and family cemetery still stand as landmarks in the town today.

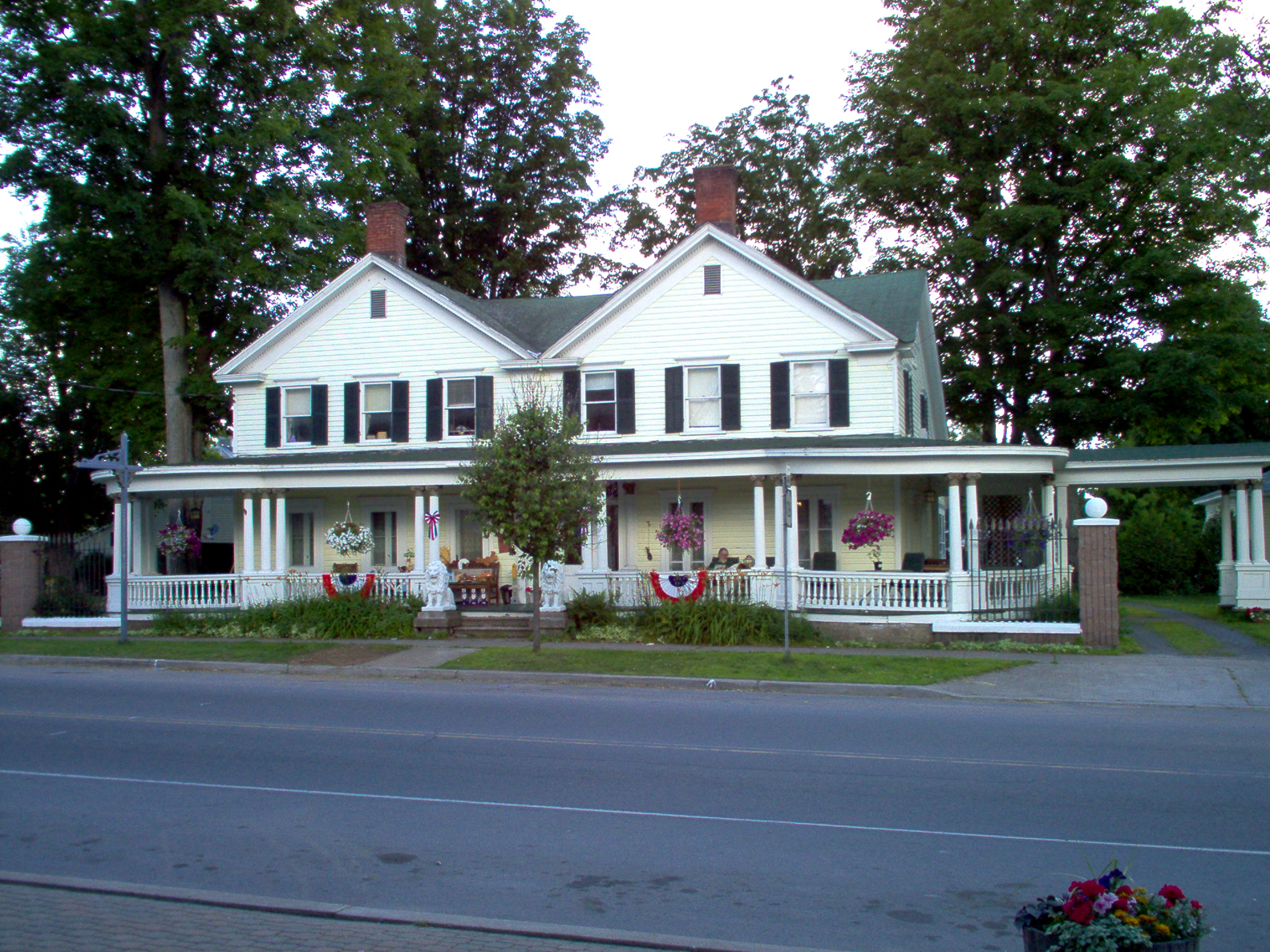
Theodore Basselin's family home in Croghan, NY. Built in 1859 and expanded during the late 1800s.
