= James Patrick Shea =

American Catholic priest (born 1975)

The Reverend Monsignor James Patrick Shea KCHS, Ph.L.
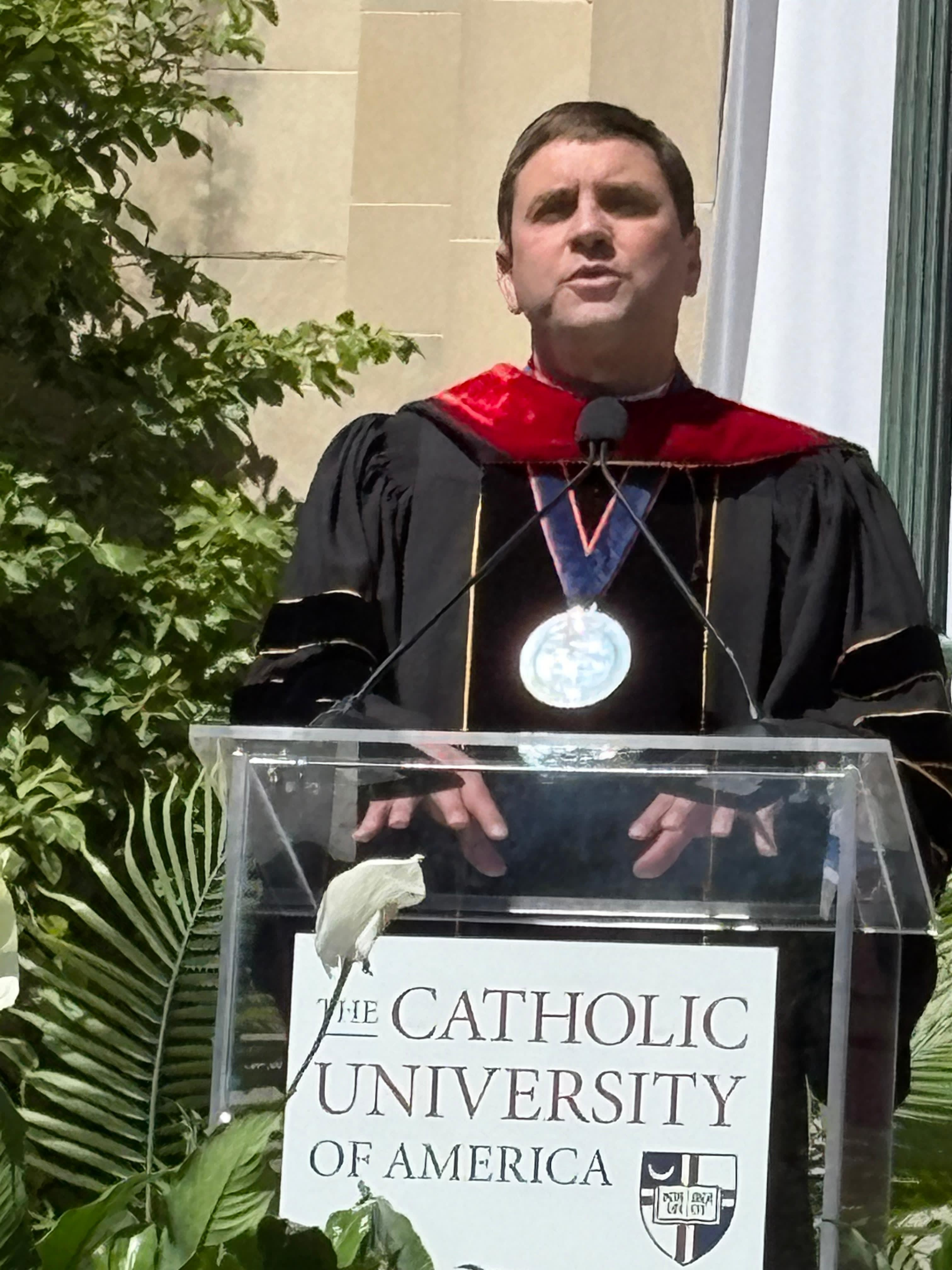
- Msgr. James Shea, President of the University of Mary, delivering the 2026 commencement address at The Catholic University of America
- Church: Catholic
- Diocese: Diocese of Bismarck

Orders
- Ordination: July 3, 2002 by Paul Albert Zipfel

Personal details
- Born: March 27, 1975 (age 51) Hazelton, North Dakota, U.S.
- Profession: President, University of Mary
- Education: Catholic University of America; Pontifical North American College; Pontifical Lateran University; Pontifical Gregorian University

James Patrick Shea (born March 27, 1975) is an American Catholic priest of the Diocese of Bismarck who has served as the president of the University of Mary since 2009.

== Early life and education ==
James Shea was born on March 27, 1975, to Joseph and Patricia Shea. He and his seven younger siblings all grew up on their parents' farm outside of Hazelton, North Dakota. He graduated from Hazelton-Moffit-Braddock High School in 1993 and then studied history and English at Jamestown College (now the University of Jamestown) for two years before entering seminary in 1995 and transferring to the Catholic University of America. He earned a bachelor's degree in philosophy with honors in 1997 as well as a pontifical licentiate (Ph.L.) through the Basselin Scholars program at Catholic University the following year. During this time he also taught religion in two inner-city elementary schools and worked at a hospice run by the Missionaries of Charity. He then was sent to the Pontifical North American College in Rome and studied theology at both the Pontifical Gregorian University and the Pontifical Lateran University. While studying in Rome he was a chaplain at the Bambino Gesù Hospital as well as for the Rome campus of the Center for Catholic Studies of the University of St. Thomas. On July 3, 2002, Bishop Paul Zipfel of Bismarck ordained Shea to the priesthood for the Diocese of Bismarck at the Cathedral of the Holy Spirit. The celebration following for Shea in his hometown of Hazelton was so large that his first Mass was said in his high school gymnasium, with more than 1600 attending.

== Priesthood ==
Shea's first assignment as a priest was as parochial vicar at the Cathedral of the Holy Spirit as well as teaching religion at St. Mary's Central High School. While teaching at St. Mary's, Shea taught a seminar-style class to seniors at the school titled “The Catholic Disciple.” Student participants in the course, which included topics such as the spiritual authenticity of Johnny Cash, Catholic themes in Brideshead Revisited, and the involvement of Catholics in the Solidarity movement in Poland, stated that it deepened their understanding of Catholicism and allowed faith to take clearer shape. During this time, Shea also said Mass in Spanish for the Latino community in Bismarck at the cathedral. Shea then served at Christ the King church in Mandan, North Dakota before becoming pastor of St. Joseph Church in Killdeer and St. Paul Church in Halliday. Shortly after this appointment, he received an e-mail invitation to meet with Pope Benedict XVI at the White House. Believing it was an April Fools' Day prank and spam, he deleted the email, putting it in “the same place I put all the emails with special offers for Viagra” and thinking nothing of it until he was contacted regarding the meeting a second time.

=== President of the University of Mary ===
In December 2008, the University of Mary announced that Shea would succeed Sister Thomas Welder as the sixth president of the Bismarck university. Welder, who had been president of the institution since 1978, stepped down due to health issues. This appointment made Shea, then 33 (34 at the time of his inauguration on September 19, 2009), the youngest college or university president in the United States. Shea oversaw the addition of the university's Rome study-abroad campus in 2010 and the inauguration of an interdisciplinary Catholic Studies program. In 2012, he announced a public-private partnership between the University of Mary and Arizona State University to bring University of Mary courses to Arizona, as the state had no Catholic colleges or universities. That same year, Benedict XVI named him a Chaplain of His Holiness with the title of "Monsignor."

Shea has spoken at Catholic conferences and other events, including the national SEEK conferences of the Fellowship of Catholic University Students (FOCUS), the 10th National Eucharistic Congress, and the National Catholic Prayer Breakfast in 2025. He serves on the board of directors of Saint John Vianney Seminary in Denver, the Northern Sun Intercollegiate Conference of the NCAA, and has served as chairman of the Catholic Identity Committee for the Board of Directors of FOCUS as well as on the National Advisory Council to the United States Conference of Catholic Bishops. For the State of North Dakota, he has served on the Governor’s Commission on Education Improvement and the Attorney General’s Task Force on Human Trafficking. He is also a Knight Commander of the Order of the Holy Sepulchre, a knighthood of the Holy See.

In 2022, the Becket Fund for Religious Liberty awarded the Canterbury Medal to Shea at a gala event in Miami, Florida, for his defense of medical conscience rights. In 2026, the Catholic University of America, his alma mater, conferred on him an honorary doctorate in theology and hosted him as the speaker for commencement. The university entitled his address, “Endurance vanquishes mediocrity.”
