= ADMAR =

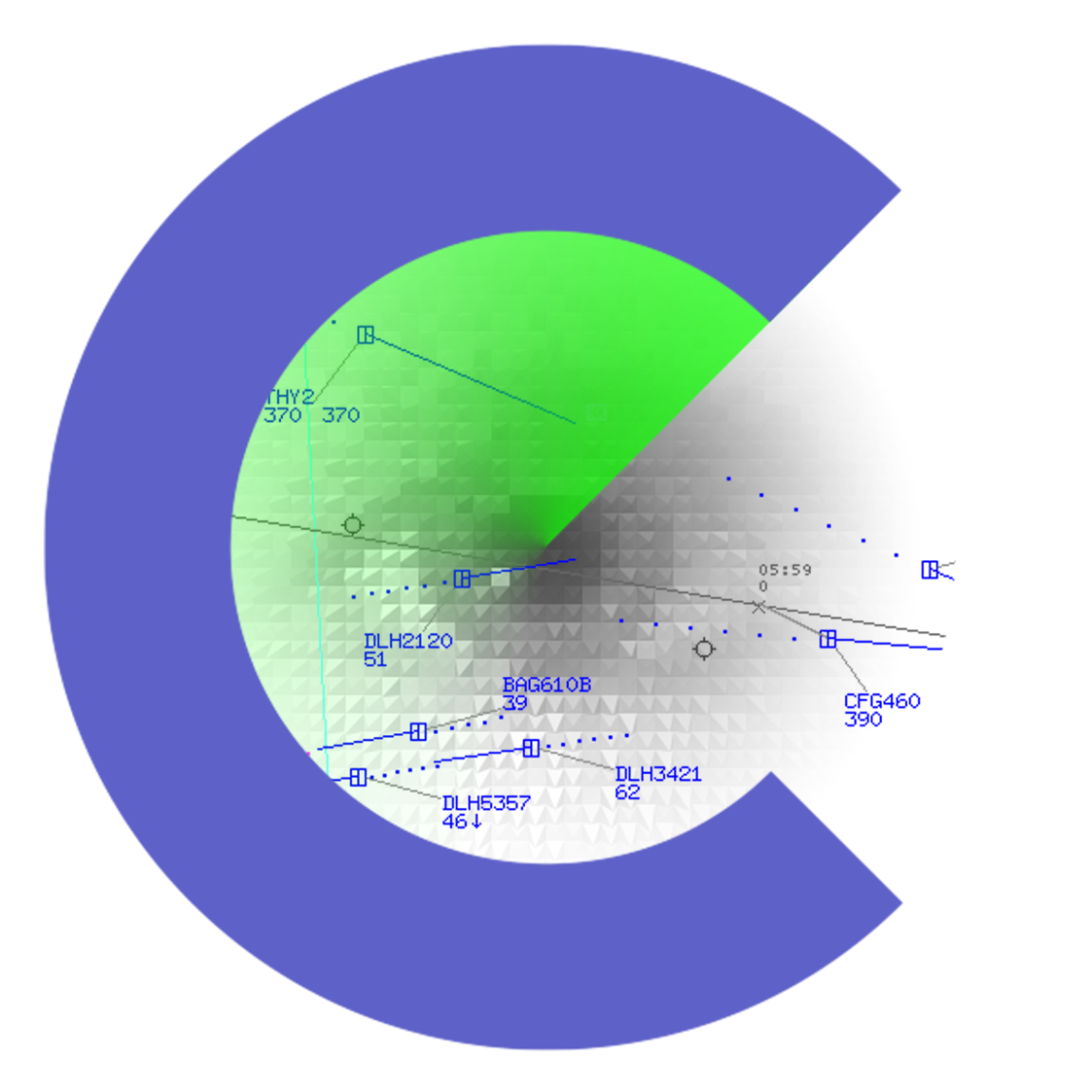
EUROCONTROL - ADMAR
- Introduction: 1983
- Users: Germany
- Successor system: CIMACT

ADMAR, an initialism for the German title Abgesetzte Darstellung von MADAP Radar data, was the predecessor product of CIMACT.

== Definition ==
The EUROCONTROL software product ADMAR did combine and merge several civilian surveillance- and military sensor data sources with Flight plan data sources. After data correlation it was able to provide a Recognised Air Picture (RAP). It could be operated on COTS hardware or special IT.

== History ==
ADMAR was developed on the basis of ADKAR and GAME footing on the special Agreement of MOD Germany (BMVg – A/13/D/HG/82, April 18, 1983) in cooperation with EUROCONTROL. It has been operational since 1983 and was used by the German Air Force exclusively. Since 2003 it became of interest for other European countries, NATO and security related authorities and organisations as well. ADMAR 2000 was the final software release.

Remark:

- MADAP – Maastricht Automatic Data Processing system
- ADKAR – Abgesetzte Darstellung von KARLDAP Radar-Daten
- KARLDAP – Karlsruhe Automatic Data Processing system
- GAME – GEADGE / ADKAR Message Exchange
- GEADGE – German Air Defence Ground Environment

== Utilisation ==
In Germany the utilisation of ADMAR was as follows:

- Stationary Control and Reporting Centre (CRC), TACCS
- Operation Centre National Air Defence (de: Nationales Lage- und Führungszentrum für Sicherheit im Luftraum - NLFZ SiLuRa)
- General Air Force Office (de: Luftwaffenamt)
- de:Multinational Aircrew Electronic Warfare Tactics Facility Polygone / en:Polygone Co-ordination Centre (PCC)
- Bundeswehr Air Traffic Service Office (de: Amt für Flugsicherung der Bundeswehr - AFSBw)
- JG 71 and JG 74

== See also ==
- CIMACT - European Civil-Military Air Traffic Management Co-ordination Tool
