= RCAF Station Grostenquin =

Coordinates: 49.02607°N 6.71449°E

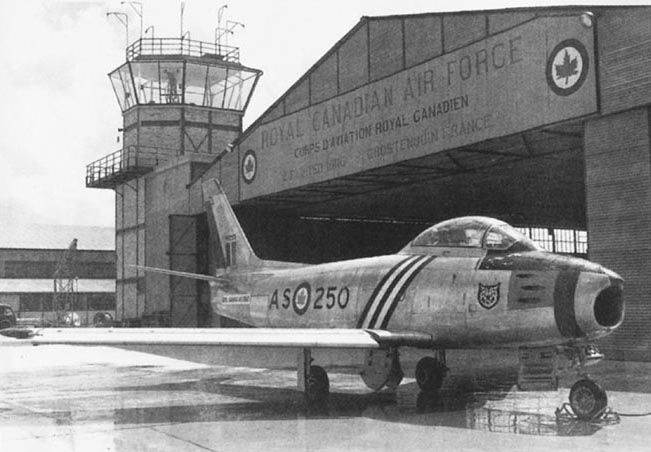
- Sabre Mk 5 of No. 416 Squadron at Grostenquin, 1953
- IATA: none; ICAO: none

Summary
- Airport type: Military training facility (Polygone)
- Owner: Government of Canada 1952–1964; Government of France (1964–present)
- Operator: RCAF (1952–1964); French Air Force (1979–present)
- Location: Grostenquin, France
- Interactive map of RCAF Station Grostenquin

Runways
Direction	Length		Surface
Direction	ft	m	Surface
15/33		2,830	asphalt/concrete

RCAF Station Grostenquin, also known as 2 (Fighter) Wing or 2 Wing, was a Royal Canadian Air Force (RCAF) station located five km north of the town of Grostenquin in the Moselle department, Lorraine, northeastern France. It was one of four RCAF wings, consisting of three fighter squadrons each, established in Europe in the early 1950s at the beginning of the Cold War. The other three wings were located at RCAF Station Marville (1 Wing) in France, and RCAF Station Zweibrücken (3 Wing) and RCAF Station Baden-Soellingen (4 Wing) in the former West Germany.

These wings were components of the RCAF's No. 1 Air Division, part of the Fourth Allied Tactical Air Force (4 ATAF). They functioned as Canada's western European air defence commitment to the North Atlantic Treaty Organization (NATO).

== History ==
=== 1952–1964 ===
No. 2 Wing's three squadrons flew from Canada between September 28 and October 11, 1952 during Operation Leapfrog II. They were the first of the Canadian Air Division squadrons to arrive in mainland Europe, and the first RCAF squadrons to be based on the European mainland since March 1946.

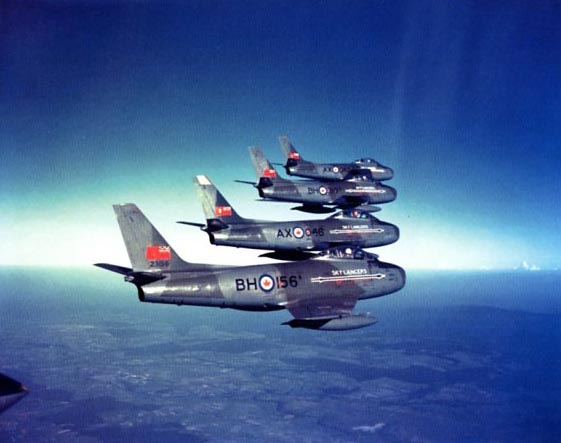
RCAF Sky Lancers aerobatic team, 1955

All twelve Air Division squadrons flew the Canadair Sabre day fighter. The squadrons originally based at Grostenquin were 416, 421 and 430. Beginning in 1956 four all-weather CF-100 squadrons entered service with Air Division. One squadron in each wing was replaced by a CF-100 squadron. No. 416 Squadron was replaced by 423 Squadron at 2 Wing. In 1959 Canada adopted a controversial nuclear strike role in accordance with NATO's doctrine of "limited nuclear warfare" and began re-equipping with the new CF-104 Starfighter that could deliver nuclear weapons. This aircraft also had a reconnaissance role. In the fall of 1962 the Sabre squadrons of the Air Division, including 421 and 430 Squadrons at 2 Wing, were re-equipped with the Starfighter. Concurrently, CF-100s ceased operation in the Air Division and 423 Squadron was disbanded.

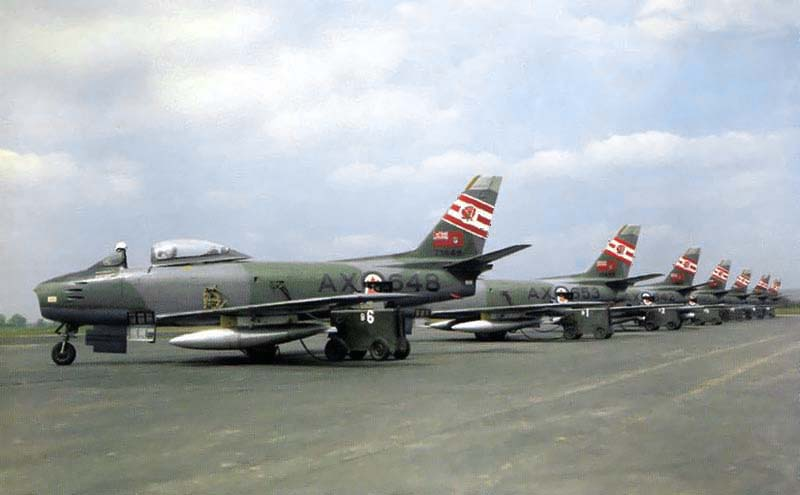
Sabres of No. 421 Squadron at Grostenquin, 1957

Pilots from all three Sabre squadrons at 2 Wing flew with 2 Wing's aerobatic team, the Sky Lancers. The team was formed in March 1955 and performed throughout Europe until October 1955. The following year the team was based at 4 Wing.

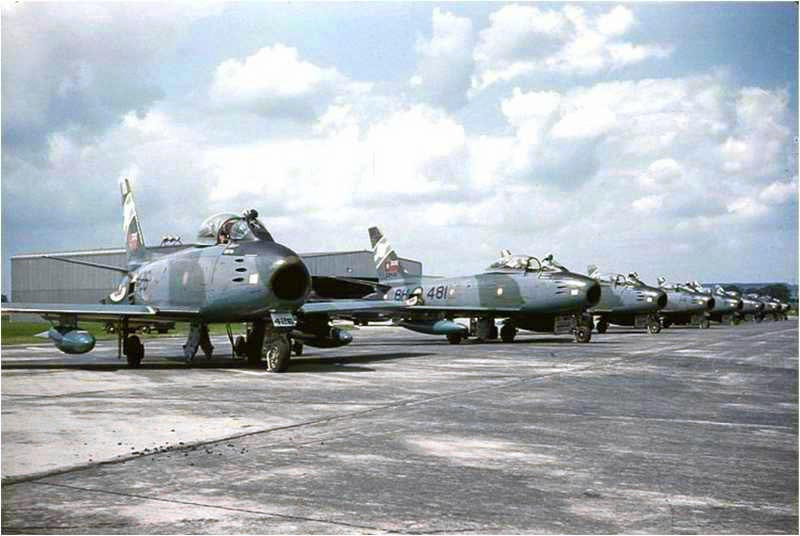
No. 430 Squadron Sabres, 1960

Other units located at Grostenquin include 601 Telecommunications Squadron and 109 Communications Flight. Logistics support for 2 Wing, as well as the other three wings, was provided by No. 30 Air Materiel Base (AMB) in Langar, U.K.

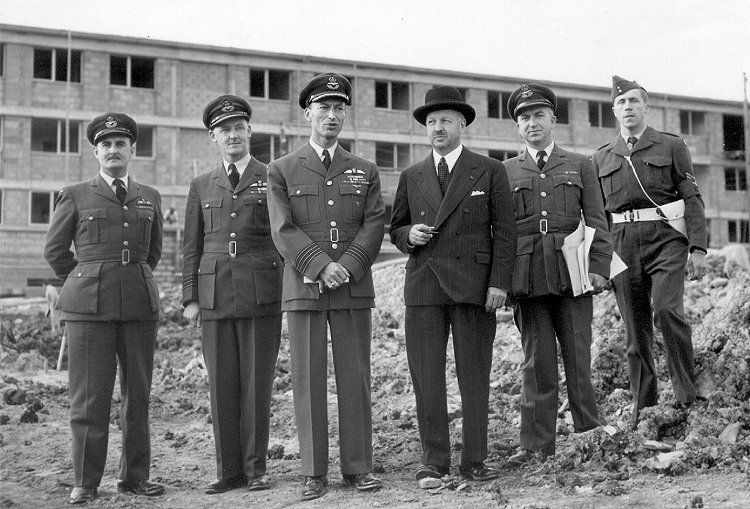
Married quarters under construction in Saint Avold

Families of service personnel were mainly accommodated in married quarters or PMQs consisting of 443 apartments at nearby Saint Avold. Other families were accommodated in private homes in local villages or in trailers on the base. Some personnel resided in single quarters on the station. Schools were located at Saint Avold and on the station. Recreational facilities on the base included an arena and pool. A grocery and general store, as well as a hospital were also located on the station.

NATO bases in France, including Grostenquin, were short-lived. In 1963 the Government of France announced that all nuclear weapons in France were to be placed under French control. This was unacceptable to the Canadian Government (and to other NATO governments with forces stationed in France), so the two nuclear strike squadrons of 2 Wing (421 and 430 Squadrons) were hastily relocated; 430 Squadron moved to 3 Wing Zweibrücken and 421 Squadron moved to 4 Wing Baden-Soellingen. RCAF Station Grostenquin closed in 1964.

=== Post-RCAF ===
After 1964 the airfield was transferred to the French Armed Forces, but abandoned until 1979 when it was re-used as an electronic warfare training range (Polygone) by the French Air Force, the Aviation légère de l’armée de Terre (French Army Aviation), Luftwaffe and USAF. Other than the hangars most of the RCAF logistics facilities are gone. The runway, taxiways and tarmac remain visible from aerial photos (as late as 2010) but markings have changed since the RCAF left in 1964.

== See also ==
- Ouvrage Kerfent – a former Maginot Line fortification used as a communications relay station by the RCAF in support of Grostenquin
- Metz–Nancy–Lorraine Airport - a functioning public airport located 40 kilometres (25 mi) west of Grostenquin
- History of the Royal Canadian Air Force
