= CIMACT =

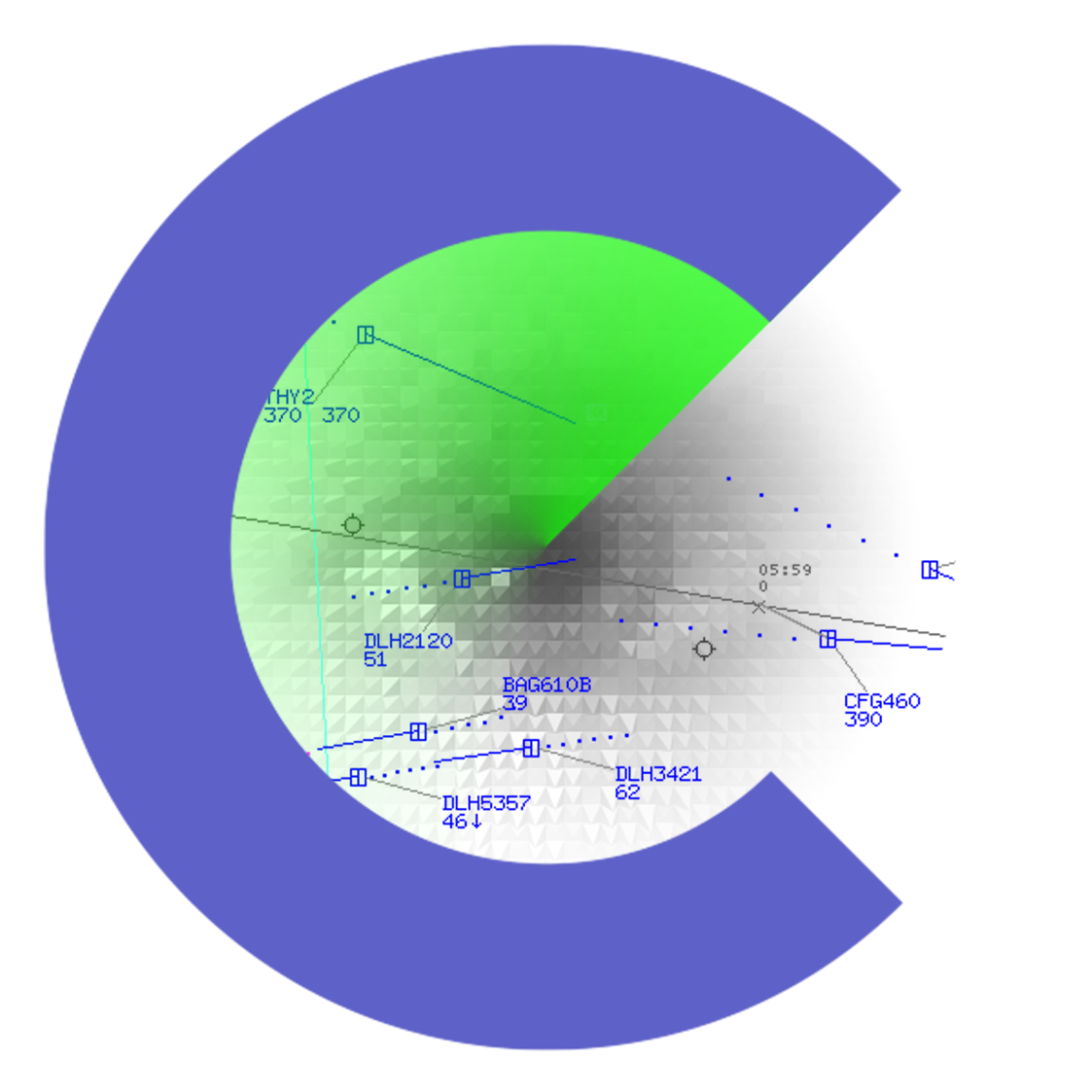
EUROCONTROL - CIMACT
- Introduction: 2002
- Users: France, Germany, Moldova, Portugal, Bulgaria, Serbia and the Netherlands. In addition, Poland, Norway, Turkey, and Ukraine as part of the Regional Airspace Security Programme (RASP)
- Requested: Bosnia and Herzegovina

CIMACT is EUROCONTROL's Civil-Military Air Traffic Management Co-ordination Tool.

== Definition ==
CIMACT is a EUROCONTROL software, that is combining and merging civil and military data sources (mainly surveillance and flight plan data) into a correlated Air Situation Display (also known as Recognised Air Picture (RAP) to enhance situational awareness and civil-military coordination. The aim is to ensure and increase safety levels, enhance capacity and efficiency. The software is highly flexible, interfaces to a wide variety of data sources and runs on commercial-off-the-shelf (COTS) hardware.

== History ==
CIMACT was developed on the basis of ADMAR 2000 (Abgesetzte Darstellung Maastricht Radar Daten), ADMAR, ADKAR and GAME on the basis of a special Agreement of MOD Germany (BMVg – A/13/D/HG/82, April 18, 1983) in cooperation with EUROCONTROL. It has been operational since 1983 and was used by the German Air Force exclusively. In 2002 the system was re-engineered to run on modern hardware and operating systems, and eventually named CIMACT. EUROCONTROL has since then offered the software package to its member states. CIMACT's flexibility and versatility have led to increased use by European countries and NATO for civil-military coordination, air traffic control and security-related applications.

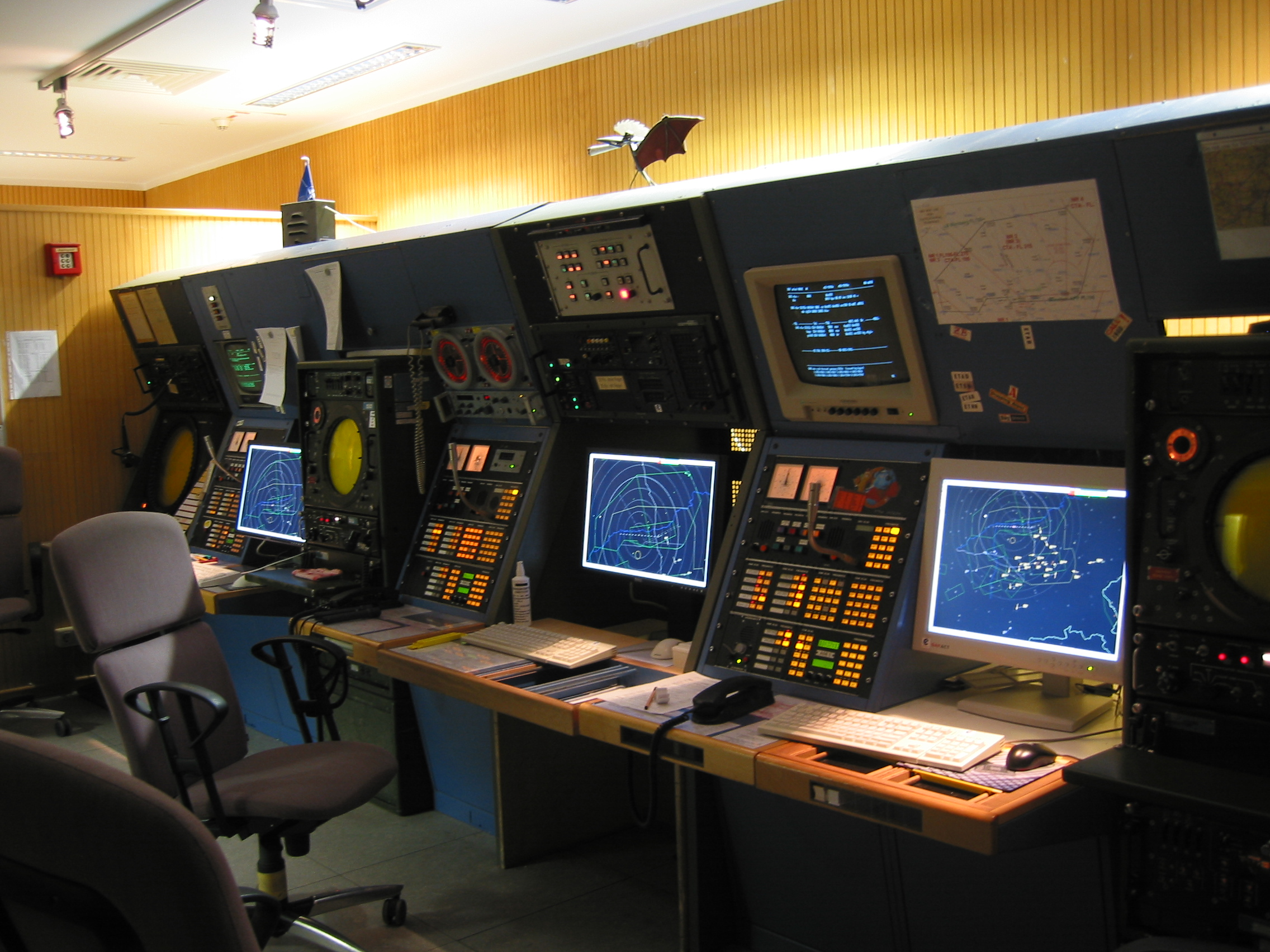
CIMACT in approach control

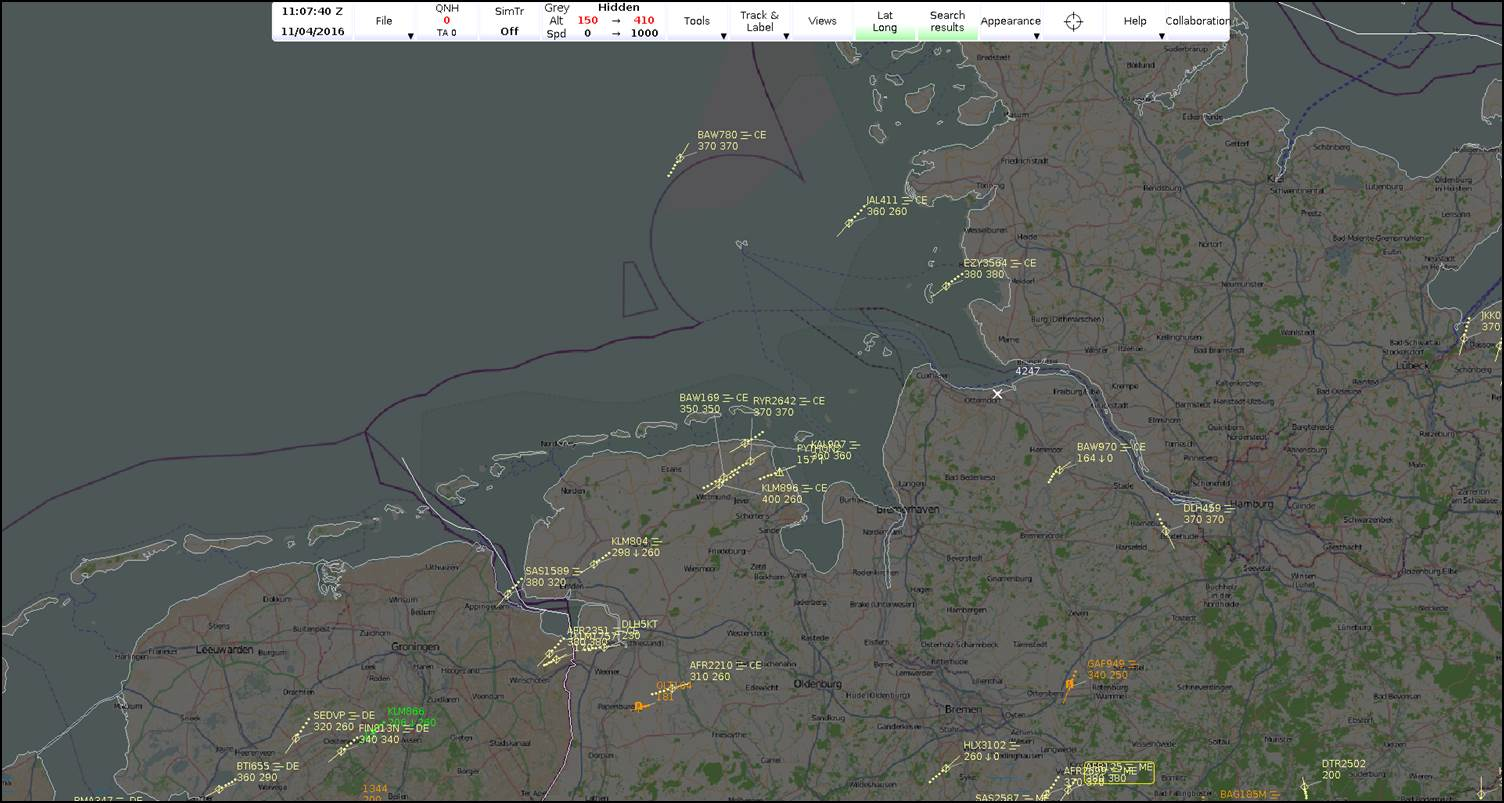
CIMACT HMI

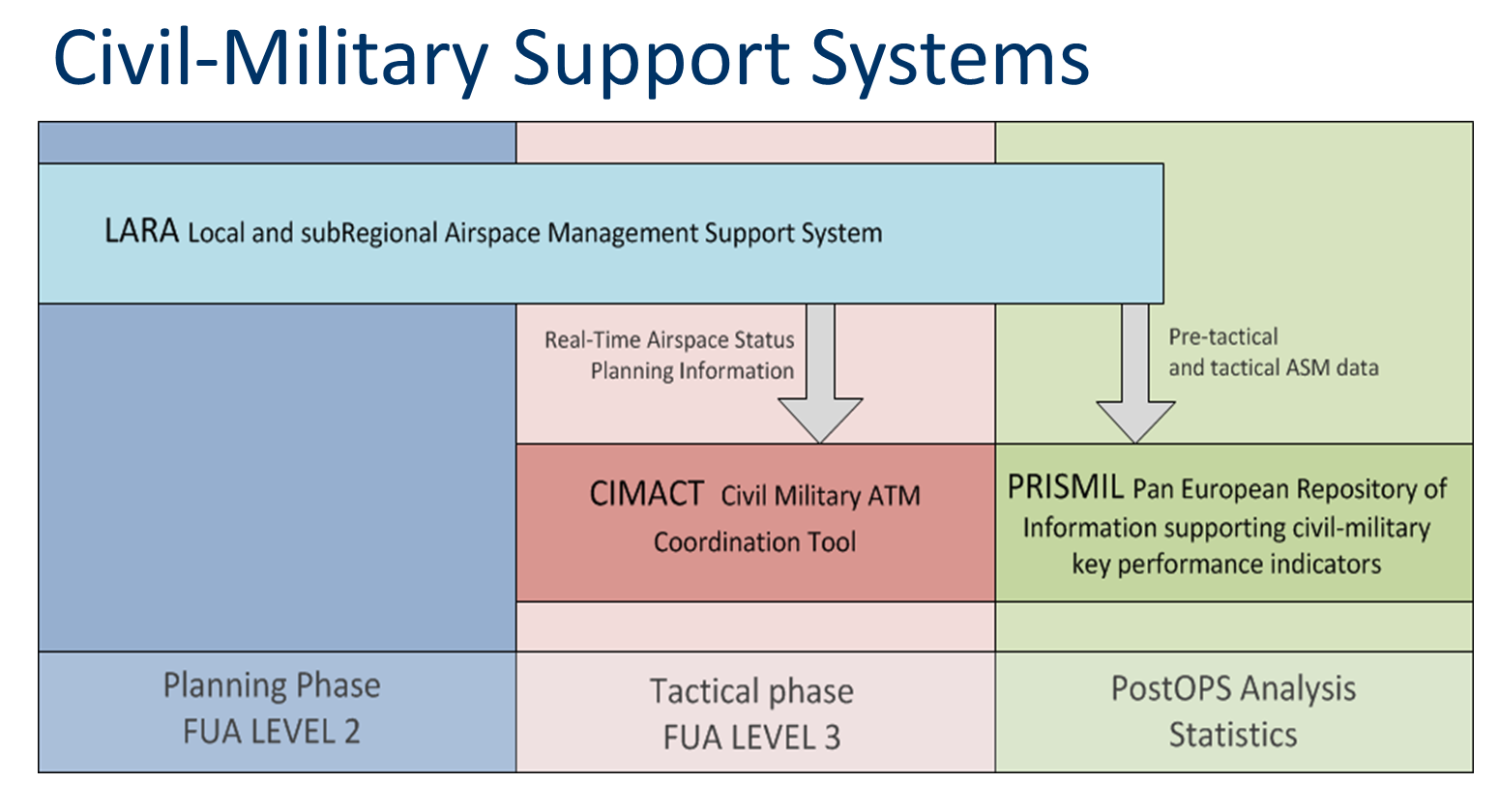
CIMACT in the flexible use of airspace concept

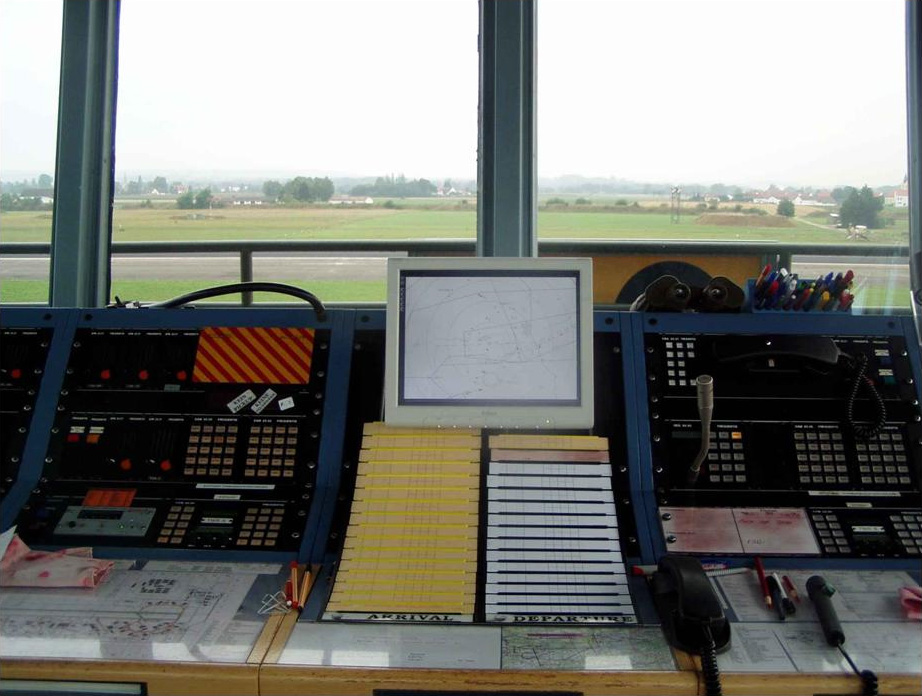
CIMACT on an aerodrome control tower

EUROCONTROL

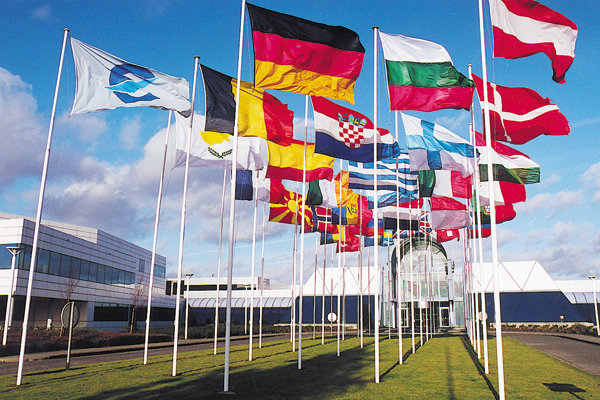
EUROCONTROL HQ in Brussels

== Operational use ==
CIMACT is developed as a common co-ordination system to exchange information between civil and military users. CIMACT integrates a wide variety of information to provide the user with a comprehensive overview of the air situation. It contains a set of air traffic control (ATC) functionalities, filters and collaboration facilities to enable silent coordination between connected systems. CIMACT offers an automated interface with the EUROCONTROL Local And sub-Regional Air space management support system (LARA).

CIMACT is used the following operational scenarios:

- Airspace management (FUA concept) – to improve situational awareness and enable coordination of civil and military controllers during the activation and use of areas designated for military training activities or operations.
- Aerodrome and approach control – Combined with a radar tracker, the system is used at different military airbases for control of local air traffic.
- Tracking, Recording and Analysis – to monitor and assess air traffic to follow up reports, investigate incidents and potential violations.
- ATM Security – to coordinate efficiently between civil and military units during ATM Security incidents, for more information, see the video on the EUROCONTROL CIMACT Site.

For additional information, see the latest CIMACT Brochure from EUROCONTROL.

== Main features ==
CIMACT is running on a dedicated Linux distribution and is coded in C++ and Java.

The main capabilities encompass:

- Decoding of multiple types of surveillance (tracks/plots) and flight plan data
- Producing one correlated air picture
- Connectivity over various networks and protocols (TCP/IP, UDP, X.25, UMTS, etc.)
- Filtering and highlighting capabilities
- Interfacing to several tools and databases (LARA, and EAD)
- Drawing package
- Pilot working position

CIMACT supported data formats

EUROCONTROL published ASTERIX standards:

- CAT000 Time Synchronisation Messages (timestamp and/or status)
- CAT001 Monoradar Data Target Reports (Plot and/or Track)
- CAT002 Monoradar Service Messages (Timestamp)
- CAT003 Distribution of Synthetic Air Traffic Data (Track)
- CAT004 Safety Nets Messages (Time and/or Conflict)
- CAT008 Monoradar Derived Weather Information (Weather)
- CAT009 Multisensor Derived Weather Information (Weather)
- CAT021 ADS-B Messages (Track)
- CAT030 Air Situation Picture (Track)
- CAT031 Sensor Service Messages (Status)
- CAT034 Monoradar Service Messages (Timestamp)
- CAT048 Monoradar Data Target Reports (Plot and/or Track)
- CAT062 System Track Data (Track)
- CAT063 Sensor Status Messages (Status)
- CAT065 SDPS Service Status Messages (Timestamp)
- CAT150 Flight Data Messages (Flight plan)
- CAT152 Time Stamp Messages (Timestamp)
- CAT252 Session and service control messages (Timestamp)

CIMACT developed ASTERIX standards (proprietary standards):

- CAT142 Track Highlight Messages
- CAT143 Geographical Pointer Messages
- CAT144 Note for Inter-site Communication Messages
- CAT145 List of Online Participants for Inter-site Communication Messages

ADEXP formatted messages:

- ADMFPL Flight Plan Message
- ADMFPT Flight Plan Termination Message
- ADMFPU Flight plan Update Message
- LARAACT Airspace Activation Message

ICAO formatted messages:

- FPL Filed Flight Plan
- CHG Changed Flight Plan
- CNL Cancelled Flight Plan
- CPL Current Flight Plan

== Programme management ==
The CIMACT Programme is managed by EUROCONTROL's Civil-Military ATM Coordination Division. Helpdesk and Service Support is provided by the CIMACT Team based at EUROCONTROL's Maastricht Upper Area Control Centre.

CIMACT is maintained and further developed in line with user requirements articulated through the CIMACT User Group. The software development and maintenance is currently contracted to 42Solutions b.v and Graffica Ltd.

The Intellectual Property Rights (IPR) for the software are owned by EUROCONTROL.

== Summary ==
CIMACT paves the way towards the European-wide application of the FUA concept with new opportunities for improving civil-military cooperation. CIMACT is a reliable cost-effective operational system supporting the improvement of civil-military co-ordination and security, which enhances the safety of air navigation in the Single European Sky.
