= Grostenquin =

- Commune
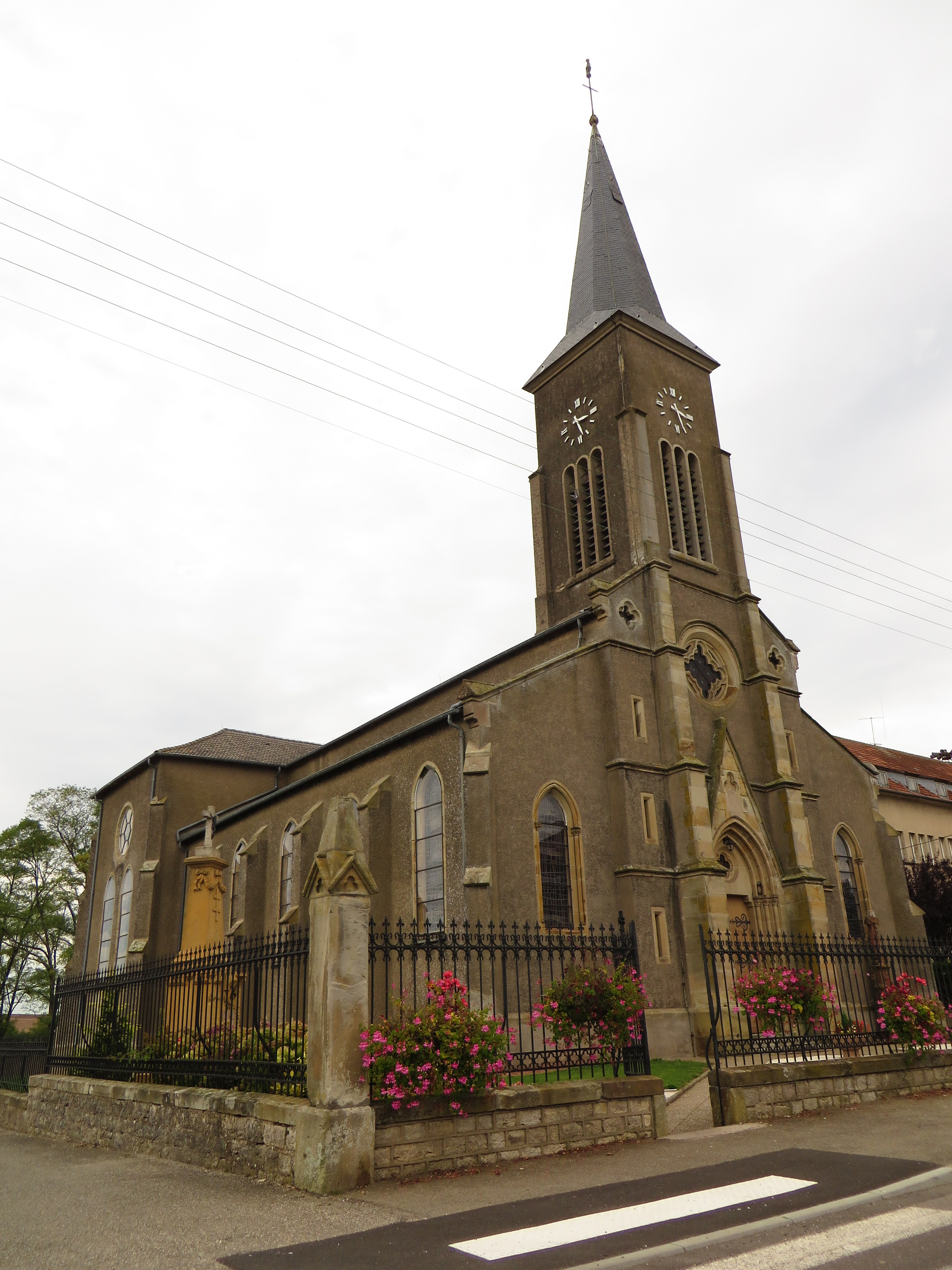
- A church in Grostenquin

- Coat of arms
- Location of Grostenquin
- Location within France Location within Grand Est
- Coordinates: 48°58′50″N 6°44′23″E
- Country: France
- Region: Grand Est
- Department: Moselle
- Arrondissement: Forbach-Boulay-Moselle
- Canton: Sarralbe
- Intercommunality: CA Saint-Avold Synergie

Government
  - Mayor (2020–2026): Patrick Seichepine
- Area^{1}: 21.77 km^{2} (8.41 sq mi)
- Elevation: 250 m (820 ft)
- Highest elevation: 306 m (1,004 ft)
- Lowest elevation: 226 m (741 ft)
- Population (2023): 604
  - Density: 27.7/km^{2} (71.9/sq mi)
- Time zone: UTC+01:00 (CET)
  - Summer (DST): UTC+02:00 (CEST)
- INSEE/Postal code: 57262 /57660
- ^{1} French Land Register data, which excludes lakes, ponds, glaciers > 1 km^{2} (0.386 sq mi or 247 acres) and river estuaries.

Grostenquin (French pronunciation: [ɡʁotɑ̃kɛ̃]; German: Großtänchen; Lorraine Franconian: Tännchen/Grosstänsche) is a commune in the Moselle department in Grand Est in north-eastern France, situated between Metz and Strasbourg.

Localities of the commune: Béning, Bertring, Hingsange, Linstroff.

== History ==
Its population in 2022 was 620 people.

A Royal Canadian Air Force (RCAF) base, RCAF Station Grostenquin, was located here from 1952–1964. After the departure of the RCAF, the airport was closed by the French. The facilities are still used by the French Armed Forces for military exercises.

== Notable people ==
- NHL player and coach Paul MacLean was born here.
- Theodore B. Basselin (1851–1914), lumber magnate, was born here.

== See also ==
- Communes of the Moselle department
