= List of United States representatives in the 69th Congress =

This is a complete list of United States representatives during the 69th United States Congress listed by seniority.

As an historical article, the districts and party affiliations listed reflect those during the 69th Congress (March 4, 1925 – March 3, 1927). Seats and party affiliations on similar lists for other congresses will be different for certain members.

Seniority depends on the date on which members were sworn into office. Since many members are sworn in on the same day, subsequent ranking is based on previous congressional service of the individual and then by alphabetical order by the last name of the representative.

Committee chairmanship in the House is often associated with seniority. However, party leadership is typically not associated with seniority.

Note: The "*" indicates that the representative/delegate may have served one or more non-consecutive terms while in the House of Representatives of the United States Congress.

== U.S. House seniority list ==
U.S. House seniority
Rank	Representative	Party	District	Seniority date (Previous service, if any)	No.# of term(s)	Notes
1	Thomas S. Butler	R	PA-08	March 4, 1897	15th term	Dean of the House
2	Gilbert N. Haugen	R	IA-04	March 4, 1899	14th term	
3	Edward W. Pou	D	NC-04	March 4, 1901	13th term	
4	John Nance Garner	D	TX-15	March 4, 1903	12th term	
5	Thomas Montgomery Bell	D	GA-09	March 4, 1905	11th term	
6	Finis J. Garrett	D	TN-09	March 4, 1905	11th term	
7	Gordon Lee	D	GA-07	March 4, 1905	11th term	Left the House in 1927.
8	Martin B. Madden	R	IL-01	March 4, 1905	11th term	
9	Willis C. Hawley	R	OR-01	March 4, 1907	10th term	
10	Ben Johnson	D	KY-04	March 4, 1907	10th term	Left the House in 1927.
11	John W. Langley	R	KY-10	March 4, 1907	10th term	Resigned on January 11, 1926.
12	James C. McLaughlin	R	MI-09	March 4, 1907	10th term	
13	Adolph J. Sabath	D	IL-05	March 4, 1907	10th term	
14	Daniel Read Anthony Jr.	R	KS-01	May 23, 1907	10th term	
15	Charles D. Carter	D	OK-03	November 16, 1907	10th term	Left the House in 1927.
16	Joseph W. Byrns Sr.	D	TN-06	March 4, 1909	9th term	
17	James W. Collier	D	MS-08	March 4, 1909	9th term	
18	William Walton Griest	R	PA-10	March 4, 1909	9th term	
19	William Allan Oldfield	D	AR-02	March 4, 1909	9th term	
20	Edward T. Taylor	D	CO-04	March 4, 1909	9th term	
21	Robert Y. Thomas Jr.	D	KY-03	March 4, 1909	9th term	Died on September 3, 1925.
22	Robert L. Doughton	D	NC-08	March 4, 1911	8th term	
23	John Charles Linthicum	D	MD-04	March 4, 1911	8th term	
24	Stephen G. Porter	R	PA-32	March 4, 1911	8th term	
25	John E. Raker	D	CA-02	March 4, 1911	8th term	Died on January 22, 1926.
26	Arthur B. Rouse	D	KY-06	March 4, 1911	8th term	Left the House in 1927.
27	Charles M. Stedman	D	NC-05	March 4, 1911	8th term	
28	William R. Green	R	IA-09	June 5, 1911	8th term	
29	Carl Hayden	D	AZ	February 19, 1912	8th term	Left the House in 1927.
30	William Scott Vare	R	PA-01	May 24, 1912	8th term	Left the House in 1927.
31	James Benjamin Aswell	D	LA-08	March 4, 1913	7th term	
32	Alben W. Barkley	D	KY-01	March 4, 1913	7th term	Left the House in 1927.
33	Frederick A. Britten	R	IL-09	March 4, 1913	7th term	
34	Edward E. Browne	R	WI-08	March 4, 1913	7th term	
35	John F. Carew	D	NY-18	March 4, 1913	7th term	
36	Louis C. Cramton	R	MI-07	March 4, 1913	7th term	
37	Charles R. Crisp	D	GA-03	March 4, 1913; Previous service, 1896–1897.	8th term*	
38	Charles F. Curry	R	CA-03	March 4, 1913	7th term	
39	James A. Frear	R	WI-10	March 4, 1913	7th term	
40	George Scott Graham	R	PA-02	March 4, 1913	7th term	
41	Albert Johnson	R	WA-03	March 4, 1913	7th term	
42	Edgar Raymond Kiess	R	PA-16	March 4, 1913	7th term	
43	Ladislas Lazaro	D	LA-07	March 4, 1913	7th term	
44	Carl E. Mapes	R	MI-05	March 4, 1913	7th term	
45	Andrew Jackson Montague	D	VA-03	March 4, 1913	7th term	
46	John M. Morin	R	PA-34	March 4, 1913	7th term	
47	James S. Parker	R	NY-29	March 4, 1913	7th term	
48	Percy Quin	D	MS-07	March 4, 1913	7th term	
49	Sam Rayburn	D	TX-04	March 4, 1913	7th term	
50	John Jacob Rogers	R	MA-05	March 4, 1913	7th term	Died on March 28, 1925.
51	Nicholas J. Sinnott	R	OR-02	March 4, 1913	7th term	
52	Addison T. Smith	R	ID-02	March 4, 1913	7th term	
53	Hatton W. Sumners	D	TX-05	March 4, 1913	7th term	
54	Allen T. Treadway	R	MA-01	March 4, 1913	7th term	
55	Otis Wingo	D	AR-04	March 4, 1913	7th term	
56	James P. Buchanan	D	TX-10	April 15, 1913	7th term	
57	James A. Gallivan	D	MA-12	April 3, 1914	7th term	
58	Carl Vinson	D	GA-10	November 3, 1914	7th term	
59	Edward B. Almon	D	AL-08	March 4, 1915	6th term	
60	Isaac Bacharach	R	NJ-02	March 4, 1915	6th term	
61	Eugene Black	D	TX-01	March 4, 1915	6th term	
62	John G. Cooper	R	OH-19	March 4, 1915	6th term	
63	George P. Darrow	R	PA-07	March 4, 1915	6th term	
64	S. Wallace Dempsey	R	NY-40	March 4, 1915	6th term	
65	Edward E. Denison	R	IL-25	March 4, 1915	6th term	
66	Cassius C. Dowell	R	IA-07	March 4, 1915	6th term	
67	Leonidas C. Dyer	R	MO-12	March 4, 1915; Previous service, 1911–1914.	8th term*	
68	Richard P. Freeman	R	CT-02	March 4, 1915	6th term	
69	Charles Eugene Fuller	R	IL-12	March 4, 1915; Previous service, 1903–1913.	11th term*	Died on June 25, 1926.
70	Lindley H. Hadley	R	WA-02	March 4, 1915	6th term	
71	George Huddleston	D	AL-09	March 4, 1915	6th term	
72	W. Frank James	R	MI-12	March 4, 1915	6th term	
73	Royal C. Johnson	R	SD-02	March 4, 1915	6th term	
74	Charles Cyrus Kearns	R	OH-06	March 4, 1915	6th term	
75	David Hayes Kincheloe	D	KY-02	March 4, 1915	6th term	
76	Edward John King	R	IL-15	March 4, 1915	6th term	
77	Frederick R. Lehlbach	R	NJ-10	March 4, 1915	6th term	
78	Nicholas Longworth	R	OH-01	March 4, 1915; Previous service, 1903–1913.	11th term*	Speaker of the House
79	Walter W. Magee	R	NY-35	March 4, 1915	6th term	
80	Whitmell P. Martin	D	LA-03	March 4, 1915	6th term	
81	James V. McClintic	D	OK-07	March 4, 1915	6th term	
82	Louis Thomas McFadden	R	PA-15	March 4, 1915	6th term	
83	William Bacon Oliver	D	AL-06	March 4, 1915	6th term	
84	Christian William Ramseyer	R	IA-06	March 4, 1915	6th term	
85	Frank D. Scott	R	MI-11	March 4, 1915	6th term	Left the House in 1927.
86	William J. Sears	D	FL-04	March 4, 1915	6th term	
87	Henry B. Steagall	D	AL-03	March 4, 1915	6th term	
88	John N. Tillman	D	AR-03	March 4, 1915	6th term	
89	John Q. Tilson	R	CT-03	March 4, 1915; Previous service, 1909–1913.	8th term*	
90	Charles B. Timberlake	R	CO-02	March 4, 1915	6th term	
91	George H. Tinkham	R	MA-11	March 4, 1915	6th term	
92	Edward Hills Wason	R	NH-02	March 4, 1915	6th term	
93	Henry Winfield Watson	R	PA-09	March 4, 1915	6th term	
94	Thomas Sutler Williams	R	IL-24	March 4, 1915	6th term	
95	Riley J. Wilson	D	LA-05	March 4, 1915	6th term	
96	William R. Wood	R	IN-10	March 4, 1915	6th term	
97	Bertrand Snell	R	NY-31	November 2, 1915	6th term	
98	Henry Wilson Temple	R	PA-25	November 2, 1915; Previous service, 1913–1915.	7th term*	
99	William B. Bankhead	D	AL-10	March 4, 1917	5th term	
100	Thomas L. Blanton	D	TX-17	March 4, 1917	5th term	
101	Charles Hillyer Brand	D	GA-08	March 4, 1917	5th term	
102	Guy Edgar Campbell	R	PA-36	March 4, 1917	5th term	
103	Tom Connally	D	TX-11	March 4, 1917	5th term	
104	Frederick H. Dominick	D	SC-03	March 4, 1917	5th term	
105	Herbert J. Drane	D	FL-01	March 4, 1917	5th term	
106	Hubert Fisher	D	TN-10	March 4, 1917	5th term	
107	Burton L. French	R	ID-01	March 4, 1917; Previous service, 1903–1909 and 1911–1915.	10th term**	
108	Ira G. Hersey	R	ME-04	March 4, 1917	5th term	
109	John Marvin Jones	D	TX-18	March 4, 1917	5th term	
110	Melville Clyde Kelly	R	PA-33	March 4, 1917; Previous service, 1913–1915.	6th term*	
111	Harold Knutson	R	MN-06	March 4, 1917	5th term	
112	William Washington Larsen	D	GA-12	March 4, 1917	5th term	
113	Clarence F. Lea	D	CA-01	March 4, 1917	5th term	
114	Joseph J. Mansfield	D	TX-09	March 4, 1917	5th term	
115	John Franklin Miller	R	WA-01	March 4, 1917	5th term	
116	Fred S. Purnell	R	IN-09	March 4, 1917	5th term	
117	Archie D. Sanders	R	NY-39	March 4, 1917	5th term	
118	William Francis Stevenson	D	SC-05	March 4, 1917	5th term	
119	Nathan Leroy Strong	R	PA-27	March 4, 1917	5th term	
120	Christopher D. Sullivan	D	NY-13	March 4, 1917	5th term	
121	Albert Henry Vestal	R	IN-08	March 4, 1917	5th term	
122	Edward Voigt	R	WI-02	March 4, 1917	5th term	Left the House in 1927.
123	Wallace H. White Jr.	R	ME-02	March 4, 1917	5th term	
124	Frederick Nicholas Zihlman	R	MD-06	March 4, 1917	5th term	
125	Richard N. Elliott	R	IN-06	June 29, 1917	5th term	
126	Schuyler Merritt	R	CT-04	November 6, 1917	5th term	
127	William C. Wright	D	GA-04	January 16, 1918	5th term	
128	Anthony J. Griffin	D	NY-22	March 5, 1918	5th term	
129	S. Otis Bland	D	VA-01	July 2, 1918	5th term	
130	Florian Lampert	R	WI-06	November 5, 1918	5th term	
131	Ernest Robinson Ackerman	R	NJ-05	March 4, 1919	4th term	
132	Henry E. Barbour	R	CA-07	March 4, 1919	4th term	
133	James T. Begg	R	OH-13	March 4, 1919	4th term	
134	William D. Boies	R	IA-11	March 4, 1919	4th term	
135	John C. Box	D	TX-02	March 4, 1919	4th term	
136	Clay Stone Briggs	D	TX-07	March 4, 1919	4th term	
137	Clark Burdick	R	RI-01	March 4, 1919	4th term	
138	Carl Richard Chindblom	R	IL-10	March 4, 1919	4th term	
139	Charles A. Christopherson	R	SD-01	March 4, 1919	4th term	
140	Frank Crowther	R	NY-30	March 4, 1919	4th term	
141	Thomas H. Cullen	D	NY-04	March 4, 1919	4th term	
142	Ewin Lamar Davis	D	TN-05	March 4, 1919	4th term	
143	Lester J. Dickinson	R	IA-10	March 4, 1919	4th term	
144	Guy U. Hardy	R	CO-03	March 4, 1919	4th term	
145	Andrew J. Hickey	R	IN-13	March 4, 1919	4th term	
146	Homer Hoch	R	KS-04	March 4, 1919	4th term	
147	Claude Benton Hudspeth	D	TX-16	March 4, 1919	4th term	
148	Samuel Austin Kendall	R	PA-24	March 4, 1919	4th term	
149	William Chester Lankford	D	GA-11	March 4, 1919	4th term	
150	Robert Luce	R	MA-13	March 4, 1919	4th term	
151	Clarence MacGregor	R	NY-41	March 4, 1919	4th term	
152	James M. Mead	D	NY-42	March 4, 1919	4th term	
153	John McDuffie	D	AL-01	March 4, 1919	4th term	
154	Melvin O. McLaughlin	R	NE-04	March 4, 1919	4th term	Left the House in 1927.
155	Earl C. Michener	R	MI-02	March 4, 1919	4th term	
156	C. Ellis Moore	R	OH-15	March 4, 1919	4th term	
157	B. Frank Murphy	R	OH-18	March 4, 1919	4th term	
158	Cleveland A. Newton	R	MO-10	March 4, 1919	4th term	Left the House in 1927.
159	Walter Newton	R	MN-05	March 4, 1919	4th term	
160	Daniel A. Reed	R	NY-43	March 4, 1919	4th term	
161	John M. Robsion	R	KY-11	March 4, 1919	4th term	
162	Milton William Shreve	R	PA-29	March 4, 1919; Previous service, 1913–1915.	5th term*	
163	James H. Sinclair	R	ND-03	March 4, 1919	4th term	
164	John H. Smithwick	D	FL-03	March 4, 1919	4th term	Left the House in 1927.
165	Ambrose E. B. Stephens	R	OH-02	March 4, 1919	4th term	Died on February 12, 1927.
166	James G. Strong	R	KS-05	March 4, 1919	4th term	
167	John W. Summers	R	WA-04	March 4, 1919	4th term	
168	J. Will Taylor	R	TN-02	March 4, 1919	4th term	
169	Charles J. Thompson	R	OH-05	March 4, 1919	4th term	
170	Jasper N. Tincher	R	KS-07	March 4, 1919	4th term	Left the House in 1927.
171	William David Upshaw	D	GA-05	March 4, 1919	4th term	Left the House in 1927.
172	William N. Vaile	R	CO-01	March 4, 1919	4th term	
173	Zebulon Weaver	D	NC-10	March 4, 1919; Previous service, 1917–1919.	5th term*	
174	Hays B. White	R	KS-06	March 4, 1919	4th term	
175	Richard Yates Jr.	R	IL	March 4, 1919	4th term	
176	Fritz G. Lanham	D	TX-12	April 19, 1919	4th term	
177	R. Walton Moore	D	VA-08	April 27, 1919	4th term	
178	James O'Connor	D	LA-01	June 5, 1919	4th term	
179	Oscar Keller	R	MN-04	July 1, 1919	4th term	Left the House in 1927.
180	Patrick H. Drewry	D	VA-04	April 27, 1920	4th term	
181	Hamilton Fish Jr.	R	NY-26	November 2, 1920	4th term	
182	Francis F. Patterson Jr.	R	NJ-01	November 2, 1920	4th term	Left the House in 1927.
183	Nathan D. Perlman	R	NY-14	November 2, 1920	4th term	Left the House in 1927.
184	Harry C. Ransley	R	PA-03	November 2, 1920	4th term	
185	William B. Bowling	D	AL-05	December 14, 1920	4th term	
186	Joseph D. Beck	R	WI-07	March 4, 1921	3rd term	
187	Carroll L. Beedy	R	ME-01	March 4, 1921	3rd term	
188	Harris Jacob Bixler	R	PA-28	March 4, 1921	3rd term	Left the House in 1927.
189	Alfred L. Bulwinkle	D	NC-09	March 4, 1921	3rd term	
190	Olger B. Burtness	R	ND-01	March 4, 1921	3rd term	
191	Theodore E. Burton	R	OH-22	March 4, 1921; Previous service, 1889–1891 and 1895–1909.	11th term**	
192	Frank Clague	R	MN-02	March 4, 1921	3rd term	
193	Ross A. Collins	D	MS-05	March 4, 1921	3rd term	
194	Don B. Colton	R	UT-01	March 4, 1921	3rd term	
195	James J. Connolly	R	PA-05	March 4, 1921	3rd term	
196	Henry Allen Cooper	R	WI-01	March 4, 1921; Previous service, 1893–1919.	16th term*	
197	Joseph T. Deal	D	VA-02	March 4, 1921	3rd term	
198	William J. Driver	D	AR-01	March 4, 1921	3rd term	
199	Charles L. Faust	R	MO-04	March 4, 1921	3rd term	
200	E. Hart Fenn	R	CT-01	March 4, 1921	3rd term	
201	Roy G. Fitzgerald	R	OH-03	March 4, 1921	3rd term	
202	Arthur M. Free	R	CA-08	March 4, 1921	3rd term	
203	Louis A. Frothingham	R	MA-14	March 4, 1921	3rd term	
204	Hampton P. Fulmer	D	SC-07	March 4, 1921	3rd term	
205	Frank H. Funk	R	IL-17	March 4, 1921	3rd term	Left the House in 1927.
206	Daniel E. Garrett	D	TX-08	March 4, 1921; Previous service, 1913–1915 and 1917–1919.	5th term**	
207	Ralph Waldo Emerson Gilbert	D	KY-08	March 4, 1921	3rd term	
208	Thomas Alan Goldsborough	D	MD-01	March 4, 1921	3rd term	
209	William C. Hammer	D	NC-07	March 4, 1921	3rd term	
210	Harry B. Hawes	D	MO-11	March 4, 1921	3rd term	Resigned on October 15, 1926.
211	John Boynton Philip Clayton Hill	R	MD-03	March 4, 1921	3rd term	Left the House in 1927.
212	John C. Ketcham	R	MI-04	March 4, 1921	3rd term	
213	John J. Kindred	D	NY-02	March 4, 1921; Previous service, 1911–1913.	4th term*	
214	William F. Kopp	R	IA-01	March 4, 1921	3rd term	
215	Stanley H. Kunz	D	IL-08	March 4, 1921	3rd term	
216	Elmer O. Leatherwood	R	UT-02	March 4, 1921	3rd term	
217	Bill G. Lowrey	D	MS-02	March 4, 1921	3rd term	
218	Homer L. Lyon	D	NC-06	March 4, 1921	3rd term	
219	John J. McSwain	D	SC-04	March 4, 1921	3rd term	
220	M. Alfred Michaelson	R	IL-07	March 4, 1921	3rd term	
221	Ogden L. Mills	R	NY-17	March 4, 1921	3rd term	Left the House in 1927.
222	William M. Morgan	R	OH-17	March 4, 1921	3rd term	
223	John M. Nelson	R	WI-03	March 4, 1921; Previous service, 1906–1919.	10th term*	
224	Tilman B. Parks	D	AR-07	March 4, 1921	3rd term	
225	Randolph Perkins	R	NJ-06	March 4, 1921	3rd term	
226	John E. Rankin	D	MS-01	March 4, 1921	3rd term	
227	B. Carroll Reece	R	TN-01	March 4, 1921	3rd term	
228	Morgan G. Sanders	D	TX-03	March 4, 1921	3rd term	
229	John N. Sandlin	D	LA-04	March 4, 1921	3rd term	
230	John C. Speaks	R	OH-12	March 4, 1921	3rd term	
231	Elliott W. Sproul	R	IL-03	March 4, 1921	3rd term	
232	Fletcher B. Swank	D	OK-05	March 4, 1921	3rd term	
233	Phil Swing	R	CA-11	March 4, 1921	3rd term	
234	Charles L. Underhill	R	MA-09	March 4, 1921	3rd term	
235	William Williamson	R	SD-03	March 4, 1921	3rd term	
236	Roy O. Woodruff	R	MI-10	March 4, 1921; Previous service, 1913–1915.	4th term*	
237	Harry M. Wurzbach	R	TX-14	March 4, 1921	3rd term	
238	Adam Martin Wyant	R	PA-31	March 4, 1921	3rd term	
239	Walter F. Lineberger	R	CA-09	April 11, 1921	3rd term	Left the House in 1927.
240	Lamar Jeffers	D	AL-04	June 7, 1921	3rd term	
241	Cyrenus Cole	R	IA-05	August 1, 1921	3rd term	
242	A. Piatt Andrew	R	MA-06	September 27, 1921	3rd term	
243	John E. Nelson	R	ME-03	March 20, 1922	3rd term	
244	Henry St. George Tucker	D	VA-10	March 21, 1922; Previous service, 1889–1897.	7th term*	
245	Guinn Williams	D	TX-13	May 22, 1922	3rd term	
246	Charles Laban Abernethy	D	NC-03	November 7, 1922	3rd term	
247	Charles L. Gifford	R	MA-16	November 7, 1922	3rd term	
248	Richard S. Aldrich	R	RI-02	March 4, 1923	2nd term	
249	Miles C. Allgood	D	AL-07	March 4, 1923	2nd term	
250	William W. Arnold	D	IL-23	March 4, 1923	2nd term	
251	William Augustus Ayres	D	KS-08	March 4, 1923; Previous service, 1915–1921.	5th term*	
252	Robert L. Bacon	R	NY-01	March 4, 1923	2nd term	
253	Edward M. Beers	R	PA-18	March 4, 1923	2nd term	
254	Victor L. Berger	R	WI-05	March 4, 1923; Previous service, 1911–1913 and 1919.	4th term**	
255	Loring Milton Black Jr.	D	NY-05	March 4, 1923	2nd term	
256	Sol Bloom	D	NY-19	March 4, 1923	2nd term	
257	John J. Boylan	D	NY-15	March 4, 1923	2nd term	
258	Charles Brand	R	OH-07	March 4, 1923	2nd term	
259	Gordon Browning	D	TN-08	March 4, 1923	2nd term	
260	George F. Brumm	R	PA-13	March 4, 1923	2nd term	Left the House in 1927.
261	T. Jeff Busby	D	MS-04	March 4, 1923	2nd term	
262	Harry C. Canfield	D	IN-04	March 4, 1923	2nd term	
263	Clarence Cannon	D	MO-09	March 4, 1923	2nd term	
264	Emanuel Celler	D	NY-10	March 4, 1923	2nd term	
265	William E. Cleary	D	NY-08	March 4, 1923; Previous service, 1918–1921.	4th term*	Left the House in 1927.
266	William P. Connery Jr.	D	MA-07	March 4, 1923	2nd term	
267	Parker Corning	D	NY-28	March 4, 1923	2nd term	
268	Robert Crosser	D	OH-21	March 4, 1923; Previous service, 1913–1919.	5th term*	
269	Martin L. Davey	D	OH-14	March 4, 1923; Previous service, 1918–1921.	4th term*	
270	Clement C. Dickinson	D	MO-06	March 4, 1923; Previous service, 1910–1921.	8th term*	
271	Samuel Dickstein	D	NY-12	March 4, 1923	2nd term	
272	John M. Evans	D	MT-01	March 4, 1923; Previous service, 1913–1921.	6th term*	
273	Milton C. Garber	R	OK-08	March 4, 1923	2nd term	
274	Allard H. Gasque	D	SC-06	March 4, 1923	2nd term	
275	Frank Gardner	D	IN-03	March 4, 1923	2nd term	
276	Arthur H. Greenwood	D	IN-02	March 4, 1923	2nd term	
277	Thomas W. Harrison	D	VA-07	March 4, 1923; Previous service, 1916–1922.	6th term*	
278	William Wirt Hastings	D	OK-02	March 4, 1923; Previous service, 1915–1921.	5th term*	
279	William P. Holaday	R	IL-18	March 4, 1923	2nd term	
280	Edgar Howard	D	NE-03	March 4, 1923	2nd term	
281	Grant M. Hudson	R	MI-06	March 4, 1923	2nd term	
282	Cordell Hull	D	TN-04	March 4, 1923; Previous service, 1907–1921.	9th term*	
283	William E. Hull	R	IL-16	March 4, 1923	2nd term	
284	Meyer Jacobstein	D	NY-38	March 4, 1923	2nd term	
285	Luther Alexander Johnson	D	TX-06	March 4, 1923	2nd term	
286	Jacob Banks Kurtz	R	PA-21	March 4, 1923	2nd term	
287	Ole J. Kvale	R	MN-07	March 4, 1923	2nd term	
288	Fiorello H. La Guardia	ALP	NY-20	March 4, 1923; Previous service, 1917–1919.	4th term*	
289	Scott Leavitt	R	MT-02	March 4, 1923	2nd term	
290	George W. Lindsay	D	NY-03	March 4, 1923	2nd term	
291	Ralph F. Lozier	D	MO-02	March 4, 1923	2nd term	
292	James McDevitt Magee	R	PA-35	March 4, 1923	2nd term	Left the House in 1927.
293	Samuel C. Major	D	MO-07	March 4, 1923; Previous service, 1919–1921.	3rd term*	
294	Joe J. Manlove	R	MO-15	March 4, 1923	2nd term	
295	Tom D. McKeown	D	OK-04	March 4, 1923; Previous service, 1917–1921.	4th term*	
296	Clarence J. McLeod	R	MI-13	March 4, 1923; Previous service, 1920–1921.	3rd term*	
297	Samuel Davis McReynolds	D	TN-03	March 4, 1923	2nd term	
298	John McSweeney	D	OH-16	March 4, 1923	2nd term	
299	Jacob L. Milligan	D	MO-03	March 4, 1923; Previous service, 1920–1921.	3rd term*	
300	Charles A. Mooney	D	OH-20	March 4, 1923; Previous service, 1919–1921.	3rd term*	
301	John H. Morehead	D	NE-01	March 4, 1923	2nd term	
302	John Morrow	D	NM	March 4, 1923	2nd term	
303	David J. O'Connell	D	NY-09	March 4, 1923; Previous service, 1919–1921.	3rd term*	
304	Jeremiah E. O'Connell	D	RI-03	March 4, 1923	2nd term	Left the House in 1927.
305	Frank A. Oliver	D	NY-23	March 4, 1923	2nd term	
306	Hubert H. Peavey	R	WI-11	March 4, 1923	2nd term	
307	George C. Peery	D	VA-09	March 4, 1923	2nd term	
308	Thomas Wharton Phillips Jr.	R	PA-26	March 4, 1923	2nd term	Left the House in 1927.
309	John Quayle	D	NY-07	March 4, 1923	2nd term	
310	Heartsill Ragon	D	AR-05	March 4, 1923	2nd term	
311	Henry Thomas Rainey	D	IL-20	March 4, 1923; Previous service, 1903–1921.	11th term*	
312	Henry Riggs Rathbone	R	IL	March 4, 1923	2nd term	
313	Frank R. Reid	R	IL-11	March 4, 1923	2nd term	
314	Thomas J. B. Robinson	R	IA-03	March 4, 1923	2nd term	
315	Milton A. Romjue	D	MO-01	March 4, 1923; Previous service, 1917–1921.	4th term*	
316	Thomas L. Rubey	D	MO-16	March 4, 1923; Previous service, 1911–1921.	7th term*	
317	John C. Schafer	R	WI-04	March 4, 1923	2nd term	
318	George J. Schneider	R	WI-09	March 4, 1923	2nd term	
319	Willis G. Sears	R	NE-02	March 4, 1923	2nd term	
320	George N. Seger	R	NJ-07	March 4, 1923	2nd term	
321	Ashton C. Shallenberger	D	NE-05	March 4, 1923; Previous service, 1901–1903 and 1915–1919.	5th term**	
322	Robert G. Simmons	R	NE-06	March 4, 1923	2nd term	
323	William H. Sproul	R	KS-03	March 4, 1923	2nd term	
324	Gale H. Stalker	R	NY-37	March 4, 1923	2nd term	
325	William Irvin Swoope	R	PA-23	March 4, 1923	2nd term	Left the House in 1927.
326	John Taber	R	NY-36	March 4, 1923	2nd term	
327	J. Alfred Taylor	D	WV-06	March 4, 1923	2nd term	Left the House in 1927.
328	Maurice Thatcher	R	KY-05	March 4, 1923	2nd term	
329	Elmer Thomas	D	OK-06	March 4, 1923	2nd term	Left the House in 1927.
330	Millard Tydings	D	MD-02	March 4, 1923	2nd term	Left the House in 1927.
331	Mell G. Underwood	D	OH-11	March 4, 1923	2nd term	
332	Bird J. Vincent	R	MI-08	March 4, 1923	2nd term	
333	J. Mayhew Wainwright	R	NY-25	March 4, 1923	2nd term	
334	Laurence Hawley Watres	R	PA-11	March 4, 1923	2nd term	
335	Knud Wefald	R	MN-09	March 4, 1923	2nd term	Left the House in 1927.
336	Royal Hurlburt Weller	D	NY-21	March 4, 1923	2nd term	
337	George Austin Welsh	R	PA-06	March 4, 1923	2nd term	
338	T. Webber Wilson	D	MS-06	March 4, 1923	2nd term	
339	Charles E. Winter	R	WY	March 4, 1923	2nd term	
340	Clifton A. Woodrum	D	VA-06	March 4, 1923	2nd term	
341	Morton D. Hull	R	IL-02	April 3, 1923	2nd term	
342	John D. Fredericks	R	CA-10	May 1, 1923	2nd term	Left the House in 1927.
343	Arthur B. Williams	R	MI-03	June 19, 1923	2nd term	Died on May 1, 1925.
344	J. Lister Hill	D	AL-02	August 14, 1923	2nd term	
345	Samuel B. Hill	D	WA-05	September 25, 1923	2nd term	
346	James B. Reed	D	AR-06	October 6, 1923	2nd term	
347	Thomas A. Doyle	D	IL-04	November 6, 1923	2nd term	
348	Benjamin L. Fairchild	R	NY-24	November 6, 1923; Previous service, 1895–1897, 1917–1919 and 1921–1923.	5th term***	Left the House in 1927.
349	Ernest Willard Gibson	R	VT-02	November 6, 1923	2nd term	
350	John H. Kerr	D	NC-02	November 6, 1923	2nd term	
351	Anning Smith Prall	D	NY-11	November 6, 1923	2nd term	
352	John J. O'Connor	D	NY-16	November 6, 1923	2nd term	
353	Thaddeus C. Sweet	R	NY-32	November 6, 1923	2nd term	
354	Fred M. Vinson	D	KY-09	January 24, 1924	2nd term	
355	James Z. Spearing	D	LA-02	April 22, 1924	2nd term	
356	Stephen Warfield Gambrill	D	MD-05	November 4, 1924	2nd term	
357	Thomas Hall	R	ND-02	November 4, 1924	2nd term	
358	Charles Adkins	R	IL-19	March 4, 1925	1st term	
359	John Clayton Allen	R	IL-14	March 4, 1925	1st term	
360	August H. Andresen	R	MN-03	March 4, 1925	1st term	
361	Samuel S. Arentz	R	NV	March 4, 1925; Previous service, 1921–1923.	2nd term*	
362	Oscar L. Auf der Heide	D	NJ-11	March 4, 1925	1st term	
363	Carl G. Bachmann	R	WV-01	March 4, 1925	1st term	
364	Ralph Emerson Bailey	R	MO-14	March 4, 1925	1st term	Left the House in 1927.
365	Frank Llewellyn Bowman	R	WV-02	March 4, 1925	1st term	
366	Elbert S. Brigham	R	VT-01	March 4, 1925	1st term	
367	Edmund Nelson Carpenter	R	PA-12	March 4, 1925	1st term	Left the House in 1927.
368	William Leighton Carss	FL	MN-08	March 4, 1925; Previous service, 1919–1921.	2nd term*	
369	Albert E. Carter	R	CA-06	March 4, 1925	1st term	
370	William W. Chalmers	R	OH-09	March 4, 1925; Previous service, 1921–1923.	2nd term*	
371	Virgil Chapman	D	KY-07	March 4, 1925	1st term	
372	George B. Churchill	R	MA-02	March 4, 1925	1st term	Died on July 1, 1925.
373	Edward E. Cox	D	GA-02	March 4, 1925	1st term	
374	William R. Coyle	R	PA-30	March 4, 1925	1st term	Left the House in 1927.
375	Maurice E. Crumpacker	R	OR-03	March 4, 1925	1st term	
376	Frederick M. Davenport	R	NY-33	March 4, 1925	1st term	
377	John J. Douglass	D	MA-10	March 4, 1925	1st term	
378	Charles Aubrey Eaton	R	NJ-04	March 4, 1925	1st term	
379	Charles Gordon Edwards	D	GA-01	March 4, 1925; Previous service, 1907–1917.	6th term*	
380	Edgar C. Ellis	R	MO-05	March 4, 1925; Previous service, 1905–1909 and 1921–1923.	4th term**	Left the House in 1927.
381	Edward Everett Eslick	D	TN-07	March 4, 1925	1st term	
382	Charles Joseph Esterly	R	PA-14	March 4, 1925	1st term	Left the House in 1927.
383	William T. Fitzgerald	R	OH-04	March 4, 1925	1st term	
384	Lawrence J. Flaherty	R	CA-05	March 4, 1925	1st term	Died on June 13, 1926.
385	Thomas B. Fletcher	D	OH-08	March 4, 1925	1st term	
386	Franklin William Fort	R	NJ-09	March 4, 1925	1st term	
387	Frank H. Foss	R	MA-03	March 4, 1925	1st term	
388	Allen J. Furlow	R	MN-01	March 4, 1925	1st term	
389	James P. Glynn	R	CT-05	March 4, 1925; Previous service, 1915–1923.	5th term*	
390	Benjamin M. Golder	R	PA-04	March 4, 1925	1st term	
391	John J. Gorman	R	IL-06	March 4, 1925; Previous service, 1921–1923.	2nd term*	Left the House in 1927.
392	Godfrey G. Goodwin	R	MN-10	March 4, 1925	1st term	
393	Robert A. Green	D	FL-02	March 4, 1925	1st term	
394	Fletcher Hale	R	NH-01	March 4, 1925	1st term	
395	Albert R. Hall	R	IN-11	March 4, 1925	1st term	
396	Butler B. Hare	D	SC-02	March 4, 1925	1st term	
397	David Hogg	R	IN-12	March 4, 1925	1st term	
398	Robert G. Houston	R	DE	March 4, 1925	1st term	
399	Edward M. Irwin	R	IL-22	March 4, 1925	1st term	
400	Thomas A. Jenkins	R	OH-10	March 4, 1925	1st term	
401	Noble J. Johnson	R	IN-05	March 4, 1925	1st term	
402	William Richard Johnson	R	IL-13	March 4, 1925	1st term	
403	Florence Prag Kahn	R	CA-04	March 4, 1925	1st term	
404	Bolivar E. Kemp	D	LA-06	March 4, 1925	1st term	
405	Charles Edward Kiefner	R	MO-13	March 4, 1925	1st term	Left the House in 1927.
406	F. Dickinson Letts	R	IA-02	March 4, 1925	1st term	
407	Chauncey B. Little	D	KS-02	March 4, 1925	1st term	Left the House in 1927.
408	Frederick William Magrady	R	PA-17	March 4, 1925	1st term	
409	Joseph William Martin Jr.	R	MA-15	March 4, 1925	1st term	
410	Thomas S. McMillan	D	SC-01	March 4, 1925	1st term	
411	Franklin Menges	R	PA-22	March 4, 1925	1st term	
412	Samuel J. Montgomery	R	OK-01	March 4, 1925	1st term	Left the House in 1927.
413	William L. Nelson	D	MO-08	March 4, 1925; Previous service, 1919–1921.	2nd term*	
414	Mary Teresa Norton	D	NJ-12	March 4, 1925	1st term	
415	Harcourt J. Pratt	R	NY-27	March 4, 1925	1st term	
416	Harry E. Rowbottom	R	IN-01	March 4, 1925	1st term	
417	Samuel Rutherford	D	GA-06	March 4, 1925	1st term	
418	Andrew Lawrence Somers	D	NY-06	March 4, 1925	1st term	
419	John B. Sosnowski	R	MI-01	March 4, 1925	1st term	Left the House in 1927.
420	George R. Stobbs	R	MA-04	March 4, 1925	1st term	
421	James F. Strother	R	WV-05	March 4, 1925	1st term	
422	Joshua William Swartz	R	PA-19	March 4, 1925	1st term	Left the House in 1927.
423	Herbert W. Taylor	R	NJ-08	March 4, 1925; Previous service, 1921–1923.	2nd term*	Left the House in 1927.
424	Harry Irving Thayer	R	MA-08	March 4, 1925	1st term	Died on March 10, 1926.
425	Lloyd Thurston	R	IA-08	March 4, 1925	1st term	
426	Harold S. Tolley	R	NY-34	March 4, 1925	1st term	Left the House in 1927.
427	Ralph E. Updike	R	IN-07	March 4, 1925	1st term	
428	Anderson Howell Walters	R	PA-20	March 4, 1925; Previous service, 1913–1915 and 1919–1923.	4th term**	Left the House in 1927.
429	Lindsay Carter Warren	D	NC-01	March 4, 1925	1st term	
430	Loren E. Wheeler	R	IL-21	March 4, 1925; Previous service, 1915–1923.	5th term*	Left the House in 1927.
431	Joseph Whitehead	D	VA-05	March 4, 1925	1st term	
432	William Madison Whittington	D	MS-03	March 4, 1925	1st term	
433	John M. Wolverton	R	WV-03	March 4, 1925	1st term	Left the House in 1927.
434	Harry C. Woodyard	R	WV-04	March 4, 1925; Previous service, 1903–1911 and 1916–1923.	9th term**	Left the House in 1927.
	Edith Nourse Rogers	R	MA-05	June 30, 1925	1st term	
	Joseph L. Hooper	R	MI-03	August 18, 1925	1st term	
	Henry L. Bowles	R	MA-02	September 29, 1925	1st term	
	Stewart H. Appleby	R	NJ-03	November 3, 1925	1st term	Left the House in 1927.
	John William Moore	D	KY-03	December 26, 1925	1st term	
	Andrew Jackson Kirk	R	KY-10	February 13, 1926	1st term	Left the House in 1927.
	Harry Lane Englebright	R	CA-02	August 31, 1926	1st term	
	Richard J. Welch	R	CA-05	August 31, 1926	1st term	
	John J. Cochran	D	MO-11	November 2, 1926	1st term	
	Frederick W. Dallinger	R	MA-08	November 2, 1926; Previous service, 1915–1925.	6th term*	

== Delegates ==
Rank	Delegate	Party	District	Seniority date (Previous service, if any)	No.# of term(s)	Notes
1	Félix Córdova Dávila		PR	August 7, 1917	5th term	
2	Isauro Gabaldon		PHL	March 4, 1920	4th term	
3	Daniel Sutherland	R	AK	March 4, 1921	3rd term	
4	Pedro Guevara	Nac	PHL	March 4, 1923	2nd term	
5	William Paul Jarrett	D	HI	March 4, 1923	2nd term	

== See also ==
- 69th United States Congress
- List of United States congressional districts
- List of United States senators in the 69th Congress
