= Halvor L. Halvorson =

American politician (1881–1951)

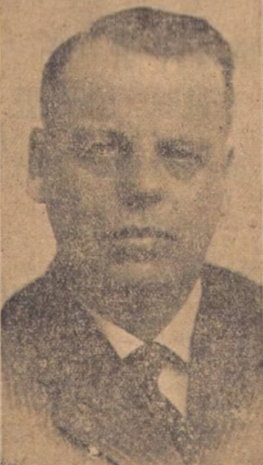

10th President of the Minot City Commission
- In office June 20, 1911 – 1915
- Preceded by: Arthur LeSueur
- Succeeded by: William S. Shaw

Personal details
- Born: Halvor Langdon Halvorson; July 15, 1881 Henning, Minnesota, U.S.
- Died: October 3, 1951 (aged 70) Minot, North Dakota, U.S.
- Party: Democratic
- Spouse: Nina Knudsen
- Children: 4
- Education: University of North Dakota

Halvor Langdon Halvorson (July 15, 1881 – October 3, 1951) was an American politician and attorney who served as the mayor of Minot, North Dakota and later became a perennial candidate in North Dakota's congressional elections.

== Early life ==
On August 15, 1881, Halvor Langdon Halvorson was born in Henning, Minnesota. In 1902, he graduated from the University of North Dakota with a law degree and in 1908, moved to Minot, North Dakota.

== Career ==
In 1910, he ran for state treasurer against incumbent Republican Gunder Olson and in September was named as vice chairman of the state Democratic party, but was defeated. Following the resignation of former Commission President Arthur LeSueur on May 17, 1911, a special election was held on June 6, in which Halvorson narrowly defeated Dorr H. Carroll and Peter Vandenoever with 232 votes against 196 and 94 votes. In 1912, 1914, and 1918, Halvorson ran for North Dakota's third House district, but lost each time with his best showing being 31.16%. He served as a delegate to the 1916 Democratic National Convention and gave his support to incumbent President Woodrow Wilson.

In 1916, Halvorson attempted to win the Democratic nomination for governor, but was defeated by D. H. McArthur who went on to lose in a landslide to Lynn Frazier. In 1924, he narrowly defeated L. S. Platon for the Democratic gubernatorial nomination with 6,020 votes to 5,244 votes and was narrowly defeated by Arthur G. Sorlie with 53.93% to 46.07% of the vote.

In 1932 and 1938, he attempted to win the Democratic nomination for Senator, but was defeated both times. In 1940, he won the Democratic nomination for attorney general and was narrowly defeated by incumbent Alvin C. Strutz with 52.19% to 47.81% of the vote. In 1942 and 1944, he ran for North Dakota's at-large congressional district, but was defeated both times although he was the best performing Democrat both times.

In 1949, he was one of the attorneys who advised the Turtle Mountain Band of Chippewa Indians in their $24,000,000 claim against the federal government. On October 3, 1951, he died in a Minot hospital after being there since June 26 due to pneumonia and a heart condition.

== Electoral history ==
Halvor L. Halvorson electoral history

1912 North Dakota Third Congressional District election
Party	Candidate	Votes	%
Republican	Patrick Daniel Norton	12,935	50.74%
Democratic	Halvor L. Halvorson	7,306	28.66%
Socialist	Arthur LeSueur	5,254	20.61%
Total votes		25,495	100.00%

1914 North Dakota Third Congressional District election
Party	Candidate	Votes	%	±%
Republican	Patrick Daniel Norton (incumbent)	15,547	57.05%	+6.31%
Democratic	Halvor L. Halvorson	7,394	27.13%	−1.53%
Socialist	S. Griffith	3,798	13.94%	−6.67%
Independent	H.R. Ringoen	512	1.88%	+1.88%
Total votes		27,251	100.00%	

1918 North Dakota Third Congressional District election
Party	Candidate	Votes	%	±%
Republican	James H. Sinclair	17,564	68.84%	+3.63%
Democratic	Halvor L. Halvorson	7,951	31.16%	+4.64%
Total votes		25,515	100.00%	

1924 North Dakota gubernatorial election
Party	Candidate	Votes	%	±%
Republican	Arthur G. Sorlie	101,170	53.93%	−3.72%
Democratic	Halvor L. Halvorson	86,414	46.07%	+46.07%
Total votes		187,584	100.00%	

1940 Attorney General election
Party	Candidate	Votes	%	±%
Republican	Alvin C. Strutz (incumbent)	128,074	52.19%	−0.71%
Democratic	Halvor L. Halvorson	117,337	47.81%	+0.71%
Total votes		245,411	100.00%	

1942 North Dakota At-large Congressional District election
Party	Candidate	Votes	%	±%
Republican	Usher L. Burdick (incumbent)	85,936	30.71%	−3.74%
Republican	William Lemke	65,905	23.55%	N/A
Independent Republican	Charles R. Robertson (incumbent)	48,472	17.32%	−8.51%
Democratic	Halvor L. Halvorson	47,972	17.14%	N/A
Democratic	E. A. Johansson	31,547	11.27%	N/A
Total votes		279,832	100.00%	

1944 North Dakota At-large Congressional District election
Party	Candidate	Votes	%	±%
Republican	William Lemke (incumbent)	101,007	29.73%	+6.18%
Republican	Charles R. Robertson	91,425	26.91%	+9.59%
Democratic	Halvor L. Halvorson	56,699	16.69%	−0.45%
Democratic	J.R. Kennedy	45,308	13.34%	N/A
Independent	Usher L. Burdick (incumbent)	39,888	11.74%	−18.97%
Independent	George McClellan	3,135	0.92%	N/A
Independent	Arthur C. Townley	2,307	0.68%	N/A
Total votes		339,769	100.00%	

Party political offices
Vacant Title last held by James Francis Thaddeus O'Connor	Democratic nominee for Governor of North Dakota; 1924	Succeeded by David M. Holmes
Preceded by William T. Depuy	Democratic nominee for North Dakota Attorney General; 1940	Succeeded by Walter O. Buck
