= 1916 United States presidential election in Indiana =

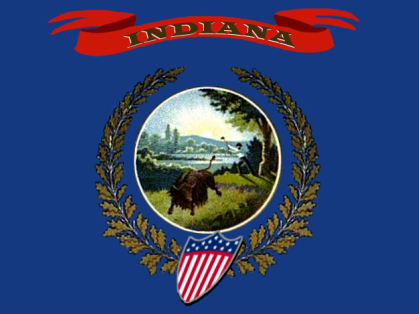
- November 7, 1916
- Turnout: 81.9% ▲4.1 pp
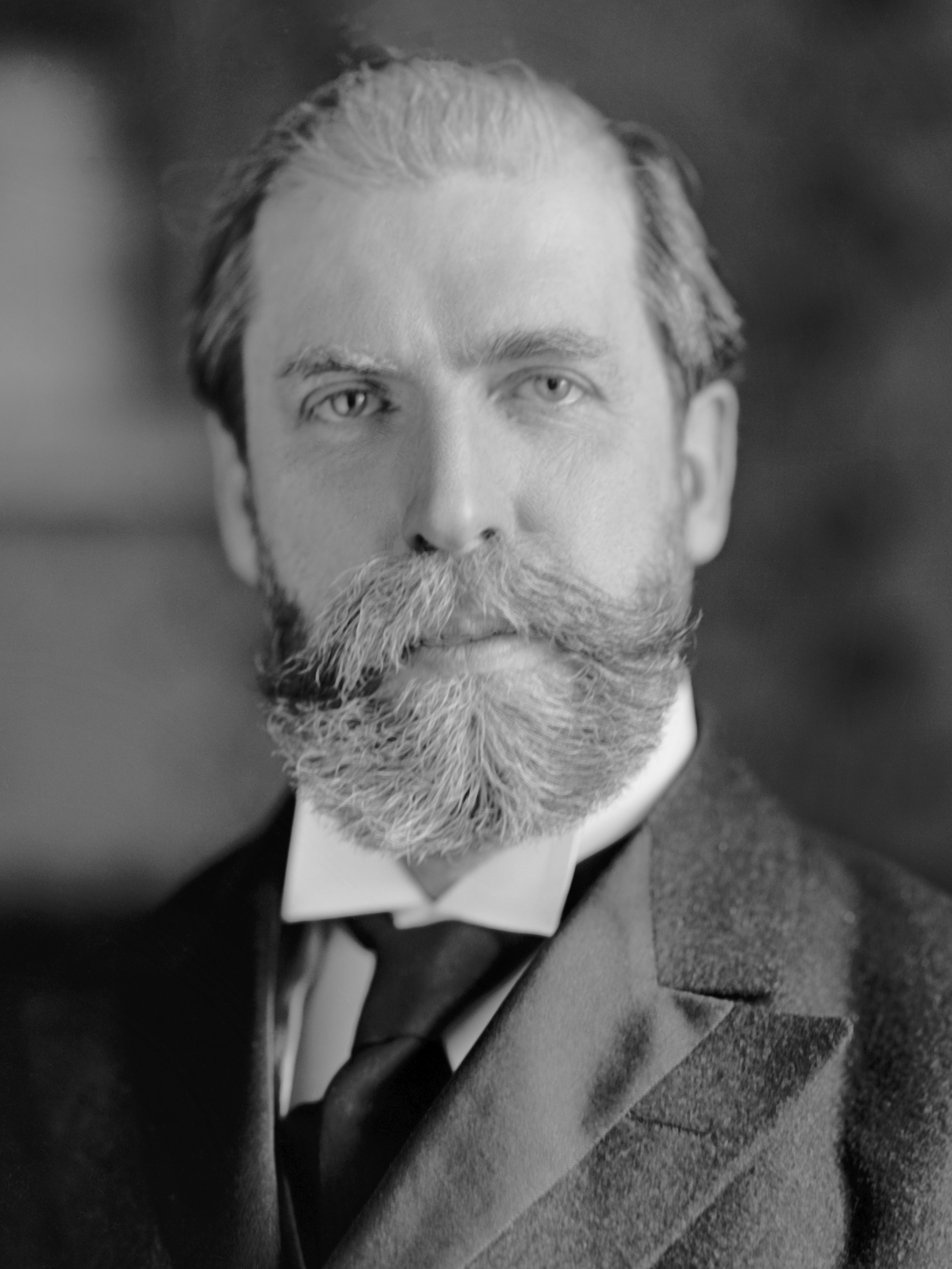

Nominee	Charles Evans Hughes	Woodrow Wilson
Party	Republican	Democratic
Home state	New York	New Jersey
Running mate	Charles W. Fairbanks	Thomas R. Marshall
Electoral vote	15	0
Popular vote	341,004	334,263
Percentage	47.43%	46.49%
County results
Hughes
40–50%
50–60%
60–70%
Wilson
40–50%
50–60%
60–70%
President before election
Woodrow Wilson
Democratic
Elected President
Woodrow Wilson
Democratic

A presidential election was held in Indiana on November 7, 1916, as part of the 1916 United States presidential election. The Republican ticket of the former associate justice of the Supreme Court of the United States Charles Evans Hughes and the former vice president of the United States Charles W. Fairbanks defeated the Democratic ticket of the incumbent president of the United States Woodrow Wilson and the incumbent vice president Thomas R. Marshall. Wilson defeated Hughes in the national election with 277 electoral votes.

== Background ==
Partisan coalitions in Indiana at the turn of the century reflected the regional, ethnic, and religious roots of the settler population, with the descendants of White Southerners, German Americans, and Irish Americans (especially Catholics) voting reliably Democratic, while Yankees, Nordic and Scandinavian Americans, and British Americans favored the Republican Party. Southern Indiana leaned Democratic and Northern Indiana leaned Republican, in line with the loose correlation between ethnicity and geography. The state's notable concentration of German Catholics contributed to its closeness in presidential elections during the Third Party System relative to other Lower North states. William Jennings Bryan's 1896 presidential campaign saw the state move more securely into the Republican column, as German Catholics alienated by Bryan's outspoken Evangelicalism, conservatives unnerved by the candidate's agrarian radicalism, and urban workers frightened by threats of mass layoffs in the event of a Bryan victory voted Republican for the first time. Following this political realignment, Wilson became the only Democrat to carry Indiana during the Fourth Party System (1896–1932) in 1912. Republican strength remained greater in urban areas than in rural areas based on the strength of Republican urban political machines.

== Primary elections ==
=== Republican Party ===
Indiana Republican primary, March 7, 1916
Party	Candidate	Votes	%
Republican	Charles W. Fairbanks	176,078	100.00
Total votes		176,078	100.00

=== Democratic Party ===
Indiana Democratic primary, March 7, 1916
Party	Candidate	Votes	%
Democratic	Woodrow Wilson	160,423	100.00
Total votes		160,423	100.00

=== Progressive Party ===
No candidates filed to run in the Indiana Progressive presidential primary, and consequently no primary election was held.

=== Socialist Party ===
Indiana Socialist referendum, January 15–March 1, 1916
Party	Candidate	Votes	%
Socialist	Allan L. Benson	727	77.18
Socialist	James H. Maurer	190	20.17
Socialist	Arthur LeSueur	25	2.65
Total votes		942	100.00

== General election ==
=== Results ===
Indiana chose 15 electors on a statewide general ticket. State law required voters to elect each member of the Electoral College individually, rather than as a group. This sometimes resulted in small differences in the number of votes cast for electors pledged to the same presidential candidate, if some voters did not vote for all the electors nominated by a party. The following table quotes the official returns published by the secretary of state of Indiana, which list the votes for the first elector on each ticket.

1916 United States presidential election in Indiana
Party	Candidate	Votes	%	±%
Republican	Charles Evans Hughes Charles W. Fairbanks	341,004	47.43	▲24.32
Democratic	Woodrow Wilson Thomas R. Marshall	334,263	46.49	▲3.42
Socialist	Allan L. Benson George Ross Kirkpatrick	21,860	3.04	▼2.60
Prohibition	Frank Hanly Ira Landrith	16,368	2.28	▼0.66
Progressive	N/A (Note: Theodore Roosevelt was nominated for president by the 1916 Progressive National Convention, but declined.) John M. Parker	3,898	0.54	▼24.21
Socialist Labor	Arthur E. Reimer Caleb Harrison	1,593	0.22	▼0.26
Total votes		718,986	100.00	

=== Results by county ===
1916 United States presidential election in Indiana by county
County	Charles E. Hughes Republican		Woodrow Wilson Democratic		Allan L. Benson Socialist		Frank Hanly Prohibition		Others		Margin		Total
County	Votes	%	Votes	%	Votes	%	Votes	%	Votes	%	Votes	%	Total
Adams	1,796	36.83%	2,875	58.96%	23	0.47%	171	3.51%	11	0.23%	-1,079	-22.13%	4,876
Allen	10,169	46.03%	9,470	42.87%	1,003	4.54%	421	1.91%	1,027	4.65%	699	3.16%	22,090
Bartholomew	3,287	47.08%	3,441	49.29%	66	0.95%	145	2.08%	42	0.60%	-154	-2.21%	6,981
Benton	1,872	54.17%	1,502	43.46%	23	0.67%	53	1.53%	6	0.17%	370	10.71%	3,456
Blackford	1,595	43.04%	1,867	50.38%	105	2.83%	126	3.40%	13	0.35%	-272	-7.34%	3,706
Boone	3,333	46.97%	3,513	49.51%	82	1.16%	125	1.76%	43	0.61%	-180	-2.54%	7,096
Brown	506	31.72%	1,046	65.58%	10	0.63%	31	1.94%	2	0.13%	-540	-33.86%	1,595
Carroll	2,468	49.09%	2,401	47.75%	34	0.68%	118	2.35%	7	0.14%	67	1.33%	5,028
Cass	4,879	47.08%	5,140	49.60%	121	1.17%	200	1.93%	23	0.22%	-261	-2.52%	10,363
Clark	3,173	46.15%	3,572	51.95%	73	1.06%	43	0.63%	15	0.22%	-399	-5.80%	6,876
Clay	3,102	42.82%	3,435	47.42%	562	7.76%	119	1.64%	26	0.36%	-333	-4.60%	7,244
Clinton	3,638	47.76%	3,662	48.07%	119	1.56%	184	2.42%	15	0.20%	-24	-0.32%	7,618
Crawford	1,201	41.05%	1,508	51.54%	58	1.98%	152	5.19%	7	0.24%	-307	-10.49%	2,926
Daviess	3,191	47.56%	3,143	46.84%	210	3.13%	128	1.91%	38	0.57%	48	0.72%	6,710
Dearborn	2,318	42.18%	3,010	54.78%	62	1.13%	97	1.77%	8	0.15%	-692	-12.59%	5,495
Decatur	2,717	51.39%	2,374	44.90%	69	1.31%	109	2.06%	18	0.34%	343	6.49%	5,287
DeKalb	2,898	43.53%	3,372	50.65%	136	2.04%	232	3.49%	19	0.29%	-474	-7.12%	6,657
Delaware	6,919	50.24%	5,946	43.18%	432	3.14%	407	2.96%	67	0.49%	973	7.07%	13,771
Dubois	1,492	32.07%	3,072	66.02%	19	0.41%	55	1.18%	15	0.32%	-1,580	-33.96%	4,653
Elkhart	5,850	45.21%	5,723	44.22%	708	5.47%	603	4.66%	57	0.44%	127	0.98%	12,941
Fayette	2,360	51.51%	2,074	45.26%	58	1.27%	64	1.40%	26	0.57%	286	6.24%	4,582
Floyd	3,200	43.99%	3,850	52.92%	140	1.92%	68	0.93%	17	0.23%	-650	-8.93%	7,275
Fountain	2,634	48.36%	2,437	44.74%	130	2.39%	88	1.62%	158	2.90%	197	3.62%	5,447
Franklin	1,495	37.24%	2,426	60.42%	8	0.20%	73	1.82%	13	0.32%	-931	-23.19%	4,015
Fulton	2,325	48.72%	2,231	46.75%	33	0.69%	63	1.32%	120	2.51%	94	1.97%	4,772
Gibson	3,576	45.84%	3,765	48.26%	201	2.58%	226	2.90%	33	0.42%	-189	-2.42%	7,801
Grant	6,059	43.38%	5,827	41.72%	1,019	7.30%	980	7.02%	82	0.59%	232	1.66%	13,967
Greene	3,878	43.33%	3,990	44.59%	833	9.31%	199	2.22%	49	0.55%	-112	-1.25%	8,949
Hamilton	3,951	54.78%	2,799	38.81%	72	1.00%	362	5.02%	28	0.39%	1,152	15.97%	7,212
Hancock	2,138	41.56%	2,779	54.02%	47	0.91%	166	3.23%	14	0.27%	-641	-12.46%	5,144
Harrison	2,086	44.97%	2,373	51.15%	64	1.38%	98	2.11%	18	0.39%	-287	-6.19%	4,639
Hendricks	3,046	53.13%	2,453	42.79%	88	1.53%	118	2.06%	28	0.49%	593	10.34%	5,733
Henry	4,386	50.01%	3,560	40.59%	265	3.02%	378	4.31%	182	2.08%	826	9.42%	8,771
Howard	4,777	47.38%	3,934	39.02%	840	8.33%	456	4.52%	75	0.74%	843	8.36%	10,082
Huntington	3,761	45.73%	3,833	46.60%	149	1.81%	450	5.47%	32	0.39%	-72	-0.88%	8,225
Jackson	2,422	40.65%	3,312	55.59%	74	1.24%	139	2.33%	11	0.18%	-890	-14.94%	5,958
Jasper	1,995	56.50%	1,488	42.14%	10	0.28%	33	0.93%	5	0.14%	507	14.36%	3,531
Jay	3,075	46.49%	3,070	46.41%	109	1.65%	348	5.26%	13	0.20%	5	0.08%	6,615
Jefferson	2,675	49.76%	2,518	46.84%	56	1.04%	113	2.10%	14	0.26%	157	2.92%	5,376
Jennings	1,791	50.01%	1,686	47.08%	34	0.95%	60	1.68%	10	0.28%	105	2.93%	3,581
Johnson	2,428	42.32%	3,108	54.17%	53	0.92%	107	1.87%	41	0.71%	-680	-11.85%	5,737
Knox	4,805	42.28%	5,380	47.34%	923	8.12%	142	1.25%	114	1.00%	-575	-5.06%	11,364
Kosciusko	4,025	51.18%	3,447	43.83%	134	1.70%	232	2.95%	27	0.34%	578	7.35%	7,865
LaGrange	1,958	54.09%	1,512	41.77%	43	1.19%	93	2.57%	14	0.39%	446	12.32%	3,620
Lake	13,262	55.00%	9,946	41.25%	651	2.70%	108	0.45%	144	0.60%	3,316	13.75%	24,111
LaPorte	5,726	50.29%	5,276	46.33%	240	2.11%	83	0.73%	62	0.54%	450	3.95%	11,387
Lawrence	3,813	52.55%	3,108	42.83%	246	3.39%	66	0.91%	23	0.32%	705	9.72%	7,256
Madison	7,449	41.96%	8,106	45.66%	1,579	8.89%	484	2.73%	134	0.75%	-657	-3.70%	17,752
Marion	40,699	51.50%	35,043	44.34%	2,224	2.81%	744	0.94%	320	0.40%	5,656	7.16%	79,030
Marshall	2,855	44.64%	3,221	50.36%	77	1.20%	216	3.38%	27	0.42%	-366	-5.72%	6,396
Martin	1,534	48.93%	1,549	49.41%	26	0.83%	22	0.70%	4	0.13%	-15	-0.48%	3,135
Miami	3,390	43.16%	3,854	49.07%	303	3.86%	214	2.72%	93	1.18%	-464	-5.91%	7,854
Monroe	3,033	50.31%	2,796	46.38%	58	0.96%	105	1.74%	37	0.61%	237	3.93%	6,029
Montgomery	4,300	49.36%	4,107	47.15%	147	1.69%	106	1.22%	51	0.59%	193	2.22%	8,711
Morgan	2,860	50.06%	2,616	45.79%	113	1.98%	94	1.65%	30	0.53%	244	4.27%	5,713
Newton	1,377	47.58%	1,278	44.16%	36	1.24%	43	1.49%	160	5.53%	99	3.42%	2,894
Noble	3,417	51.33%	3,069	46.10%	35	0.53%	130	1.95%	6	0.09%	348	5.23%	6,657
Ohio	597	47.46%	632	50.24%	3	0.24%	25	1.99%	1	0.08%	-35	-2.78%	1,258
Orange	2,481	52.94%	2,091	44.62%	52	1.11%	42	0.90%	20	0.43%	390	8.32%	4,686
Owen	1,585	44.67%	1,812	51.07%	95	2.68%	42	1.18%	14	0.39%	-227	-6.40%	3,548
Parke	2,598	48.52%	2,329	43.50%	212	3.96%	184	3.44%	31	0.58%	269	5.02%	5,354
Perry	1,762	45.11%	2,089	53.48%	28	0.72%	15	0.38%	12	0.31%	-327	-8.37%	3,906
Pike	2,172	46.71%	2,212	47.57%	187	4.02%	59	1.27%	20	0.43%	-40	-0.86%	4,650
Porter	2,913	59.22%	1,871	38.04%	76	1.55%	37	0.75%	22	0.45%	1,042	21.18%	4,919
Posey	2,291	42.97%	2,922	54.80%	26	0.49%	86	1.61%	7	0.13%	-631	-11.83%	5,332
Pulaski	1,474	46.79%	1,387	44.03%	27	0.86%	58	1.84%	204	6.48%	87	2.76%	3,150
Putnam	2,453	43.28%	2,965	52.31%	132	2.33%	86	1.52%	32	0.56%	-512	-9.03%	5,668
Randolph	4,054	54.31%	2,682	35.93%	128	1.71%	525	7.03%	75	1.00%	1,372	18.38%	7,464
Ripley	2,686	49.88%	2,549	47.34%	67	1.24%	67	1.24%	16	0.30%	137	2.54%	5,385
Rush	2,950	51.22%	2,569	44.60%	57	0.99%	160	2.78%	24	0.42%	381	6.61%	5,760
St. Joseph	7,961	43.02%	9,709	52.47%	24	0.13%	436	2.36%	375	2.03%	-1,748	-9.45%	18,505
Scott	802	41.99%	1,068	55.92%	4	0.21%	31	1.62%	5	0.26%	-266	-13.93%	1,910
Shelby	3,201	42.90%	3,900	52.27%	81	1.09%	242	3.24%	37	0.50%	-699	-9.37%	7,461
Spencer	2,560	50.34%	2,335	45.92%	50	0.98%	122	2.40%	18	0.35%	225	4.42%	5,085
Starke	1,550	52.21%	1,334	44.93%	44	1.48%	35	1.18%	6	0.20%	216	7.28%	2,969
Steuben	2,418	50.72%	1,427	29.93%	657	13.78%	255	5.35%	10	0.21%	991	20.79%	4,767
Sullivan	2,630	35.24%	3,880	51.99%	667	8.94%	205	2.75%	81	1.09%	-1,250	-16.75%	7,463
Switzerland	1,214	44.05%	1,446	52.47%	36	1.31%	58	2.10%	2	0.07%	-232	-8.42%	2,756
Tippecanoe	6,386	54.73%	4,918	42.15%	108	0.93%	208	1.78%	49	0.42%	1,468	12.58%	11,669
Tipton	2,166	45.32%	2,337	48.90%	62	1.30%	203	4.25%	11	0.23%	-171	-3.58%	4,779
Union	997	52.95%	826	43.87%	19	1.01%	38	2.02%	3	0.16%	171	9.08%	1,883
Vanderburgh	9,966	47.52%	10,028	47.81%	717	3.42%	185	0.88%	77	0.37%	-62	-0.30%	20,973
Vermillion	2,607	43.61%	2,343	39.19%	771	12.90%	133	2.22%	124	2.07%	264	4.42%	5,978
Vigo	8,934	39.71%	11,165	49.63%	1,677	7.45%	516	2.29%	204	0.91%	-2,231	-9.92%	22,496
Wabash	3,849	50.37%	3,168	41.46%	277	3.63%	293	3.83%	54	0.71%	681	8.91%	7,641
Warren	1,823	61.67%	1,011	34.20%	45	1.52%	67	2.27%	10	0.34%	812	27.47%	2,956
Warrick	2,396	48.41%	2,244	45.34%	57	1.15%	88	1.78%	164	3.31%	152	3.07%	4,949
Washington	1,871	42.80%	2,414	55.23%	29	0.66%	48	1.10%	9	0.21%	-543	-12.42%	4,371
Wayne	6,112	51.84%	5,007	42.46%	295	2.50%	303	2.57%	74	0.63%	1,105	9.37%	11,791
Wells	1,947	37.26%	2,928	56.03%	56	1.07%	285	5.45%	10	0.19%	-981	-18.77%	5,226
White	2,442	50.66%	2,262	46.93%	35	0.73%	71	1.47%	10	0.21%	180	3.73%	4,820
Whitley	2,191	44.69%	2,510	51.19%	26	0.53%	170	3.47%	6	0.12%	-319	-6.51%	4,903
TOTAL	341,004	47.43%	334,263	46.49%	21,855	3.04%	16,368	2.28%	5,491	0.76%	6,741	0.94	718,986

== See also ==
- United States presidential elections in Indiana

== Bibliography ==
- Congressional Quarterly (1985). Congressional Quarterly's Guide to U.S. Elections (2nd ed.). Washington D.C.: Congressional Quarterly. ISBN 978-0-87187-339-2.
- Cook, Homer L. (1916). Biennial Report of Homer L. Cook, Secretary of State of the State of Indiana [...]. Indianapolis.
- Madison, James H. (1986). The Indiana Way: A State History. Bloomington: Indiana University Press.
- Phillips, Kevin P. (1969). The Emerging Republican Majority. New Rochelle, NY: Arlington House. LCCN 76-79602.
- Petersen, Svend (1963). A Statistical History of the American Presidential Elections. New York: Frederick Ungar Publishing Company. LCCN 62-21786.
- Sullivan, Reginald; Thompson, William H.; Headrick, William D., eds. (1916). Election Laws of Indiana [...]. Indianapolis: State Board of Election Commissioners.
