= List of mayors of Minot, North Dakota =

This is an incomplete list of mayors of Minot, North Dakota.

== List ==
No.	Image	Mayor	Term	Party	
1		James H. Scofield	1887–1888	—N/a	
2		Edmund Belvea	1888–1890	—N/a	
3		Allan Tompkins	1890–1896	—N/a	
4		Peter P. Lee	1896–1898	—N/a	
5		Christopher A. Johnson	1898–1902	—N/a	
6		Joseph Roach	1902–1904	—N/a	
7		David C. Greenleaf	1904–1907	—N/a	
8		Sam H. Clark	1904–1907	—N/a	
9		Arthur LeSueur	1909 – May 17, 1911	Socialist	
–		F. L. Sherman	May 17, 1911 – June 20, 1911	—N/a	
10		Halvor L. Halvorson	June 20, 1911 – 1915	Democratic	
11		William S. Shaw	1915–1921	—N/a	
12		Winfield M. Smart	1921–1925	—N/a	
13		Jack A. Patterson	1932–1938	Republican/NPL	
14		Victor E. Sandberg	1938–1945	—N/a	
15		Henry C. Kiehn	1953–1954	—N/a	
16		W. Maurice Harrington	1954–1962	—N/a	
17		Clarence D. Johnson	1962–1970	—N/a	
18		Chester Reiten	1970–1982	—N/a	
19		Thomas Oliver Lee	1982–1984	—N/a	
20		Chester Reiten	1984–1986	—N/a	
21		George Christensen	1988–1996	—N/a	
22		Orlin W. Backes	1996–1998	—N/a	
23		Carroll Erickson	1998–2002	—N/a	
24		Curt Zimbelman	2002–2014	—N/a	
25		Chuck Barney	2014–2018	—N/a	
26		Shaun Sipma	2018–2022	Republican	
27		Tom Ross	2022–2025	—N/a	
28		Mark Jantzer	2025 - present	Republican	—N/a
