= Jim Kusler =

American politician

Jim Kusler was the former Secretary of State of North Dakota from 1989 to 1992. He farmed near Beulah, North Dakota.

Kusler was also co-host of the radio show "Friday Night Live", which airs Friday nights on KDKT-AM radio in West-Central North Dakota. Kusler was also the owner of Brush Creek Organic Foods LLC, an organic farm that sells products to health food stores nationally.

Kusler was the only Democrat to ever serve as North Dakota's secretary of state. He died on November 7, 2021

== Notes ==
Party political offices
Preceded by Byron Knutson	Democratic nominee for North Dakota Secretary of State; 1988, 1992	Succeeded by Shelley Seeberg
Political offices
Preceded by Ben Meier	Secretary of State of North Dakota; 1989–1992	Succeeded by Al Jaeger
