= Edward F. Porter =

American politician (1858–1915)

4th North Dakota Secretary of State
- In office January 1, 1901 – December 31, 1906
- Governor: Frank White; Elmore Y. Sarles
- Preceded by: Fred Falley
- Succeeded by: Alfred Blaisdell

Personal details
- Born: September 14, 1858
- Died: February 7, 1915 (aged 56)
- Party: Republican

Edward F. Porter (September 14, 1858 – February 7, 1915) was an American politician who, as a member of the North Dakota Republican Party, served as North Dakota's 4th Secretary of State from 1901 to 1906.

Edward F. Porter first won election in 1900 and was re-elected in 1902 and 1904. He did not seek re-election in 1906 and left the office after serving three terms—the first North Dakota Secretary of State to do so. Prior to his election to the statewide office, Porter served in the North Dakota House of Representatives from 1895 to 1898, and in the North Dakota Senate from 1899 to 1900.

== Notes ==
Preceded by Fred Falley	Secretary of State of North Dakota; 1901–1906	Succeeded by Alfred Blaisdell
