= Shaun Sipma =

109th Mayor of Minot, North Dakota

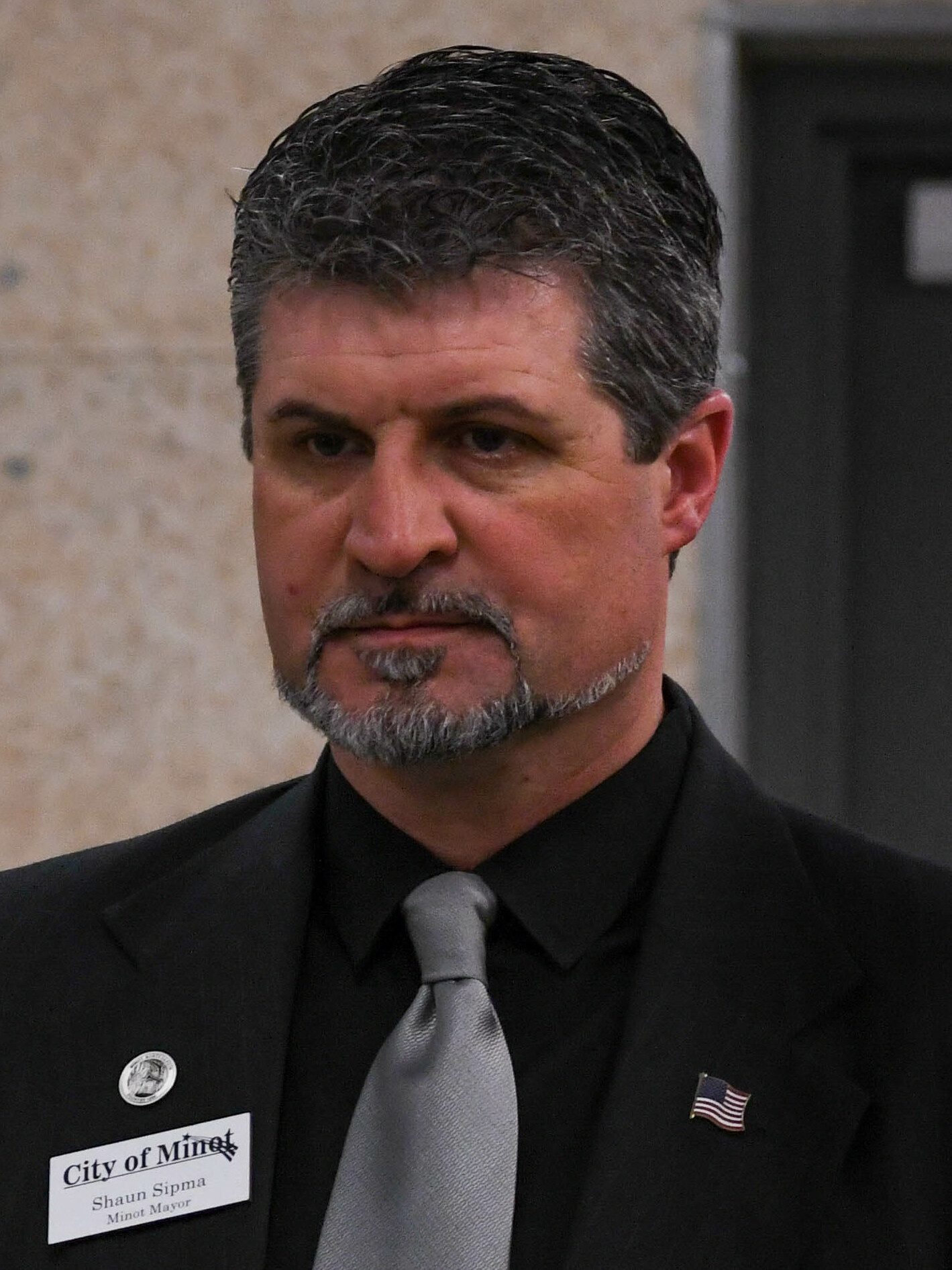

26th Mayor of Minot
- In office June 26, 2018 – June 28, 2022
- Preceded by: Chuck Barney
- Succeeded by: Tom Ross

Member of the Minot City Council, 5th Ward
- In office 2016–2018
- Preceded by: Tom Seymour
- Succeeded by: Stephan Podrygula

Personal details
- Born: Bowman, North Dakota, U.S.
- Party: Republican
- Spouse: Keri Sipma
- Children: 2
- Education: Minot State University _{(B.A.)}
- Website: web.archive.org/web/20210303105007/https://www.minotnd.org/directory.aspx?EID=83

Shaun Sipma is an American journalist and politician who served as the Mayor of Minot, North Dakota from June 2018 to June 2022.

== Early life ==
Sipma worked as a journalist, working with KXMC-TV in Minot as a news anchor from 2000 to 2013. After this, he became an agent for the North Dakota Farmers Union Insurance. Sipma served as the Alderman for the 5th Ward from 2016 to 2017. Sipma also serves on the Board of the Farm Rescue Foundation.

== Political career ==
In 2016, incumbent Alderman Tom Seymour decided not to run for reelection to the Minot City Council representing Ward 5, and Sipma decided to run for the seat. He said the primary issue at hand was flood control. Sipma said he decided to run for City Council because he saw a lack of leadership, with incumbents acting more like city liaisons rather than leaders. Sipma won the election with 80 percent of the vote. One year later, he won reelection to the City Council when the Council was reorganized.

When incumbent mayor Chuck Barney decided not to run for reelection in 2018, Sipma announced his candidacy the next day. During his campaign, he said that the city needed to plan long-term, which it hadn't been doing for too long. He favored stabilizing the city's work force in order to reduce the cost of constantly replacing employees. Sipma won the election with 49 percent of the total vote.

In August 2020, during the COVID-19 pandemic, Mayor Sipma and the City Council unanimously approved a resolution requiring city employees to wear face coverings when a six-foot distance cannot be maintained or when the employee is instructed to do so by their medical provider or their supervisor. The resolution recommends the general public do the same, but without any penalties or enforcement measures. In October, Mayor Sipma instituted a requirement to wear a face covering in public, without any penalty or enforcement measures.

In September 2020, Sipma approved a decision to fly the LGBTQI flag underneath the US and State flags. During a council meeting, a resident voiced his strong disagreement with that decision. Sipma responded, "It's been referenced a couple of times that there isn't hate or that they're not against those folks. ...I've experienced a tremendous amount of hate towards me and towards the folks that fit under that umbrella. So, what led to my decision on that was also seeing a population within our community that does need to have that issue addressed—the issue of hate. When they came to me, they had stated that they wanted a call for kindness, not necessarily acceptance, but a call for kindness. And that I can appreciate." In 2025 after Mayor Tom Ross resigned as mayor, Sipma was rumored to potentially run for mayor to return to office but instead said he wouldn’t and spoke support for Acting Mayor and City Council President Mark Jantzer in his bid. Shaun Sipma will not seek to return as Minot mayor, supports Mark Jantzer in bid
