= List of United States senators in the 69th Congress =

This is a complete list of United States senators during the 69th United States Congress listed by seniority from March 4, 1925, to March 3, 1927.

Order of service is based on the commencement of the senator's first term. Behind this is former service as a senator (only giving the senator seniority within their new incoming class), service as vice president, a House member, a cabinet secretary, or a governor of a state. The final factor is the population of the senator's state.

Senators who were sworn in during the middle of the Congress (up until the last senator who was not sworn in early after winning the November 1926 election) are listed at the end of the list with no number.

== Terms of service ==
Class	Terms of service of senators that expired in years
Class 3	Terms of service of senators that expired in 1927 (AL, AR, AZ, CA, CO, CT, FL, GA, ID, IL, IN, IA, KS, KY, LA, MD, MO, NC, ND, NH, NV, NY, OH, OK, OR, PA, SC, SD, UT, VT, WA, and WI.)
Class 1	Terms of service of senators that expired in 1929 (AZ, CA, CT, DE, FL, IN, MA, MD, ME, MI, MN, MO, MS, MT, ND, NE, NJ, NM, NV, NY, OH, PA, RI, TN, TX, UT, VA, VT, WA, WI, WV, and WY.)
Class 2	Terms of service of senators that expired in 1931 (AL, AR, CO, DE, GA, IA, ID, IL, KS, KY, LA, MA, ME, MI, MN, MS, MT, NC, NE, NH, NJ, NM, OK, OR, RI, SC, SD, TN, TX, VA, WV, and WY.)

== U.S. Senate seniority list ==
U.S. Senate seniority
Rank	Senator (party-state)	Seniority date	Other factors
1	Francis E. Warren (R-WY)	March 4, 1895	
2	Furnifold M. Simmons (D-NC)	March 4, 1901	
3	Lee S. Overman (D-NC)	March 4, 1903	North Carolina 15th in population (1900)
4	Reed Smoot (R-UT)	March 4, 1903	Utah 41st in population (1900)
5	Robert M. La Follette, Sr. (R-WI)	January 4, 1906	
6	William Borah (R-ID)	March 4, 1907	
7	Albert B. Cummins (R-IA)	November 24, 1908	Former governor
8	Wesley Jones (R-WA)	March 4, 1909	Former representative
9	Ellison D. Smith (D-SC)	March 4, 1909	South Carolina 24th in population (1900)
10	Duncan U. Fletcher (D-FL)	March 4, 1909	Florida 33rd in population (1900)
11	Claude A. Swanson (D-VA)	August 1, 1910	
12	George P. McLean (R-CT)	March 4, 1911	Former governor
13	James A. Reed (D-MO)	March 4, 1911	
14	Henry F. Ashurst (D-AZ)	April 2, 1912	
15	Key Pittman (D-NV)	January 29, 1913	
16	Morris Sheppard (D-TX)	February 3, 1913	
17	Joseph E. Ransdell (D-LA)	March 4, 1913	Former representative (14 years)
18	Joseph Robinson (R-AR)	March 4, 1913	Former representative (10 years), former governor
19	George W. Norris (R-NE)	March 4, 1913	Former representative (10 years)
20	Thomas J. Walsh (D-MT)	March 4, 1913	
21	Charles Curtis (R-KS)	March 4, 1915	Previously a senator
22	Oscar Underwood (D-AL)	March 4, 1915	Former representative
23	James Wadsworth, Jr. (R-NY)	March 4, 1915	
24	Bert Fernald (R-ME)	September 12, 1916	
25	James Watson (R-IN)	November 8, 1916	
26	Kenneth McKellar (D-TN)	March 4, 1917	Former representative (6 years)
27	William H. King (D-UT)	March 4, 1917	Former representative (3 years)
28	Peter G. Gerry (D-RI)	March 4, 1917	Former representative (2 years)
29	Park Trammell (D-FL)	March 4, 1917	Former governor, Florida 33rd in population (1910)
30	John B. Kendrick (D-WY)	March 4, 1917	Former governor, Wyoming 47th in population (1910)
31	Frederick Hale (R-ME)	March 4, 1917	Maine 34th in population (1910)
32	Andrieus Jones (D-NM)	March 4, 1917	New Mexico 43rd in population (1910)
33	Hiram Johnson (R-CA)	March 16, 1917	
34	Irvine Lenroot (R-WI)	April 18, 1918	
35	Selden P. Spencer (R-MO)	November 6, 1918	Missouri 7th in population (1910)
36	George H. Moses (R-NH)	November 6, 1918	New Hampshire 39th in population (1910)
37	Charles L. McNary (R-OR)	December 18, 1918	
38	Arthur Capper (R-KS)	March 4, 1919	Former governor, Kansas 22nd in population (1910)
39	Henry W. Keyes (R-NH)	March 4, 1919	Former governor, New Hampshire 39th in population (1910)
40	William J. Harris (D-GA)	March 4, 1919	Georgia 10th in population (1910)
41	Lawrence C. Phipps (R-CO)	March 4, 1919	Colorado 32nd in population (1910)
42	Pat Harrison (D-MS)	March 5, 1919	
43	Walter E. Edge (R-NJ)	May 19, 1919	
44	Carter Glass (D-VA)	February 2, 1920	
45	James Thomas Heflin (D-AL)	November 2, 1920	
46	Frank B. Willis (R-OH)	January 14, 1921	
47	Frank R. Gooding (R-ID)	January 15, 1921	
48	William B. McKinley (R-IL)	March 4, 1921	Former representative (14 years)
49	Thaddeus H. Caraway (D-AR)	March 4, 1921	Former representative (8 years)
50	John Harreld (R-OK)	March 4, 1921	Former representative (2 years)
51	Ralph H. Cameron (R-AZ)	March 4, 1921	Former delegate
52	Peter Norbeck (R-SD)	March 4, 1921	Former governor, South Dakota 37th in population (1920)
53	Samuel M. Shortridge (R-CA)	March 4, 1921	California 8th in population (1920)
54	Richard P. Ernst (R-KY)	March 4, 1921	Kentucky 15th in population (1920)
55	Edwin S. Broussard (D-LA)	March 4, 1921	Louisiana 22nd in population (1920)
56	Ovington Weller (R-MD)	March 4, 1921	Maryland 28th in population (1920)
57	Robert Stanfield (R-OR)	March 4, 1921	Oregon 34th in population (1920)
58	Edwin Ladd (R-ND)	March 4, 1921	North Dakota 36th in population (1920)
59	Tasker Oddie (R-NV)	March 4, 1921	Nevada 48th in population (1920)
60	George W. Pepper (R-PA)	January 9, 1922	
61	David A. Reed (R-PA)	August 8, 1922	
62	Thomas F. Bayard, Jr. (D-DE)	November 7, 1922	
63	Walter F. George (D-GA)	November 22, 1922	
64	James Couzens (R-MI)	November 29, 1922	
66	Smith W. Brookhart (R-IA)	December 1, 1922	
66	Frank L. Greene (R-VT)	March 4, 1923	Former representative (11 years)
67	Simeon Fess (R-OH)	March 4, 1923	Former representative (10 years), Ohio 4th in population (1920)
68	Hubert D. Stephens (D-MS)	March 4, 1923	Former representative (10 years), Mississippi 23rd in population (1920)
69	Matthew M. Neely (D-WV)	March 4, 1923	Former representative (8 years)
70	Clarence Dill (D-WA)	March 4, 1923	Former representative (4 years)
71	Woodbridge N. Ferris (D-MI)	March 4, 1923	Former governor, Michigan 7th in population (1920)
72	Edward I. Edwards (D-NJ)	March 4, 1923	Former governor, New Jersey 10th in population (1920)
73	Samuel M. Ralston (D-IN)	March 4, 1923	Former governor, Indiana 11th in population (1920)
74	Lynn Frazier (R-ND)	March 4, 1923	Former governor, North Dakota 36th in population (1920)
75	Royal S. Copeland (D-NY)	March 4, 1923	New York 1st in population (1920)
76	Earle B. Mayfield (D-TX)	March 4, 1923	Texas 5th in population (1920)
77	Henrik Shipstead (FL-MN)	March 4, 1923	Minnesota 17th in population (1920)
78	William C. Bruce (D-MD)	March 4, 1923	Maryland 28th in population (1920)
79	Robert B. Howell (R-NE)	March 4, 1923	Nebraska 31st in population (1920)
80	Burton K. Wheeler (D-MT)	March 4, 1923	Montana 39th in population (1920)
81	Porter H. Dale (R-VT)	November 7, 1923	
82	Jesse H. Metcalf (R-RI)	November 4, 1924	
83	William M. Butler (R-MA)	November 13, 1924	
84	Rice W. Means (R-CO)	December 1, 1924	
85	Hiram Bingham (R-CT)	December 17, 1924	
86	Charles S. Deneen (R-IL)	February 26, 1925	
87	Coleman du Pont (R-DE)	March 4, 1925	Previously a senator
88	Frederick H. Gillett (R-MA)	March 4, 1925	Former representative (32 years)
89	Thomas D. Schall (R-MN)	March 4, 1925	Former representative (10 years)
90	Coleman L. Blease (R-SC)	March 4, 1925	Former governor, South Carolina 26th in population (1920)
91	William McMaster (R-SD)	March 4, 1925	Former governor, South Dakota 37th in population (1920)
92	Frederic Sackett (R-KY)	March 4, 1925	Kentucky 15th in population (1920)
93	Lawrence Tyson (R-TN)	March 4, 1925	Tennessee 19th in population (1920)
94	William B. Pine (R-OK)	March 4, 1925	Oklahoma 21st in population (1920)
95	Guy D. Goff (R-WV)	March 4, 1925	West Virginia 27th in population (1920)
96	Sam G. Bratton (D-NM)	March 4, 1925	New Mexico`43rd in population (1920)
—	George H. Williams (R-MO)	May 25, 1925	
—	Robert M. La Follette, Jr. (R-WI)	September 30, 1925	
—	Arthur Robinson (R-IN)	October 20, 1925	
—	Gerald Nye (R-ND)	November 14, 1925	
—	Daniel F. Steck (D-IA)	April 12, 1926	
—	David W. Stewart (R-IA)	August 7, 1926	
—	Arthur R. Gould (R-ME)	November 30, 1926	
—	David I. Walsh (D-MA)	December 6, 1926	Previously a senator
—	Harry B. Hawes (D-MO)	December 6, 1926	

== See also ==
- 69th United States Congress
- List of United States representatives in the 69th Congress
