= Herman Thorson =

American politician

10th North Dakota Secretary of State
- In office January 1, 1941 – December 31, 1942
- Governor: John Moses
- Preceded by: James D. Gronna
- Succeeded by: Thomas Hall

Personal details
- Born: December 18, 1880 Houston, Minnesota
- Died: December 11, 1960 (aged 79) Bismarck, North Dakota
- Party: Republican

Herman Thorson (December 18, 1880 – December 11, 1960) was a North Dakota Republican Party politician who served as the Secretary of State of North Dakota from 1941 to 1942. He first won election in 1940, but was defeated in 1942 by Thomas Hall, also a Republican. Before serving as Secretary of State, he served in the North Dakota Senate from 1929 to 1940.

== Biography ==
Herman Thorson was born in 1880 on a farm near Houston, Minnesota. His parents were of Norwegian descent, and he was educated in the schools of Minnesota. He operated a creamery in Sheldon Township, Minnesota for three years before moving to a homestead in 1908 in Adams County, North Dakota. He served on his township board, and was Chairman of the county board of the Farmer's Union before he began his legislative career in the North Dakota Senate in 1928. He served in the Senate until 1940 when he was elected as the North Dakota Secretary of State. He served in that position for just one two-year term; he was defeated in his bid for a second term. Thorson married Sophia Moen, also of Houston, and had one boy and three girls (Obert Thorson, Berget Arndorfer, Minnie Larson and Clarice Henrickson). He died in Bismarck, North Dakota at the age of 79 in 1960.

== Notes ==
Party political offices
Preceded by James D. Gronna	Republican nominee for North Dakota Secretary of State; 1940, 1942	Succeeded by Thomas Hall
Political offices
Preceded by James D. Gronna	Secretary of State of North Dakota; 1941–1942	Succeeded by Thomas Hall
