= Peter P. Lee =

Peter P. Lee (March 16, 1861 – May 31, 1937) was an American politician. In 1861, he was born in Dovre Municipality in Oppland, Norway (then a part of Sweden-Norway). His family moved to Renville County, Minnesota, in 1866. In 1887, Lee relocated to Minot, North Dakota. Lee became Vice President and Director of the Great Northern Bank in Minot. Lee also began operating a general store on Main Street. The building, which formerly served as a tavern, become known as the Lee Block. In 1906, Lee sold the store Julius Fauchauld. Fauchald, in turn, sold the building in 1912 to Woolworth's, which operated a store there until 1982. In 1896, Peter Lee became the fourth mayor of the city of Minot, serving one term. He died on May 31, 1937, in Bellingham, Washington.
