= Arthur LeSueur =

American journalist

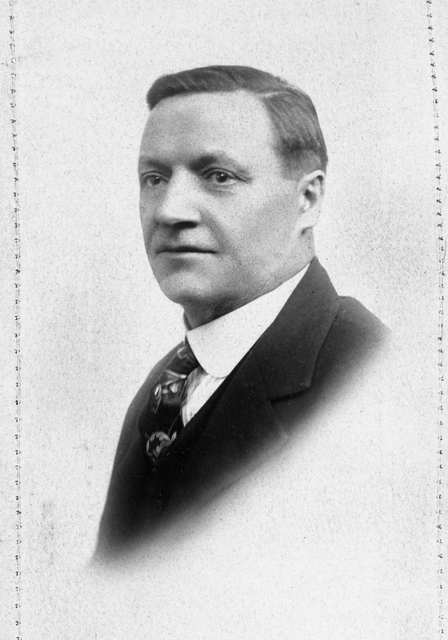
- Arthur LeSueur c. 1912

9th President of the Minot City Commission
- In office July 19, 1909 – May 17, 1911
- Preceded by: Sam H. Clark
- Succeeded by: Halvor L. Halvorson

Personal details
- Born: December 7, 1867 Hastings, Minnesota, U.S.
- Died: March 19, 1950 (aged 82) Minneapolis, Minnesota, U.S.
- Party: Socialist
- Other political affiliations: Nonpartisan League
- Spouse: Ida M. Winslow
- Children: Meridel Le Sueur (stepdaughter)
- Parents: John LeSueur (father); Amy LeSueur (mother)
- Education: University of Michigan

Arthur LeSueur or Arthur Le Sueur (December 7, 1867– March 19, 1950) was an American newspaper editor, politician, and lawyer. LeSueur, a socialist, served as the mayor of Minot, North Dakota from 1909 until his resignation in 1911.

== Early life ==
Arthur LeSueur was born on December 7, 1867, in Hastings, Minnesota, to John and Amy LeSueur, who had recently arrived in America from Jersey, in the Channel Islands. As a child, LeSueur's mother died in an accident and Arthur was forced along with his siblings into farm work at a very young age.

In 1880, LeSueur left the family farm and moved to Arvilla, Dakota Territory, where he worked as a wood-cutter in the winter months and a grain thresher during the harvest season. During this time, LeSueur saved extra money for law school tuition. In 1889, he began working at a law office in Grand Forks. In 1891, he graduated from the University of Michigan with a law degree and began his law practice in Minot, North Dakota, in 1900, after relocating there with his wife Ida M. Winslow whom he had married in Arvilla on October 17, 1896.

== Career ==
In 1902, LeSueur was one of the primary organizers of the Socialist Party of North Dakota, establishing this state affiliate of the Socialist Party of America along with Fargo activist Arthur Bassett and others. Speaking around the state constantly in support of the organization and the cause, LeSueur became the best known representative of the socialist movement in the state.

In 1906 and 1908, he ran unsuccessfully for North Dakota Attorney General. In 1909, LeSueur was elected as an alderman from Ward 3 and later narrowly defeated Martin Jacobson with 461 votes to 424 votes to become president of Minot's city commission. In October, he attended a conference in St. Louis with 700 other mayors to celebrate the 100th anniversary of the city. In May 1911, members of the Socialist affiliate in Minot urged LeSueur to resign as they believed that the majority of the town were unsupportive of his administration and on May 17, 1911, he and Alderman R. H. Emerson resigned. At the Socialist Party of North Dakota's state convention in February 1912, he won the party's nomination for the third congressional district and went on to win 20.61% of the vote against incumbent Patrick Daniel Norton's 50.74%.

Arthur LeSueur as he was depicted on a 1914 poster produced by the Socialist Party of North Dakota.

During World War I, LeSueur was tapped to head the legal department of People's College, a socialist-oriented correspondence school located in Fort Scott, Kansas. During this time, LaSueur worked with Eugene V. Debs, a labor leader and Socialist Party of America candidate, who served as Chancellor of the school.

During the years of World War I the Socialist Party of North Dakota dissolved, with its adherents joining the fledgling Nonpartisan League, headed by Arthur C. Townley. LeSueur was active in support of this new organization. During the 1916 presidential election, he ran for the Socialist Party nomination and was the only candidate that appeared on the North Dakota ballot, but later went on to lose the nomination to Allan L. Benson with LeSueur only taking 3,495 out of the 32,398 mail-order ballot votes. The Nonpartisan League developed financial problems in 1921, leading Townley to resign his post as president of the organization the following year. The NPL was disbanded in 1923.

== Later life ==
While working at People's College, he met Marian Wharton, the head of the English department. The couple soon married and moved to St. Paul, Minnesota. LeSueur thereby became the stepfather of the writer Meridel Le Sueur.

On March 19, 1950, he died at age 82 in Minneapolis.

== Works ==
- "Legal Side Lights on Murder," International Socialist Review, vol. 17, no. 5 (November 1916), pp. 298–300.

== See also ==
- List of elected socialist mayors in the United States
