= Fred Falley =

American politician (1859–1907)

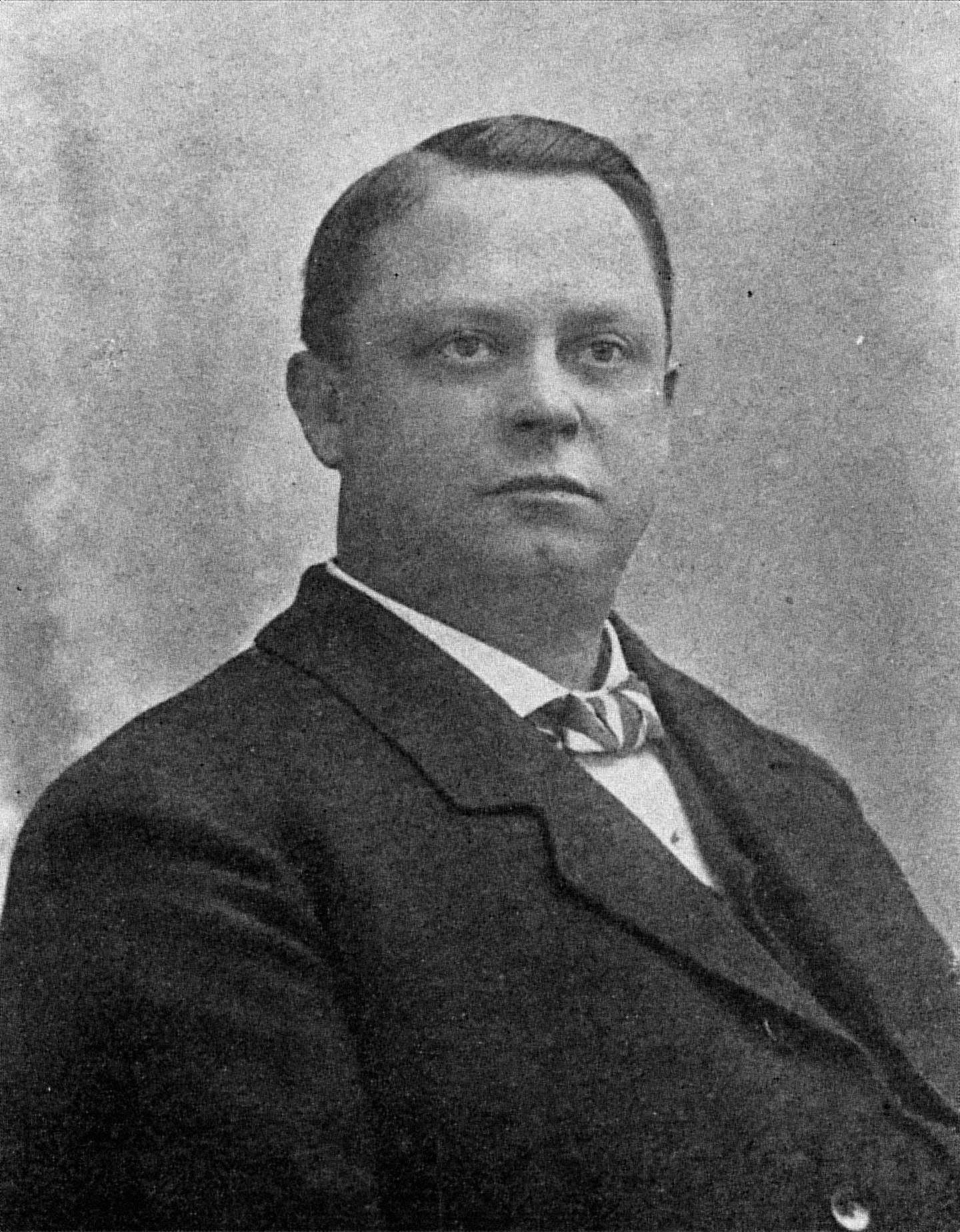

3rd North Dakota Secretary of State
- In office 1897–1900
- Governor: Frank A. Briggs; Joseph M. Devine
- Preceded by: Christian M. Dahl
- Succeeded by: Edward F. Porter

Personal details
- Born: Fred Falley; July 1, 1859 York, Illinois
- Died: 1907
- Party: Republican
- Spouse: Clara Falley

Fred Falley (1859–1907) was a North Dakota Republican Party politician who served as the 3rd Secretary of State of North Dakota from 1897 to 1900. He first won election to the Secretary of State position in 1896, and served until 1900 when he did not seek re-election.

== Biography ==
Fred Falley was born on July 1, 1859, in York, Illinois. He went to school in Illinois and Wisconsin. He learned the newspaper printing trade in Lancaster, Wisconsin. In 1880, he moved to Wahpeton, Dakota Territory, and was employed as a printer until 1883. In 1883, Fred Falley established the Sargent County Teller newspaper in Milnor, North Dakota. He ran the newspaper until 1887 when he sold it and purchased the North Dakota Globe in Wahpeton, North Dakota.

In 1885, Fred Falley married Clara Mitchell in Lancaster, Wisconsin. The couple had one son, Richard M. Falley. Clara Falley died in 1893. Fred Falley remarried in 1896 to Mrs. S. R. Pyatt in Wahpeton, North Dakota, and they had one son. On December 28, 1907, Falley died while visiting Minneapolis.

Preceded by Christian M. Dahl	Secretary of State of North Dakota; 1897–1900	Succeeded by Edward F. Porter
