= James D. Gronna =

American politician (1884–1963)

9th North Dakota Secretary of State
- In office 1935–1940
- Governor: Walter Welford; William Langer; John Moses
- Preceded by: Robert Byrne
- Succeeded by: Herman Thorson

Personal details
- Born: August 7, 1884
- Died: May 11, 1963 (aged 78) Grand Forks, North Dakota
- Party: Republican

James D. Gronna (August 7, 1884 – May 11, 1963) was a North Dakota Republican Party politician.

== Biography ==
His father was US Senator Asle Gronna and his mother was Bertha M. Gronna. James D. Gronna served as the Secretary of State of North Dakota from 1935 to 1940. He first won election to the position in 1934, and served until 1940 when he did not seek re-election. He died in Grand Forks, North Dakota at the age of 78 in 1963.

== Notes ==
Party political offices
Preceded by Robert Byrne	Republican nominee for North Dakota Secretary of State; 1934, 1936, 1938	Succeeded by Herman Thorson
Political offices
Preceded by Robert Byrne	Secretary of State of North Dakota; 1935–1940	Succeeded by Herman Thorson
