= North Dakota Secretary of State =

Elected office in the US state of North Dakota

- Seal of North Dakota

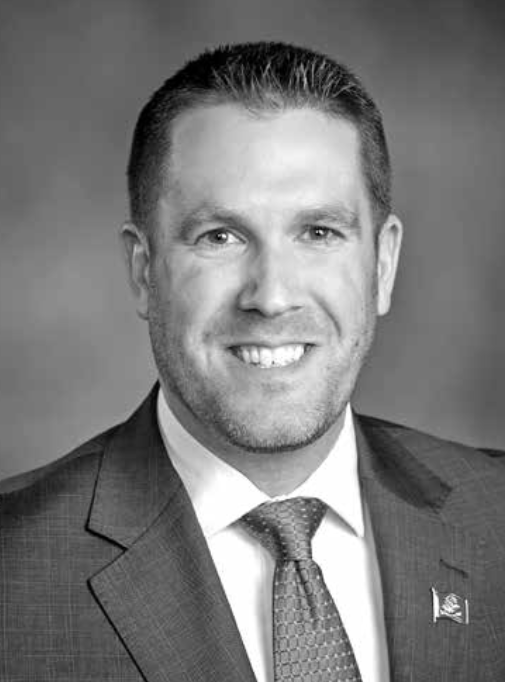
- Incumbent; Michael Howe since January 2023
- Term length: 4 years
- Formation: 1889
- First holder: John Flittie
- Succession: Second
- Website: sos.nd.gov

The North Dakota secretary of state is an elected office in the U.S. state of North Dakota. The incumbent as of 2023 was Michael Howe. Duties of the secretary of state include being the custodian of the state's Great Seal and other official state documents, recording the official acts of the governor, distributing copies of legislative resolutions, and recording original bills and resolutions from each biennial Legislative Assembly. Other duties of the office include those pertaining to statewide elections, licensing within the state, and recording trademarks. The secretary of state is second (behind the lieutenant governor) in the line of succession to the office of Governor of North Dakota.

== History ==
From the creation of the office with the state's constitution in 1889, to 2015 there had been 13 secretaries of state, the least number among any of the state offices created in that year. This is attributed to the 34-year tenure of Ben Meier, which as of 2015 was the longest of any state-level secretary of state in the US. As of 2015 the office had been held by the North Dakota Republican Party at all times except the period 1989 to 1992, when the state's Democratic Party was in office. The secretary of state originally served a two-year term, but this was extended to four in 1964 by a constitutional amendment.

== List of secretaries of state ==
The following is a list of secretaries of state of North Dakota.

Secretaries of state by party affiliation
Party	Secretaries
Republican	14
Democratic-NPL	1

#	Image	Name	Term	Party
1		John Flittie	1889–1892	Republican
2		Christian M. Dahl	1893–1896	Republican
3		Fred Falley	1897–1900	Republican
4		Edward F. Porter	1901–1906	Republican
5		Alfred Blaisdell	1907–1910	Republican
6		Patrick D. Norton	1911–1912	Republican
7		Thomas Hall	1913–1924	Republican/NPL
8		Robert Byrne	1925–1934	Republican
9		James D. Gronna	1935–1940	Republican/NPL
10		Herman Thorson	1941–1942	Republican
11		Thomas Hall	1943–1954	Republican
12		Ben Meier	1955–1988	Republican
13		Jim Kusler	1989–1992	Democratic-NPL
14		Alvin Jaeger	1993–2023	Republican
15		Michael Howe	2023–present	Republican

== See also ==
- List of company registers
