= John Flittie =

American politician

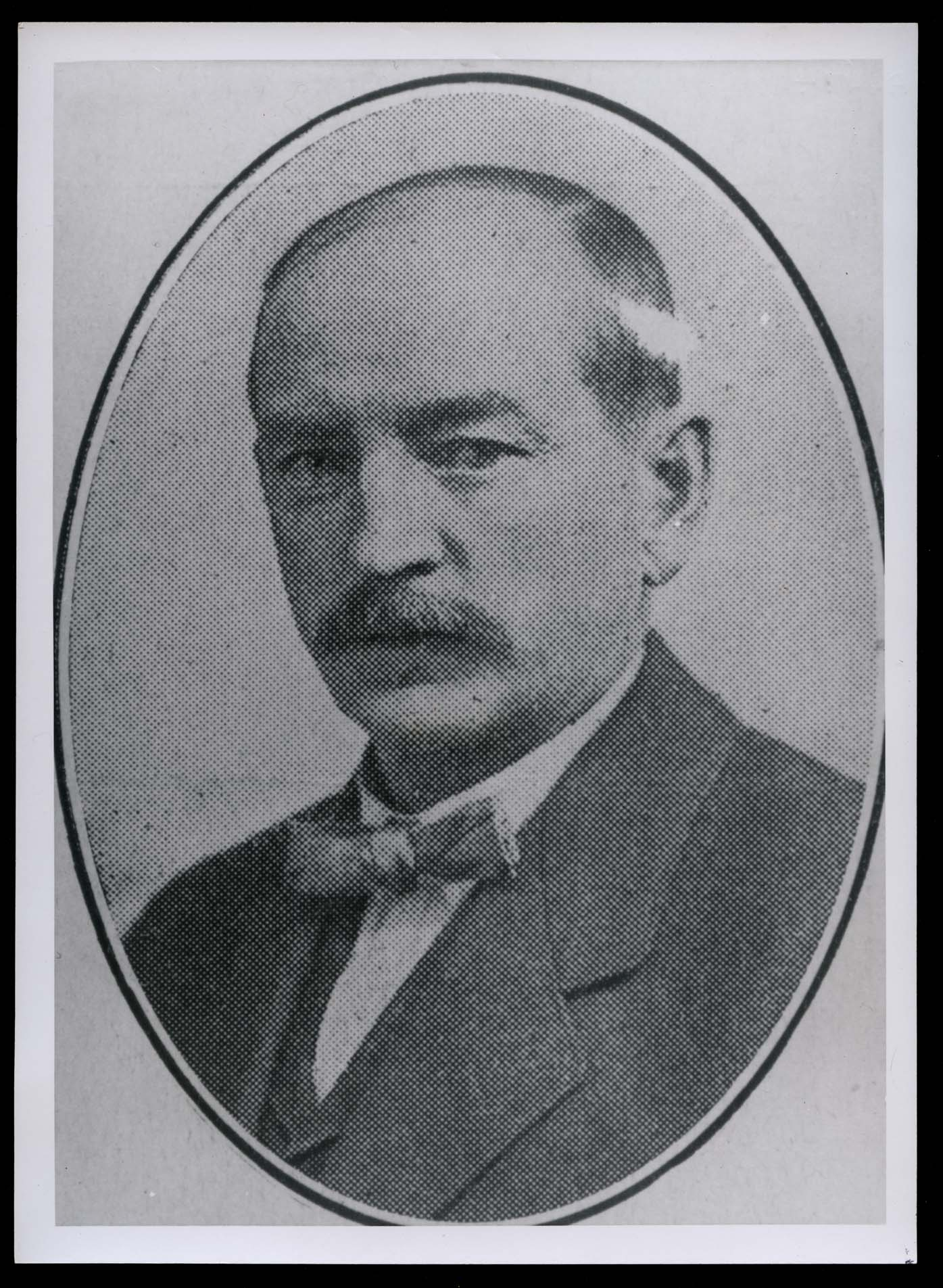
Flittie in 1911

John Flittie (March 22, 1856 – January 21, 1913) was a U.S. politician who served as North Dakota's first Secretary of State from 1889 to 1892.

Johan Flittie was born in Lesja Municipality in Oppland, Norway. He was the son of Johannes Throndson Flittie and Anna Johannesdotter Flittie. His family emigrated to North America in 1867, settling in Watonwan County, Minnesota. He graduated from Mankato Normal School (now Minnesota State University, Mankato) in 1878 and moved to Dakota Territory soon after. He was a member of the Dakota Territorial Council (the upper house of the territorial legislature) in 1885–1886, and won election as a Republican to the newly created office of Secretary of State in 1889. After serving an abbreviated 1-year term, he was re-elected to a full 2-year term in 1890. He did not seek re-election in 1892. He died in Williston, North Dakota.

== Notes ==
New office	Secretary of State of North Dakota; 1889–1892	Succeeded by Christian M. Dahl
