= Robert Byrne (North Dakota politician) =

American politician (1886–1967)

8th North Dakota Secretary of State
- In office January 1, 1925 – December 31, 1934
- Governor: Ragnvald Nestos; Arthur G. Sorlie; Walter Maddock; George F. Shafer; William Langer; Ole H. Olson
- Preceded by: Thomas Hall
- Succeeded by: James D. Gronna

Personal details
- Born: February 4, 1886
- Died: December 31, 1967 (aged 81) Bismarck, North Dakota
- Party: Republican (NPL faction)

Robert Byrne (February 4, 1886 – December 31, 1967) was a North Dakota Republican Party politician who served as the Secretary of State of North Dakota from 1925 to 1934. Byrne served in the North Dakota House of Representatives from 1917 to 1920, and in the North Dakota Senate from 1921 to 1924. He first won election to the Secretary of State position in 1924, and served until he was defeated by James D. Gronna in the 1934 Republican Primary.

In 1930, when the Capitol building was on fire, Byrne was able to save an original copy of the state Constitution from fire, suffering cuts and burns in the process.

He died in Bismarck, North Dakota at the age of 81 in 1967.

== Notes ==
Party political offices
Preceded by Thomas Hall	Republican nominee for North Dakota Secretary of State; 1924, 1926, 1928, 1930, 1932	Succeeded by James D. Gronna
Political offices
Preceded by Thomas Hall	Secretary of State of North Dakota; 1925–1934	Succeeded by James D. Gronna
