= Alfred Blaisdell =

American politician

5th North Dakota Secretary of State
- In office 1907–1910
- Governor: John Burke
- Preceded by: Edward F. Porter
- Succeeded by: Patrick D. Norton

Personal details
- Born: October 25, 1875
- Died: March 8, 1946 (aged 70)
- Party: Republican

Alfred Blaisdell (October 25, 1875 – March 8, 1946) was a North Dakota Republican Party politician who served as the Secretary of State of North Dakota from 1907 to 1910. He was first elected to the position in 1906, was re-elected in 1908, but did not seek re-election in 1910. His nephew, Josiah Blaisdell, Jr., served in the North Dakota Legislative Assembly during the 1930s.

Preceded by Edward F. Porter	Secretary of State of North Dakota; 1907–1910	Succeeded by Patrick D. Norton
