= Meridel Le Sueur =

American writer and social activist

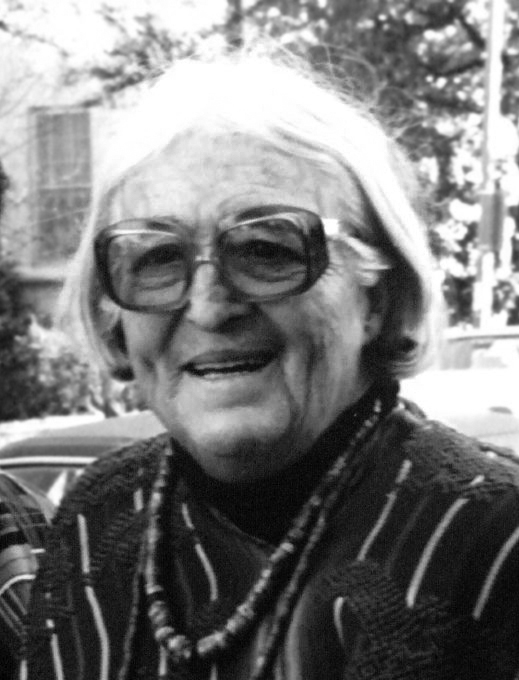
- Meridel Le Sueur at a writing workshop in Austin, Texas, 1980
- Born: Meridel Wharton; February 22, 1900; Murray, Iowa
- Died: November 14, 1996 (aged 96); Hudson, Wisconsin
- Education: American Academy of Dramatic Arts
- Occupations: Writer; actress; stuntwoman; journalist
- Movement: Proletarian literature
- Spouse: Harry Rice
- Children: Rachel (b. 1928) and Deborah (b. 1930)
- Parent(s): William Winston Wharton, Marian "Mary Del" Lucy; stepfather, Arthur LeSueur

Meridel Le Sueur (February 22, 1900 – November 14, 1996) was an American writer associated with the proletarian literature movement of the 1930s and 1940s. Born as Meridel Wharton, she assumed the name of her mother's second husband, Arthur Le Sueur, the former Socialist mayor of Minot, North Dakota. Her writings—including journalistic pieces, short stories, and poetry—often dealt with the everyday lives of working-class women. She wrote from a perspective shaped by Marxist and feminist ideas. Her best-known works include the 1932 essay “Women on the Breadlines” and the novel The Girl. Le Sueur’s close association with Communist organizations eventually led to her being blacklisted in the 1950s during the Cold War. This sharply reduced the amount of work she was able to publish. Interest in her work revived in the 1970s and 1980s, when scholars and second-wave feminists reassessed her contributions to American radical and feminist literature.

== Early life and activist family ==
Meridel Le Sueur was born in Murray, Iowa, on February 22, 1900, to William Winston Wharton and Marian “Mary Del” Lucy, both of whom were involved in social and political reform movements that often required the family to relocate. Following the divorce from Meridel’s biological father, Marian married Arthur Le Sueur, an influential socialist lawyer and ex-Socialist mayor of Minot, North Dakota. Arthur was instrumental in the Non-Partisan League and the Farmer-Labor Party. Marian Le Sueur continued her activism as a socialist, feminist, and a delegate for the Women’s Christian Temperance Union (WCTU). Her grandfather was a supporter of the Protestant fundamentalist temperance movement, and she "grew up among the radical farmer and labor groups ... like the Populists, the Farmers' Alliance and the Wobblies, the Industrial Workers of the World." Le Sueur was heavily influenced by poems and stories that she heard from Native American women.

== Young adulthood and early career ==
Starting in her late teens, Le Sueur began writing for liberal and left-leaning newspapers, addressing issues such as unemployment, migrant labor, and Native American autonomy. Her early journalism reflected both her political awareness and her interest in the everyday struggles of working people, themes that would remain central throughout her career.

In the years following high school, Le Sueur continued exploring artistic and political worlds beyond the Midwest. "After a year studying dance and physical fitness at the American College of Physical Education in Chicago, Illinois, Meridel moved to New York City, where she lived in an anarchist commune with Emma Goldman and studied at the American Academy of Dramatic Arts." Her acting career primarily took place in California, where she worked in Hollywood as an extra in The Perils of Pauline and Last of the Mohicans, and as a stuntwoman in silent movies. Although she would not continue acting, it expanded her interest in the telling of stories and creative work.

By the mid-1920s, she began writing for liberal and left-leaning newspapers on topics such as unemployment, migrant labor, and rights of Native Americans. It was during this period that she also joined the Communist Party, reflecting a deepening alignment with working-class politics. Sometime in the late 1920s or early 1930s, Le Sueur returned to the Midwest and settled in Minnesota. She was a contributor to New Masses and The Daily Worker. Her pieces focused on labor, poverty, and the everyday struggles of working people. These articles marked the beginning of her writing career. Her early journalism combined firsthand political involvement with a storytelling style shaped by her activist upbringing, establishing her as an emerging voice in Depression-era writing.

In the late 1940s and early 1950s, she taught writing classes in her mother's home on Dupont Avenue near Douglas Avenue in Minneapolis. She was something of a magnet for aspiring writers, drawing students from as far as New York City. She lived in the Twin Cities for some time.

== Major works and critical themes ==
Le Sueur wrote many notable books throughout her life, gaining recognition during the 1930s. On May 24, 1936, when New York Times editor Edward O’Brien published his yearly collection of best short stories, he included sixteen of Le Sueur's published short stories as either a citation or as a reprint. Her essay "I Was Marching" was reprinted three times. Her book Salute to Spring was shown in the International Publishers imprint during the 1940s, which included twelve pieces of both fiction and journalism. She also wrote several popular children's books, including the biographies "Nancy Hanks of Wilderness Road", "The Story of Davy Crockett"", "The Story of Johnny Appleseed", and "Sparrow Hawk". "A Story of Abraham Lincoln's Mother", one of her earliest children's books, was published in 1949. Composed of poetry, it focused on the dull life of a young girl named Billie Jo living through the bleakness of Oklahoma in the 1930s. Because her communist political views shaped much of her literary work, the Cold War climate and its repression of radical writers forced Le Sueur to withdraw from public life and take her work underground since many of her publishing outlets were shut down. It wasn’t until the end of the 1960s that her work became visible again thanks to a better political climate and the start of the new women’s movement. A few pieces of her work were reissued in the 1970s under the title Corn Village.

=== Women on the Breadlines ===
Women on the Breadlines was Le Sueur’s first piece written for the publication New Masses in 1932. The piece documents the realities of the nearly three million women who were unemployed during the Great Depression. During the Great Depression, there were long lines of people waiting for free food, known as breadlines. Le Sueur observed that underprivileged women typically avoided these lines in order to protect their image and hide their poverty. They avoided the breadlines by pooling together their resources, selling their possessions and/or their bodies, and/or applying for relief, which was seen as humiliating for many during this time.

Le Sueur’s writing style outlines the economic and psychological effects of their situation. She includes distinctive images such as women surviving on bacon rinds and potato peelings, or a very tired woman described in the conclusion of the story whose body shows signs of a significantly laborious life. The editors of New Masses criticized "Women on the Breadlines," describing it as having a defeatist tone. Editors urged her to depict more revolutionary and opportunistic events that were offered by unemployment councils. Despite this criticism, Le Sueur continued to view her portrayal of suffering not as pessimism, but as solidarity. "Woman on the Breadlines" has since been widely accepted as an early example of Le Sueur’s political devotion to giving voices to the struggling working-class women.

=== The Girl ===
One of her best known books, the novel The Girl, was first written in 1939 but not published until 1978. When Le Suer had first brought the book to a publisher in 1939, they turned it down. Her book was then left in her daughter’s basement in Saint Paul until the West End Press publishing house published it. On June 8th, 1934, Le Sueur wrote in her journal about a meeting that had sparked her to write The Girl. The meeting was on the issue of eugenic sterilization, which showcased to her how class status affected the livelihood of a woman. She had encountered this issue during 1925 when a law was passed in Minnesota that made people get sterilized if they were faced with mental disabilities, even when the tests determining their mental status were not always accurate. People who were recognized as feeble-minded would then get placed under legal guardianship. Her stepfather was a lawyer and he defended those who were wrongfully labeled and tried to overturn the decisions through court.

Le Sueur based The Girl on stories from the women in the Workers Alliance organization. This book showcased the fight for reproductive rights for working-class women by arguing against eugenics. In one section, she compares women to a mimeograph, since eugenics spreads the idea that women are mindless individuals who are creating replicas of themselves. She exposes how society usually targets the women who are sexually active and socially underrepresented, and ultimately challenges the idea that eugenics promotes social welfare.

== Blacklisting and suppression ==
Following the end of World War II, the political climate of the United States saw an increase in blacklisting because of the hysteria surrounding the perceived threat of communism in the United States. Le Sueur joined the Communist Party in 1924. The Communist party “provided a political theory and a program of action to which she could commit herself while at the same time retaining the freedom to be critical.” Elaine Hedges, the editor of Le Sueur's collection of work Ripening, says that Le Sueur “was aware herself of the male orientation of the party.” While Le Sueur criticized the Communist party for its dismissal of women’s rights “communal solidarity” was still a cornerstone of Le Sueur’s work.

Le Sueur was one of the writers blacklisted during the 1950s. This forced Le Sueur to go underground with her work as she was cut off from publishing outlets. During this period, she published children’s books about American historical figures to sustain an income during a time when her political works prevented her work from being picked up by any outlets. Towards the end of the 1950s, she supplemented her income with various occupations such as working in garment sweatshops, and as a driver. At one point during Le Sueur’s blacklisting, she lived in a condemned bus in Santa Fe, California. The blacklisting of Le Sueur also delayed the publication of her novel, The Girl, in which one character was a Communist party organizer.

== Legacy and influence ==
Le Sueur has become a major figure in feminist literary studies, labor history, and American cultural scholarship. According to a literary scholar, Constance Coiner, Le Sueur's work plays a major role in Marxist feminist literature because Le Sueur centered class struggle, women in labor, and left-wing politics. Le Sueur's work, especially her novel The Girl (1939), has also received attention in contemporary feminist scholarship. Jolene Hubbs argues that the novel’s representation of class inequality, control over women’s bodies, as well as reproductive injustice anticipate later intersectional feminist analyses of structural oppression. Because of these themes, The Girl is often included in women’s studies and American literature as an early example of feminist social critique.

Le Sueur’s reputation continued expanding during late 20th century. In 1982, The Feminist Press reissued her work, Ripening: Selected Work 1927-1980. The collection's editor, Elaine Hedges, wrote that Le Sueur’s work documented women’s daily lives and labor activism. This contributed to a new interest in her work during the second wave of feminist movement.

Le Sueur has also received recognition for her contribution to American literary regionalism. Literary scholar Stephen Schleuning described Le Sueur as playing a major role in "new regionalism" that centered on working-class communities, gendered experiences, and the political culture of the Midwest, an interpretation that led to critical discussions of regional writing and proletarian literature.

== Selected works ==
- 1930s The Girl, novel
- 1940 Salute to Spring, short stories
- 1945 North Star Country, History of Minnesota.
- 1949 Nancy Hanks of Wilderness Road: A Story of Abraham Lincoln's Mother, children's book ISBN 9780930100360
- 1951 Chanticleer of Wilderness Road: A Story of Davy Crockett, children's book
- 1954 The River Road: A Story of Abraham Lincoln, children's book ISBN 9780930100377
- 1954 Little Brother of the Wilderness: The Story of Johnny Appleseed, children's book
- 1955 Crusaders: The Radical Legacy of Marian and Arthur LeSueur New York : Blue Heron Press, ISBN 9780873511742
- 1973 Conquistadores
- 1974 Mound Builders
- 1975 Rites of Ancient Ripening, poems
- 1975 My people and my home (16 mm film, available on DVD - reissued 1990). Twin Cities Women's Film Collective. 1975. OCLC 500291129.
- 1982 O.K. Baby
- 1984 I Hear Men Talking and Other Stories ISBN 9780931122378
- 1984 Word is movement: journal notes; Atlanta, Tulsa, Wounded Knee. Tulsa, OK: Cardinal Press. 1984. ISBN 9780943594071.
- 1985 Interview. Meridel Le Sueur is interviewed by Allan Francovich (Film). OCLC 85824580.
- 1987 Sparrow Hawk, children's book ISBN 9780930100223
- 1991 The dread road. Albuquerque: West End Press. 1991. ISBN 9780931122637.
- 1990 Harvest song: collected essays and stories. [Albuquerque, N.M.]: West End Press. 31 December 1990. ISBN 9780931122606.
- 1993 Ripening: Selected Work, edited by Elaine Hedges, The Feminist Press. ISBN 9780935312416
- 1992 Women and spirituality (VHS tape). Meridel LeSueur, Carol Ann Russell, Rachel Tilsen, and Neala Schleuning speak at the 1992 Women and spirituality conference held at Mankato State University Oct. 10-11, 1992. OCLC 27648640.
- 1997 The dread road: a radio drama. Neon Crow Theatre Lab. OCLC 82999160.

== Quotes ==
- "When the workers send for you, then you know you're really good. Sometimes they would send money to pay the bus fare."
- "I tell the young writers who visit: 'Carry a notebook. That is the secret of a radical writer. Write it down as it is happening.'"
