= Christian M. Dahl =

American politician

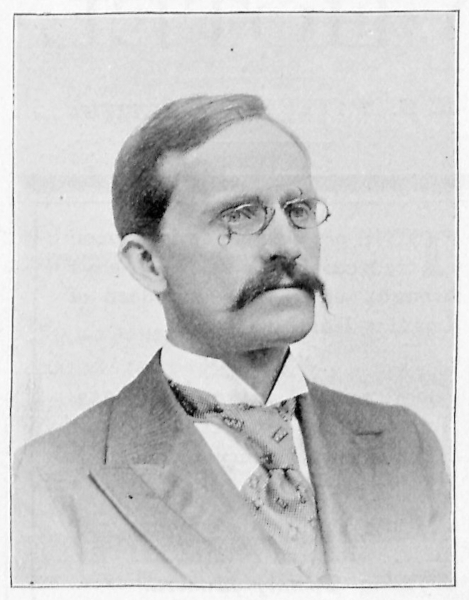

2nd North Dakota Secretary of State
- In office 1893–1896
- Governor: Eli C. D. Shortridge; Roger Allin
- Preceded by: John Flittie
- Succeeded by: Fred Falley

Personal details
- Born: August 21, 1856; Norway
- Died: August 4, 1923; North Dakota
- Political party: Republican
- Spouse: Helen Hanchett

Christian M. Dahl (August 21, 1856 – August 4, 1923) was a North Dakota Republican Party politician who served as the 2nd Secretary of State of North Dakota from 1893 to 1896.

Christian M. Dahl was an immigrant from Norway. He first won election to the Secretary of State position in 1892, and served until 1896 when he did not seek re-election. He was married to Helen Hanchett, the daughter of George Edwin Hanchett and Elizabeth (Oakley) Hanchett. He died at the age of 67 and was buried at Fairview Cemetery in Bismarck, North Dakota.

== Notes ==
Preceded by John Flittie	Secretary of State of North Dakota; 1893–1896	Succeeded by Fred Falley
