= Ben Meier =

American politician

12th North Dakota Secretary of State
- In office January 1, 1955 – December 31, 1988
- Governor: Norman Brunsdale; John E. Davis; William L. Guy; Art Link; Allen I. Olson; George A. Sinner
- Preceded by: Thomas Hall
- Succeeded by: Jim Kusler

Personal details
- Born: August 1, 1918 Napoleon, North Dakota
- Died: October 2, 1995 (aged 77) Bismarck, North Dakota
- Party: Republican

Ben Meier (August 1, 1918 – October 2, 1995) was a North Dakota Republican Party politician who served as the Secretary of State of North Dakota for a record tenure of 34 years from January 1, 1955, to December 31, 1988. This tenure makes him the second longest serving state level Secretary of State in United States history. Bill Gardner of New Hampshire, who served for 54 years, from 1976 to 2022, surpassed Meier's record on December 9, 2010.

== Biography ==
Ben Meier was born in Napoleon, North Dakota on August 1, 1918. He was educated in Logan County rural schools, and he received his high school education by correspondence. He attended Dakota Business College, and the School of Banking of the University of Wisconsin–Madison. He worked at banks in Napoleon, Gackle, and Hazelton from 1943 until 1950. While working in Hazelton, he was the owner of the bank. He moved to Bismarck in the early 1950s and worked with insurance, banking, and real estate. He also became involved in state politics when he was first elected as the North Dakota Secretary of State in 1954. Until his departure from office on December 31, 1988, he served a total of 34 years in the position which made him the longest serving state official in North Dakota's history. This record was later broken by Bruce Hagen, who served 39 years as a North Dakota Public Service Commissioner. His tenure made him the longest serving state level Secretary of State in United States history.

He was married to Clara Kaczyinski in 1944, who was a teacher. They had two sons; Lynn, who died while a medical student at the University of North Dakota in 1974, and Bernie. Meier died in Bismarck on October 2, 1995, at age 77, and his wife Clara is still residing in Bismarck.

== Notes ==
Party political offices
Preceded by Thomas Hall	Republican nominee for North Dakota Secretary of State; 1954, 1956, 1958, 1960, 1964, 1968, 1972, 1976, 1980, 1984	Succeeded by Dave Koland
Political offices
Preceded by Thomas Hall	Secretary of State of North Dakota; 1955–1988	Succeeded by Jim Kusler
