= Thomas Hall (North Dakota politician) =

American politician (1869–1958)

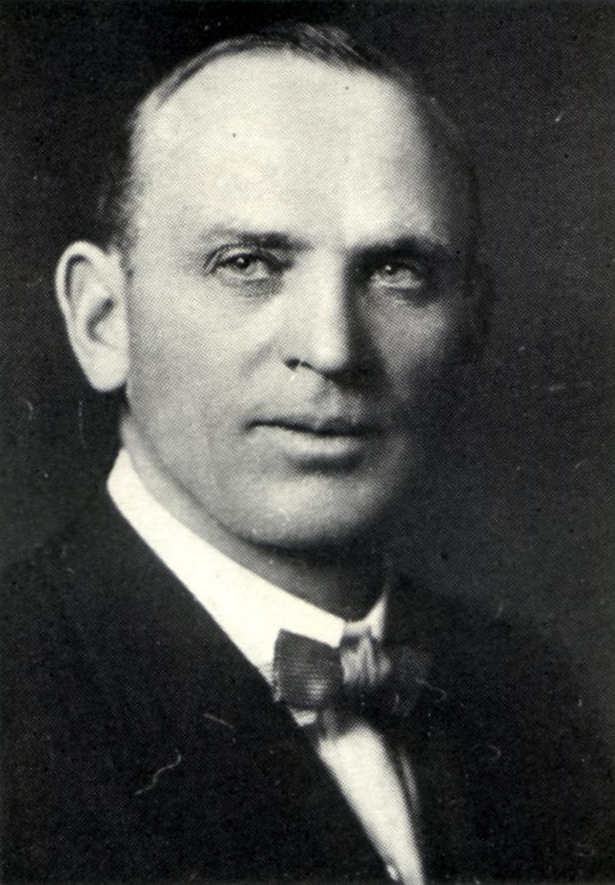
- Hall c. 1913

7th and 11th North Dakota Secretary of State
- In office 1943–1954
- Governor: John Moses; Fred G. Aandahl; Clarence Norman Brunsdale
- Preceded by: Herman Thorson
- Succeeded by: Ben Meier
- In office 1913–1924
- Governor: L. B. Hanna; Lynn Frazier; Ragnvald Nestos
- Preceded by: Patrick D. Norton
- Succeeded by: Robert Byrne

Member of the U.S. House of Representatives from North Dakota's 2nd district
- In office November 4, 1924 – March 3, 1933
- Preceded by: George M. Young
- Succeeded by: District abolished

Personal details
- Born: June 6, 1869 Cliff Mine, Michigan
- Died: December 4, 1958 (aged 89) Bismarck, North Dakota
- Party: Republican (NPL)

Thomas Hall (June 6, 1869 – December 4, 1958) was a United States Republican politician who served in the United States House of Representatives. He also served as the North Dakota Secretary of State for two different periods, each lasting 12 years.

== Biography ==
Thomas Hall was born in Cliff Mine, Michigan. He came to North Dakota with his parents in 1883, and was educated in Stutsman County schools and Concordia College in Moorhead, Minnesota. He served as the Secretary of State of North Dakota from 1913 to 1924. He was elected as a Republican to the United States House of Representatives from North Dakota to fill the vacancy caused by the resignation of George M. Young and served from November 4, 1924, to March 3, 1933. He was again Secretary of State of North Dakota from 1943 until 1954, when he retired. He was the oldest Secretary of State to serve the state when he left office at age 85. He died in Bismarck, North Dakota in 1958 at age 89.

=== Family ===
Hall was married to Anna M. Grafstein of Jamestown on September 1, 1897. She died on September 28, 1944. They had four children; Richard Hall, Lucille Blunt, Ellen Hornthal, and Edna Rumreich.

== Notes ==
Party political offices
Preceded by Alfred S. Dale	Democratic nominee for North Dakota Secretary of State; 1942	Vacant Title next held by Vernon B. Hathaway
Preceded by Herman Thorson	Republican nominee for North Dakota Secretary of State; 1944, 1946, 1948, 1950, 1952	Succeeded by Ben Meier
Political offices
Preceded by Patrick D. Norton	Secretary of State of North Dakota; 1913–1924	Succeeded by Robert Byrne
Preceded by Herman Thorson	Secretary of State of North Dakota; 1943–1954	Succeeded by Ben Meier
U.S. House of Representatives
Preceded by George M. Young	Member of the U.S. House of Representatives from North Dakota's 2nd congressional district 1924–1933	Succeeded by James H. Sinclair
