= James H. Sinclair =

American politician (1871–1943)

James Sinclair
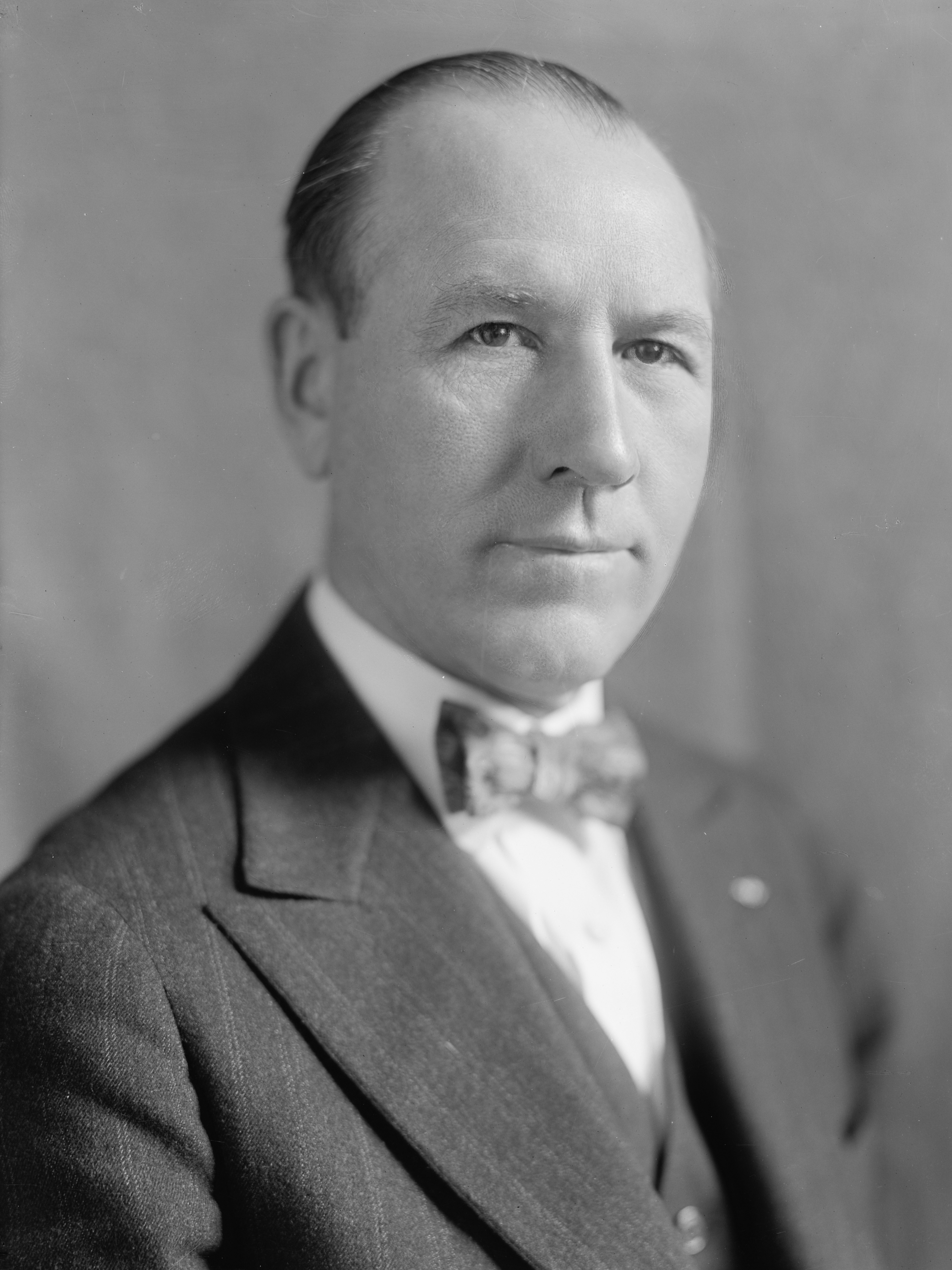
- Portrait by Harris & Ewing c. 1919–1933

Member of the U.S. House of Representatives from North Dakota
- In office March 4, 1919 – January 3, 1935
- Preceded by: Patrick Norton
- Succeeded by: Usher L. Burdick
- Constituency: 3rd district (1919–1933); At-large district (1933–1935)

Personal details
- Born: James Herbert Sinclair; October 9, 1871 St. Marys, Ontario, Canada
- Died: September 5, 1943 (aged 71) Miami, Florida, U.S.
- Party: Republican (NPL)

James Herbert Sinclair (October 9, 1871 – September 5, 1943) was American farmer and politician of the Republican Party and Nonpartisan League who served in the United States House of Representatives from 1919 to 1933.

He was born near St. Marys, Ontario, Canada and moved to Dakota Territory in 1883. He was elected to North Dakota's State House of Representatives, serving from 1915 to 1919.

== Sources ==
- United States Congress. "James H. Sinclair (id: S000442)". Biographical Directory of the United States Congress.

U.S. House of Representatives
Preceded by Patrick D. Norton	Member of the U.S. House of Representatives from North Dakota's 3rd congressional district 1919 – 1933	Succeeded by none (seat lost by reapportionment)
Preceded by Thomas Hall (1st) and Olger B. Burtness (2nd)	Member of the U.S. House of Representatives from North Dakota's at-large congressional district with William Lemke; 1933 – 1935	Succeeded by Usher L. Burdick
