= North Dakota's 3rd congressional district =

Coordinates: 47°40′N 101°25′W

- Obsolete district
- Created: 1910
- Eliminated: 1930
- Years active: 1913-1933

North Dakota's 3rd congressional district is an obsolete congressional district in the state of North Dakota that was created by reapportionments in 1913, and eliminated by the reapportionments of the 1930 census in 1933. The district consisted of the western part of the state, and was made up of following counties: Divide, Burke, Renville, Ward, Mountrail, Williams, McKenzie, McLean, Dunn, Mercer, Oliver, Billings, Stark, Morton, Hettinger, Bowman and Adams.

The seat was only filled by two congressmen during its existence; Patrick Daniel Norton and James H. Sinclair.

== List of members representing the district ==
Member	Party	Years	Cong ress	Electoral history
District established March 4, 1913
Patrick Daniel Norton (Hettinger)	Republican	March 4, 1913 – March 3, 1919	63rd 64th 65th	Elected in 1912. Re-elected in 1914. Re-elected in 1916. Retired.
James H. Sinclair (Kenmare)	Republican	March 4, 1919 – March 3, 1933	66th 67th 68th 69th 70th 71st 72nd	Elected in 1918. Re-elected in 1920. Re-elected in 1922. Re-elected in 1924. Re-elected in 1926. Re-elected in 1928. Re-elected in 1930. Redistricted to the at-large district.
District dissolved March 4, 1933

== Election results ==
Year	Candidate	Party	Votes	%
1912 (63rd Congress)	Patrick Daniel Norton	Republican	12,935	50.7
1912 (63rd Congress)	Hal Halvorsen	Democratic	7,306	28.7
1912 (63rd Congress)	Arthur LeSueur	Socialist	5,254	20.6
1914 (64th Congress)	Patrick Daniel Norton	Republican	15,547	57.1
1914 (64th Congress)	Halvor Halvorsen	Democratic	7,394	27.2
1914 (64th Congress)	S. Griffith	Socialist	3,791	13.9
1916 (65th Congress)	Patrick Daniel Norton	Republican	20,393	65.2
1916 (65th Congress)	Charles Simon	Democratic	8,293	26.5
1916 (65th Congress)	Anton Klemmens	Socialist	2,586	8.3
1918 (66th Congress)	James H. Sinclair	Republican	17,564	66.2
1918 (66th Congress)	Halvor Halvorson	Democratic	8,951	33.8
1920 (67th Congress)	James H. Sinclair	Republican	41,409	62.9
1920 (67th Congress)	R. A. Johnson	Democratic	24,460	37.1
1922 (68th Congress)	James H. Sinclair	Republican	33,499	64.2
1922 (68th Congress)	E. J. Hughes	Democratic	18,672	35.8
1924 (69th Congress)	James H. Sinclair	Republican	37,925	73.4
1924 (69th Congress)	R. A. Johnson	Democratic	13,730	26.6
1926 (70th Congress)	James H. Sinclair	Republican	42,923	87.8
1926 (70th Congress)	Reuben H. Leavitt	Democratic	5,960	12.2
1928 (71st Congress)	James H. Sinclair	Republican	52,220	84.8
1928 (71st Congress)	Reuben H. Leavitt	Democratic	9,335	15.2
1930 (72nd Congress)	James H. Sinclair	Republican	50,917	77.8
1930 (72nd Congress)	Reuben H. Leavitt	Democratic	12,296	18.8
1930 (72nd Congress)	Andrew Omholt	Communist	2,234	3.4
