= Patrick Norton (American politician) =

American politician (1876–1953)

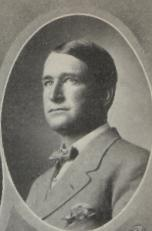

Member of the U.S. House of Representatives from North Dakota's 3rd district
- In office March 4, 1913 – March 3, 1919
- Preceded by: District created
- Succeeded by: James H. Sinclair

6th North Dakota Secretary of State
- In office 1911–1912
- Governor: John Burke
- Preceded by: Alfred Blaisdell
- Succeeded by: Thomas Hall

Personal details
- Born: Patrick Daniel Norton; May 17, 1876 Ishpeming, Michigan, U.S.
- Died: October 14, 1953 (aged 77) Minot, North Dakota, U.S.
- Party: Republican
- Education: University of North Dakota (BA, LL.B)

Patrick Daniel Norton (May 17, 1876 – October 14, 1953) was an American politician who served as a member of the United States House of Representatives from 1913 to 1919, representing North Dakota's 3rd congressional district as a member of the Republican Party.

== Early life and education ==
Born in Ishpeming, Michigan, Norton moved with his parents to Ramsey County, North Dakota in 1883 where he attended public schools. He graduated from the University of North Dakota in 1897, and studied law at the University of North Dakota School of Law.

== Career ==
Norton was admitted to the State Bar Association of North Dakota in 1903 and began his own legal practice in Devils Lake, North Dakota. He served as the superintendent of the schools of Ramsey County from 1905 to 1907, and as the Chief Clerk of the North Dakota House of Representatives in 1907 and 1908. He moved to Hettinger, North Dakota, in 1907 and served as prosecuting attorney of Adams County from 1907 to 1911. He became known as a statewide politician when he served as Secretary of State of North Dakota from 1911 to 1912.

Norton was elected as a Republican to the 63rd, 64th, and 65th Congresses (March 4, 1913 – March 3, 1919). He opted not to seek re-election in 1918. After leaving the House, he moved to Mandan, North Dakota in 1919 and engaged in farming, livestock raising, banking, and the practice of law. He served as the National bank receiver at Brookings, South Dakota. from 1924 to 1927. He moved to Minot, North Dakota in 1927, and served as delegate to the 1928 Republican National Convention.

== Personal life ==
Norton was married to Louise Fitzgerald, with whom he had two sons and several grandchildren.

== Sources ==
- United States Congress. "Patrick Norton (id: N000156)". Biographical Directory of the United States Congress.

Political offices
Preceded by Alfred Blaisdell	Secretary of State of North Dakota; 1911–1912	Succeeded by Thomas Hall
U.S. House of Representatives
Preceded by none	Member of the U.S. House of Representatives from North Dakota's 3rd congressional district 1913 – 1919	Succeeded by James H. Sinclair
