= Norwegian Dakotan =

American of Norwegian ancestry in Dakota

Norskamerikanere i Dakota

Total population
- 312,697; 21.4% of the Dakotan population

Regions with significant populations
- North Dakota: 199,154
- Fargo: 37,343
- Grand Forks: 17,438
- Bismarck: 13,095
- Minot: 10,945
- West Fargo: 8,839
- South Dakota: 113,543
- Sioux Falls: 26,630
- Rapid City: 7,584
- Watertown: 4,137
- Brookings: 4,082
- Aberdeen: 3,809

Languages
- North-Central American English, Norwegian

Religion
- Lutheran Christianity

Related ethnic groups
- Norwegian American

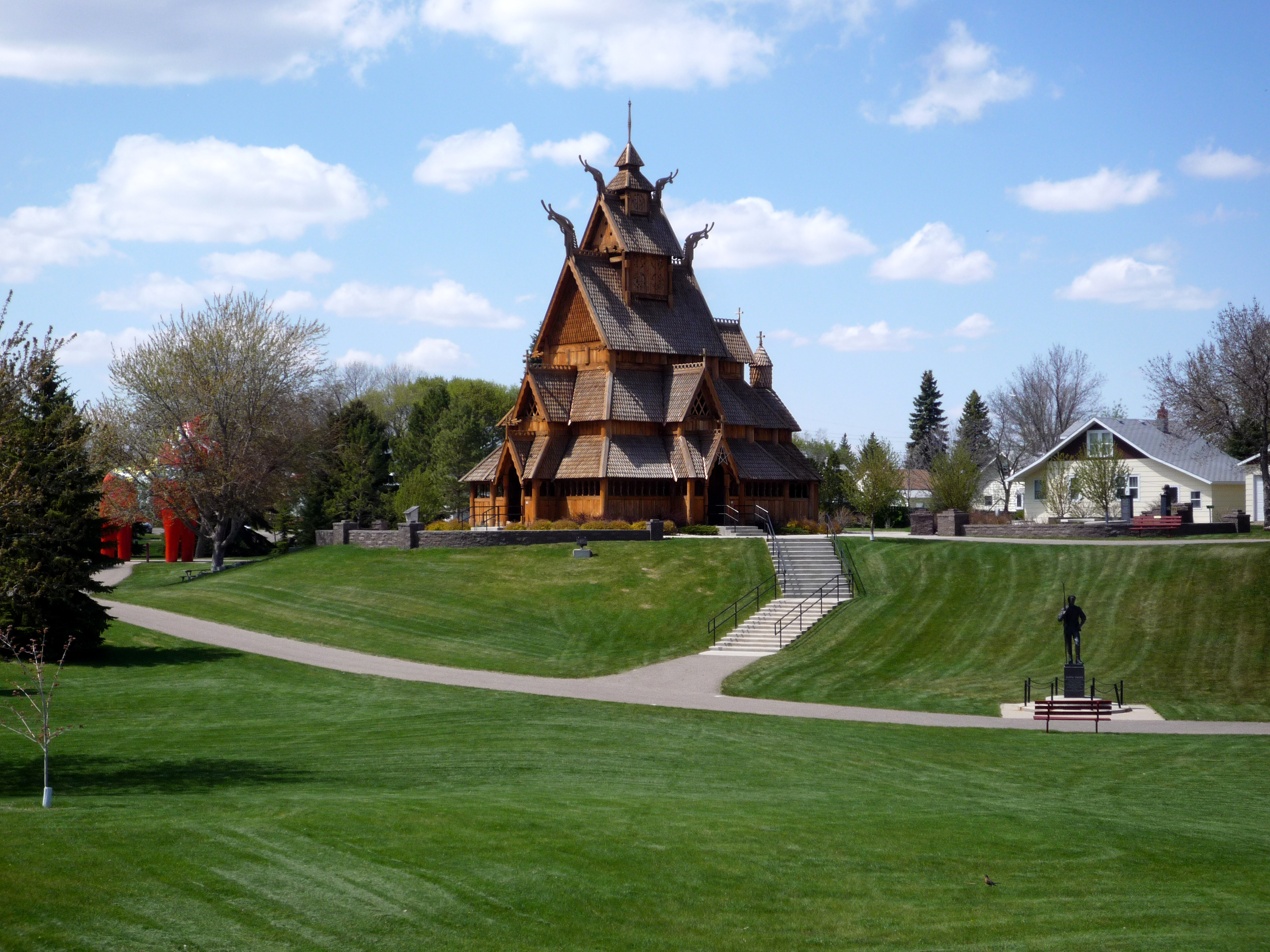
Scandinavian Heritage Park in Minot, North Dakota. 30.8% of the population in North Dakota is of Norwegian ancestry.

A Norwegian Dakotan is a Norwegian American (a person with Norwegian ancestry) in the U.S. states of North and South Dakota. One in three of all North Dakotans is of Norwegian heritage, which is the highest among all U.S. states. South Dakota is number three, behind Minnesota. The immigrants settled primarily between 1870 and 1920.

As of 2009, 312,697 Dakotans claim Norwegian ancestry, 21.4% of the region's population (30.8% of North Dakota's population and 14.0% of South Dakota's population), or 6.7% of the total Norwegian American population.

== History ==
=== Dakota Territory ===
Between 1803 and 1804 the land was acquired by the United States in the Louisiana Purchase. The region was called the Dakota territory. Before 1803–4, both North and South Dakota did not exist inside of the United States. After the Louisiana Purchase, the southwestern portion, drained by the Missouri River, became U.S. territory. However, the land drained by the Red and Mouse Rivers remained under British control. As the U.S. expanded westward, the region was gradually explored and settled by pioneers. The War of 1812 between the U.S. and Britain led to agreements that defined borders, bringing the northern region under U.S. control. In 1861, the Dakota Territory was formally established, including present-day North and South Dakota, as well as parts of Montana and Wyoming. Settlers moved into the region, attracted by farming opportunities and the transcontinental railroad. Native American tribes, particularly the Lakota Sioux, faced increasing pressure and were forced onto reservations following conflicts and treaties. In 1889, the Dakota Territory was split into North and South Dakota, both becoming U.S. states.

==== Scandinavian Influence ====
Scandinavians played a significant role in shaping North Dakota's early population, with Norwegians, Swedes, Danes, Icelanders, and Finns settling in the state—roughly in that order of prevalence. In their homelands, they had spent centuries competing for economic and political power, as close-knit nations often do. Despite their rivalries, they shared common linguistic roots, a strong Lutheran tradition, and a high level of literacy due to compulsory education in their countries. Most Scandinavian immigrants arriving in North Dakota were already literate, having received at least six years of schooling.

By 1910, North Dakota had a strong Scandinavian presence: Norwegians made up 21.3% of the population, Swedes 4.7%, Danes 2.2%, Icelanders 0.5%, and Finns 0.4%. By 1914, Norwegians alone owned about 20% of the state's farmland, primarily in the eastern, northwestern, and north-central regions. While some immigrants arrived directly from Scandinavia, most had first lived in Minnesota, Wisconsin, or Iowa before moving west.

The large number of churches scattered across North Dakota can be traced back to theological and reform conflicts within the state-sponsored Lutheran church in Scandinavia. Many towns ended up with multiple Lutheran churches, each founded by immigrants with slightly different beliefs.

Unlike Germans from Russia, who tended to maintain their language and customs for longer, Scandinavians quickly embraced English, and within a generation, they had established schools and hospitals that reflected their traditions. They also adapted swiftly to American political life, and by 1920, Norwegians, Swedes, Danes, and Icelanders held positions at every level of government, from townships to the state legislature.

=== Settlements ===
The first Norwegians arrived in the Dakotas as early as 1859, shortly after the treaty with the Yankton Sioux was signed July 10, 1859. It took another ten years before the greater influx of Norwegians took place.

==== North Dakota ====
Mike Jacobs of the Grand Forks Herald observed that two Governors of North Dakota (Ragnvald Nestos and John Moses) "were born in Norway, almost as good politically as being a native North Dakotan". Norwegian immigrants began arriving in North Dakota in the 1870s. They settled mainly in the eastern and northern parts of the state, but today they live most everywhere in the state. Because of the lack of farmland in Norway, the Norwegian immigrants sought the wonderful fertile farmland of North Dakota. Some of the immigrants had spent a few years in other states before they finally arrived in North Dakota. In 1880 the census recorded 8,814 Norwegians in North Dakota, and by 1900 there were 73,744.

==== Settlers from Telemark ====
Telemark settlers found their way to most of the major settlements in North Dakota in the late 1870s and early 1880s. In 1880, a band of people from Telemark, settled in the area of what is now Bue (named for the settlers' Norwegian home in Bø, Telemark) in Nelson County. Their main cash crop was wheat, and they soon found that raising cattle was also quite lucrative. The main markets were in Valley City and Grand Forks.

Sondre Norheim, Father of Modern Skiing, emigrated to North Dakota. On May 30, 1884, Sondre and Rannei left Norway together with three of their children– Anne (21), Åmund (14) and Talleiv (12). Their son Olav and daughter Hæge had left home previously, and their eldest daughter Ingerid, decided to stay back home. Norheim followed in the footsteps of many of his neighbors in Morgedal and immigrated to the United States. After having first settled in Minnesota, they moved to North Dakota, near Villard in McHenry County. He continued to ski when he could, though the climate and flat topography of the Dakota prairie offered few opportunities for downhill skiing. It was said he always had a pair of skis placed outside his door. Norheim grew more religious with age and helped build a Lutheran church in Villard. He died in 1897 and was buried in Denbigh, McHenry County, North Dakota.

==== South Dakota ====
According to the 1860 Census there were 129 Norwegians in South Dakota. That changed fast; in 1880 one-tenth of the population was Norwegian, and in 1889 one-third of the population were Norwegians. The towns of Roslyn and Pierpont were originally almost 100 percent Norwegian, but these are very small cities. South Dakota has had a number of Governors of Norwegian ancestry but the state's third governor, Niels Boe was born in Bergen, Norway in 1847 and came to Dakota with his parents as a young man. South Dakota's 19th governor, Sigurd Anderson was born at Frolands Verk near Arendal, Norway in 1904. He came to America several years later settling with his parents in Lincoln County, SD which has a large Norwegian population. Canton, SD was the original home of the Norwegian Lutheran, Augustana College which is today Augustana University located in Sioux Falls.

=== Influence ===
The immigrants from Norway (and the rest of Scandinavia) in the Dakotas have played an extremely important role in the development of the region. Few places in the United States have been so influenced by one ethnic group, and because Norwegians are a relatively small ethnic group, it makes it even more clear.

==== Cuisine ====
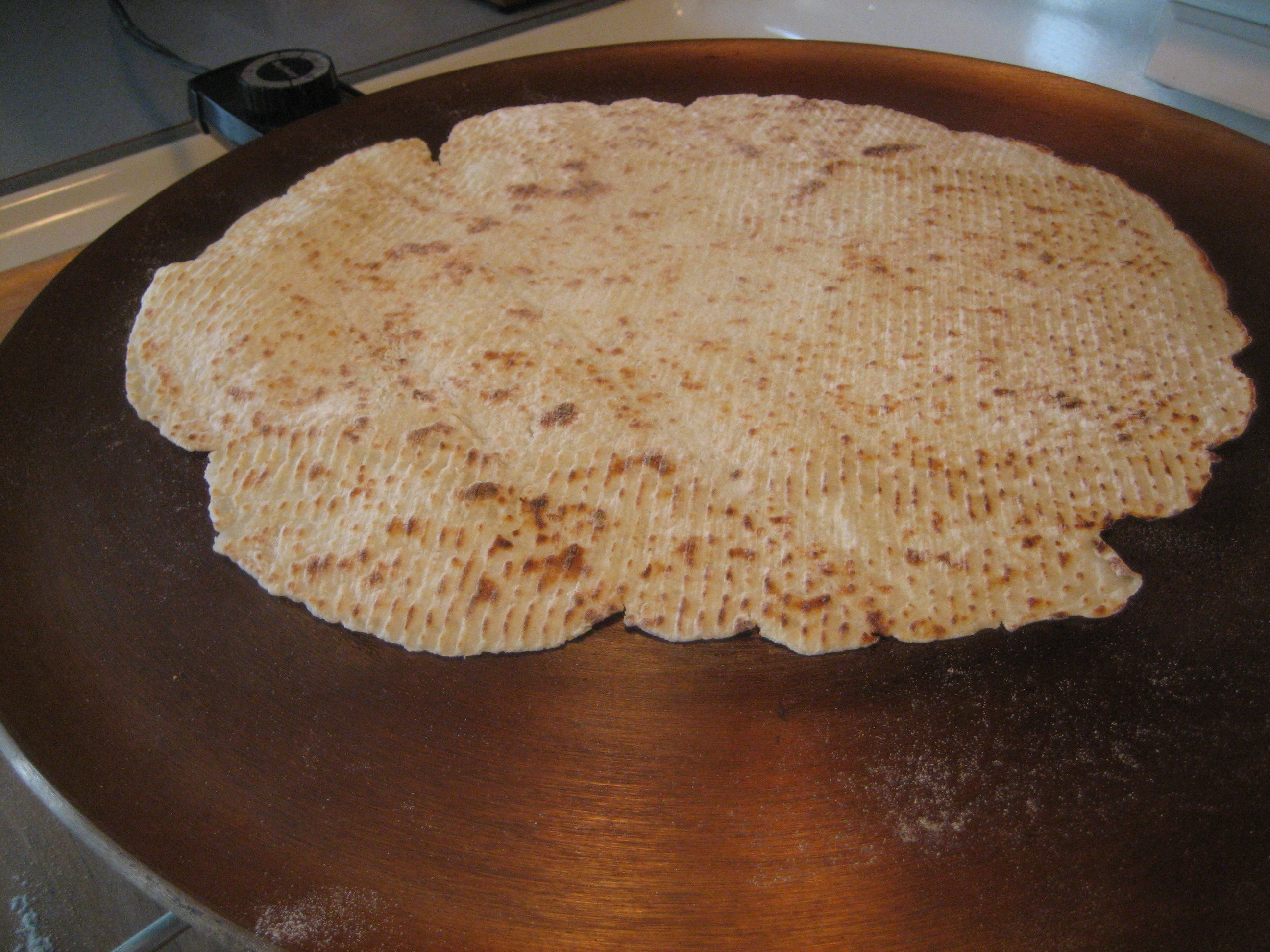
Lefse is a common and popular dish among Dakotans, not only for those with Norwegian ancestry.

Those who emigrated brought their food traditions, too. The Dakotas are, together with Minnesota, famous for their typical Scandinavian cuisine. Lefse, Krumkake, Lutefisk, and Raspeball/Komle/Klubb (called Potato Dumplings in the United States) is just some of the food traditions there, not only eaten by Norwegian American, but other people in the state.

Churches throughout the state commonly host annual fellowship dinners open to the community. Perhaps one of the largest authentic Norwegian dinners is the annual Lutefisk Dinner hosted by the First Lutheran Church, Williston, North Dakota, every February.

The largest Scandinavian Festival in North America is the annual Norsk Høstfest held every October, in Minot, North Dakota. This five-day cultural event features Scandinavian dishes, but does accommodate those who are not fond of lutefisk by providing German entrees.

==== Language ====
All of the Norwegians who came to the Dakotas spoke Norwegian, and the number of speakers grew with the immigration. Most of them learned English, or at least their children did. There were several Norwegian-language newspapers in the United States. But when the largest waves of immigration ended, in the 1920s, the number of Norwegian speakers decreased. That was because the second and third generation immigrants didn't learn Norwegian as a primary language, and it wasn't necessary because everyone spoke English.

However, some Norwegian words and phrases survived, but are no longer pronounced with a Norwegian accent, such as Uff da. As of 2005, 1,743 speak Norwegian as their primary language in North Dakota, which is only 0.2% of the population, and 1,097 are older than 65 years old. In South Dakota, 256 people speak Norwegian, and all of them are older than 65 years. These numbers are just for those who speak Norwegian as their primary language. The number who understand basic Norwegian is higher.

This is a list of Dakotan communities with the highest percentage of Norwegian speakers:

1. Northwood, North Dakota 4.41% (39 persons)
2. Mayville, North Dakota 3.56% (65 persons)
3. Crosby, North Dakota 2.81% (30 persons)
4. Velva, North Dakota 2.51% (24 persons)
5. Cooperstown, North Dakota 2.21% (23 persons)
6. Tioga, North Dakota 1.42% (15 persons)
7. Bottineau, North Dakota 1.35% (30 persons)
8. Lakota, North Dakota 1.33% (10 persons)
9. Stanley, North Dakota 1.16% (14 persons)
10. Williston, North Dakota 1.13% (134 persons)

This is a list of Dakotan counties with the highest percentage of Norwegian speakers:

1. Divide County, North Dakota 2.25% (49 persons)
2. Traill County, North Dakota 2.08% (165 persons)
3. Griggs County, North Dakota 2.02% (53 persons)
4. Nelson County, North Dakota 1.98% (70 persons)
5. Steele County, North Dakota 1.61% (34 persons)
6. Bottineau County, North Dakota 1.24% (85 persons)
7. Ransom County, North Dakota 1.18% (65 persons)
8. Walsh County, North Dakota 1.14% (133 persons)
9. Mountrail County, North Dakota 0.98% (60 persons)
10. McHenry County, North Dakota 0.95% (54 persons)

== Demographics ==
The number of Norwegian Americans is slightly increasing, as the population as a whole, and the percentage of Norwegian Americans in these areas is stable.

Year	Dakotans	Norwegian Dakotans	Percent of Dakotans	Norwegian Americans	Percent of Norwegian Americans
1980	1,343,485	283,260	21.0%	3,453,839	8.2%
1990	1,334,804	295,467	22.1%	3,869,395	7.6%
2000	1,397,044	308,450	22.0%	4,477,725	6.8%
2009	1,459,227	312,697	21.4%	4,642,526	6.7%

=== North Dakota ===
Norwegians in North Dakota are younger than the average population. 13.8% of the population is younger than 18 years old, while the state as a whole is 10.3%.

Of North Dakota's population in the year 2000 at 642,200, 193,158 said that they have Norwegian ancestry, or 30.0%. Of them 95,438 (49.4%) were male, and 97,720 (50.6%) were female. The median age was 35, in contrast to 36 for the whole North Dakotan population, 36.7 for the whole American population, and 39.4 for Norway's population.

Among Norwegians in North Dakota, 12,850 were younger than the age of 5 (or 6.6% of all those with Norwegian ancestry); of the whole North Dakotan population, 39,094 were younger than the age of 5 (or 6.0% of all North Dakotans). Among Norwegian North Dakotans, 13,890 were between 5 and 17 years of age (or 7.1% of all those with Norwegian ancestry), compared to 27,208 between 5 and 17 for the whole North Dakotan population (or 4.2% of all North Dakotans). Among the group, 141,371 were between 18 and 64 (or 73.1% of all Norwegian North Dakotans), compared to 481,301 between 18 and 64 for the whole North Dakotan population (or 74.9% of all North Dakotans). Among the group, 25,047 were older than 65 (or 12.9% of all those with Norwegian ancestry), compared to 94,597 older than 65 for the whole North Dakotan population (or 14.7% of all North Dakotans). Many people of Norwegian descent, particularly the older ones, still continue some traditions that mark them as related to Norway.

The household population number 188,363, when the group quarters population number 4,795. The average household size is 2, when the average family size is 3. Occupied housing units number 77,176; of them, owner-occupied housing units number 52,425 and renter-occupied housing units number 24,751.

119,393 are 25 years, or over. Of them, 105,733 are high school graduate or higher, and 30,129 bachelor's degree or higher. 16,391 is civilian veterans (civilian population 18 years and over). 25,329 has disability status (population 5 years and over). 618 are foreign born. 42,265 is male, now married, except separated (population 15 years and over) and 43,213 is female, now married, except separated (population 15 years and over). Approximately 5,422 said they speak a language other than English at home (population 5 years and over).

104,400 are in labor force (population 16 years and over). Mean travel time to work in minutes (workers 16 years and over) is 16. Median household income in 1999 (dollars) were 36,006, while median family income in 1999 (dollars) were 46,170, per capita income in 1999 (dollars) were 18,249. Families below poverty level number 3,233, while individuals below poverty level number 17,570. Single-family owner-occupied homes number 37,688. Of them, median value (dollars) number 75,500, median of selected monthly owner costs is not applicable, with a mortgage (dollars) number 836, while not mortgaged (dollars) number 272.

=== South Dakota ===
Of South Dakota's population in the year 2000 at 754,844, 115,292 said that they have Norwegian ancestry, or 15.2%. Of them 56,361 (48.9%) were male, and 58,931 (51.1%) were female. The median age was 36, exactly the same as for the whole South Dakotan population, slightly lower with 36.7 for the whole American population, and lower with 39.4 for Norway's population.

Among Norwegians in South Dakota, 7,414 were younger than the age of 5 (or 6.4% of all those with Norwegian ancestry); of the whole South Dakotan population, 51,024 were younger than the age of 5 (or 6.7% of all South Dakotans). Among Norwegian South Dakotans, 8,027 were between 5 and 17 years of age (or 6.9% of all those with Norwegian ancestry), compared to 43,586 between 5 and 17 for the whole South Dakotan population (or 5.7% of all South Dakotans). Among the group, 83,830 were between 18 and 64 (or 72.7% of all Norwegian South Dakotans), compared to 481,301 between 18 and 64 for the whole South Dakotan population (or 73.1% of all South Dakotans). Among the group, 16,021 were older than 65 (or 13.8% of all those with Norwegian ancestry), compared to 108,116 older than 65 for the whole South Dakotan population (or 14.3% of all South Dakotans).

The household population number 112,480, when the group quarters population number 2,812. The average household size is 2, when the average family size is 3. Occupied housing units number 45,206; of them, owner-occupied housing units number 32,728 and renter-occupied housing units number 12,478.

71,963 are 25 years, or over. Of them, 64,874 are high school graduate or higher, and 18,155 bachelor's degree or higher. 10,926 is civilian veterans (civilian population 18 years and over). 14,749 has disability status (population 5 years and over). 258 are foreign born. 25,815 is male, now married, except separated (population 15 years and over) and 26,488 is female, now married, except separated (population 15 years and over). Approximately 2,562 said they speak a language other than English at home (population 5 years and over).

63,710 are in labor force (population 16 years and over). Mean travel time to work in minutes (workers 17 years and over) is 16. Median household income in 1999 (dollars) were 38,934, while median family income in 1999 (dollars) were 47,700, per capita income in 1999 (dollars) were 19,025. Families below poverty level number 1,584, while individuals below poverty level number 8,394. Single-family owner-occupied homes number 23,074. Of them, median value (dollars) number 83,000, median of selected monthly owner costs is not applicable, with a mortgage (dollars) number 838, while not mortgaged (dollars) number 285.

=== Norwegian communities in the Dakotas ===
The 25 Dakotan communities with the highest percentage of residents claiming Norwegian ancestry are (Those in bold are the largest in the state):

1. **Northwood, North Dakota 55.5%**
2. Crosby, North Dakota 52.3%
3. Mayville, North Dakota 48.5%
4. Cooperstown, North Dakota 46.6%
5. Tioga, North Dakota 45.7%
6. Stanley, North Dakota 42.4%
7. Lakota, North Dakota 39.2%
8. Velva, North Dakota 38.1%
9. Williston, North Dakota 37.6%
10. Hillsboro, North Dakota 37.3%
11. Park River, North Dakota 37.1%
12. Watford City, North Dakota 37.0%
13. New Rockford, North Dakota 34.4%
14. Williston, North Dakota 34.2%
15. Thompson, North Dakota 33.6%
16. Reeder, North Dakota 33.3%
17. Rugby, North Dakota 33.1%
18. Bottineau, North Dakota 32.1%
19. Garrison, North Dakota 31.8%
20. Horace, North Dakota 31.7%
21. Grafton, North Dakota 31.4%
22. Stanley, North Dakota 31.2%
23. Enderlin, North Dakota 30.8%
24. **Volga, South Dakota 30.3%**
25. Lisbon, North Dakota 30.2%

=== Norwegian counties in the Dakotas ===
The 25 Dakotan counties with the highest percentage of residents claiming Norwegian ancestry are (Those in bold are the largest in the state):

1. **Divide County, North Dakota 64.7%**
2. Steele County, North Dakota 62.0%
3. Traill County, North Dakota 59.0%
4. Griggs County, North Dakota 58.9%
5. Nelson County, North Dakota 54.8%
6. Burke County, North Dakota 53.1%
7. Williams County, North Dakota 48.2%
8. Eddy County, North Dakota 47.4%
9. Bottineau County, North Dakota 46.0%
10. Renville County, North Dakota 42.4%
11. Barnes County, North Dakota 40.8%
12. Walsh County, North Dakota 40.6%
13. Ransom County, North Dakota 39.3%
14. Pierce County, North Dakota 39.0%
15. Ramsey County, North Dakota 37.1%
16. Cass County, North Dakota 36.9%
17. Mountrail County, North Dakota 36.8%
18. Sargent County, North Dakota 36.5%
19. McHenry County, North Dakota 35.6%
20. **Marshall County, South Dakota 35.1%**
21. Grand Forks County, North Dakota 34.9%
22. McKenzie County, North Dakota 34.2%
23. Towner County, North Dakota 34.0%
24. Bowman County, North Dakota 33.7%
25. Foster County, North Dakota 33.4%

== Notable people ==
- Fred G. Aandahl
- LeRoy H. Anderson
- Lynn Anderson
- Sigurd Anderson
- Aslag Benson
- Bertil W. Benson
- Gordon Berg
- Rick Berg
- Kenneth O. Bjork
- Nils Boe
- Harald Bredesen
- Norman Brunsdale
- Olger B. Burtness
- William C. Christianson
- Alf Clausen
- Christian M. Dahl
- Dorthea Dahl
- Math Dahl
- Paul Egertson
- CariDee English
- LeRoy Erickson
- Oscar E. Erickson
- Ralph J. Erickstad
- E. W. Everson
- Paul Fjelde
- Oscar Randolph Fladmark
- Myron Floren
- Hans Andersen Foss
- Joe Foss
- Wilbur Foss
- Michael E. Fossum
- Don Gaetz
- Rudolph Hjalmar Gjelsness
- Clarence Gonstead
- James D. Gronna
- Archie M. Gubbrud
- John Hamre
- Orin D. Haugen
- Brynhild Haugland
- Heidi Heitkamp
- Ralph Herseth
- Clint Hill (Secret Service)
- Johan Andreas Holvik
- Ernest and Clarence Iverson
- Simon Johnson (novelist)
- Tim Johnson (South Dakota politician)
- Carl O. Jorgenson
- Thomas S. Kleppe
- Harvey B. Knudson
- Coya Knutson
- Anton Kraabel
- Ed Kringstad
- Karen Ordahl Kupperman
- Jonny Lang
- Arthur Larson
- Ernest Lawrence
- John H. Lawrence
- Andrew E. Lee
- Peggy Lee
- Neil LeVang
- Henry G. Lykken
- George S. Mickelson
- George Theodore Mickelson
- John Moses (American politician)
- Janne Myrdal
- Gerhard Brandt Naeseth
- Ragnvald Nestos
- Kristi Noem
- Kemper Nomland
- Peter Norbeck
- Sondre Norheim
- Hjalmar Carl Nygaard
- Matthew G. Olsen
- Allen I. Olson
- Gunder Olson
- Kenton Onstad
- Carleton Opgaard
- Robert W. Peterson (politician)
- Aagot Raaen
- Scott Rislov
- Erling Nicolai Rolfsrud
- Ole Edvart Rølvaag
- Andrew J. Rommeriam
- Cyrus M. Running
- Martin Olav Sabo
- Stephanie Herseth Sandlin
- Peter O. Sathre
- Gilmore Schjeldahl
- Peter Schjeldahl
- Eric Sevareid
- Thomas Sletteland
- Arlan Stangeland
- Bob Stenehjem
- Wayne Stenehjem
- Obert C. Teigen
- Enoch Thorsgard
- John Thune
- Edward John Thye
- Merle Tuve
- James M. Wahl
- Jon Wefald
- Frank A. Wenstrom
