= Scandinavian-American Hall of Fame =

Cultural hall of fame

The Scandinavian-American Hall of Fame (SAHF) was established in 1984 in Minot, North Dakota, by the Norsk Høstfest Association. The Scandinavian-American Hall of Fame is "an enduring means of honoring the persons of Scandinavian descent in North America who have achieved greatness in their fields of endeavor and/or whose efforts have contributed significantly to the betterment of humankind. Each year a handful of noteworthy individuals of Danish, Icelandic, Finnish, Norwegian or Swedish descent are inducted into the Scandinavian-American Hall of Fame, which is held in conjunction with Norsk Høstfest, the annual 5-day fall festival celebrating Scandinavian heritage located in Minot, North Dakota.

Inductees include former U.S. Secret Service agent Clint Hill, American pilot Charles Lindbergh, astronaut Buzz Aldrin, actor Josh Duhamel, actress Tippi Hedren, Vegas casino owner Ralph Engelstad, Arctic explorers Ann Bancroft and Liv Arnesen, Princess Astrid of Norway, American broadcaster Orion Samuelson, Norsk Høstfest founder Chester Reiten and many more.

In 2009, the induction of Karl Rove into the Scandinavian-American Hall of Fame became a major dispute as political views clashed over the announcement. Then-Governor John Hoeven was scheduled to introduce Rove during the SAHF banquet, but Hoeven was unable to attend due to a schedule conflict. At that time, Rove was being investigated by the Democrats in Congress for his role in the 2006 dismissal of nine U.S. attorneys. In addition to the Scandinavian-American Hall of Fame Awards, it has been the practice of the Norsk Høstfest Association to recognize deserving non-Scandinavian-Americans and also notable Scandinavian nationals. These individuals are recognized in the following categories: Merit of Distinction Award in the Performing Arts; Humanitarian Award; The Høstfest Heritage Award; International Scandinavian Cultural Award; Høstfest Millennium Award; Explorer of the Millennium; and the Trailblazer Award. "The (Scandinavian-American) Hall of Fame is the premiere event at Norsk Høstfest," said Chester Reiten, founder of Norsk Høstfest. "It shows younger generations that they also may one day follow in these role models' footsteps."

== History of the SAHF ==
In 1983, Princess Astrid of Norway paid a royal visit to Norsk Høstfest in Minot, North Dakota. The visit was arranged to help put the Scandinavian festival on the map in Norway, as well as across the United States and Canada. A special banquet had been arranged to honor Princess Astrid during her 1983 visit - a banquet that proved to be so successful that organizers wanted to duplicate it the next year. The result: the inaugural Scandinavian-American Hall of Fame Banquet, held Oct. 19, 1984, and highlighted by the inductions of Sondre Norheim, the father of modern skiing; Casper Oimoen, a champion skier who captained the U.S. Olympic Ski Team in 1932 and 1936; pilot/explorer Carl Ben Eielson, the first person to fly nonstop over the top of the world; North Dakotan Brynhild Haugland, who, at her retirement, was the longest-serving state legislator in the nation; and Myron Floren, the famed accordionist on TV's "The Lawrence Welk Show. Then Minot Mayor and Høstfest founder Chester M. Reiten stated "I really feel this could be the biggest thing we could ever do because Minot and North Dakota are in the center of the nation and are a center of Scandinavian American population. It is only fitting that Minot be chosen as the home of the permanent Scandinavian(-American) Hall of Fame. The purpose of the Høstfest is to build pride in our heritage and so it's also fitting then the Høstfest sponsor the Hall of Fame."

== Scandinavian-American Hall of Fame inductees ==
2022 Eric Nelson, Nelson (Gunnar Nelson and Matthew Nelson)

2019 Darin Erstad, the Wisness Family, Richard Lindstrom MD

2018 Daniel O'Donnell, Ingebretsen Nordic Marketplace, Myron Thompson

2017 Tollefson Family; Soile Anderson; Nathan Myhrvold

2016 Beatrice Ojakangas, Stein Ove Fenne, and the Stenehjem family

2015 George C. Halvorson; Dorothy & H. David Dalquist; Robert Asp

2014 Doc Severinsen; Sig Hansen; Bobby Vee

2013 Keith Johanneson; The Nelson Family (Ozzie Nelson, Harriet Nelson, David and Eric "Ricky" Nelson); Kris Kristofferson

2012 Clint Hill; Josh Duhamel; Lauraine Snelling

2011 Clarence Iverson; Asger Boots Hansen; Chester Reiten; Henry, Harry and Mary Bakken

2010 Tippi Hedren; Lloyd Omdahl; Lute Olson; John D. Odegard

2009 Tom Netherton; Karl Rove; Allen O. Larson; United States Congressman Earl Pomeroy; Olav Thon

2008 John Ydstie; Clinton H. Severson; SSgt. William Dean Wilson; Doug Burgum

2007 Wayne Stenehjem; Sister Thomas Welder; Johann Olav Koss; HH Princess Astrid

2006 Carroll Juven; Jerry Iverson; John M. Lund; Governor John Hoeven

2005 Norma Larsen Zimmer; John D. Johnson; Ragnhild Hagen; Crown Princess Märtha

2004 Clay Jenkinson; The Honorable Kent Conrad; Ray Rude

2003 Jim Henson; Gary Tharaldson; Gen. Charles F. Wald; Lt. Gen. Jerry L. Sinn; Rear Admiral Michael H. Miller; Maj. Gen. Claude V. Christianson; Maj. Gen. Michael J. Haugen; Mark Lehner

2002 Alf Engen; Dr. Jon Wefald; Peggy Lee

2001 Odd S. Lovoll, Ph.D.; Winston R. Wallin; Ann Bancroft, Liv Arnesen

2000 Glenn Welstad; Phyllis Bryn-Julson; Bjorn Erik Borgen; Sacagawea

1999 Leif Eriksson; Governor William L. Guy; Governor Arthur A. Link; Governor Allen I. Olson; Governor George A. Sinner; Governor Edward T. Schafer

1998 Ralph Engelstad; Dale Morrison; Rolf Kristian Stang; Theodore Roosevelt Association and Theodore Roosevelt

1997 Kjell Bergh; Arlene Dahl; Dale Brown; Bjøro Håland

1996 Gary Swanson; Kenneth Dahlberg; Thor Heyerdahl; Håkan Hagegård; Charley Pride

1995 Joseph Enright; Celeste Holm; Harold Schafer; Gen. David C. Jones; Lt. General Donn R. Pepke; Lt. General Donn J. Robertson; Major General Neil D. Van Sickle; Rear Admiral Kenneth L. Veth; Brig. General John H. McGee; Joy Steenson Reiten

1994 Vilhjalmur Stefansson; Martin Olav Sabo; Byron Dorgan; Chet Atkins

1993 Eric Sevareid; Eric M. Hilton; Earle Hyman; Gerhard Heiberg

1992 Lenus Carlson; Marilyn Carlson Nelson; Stein Eriksen; Joe Foss

1991 Charles A. Lindbergh; Bud Grant; Gilmore Schjeldahl; Karsten Solheim; Fritz Scholder

1990 Victor Borge; John Hanson; Dr. Merton Utgaard

1989 99th Infantry Battalion; Curtis Carlson; Allen Olson; Erling Nicolai Rolfsrud; William Guy

1988 Anne Carlsen; Thomas Kleppe; Knute Rockne; O.E. Rolvaag

1987 Agnes Geelan; Norman Lorentzsen; Walter Mondale; Dr. Marion Nelson; Sidney Anders Rand

1986 Dr. Norman E. Borlaug; Brad Gjermundson; Jan Stenerud; Arley Bjella; Ragnvold Nestos; Lars Ueland

1985 Buzz Aldrin; Lynn Anderson; Knut Haukelid; John Moses; Orion Samuelson

1984 Brynhild Haugland; Casper Oimoen; Carl Ben Eielson; Myron Floren; Sondre Norheim

== Special awards ==
Merit of Distinction Award in the Performing Arts Charley Pride - 1996, Country Music Superstar and longtime performer at Norsk Høstfest; Bjøro Håland (also spelled Bjøro Haaland) - 1997, Norwegian Country Music Star

Humanitarian Award Fritz Scholder, 1991; Earle Hyuman, 1993; Chet Atkins, 1994; Harold Schafer, 1995; Dale Brown, 1997; Ragnhild Hagen, 2005; Johann Olav Koss, 2007; Sister Thomas Welder, 2007; Doug Burgum, 2008; Olav Thon, 2009

Meritorious Patriotism Award In the wake of the infamous terror attacks on New York City and Washington, D.C., on Sept. 22, 2001, the Scandinavian-American Hall of Fame Awards Banquet on Oct. 8, 2003, proudly conferred five outstanding military leaders from Minot, North Dakota with the prestigious Meritorious Patriotism Award presented by the Honorable Byron Dorgan, United States Senator and 1994 Scandinavian-American Hall of Fame Inductee. The 2003 award recipients were: Lt. Gen. Jerry L. Sinn; Rear Admiral Michael H. Miller; Maj. Gen. Claude V. Christianson; Maj. Gen. Michael J. Haugen; Mark Lehner.

In 1995, as the world marked the 50th anniversary of the end of World War II and the restoration of peace and freedom for the peoples of many countries who were subject to a reign of terror and oppression, the Scandinavian-American Hall of Fame recognized six flag officer, an admiral and five generals, all of whom fought in WWII and were raised in the Magic City of Minot, N.D. Those award recipients were: Gen. David C. Jones; Lt. General Donn R. Pepke; Lt. General Donn J. Robertson; Major General Neil D. Van Sickle; Rear Admiral Kenneth L. Veth; Brig. General John H. McGee

Høstfest Heritage Award Theodore Roosevelt Association, 1998; Theodore Roosevelt Medora Foundation, 1998; United States Marine Corps Staff Sergeant William Dean Wilson, 2008

International Scandinavian Cultural Award Gerhard Heiberg, 1993; Håkan Hagegård, 1996; Dr. Thor Heyerdahl, 1996; HRH Crown Princess Märtha of Norway, 2005; HH Princess Astrid, 2007

Høstfest Millennium Award Established in 1999 to pay tribute to the living past and present governors of North Dakota: William L. Guy; Arthur A. Link; Allen I. Olson; George A. Sinner; Edward T. Schafer

Explorer of the Millennium American Viking Leif Eriksson

Trailblazer Award Sacagawea, 2000; Ann Bancroft & Liv Arnesen, 2001; Mark Lehner, 2004
