= Anne Carlsen =

American educator and disability rights advocate

- Born: Anne Helen Carlsen; November 4, 1915; Grantsburg, Wisconsin, U.S.
- Died: December 2, 2002 (aged 87); Jamestown, North Dakota, U.S.
- Monuments: Bronze statue at Anne Carlsen Center in Jamestown, North Dakota
- Education: Northern University of Colorado; University of Minnesota
- Occupations: Educator; educational administrator; public speaker; author
- Years active: 1938-1988
- Employer: Crippled Children's School
- Known for: Overcoming physical disability, education of persons with disabilities, national support for employment of persons with physical disabilities, international speaking

Anne Helen Carlsen (November 4, 1915 – December 2, 2002) was an American special educator born without forearms or lower legs, a disability rights advocate, private school superintendent, author, and namesake of a private school.

== Early years and early education ==
Carlsen was born in Grantsburg, Wisconsin on Nov. 4, 1915 without forearms or functioning lower legs. Her upper arms ended above the elbow levels. One leg ended above the knee and the other "was malformed, terminating in a club foot." She was the daughter of Alfred and Maren (Nielsen) Carlsen. Her mind was sharp so her parents and siblings (four brothers and an older sister) encouraged her learning and development at home. Carlsen's mother died when she was 4 years old, so Carlsen's father and older sister raised her. She made friends and learned to swim and play baseball. Walking was accomplished with the help of a kiddie car. She adapted to fine motor tasks, including writing and feeding herself, by using her upper arms. She started her formal education at the age of 8 years and completed school through the 8th grade in Grantsburg at the age of 12 years (including the completion of two grade levels in one year). Her brothers would carry her to and from school or pull her on a sled when there was enough snow on the ground. While in high school, Carlsen received therapy and surgery to be able to walk. Contractures of her knees were straightened after which she was fitted with artificial legs and learned to walk while aided by crutches. She attended high school in St. Paul Minnesota graduating from St. Paul Luther Academy at the age of 16 years. As an adult, she learned to drive a car.

College advisors tried to convince Carlsen that she would never be hired as a teacher, so she briefly attempted writing as a career before returning to her dream of being a teacher. She graduated in 1934 from St. Paul-Luther Jr. College - St. Paul, Minnesota. Following graduation she attended the University of Minnesota, graduating cum laude in 1936, earning a degree in writing.

== Graduate degrees and career in education with significant awards and appointments ==
"Despite her excellent references and transcript, Anne had difficulty getting a job as a writer during the Depression era and encountered discrimination along the way". In 1938, Carlsen accepted a high school teaching position at the Good Samaritan School in Fargo, North Dakota, a Lutheran school for children with physical disabilities She moved back to St. Paul, Minnesota in 1940 to teach Junior High for one year at Gillette State Hospital. Also in 1940, the Good Samaritan Society split into two groups; the Evangelical Lutheran Good Samaritan Society and Lutheran Hospitals and Homes. In 1941, Lutheran Hospitals and Homes Society purchased the Good Samaritan School in Fargo, ND, renamed it "Crippled Children's School," and moved it to Jamestown, North Dakota. That same year, Carlsen moved to Jamestown, ND to become principal of the Crippled Children's School. After the School moved to Jamestown, Carlsen continued her education, earning an M.A. in four summers from Northern University of Colorado in 1946. Then she earned a Ph.D. from the University of Minnesota in 1949. Dr. Carlsen's Ph.D. thesis was "A Comparative Study of the Response of Crippled and Non-Crippled Adolescents on Some Personality and Interests Tests." She was a member of the honorary scholastic societies Phi Theta Kappa, Delta Phi Lambda and Psi Chi. She returned to Jamestown and her position as the School's principal in 1950. She was also named its superintendent that year. Carlsen held the administrator position until her retirement in 1981. She also served the School as child guidance director from 1950 to 1981. On a leave of absence, she served as the Clinic Coordinator for Cerebral Palsied Children School in Southern California. After her retirement from the Crippled Children's School in 1981, Carlsen served as a consultant to the School and a mentor to its students until her death on December 2, 2002, in Jamestown, ND.

Carlsen wrote several articles about people living with disabilities for regional and national publications. As Carlsen gained attention as a disabilities advocate, the Crippled Children's School in Jamestown, as it was known, also gained national attention.

== National attention and recognition ==
On May 7, 1958, in Washington, D.C., Carlsen was awarded the President's Trophy as Handicapped American of the Year, an award presented annually by the President's Committee on Employment of the Physically Handicapped. The presentation was made by then Vice-President Richard M. Nixon. Carlsen was nominated for the award by the North Dakota Governor's Committee on Employment of the Handicapped. The nomination was supported by the governors of North Dakota, South Dakota, Illinois, Iowa, and Montana as well as numerous former students and scores of officials in the field of rehabilitation. She was nominated for and received the award for "devoting her entire lifetime to the rehabilitation and education of severely handicapped children" and for developing "an international reputation for her amazing accomplishments." She was described as an inspiration who helped students achieve independence. On September 9, 1966, Carlsen received the State of North Dakota's most prestigious award, the Theodore Roosevelt Rough Rider Award, from North Dakota Governor William Guy. In 1975, she was inducted into the National Teachers Hall of Fame. On October 26, 1985, Dr. Carlsen was inducted into the National Hall of Fame for Persons with Disabilities. She was inducted into the Scandinavian-American Hall of Fame in 1988. In 1983, President Ronald Reagan appointed Dr. Anne Carlsen vice-chair of the President's Committee on Employing the Handicapped.

Carlsen received numerous other awards and served on numerous local, statewide, and national committees. She received three honorary degrees: Doctor of Humane Letters - University of North Dakota 1982, Doctor of Humane Letters - Wartburg College, Waverly, IA 1960, and Doctor of Laws - Jamestown College, Jamestown, ND 1959.

The Crippled Children's School in Jamestown was renamed The Anne Carlsen Center in honor of Dr. Carlsen in 1980. In 1985, the Center installed and dedicated a permanent bronze statue of Dr. Carlsen with a young child at the center's front entrance. In spite of all the accolades she received, in a 1981 interview, Dr. Carlsen said "her greatest satisfactions as an educator and mentor ... were the graduates of the Center."

== Notable written works ==
"Dr. Anne" – 1979 (Augsburg Publishing House)

== Local, state, and national boards service ==
- N.D. Advisory Committee on Sheltered Workshops
- National Advisory Council on Implementation of Recommendations of White House Conference on Handicapped Individual 1978, 1971–75
- National Advisory Committee on Purchased of Products and Services of Blind & Severely Handicapped, 1971–82
- N.D. State Advisory Committee on Rehabilitation Services, 1977
- N.D. Delegate to White House Conference on Handicapped Individuals, 1971–78
- N.D. State Advisory Committee on Developmental Disabilities, 1960–1964
- National Advisory Committee on Vocational Rehabilitation, 1959–89
- President's Committee on Employment of the Handicapped (Sub-Committees - Women's Committee - Physically Handicapped Committee), 1983–89
- Vice-Chairman of President's Committee on Employment of the Handicapped
- Jamestown Mayor's Committee on Employment of the Handicapped
- American Assoc. of University Women (Chairman - Social Studies Committee 1952–56)
- N.D. Psychological Assoc. (Secretary 1961–63, President 1964)
- Council for Exceptional Children
- N.D. Council for Exceptional Children
- Nat. Rehabilitation Assoc.
- N.D. Rehabilitation Association (President, 1961), 1954–81
- American Assoc. of University Women (Chairman - Social Studies Committee 1952–56)
- N.D. Conference of Social Welfare (Member Executive Comm 1954–57 & 1960–61)
- N.D. Mental Health Assoc.
- American Assoc. of University Women (Chairman - Social Studies Committee 1952–56)
- Zonta International (Secretary 1962–63; President 1970)
- American Assoc. of University Women (Chairman - Social Studies Committee 1952–56)

== Awards ==
- Scandinavian-American Hall of Fame Inductee 1988
- Nat. Hall of Fame for Persons with Disabilities, Columbus, OH 1985
- Good Shepherd Home Hall of Fame - Allentown PA 1985
- Endow-A-Dream Award - W. Clements & Jessie V. Stone Foundation 1981
- Woman of Conscience for 1981 - Nat. Council of Women of the U.S.
- Greater N.D. Award for outstanding service to N.D. - Greater N.D. Assoc. 1980
- Courage Award for improving attitudes and providing services for the handicapped (while this word is unacceptable in 21st century parlance, and the word "disabled" is preferred, this is the correct title of the specific award given in 1980) - Courage Center, Golden Valley, MN 1980
- Service to Mankind - Sertoma International, ND - Manitoba District 1976
- Bicentennial Woman in History - N.D. Business and Professional Women 1976
- Citation for Outstanding Humanitarian Service - Red River Valley Synod, Lutheran Church in American 1975
- Golden Plate Award - American Academy of Achievement 1975
- Inducted into National Teachers Hall of Fame 1975
- N.D. 50th Anniversary Rehabilitant - Division of Vocational Rehabilitation 1970
- Humanitarian Award - N.D. Council for Exceptional Children 1970
- Theodore Roosevelt Rough Rider Award - State of N.D. 1966
- Outstanding Citizen of the Year - Jamestown Chamber of Commerce 1967
- Minnesota Outstanding Achievement Award - University of Minnesota 1964
- President's Trophy - Handicapped American of the Year 1958
- Wartburg College—The Graven Award for Outstanding Christian Lay Leadership 1991
- Moorhead State University - L.B. Hartz - Professional Achievement Award 1991
