= Poet Laureate of North Dakota =

- Incumbent; Denise Lajimodiere
- Type: Poet Laureate
- Term length: Lifetime (1957–2023); 2 years (2023–2025); 5 years (2025–Present)
- Formation: 1957
- First holder: Corbin A. Waldron

The poet laureate of North Dakota is the poet laureate for the U.S. state of North Dakota. Initially serving in perpetuity, the program began with the appointment of Corbin A. Waldron in 1957. After the death of Larry Woiwode in 2022, the North Dakota Legislative Assembly modified the office to hold a two year term in 2023, with the term being extended to five years in 2025.

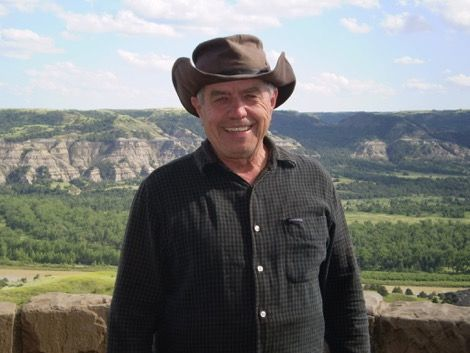
Larry Woiwode was poet laureate from 1995 to until his death in 2022.

== List of poets laureate ==
- Corbin A. Waldron (1957–1978)
  - Henry R. Martinson (associate)
  - Lydia O. Jackson (associate)
- Larry Woiwode (1985–2022)
  - Madelyn Camrud (associate)
  - Heid Erdrich (associate)
  - Louise Erdrich (associate)
  - Dale Jacobson (associate & Honorary Poet Laureate of North Dakota)
  - Denise Lajimodiere (associate)
  - Jamie Parsley (associate)
  - Shadd Piehl (associate)
  - Dave Solheim (associate)
  - Bonnie Larson Staiger (associate)
  - Warren Sturlaugson (associate)
  - Mark Vinz (associate)
  - Ron Vossler (associate)
  - Rick Watson (associate)
- Denise Lajimodiere (2023–Present)

== See also ==
- Poet laureate
- List of U.S. state poets laureate
- United States Poet Laureate
