= Schjeldahl =

Schjeldahl is a surname. Notable people with the surname include:

- Gilmore Schjeldahl (1912–2002), American businessman and inventor
- Peter Schjeldahl (1942–2022), American art critic, poet, and educator
