= Elizabeth Bodine =

American humanitarian

Elizabeth Bodine (February 25, 1898 – July 3, 1986) was an American humanitarian. She was given the Theodore Roosevelt Rough Rider Award in July 1979 in recognition of the International Year of the Child. She was honored as North Dakota Mother of the Year and National Mother of the Year in 1968.

== Biography ==
Elizabeth Louise Grossman Bodine was born in the Province of Posen. She spoke German as her first language. She and her family immigrated from Germany to the United States during 1913.

Bodine contributed clothing and food to her relatives in Poland during World War II and sent boxes of clothing to Vietnam. She also spent many years volunteering to assist the Native American population in the Belcourt-area.

Bodine was the mother of 18 children, each of whom received a post-high school education. Her ten sons received college degrees, and six of her daughters attended college while the other two daughters received business training. For 26 years, including ten summer sessions, one or more of her family was enrolled at Minot State College.
