= Gary Tharaldson =

American businessman

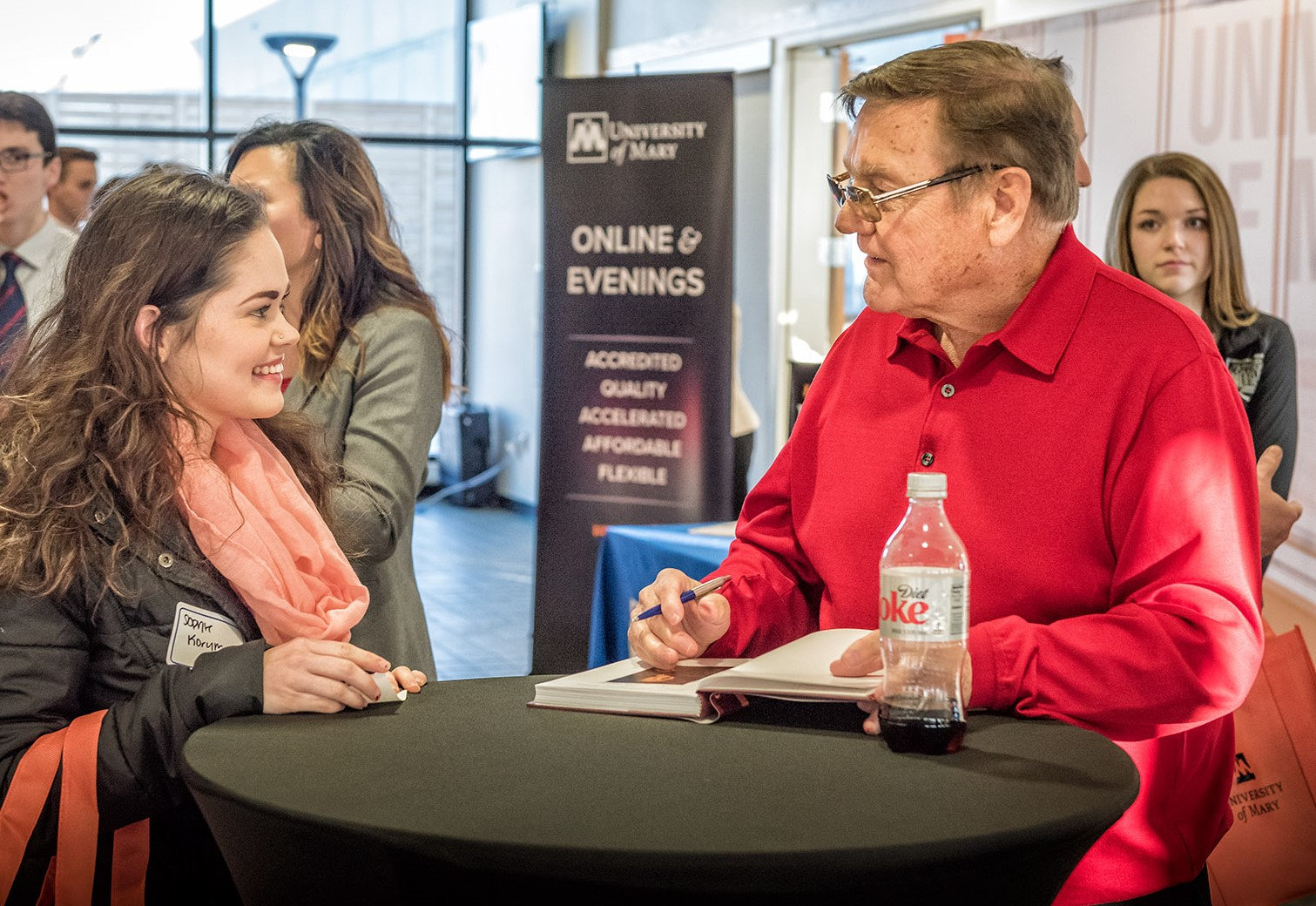
- Tharaldson in 2017
- Born: October 17, 1945 (age 80); Dazey, North Dakota, U.S.
- Education: Valley City State University (BS); North Dakota State University (attended)

Gary Tharaldson is an American entrepreneur and founder of the Tharaldson Companies. As of 2019, Tharaldson is the wealthiest individual in North Dakota.

Gary Tharaldson was born in and grew up in Dazey, North Dakota. He graduated from Valley City State University with degrees in business administration and physical education. He did graduate work at North Dakota State University in Fargo and taught school in Leonard, North Dakota for two years. He has been extensively involved at the University of Mary in Bismarck, North Dakota, lending his name and acumen to the university's "Gary Tharaldson School of Business", serving for a time on the university's board of trustees, and receiving an honorary doctorate from the university in 2018.

Tharaldson Hospitality builds and operates hotels across the United States. Tharaldson Companies was established in 1982 by Gary Tharaldson, with the purchase of a Super 8 Motel in Valley City, North Dakota. Gary Tharaldson is listed among the 1998 Forbes 400 Richest Americans, and his organization, since its establishment, has grown to be one of America's largest developers of new hotels. In 2003, Tharaldson was inducted into the Scandinavian-American Hall of Fame.
