= Larry Woiwode =

American writer (1941–2022)

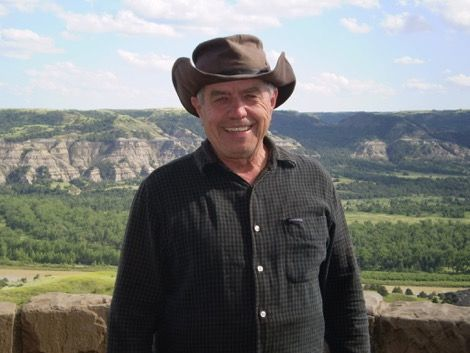
- Woiwode in Western North Dakota
- Born: October 30, 1941; Carrington, North Dakota, U.S.
- Died: April 28, 2022 (aged 80); Bismarck, North Dakota, U.S.
- Occupations: Novelist; poet; professor
- Writing career
- Language: English
- Notable works: What I'm Going to Do, I Think; Beyond the Bedroom Wall

Larry Alfred Woiwode (October 30, 1941 – April 28, 2022) was an American writer from North Dakota, where he was the state's Poet Laureate from 1995 until his death. His work appeared in The New Yorker, Esquire, The Atlantic Monthly, Harpers, Gentleman's Quarterly, The Partisan Review and The Paris Review. He was the author of five novels; two collections of short stories; a commentary titled "Acts"; a biography of the Gold Seal founder and entrepreneur, Harold Schafer, Aristocrat of the West; a book of poetry, Even Tide; and reviews and essays and essay-reviews that appeared in dozens of publications, including The New York Times and The Washington Post Book World. He received North Dakota's highest honor, the Theodore Roosevelt Rough Rider Award, in 1992.

== Work ==
Woiwode's debut novel, What I'm Going to Do, I Think, won acclaim and the William Faulkner Foundation Award (1970) for the best first novel of 1969. He further received a Guggenheim Foundation Fellowship (1971–1972), two awards from the American Academy of Arts and Letters - in 1980 the Arts and Letters Award and in 1995 the Award of Merit Medal, the John Dos Passos Prize for Literature (1990), the Aga Khan Prize for Fiction (1990), and a Lannan Literary Fellowship for Fiction (2002). Beyond the Bedroom Wall (1975) sold over 1,000,000 copies, and was a finalist for both the National Book Award and the National Book Critics Circle Award. Talking about the title of this novel, Woiwode told Alok Mishra in an interview that he wanted to suggest that a larger world of interest lay beyond the bedroom. It was because most of the novels of that time dealt with sex excessively. He published two dozen stories in The New Yorker.

Born in Carrington, North Dakota, Woiwode attended the University of Illinois at Urbana–Champaign for four and a half years, where he worked with John Frederick Nims and Charles Shattuck, and after serving as copywriter and voice-over and live talent for a CBS affiliate in the area he left to live in New York for five years. He returned to New York state after the death of John Gardner, and took Gardner's position as director of the Creative Writing Program at Binghamton University; he was a tenured full professor there, besides directing the Creative Writing Program. He spent several years living and working on short stories and his third novel in the Chicago area before returning to North Dakota in 1978, where he lived twelve miles outside Mott and raised registered quarterhorses.

Besides his tenure at Binghamton, he served as Writer in Residence at the University of Wisconsin, Madison, and conducted summer sessions as a professor at Wheaton College, Chicago, and the C.S. Lewis Seminars at Cambridge; he also conducted seminars and workshops in fourteen states of the U.S., all of the Canadian provinces but British Columbia, and in England, Lithuania, and Scandinavia. His work has been translated into a dozen languages, and Johnathan Yardley of The Washington Post Book World named Beyond the Bedroom Wall one of the 20 best novels of the 20th Century. Woiwode published a dozen books in a variety of genres, six of which have been named notable books of the year by the New York Times Book Review. Among his recent publications are two memoirs that were widely reviewed: What I Think I Did and A Step From Death.

Woiwode taught at the University of Jamestown and in 2020 was appointed Writer in Residence at the University of Mary in Bismarck, North Dakota, where he lectured and taught until his death.

Woiwode died in Bismarck, North Dakota after a short illness on April 28, 2022, at age 80.

== Bibliography ==
=== Novels ===
- What I’m Going to Do, I Think (Farrar, Straus & Giroux, 1969)
- Beyond the Bedroom Wall (Farrar, Straus & Giroux, 1975)
- Poppa John (Farrar, Straus & Giroux, 1981)
- Born Brothers (Farrar, Straus & Giroux, 1988)
- Indian Affairs (Atheneum, 1992)

=== Poetry ===
- Even Tide (Farrar, Straus & Giroux, 1977)

=== Stories ===
- Neumiller Stories (Farrar, Straus & Giroux, 1989)
- Silent Passengers (Atheneum, 1993)

=== Other ===
- Poetry North: Five Poets of North Dakota (1970)
- Acts (1993)
- Aristocrat of the West: The Story of Harold Schafer (2000)
- What I Think I Did: A Season of Survival in Two Acts (2000)
- A Step From Death (2008)
- Words Made Fresh: Essays on Literature and Culture (2011)
- The Invention of Lefse (2011)
- Words for Readers and Writers (2013)
- The Dignity of Grace: A Life of Sister Thomas Welder (2021)
- A Legacy of Passion: The Scheel Family Story (2022)

== See also ==
- List of U.S. state poets laureate
