= International Year of the Child =

1979 UN theme year

- Date: 1 January – 31 December 1979
- Location: Worldwide

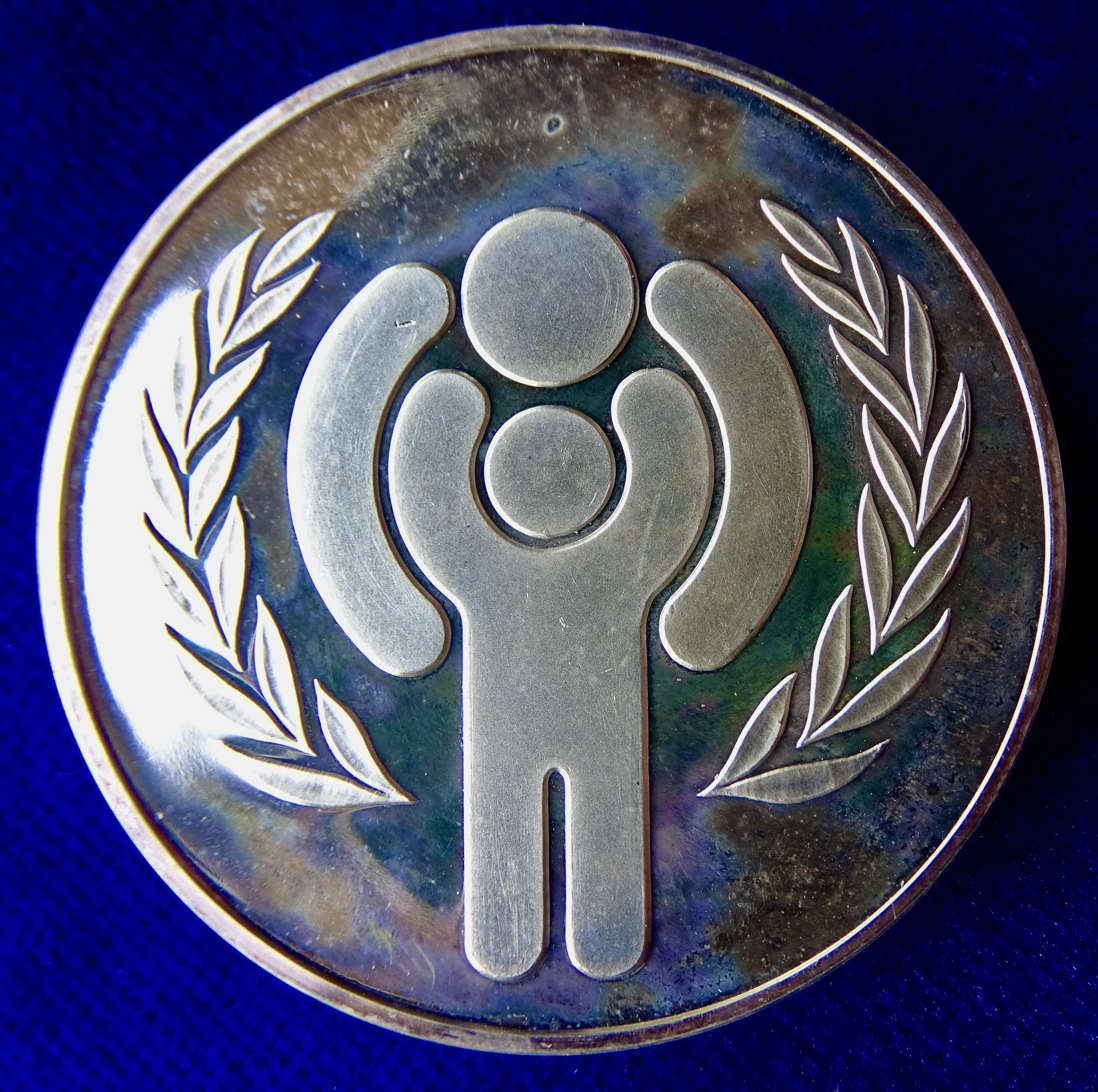
UNICEF International Year of the Child 1979 German Silver Medal, obverse

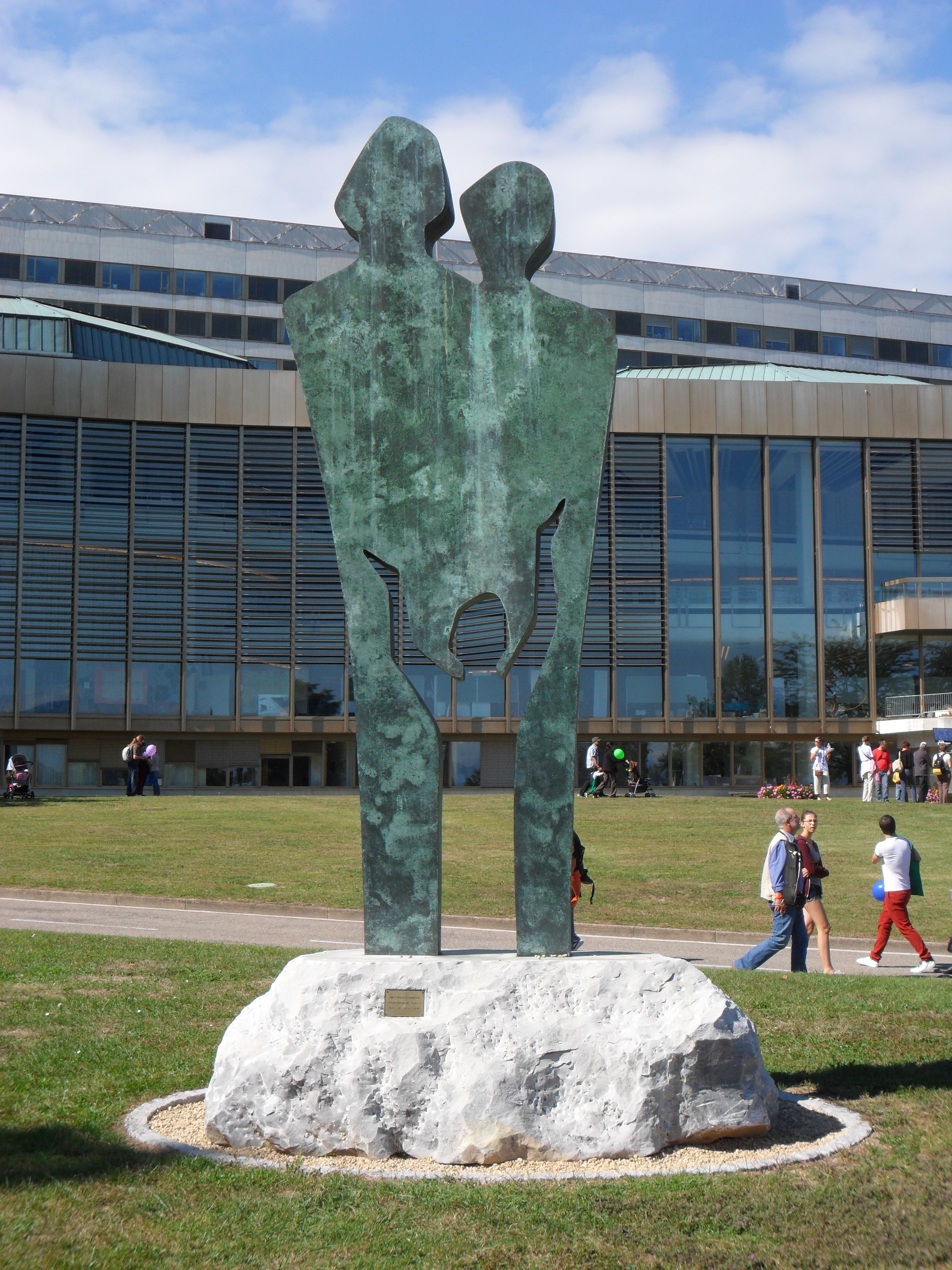
Two parents and a child: the statue Family in the garden of the Palace of Nations (United Nations Office at Geneva) is a commemoration of the International Year of the Child.

The United Nations General Assembly proclaimed 1979 as the International Year of the Child. The proclamation, made on 21 December 1976, was signed on 1 January 1979, by United Nations Secretary General Kurt Waldheim. A follow-up to the 1959 Declaration of the Rights of the Child, the proclamation was intended to draw attention to problems that affected children throughout the world, including malnutrition and lack of access to education. Many of these efforts resulted in the Convention on the Rights of the Child in 1989.

== History ==
Numerous events took place within the United Nations and in member countries to mark the event, including the Music for UNICEF Concert, held at the United Nations General Assembly Hall on 9 January 1979 and the film festival showcasing international cartoon and film shorts focused on children held at the headquarters of the United Nations on 1 December 1979. Other events include:

- WBZ-TV in Boston, United States, along with the four other Group W stations, hosted and broadcast a celebratory festival, "Kidsfair" (usually held around Labor Day ever since) from Boston Common.
- Canadian animator/director Eugene Fedorenko created a film for the National Film Board of Canada, called Every Child, which centered on a nameless baby who nobody wants because they are too busy with their own concerns. This was used to explain how every child is entitled to a home. Sound effects were created with the voices of Les Mimes Electriques.
- The Ministry of Education of Spain, organized the First Ibero-American Children's Song Festival (Spanish: Primer Festival de la Canción Infantil Iberoamericana). Ibero-American countries were invited to participate, of which fourteen accepted. Each of the fifteen countries (Note: Namely, in running order: Guatemala, Venezuela, Puerto Rico, United States, Panama, Costa Rica, Dominican Republic, Chile, Peru, Colombia, Argentina, Spain, Portugal, Paraguay, and Cuba) was represented by one, two, or three child singers selected from schools, who sang original songs, and had won the national pre-selections in their respective countries. The final gala was held on 20 December 1979 at the Teatro Real in Madrid, was broadcast live by Televisión Española (TVE) in Spain and by other Organización de Televisión Iberoamericana (OTI) member broadcasters in Ibero-America.

== See also ==
- Elizabeth Bodine
- International observance
- International Youth Year
- Children's rights
