= Rough Rider Award =

North Dakota Award

The Theodore Roosevelt Rough Rider Award is an award presented by the governor of the state of North Dakota to prominent North Dakotans. The award "recognizes present and former North Dakotans who have been influenced by the state in achieving national recognition in their fields of endeavor, thereby reflecting credit and honor upon North Dakota and its citizens."

It has been awarded 50 times to 52 North Dakotans since its establishment in 1961 under Governor William L. Guy.

== Recipients ==
Name	Rationale	Date of Award
Lawrence Welk	Career as an entertainer	August 28, 1961
Dorothy Stickney	Career as an actress	November 2, 1961
Ivan Dmitri	Career as an artist	April 13, 1962
Roger Maris	Career as an athlete	January 4, 1964
Eric Sevareid	Career as a journalist	April 17, 1964
General Harold K. Johnson	Military service, 24th Chief of Staff of the U. S. Army	April 23, 1965
Dr. Anne H. Carlsen	Career as an educator	September 9, 1966
Edward K. Thompson	Career as a journalist	April 19, 1968
Dr. Robert Henry Bahmer	Career as an archivist, 4th Archivist of the United States	July 28, 1970
Louis L'Amour	Career as an author	May 26, 1972
Bertin C. Gamble	Career as an entrepreneur	October 20, 1972
Casper Oimoen	Career as an athlete	February 12, 1973
Peggy Lee	Career as an entertainer	May 23, 1975
Harold Schafer	Career as an entrepreneur	July 4, 1975
Era Bell Thompson	Career as a journalist	August 14, 1976
Dr. Leon Orris Jacobson	Career as a physician	October 1, 1976
Elizabeth Bodine	Humanitarian activities	July 27, 1979
Phyllis Frelich	Career as an actress	April 27, 1981
Clifford "Fido" Purpur	Career as an athlete	May 16, 1981
General David C. Jones	Military service, 9th Chairman of the Joint Chiefs of Staff	May 21, 1982
Ronald N. Davies	Career as a jurist	June 11, 1987
Phil Jackson	Career as an athlete and coach	July 30, 1992
Larry Woiwode	Career as an author	October 23, 1992
Angie Dickinson	Career as an actress	December 2, 1992
Reverend Richard C. Halverson	Career as a clergyman, 60th Chaplain of the U. S. Senate	March 26, 1994
Brynhild Haugland	Career as a legislator	March 20, 1995
Admirial William A. Owens	Military service, 3rd Vice Chairman of the Joint Chiefs of Staff	January 29, 1996
Carl Ben Eielson	Career as an aviator	August 26, 1997
Warren Christopher	Career as a public servant	June 20, 1998
Bobby Vee	Career as an entertainer	June 20, 1999
Chester "Chet" Reiten	Career as an entrepreneur	October 8, 2002
Thomas J. Clifford	Career as an educator	November 23, 2002
Sister Thomas Welder	Career as an educator	May 1, 2004
Harry J. Pearce	Career as a businessman	August 11, 2004
William C. Marcil	Career as a businessman	May 18, 2006
Woodrow W. Keeble	Military service, Medal of Honor recipient	July 23, 2009
Doug Burgum	Career as an entrepreneur and philanthropist	November 20, 2009
Ronald D. Offutt	Career as an entrepreneur and philanthropist	September 15, 2011
Louise Erdrich	Career as an author	April 19, 2013
Herman Stern	Career as a businessman, activist, and humanitarian	March 13, 2004
Gerald W. VandeWalle	Career as a jurist, 43rd Chief Justice of the North Dakota Supreme Court	January 7, 2014
John D. Odegard	Career in aviation and education	October 15, 2015
Eugene Dahl	Career as a businessman and entrepreneur	October 28, 2016
Clint Hill	Career as a U. S. Secret Service agent	October 5, 2018
Monique Lamoureux and Jocelyne Lamoureux	Careers as athletes, Olympic gold medalists	July 14, 2021
Dr. Merton B. Utgaard	Career as an educator, founder of International Music Camp	July 29, 2022
Virgil Hill	Career as an athlete	October 30, 2023
James Buchli	Career as an aviator and astronaut	July 30, 2024
Steve D. Scheel	Career as an entrepreneur and philanthropist	November 26, 2024
Troy Steiner and Terry Steiner	Careers as athletes and coaches	October 1, 2026
