= George Halvorson =

American former healthcare executive

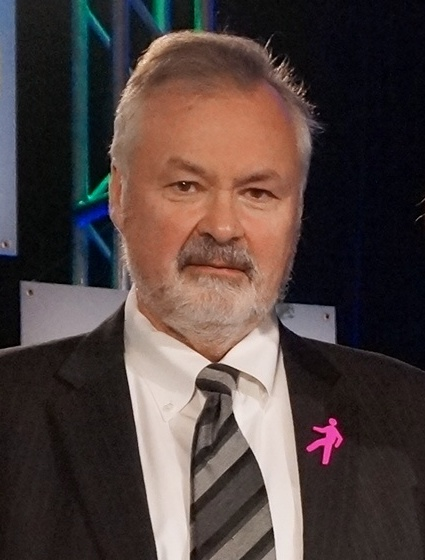
- Halvorson in 2013
- Born: George Halvorson; January 28, 1947 (age 78); Minnesota, U.S.
- Occupation(s): Chair and CEO of The Institute for InterGroup Understanding

George Halvorson (born January 28, 1947) is a retired American healthcare executive who was CEO of Kaiser Permanente. He is the Chair and CEO of the Institute for InterGroup Understanding.

== Education ==
Halvorson holds a B.A. in history, political science and English, from Concordia College (Moorhead, Minnesota). He then took graduate study courses at the University of Minnesota and from the University of St. Thomas, St. Paul, Minnesota.

== Work ==
Halvorson is a long-time American healthcare executive who served as Kaiser Permanente CEO and chairman from 2002 to 2014 before retiring as CEO in 2013 and chair in January 2014. The Kaiser Permanente board of directors elected Bernard Tyson to the CEO role upon Halvorson's retirement. Halvorson was CEO of HealthPartners in Minnesota for 17 years before going to Kaiser Permanente.

Halvorson is the Chair of the First 5 California Commission for children and families. Governor Brown appointed Halvorson to a four-year term as Chair, which ended in 2021. The Commission uses money raised from tobacco taxes to provide support and education to children in California from birth to five years old.

Halvorson has been the Chair and CEO of the Institute for InterGroup Understanding since June 2012. The institute works on issues of racism, prejudice, discrimination and intergroup stress and conflict. Halvorson has published nine books on health care reform including Health Care Co-Ops in Uganda with the most recent being Ending Racial, Ethnic and Cultural Disparities in American Health Care.

Halvorson has also published four books on instinctive interactions for groups of people: Primal Pathways, The Cusp of Chaos, The Art of InterGroup Peace, Peace in Our Time, and one book on early childhood brain development, Three Key Years.

Halvorson was chair of the health governors at the World Economic Forum in Davos, Switzerland. He also chaired The International Federation of Health Plans, The Partners for Quality Care and The American Association of Health Plans. He is an emeritus board member for the International Federation of Health Plans.

== Awards and recognition ==
In 2015 Halvorson received the IMPACT Visionary Award from AdAge. He is a member of the Bay Area Council Business Hall of Fame. In 2015, Halvorson was inducted into the Scandinavian-American Hall of Fame, held during Norsk Høstfest.
