= Thomas Welder =

University president, Benedictine nun

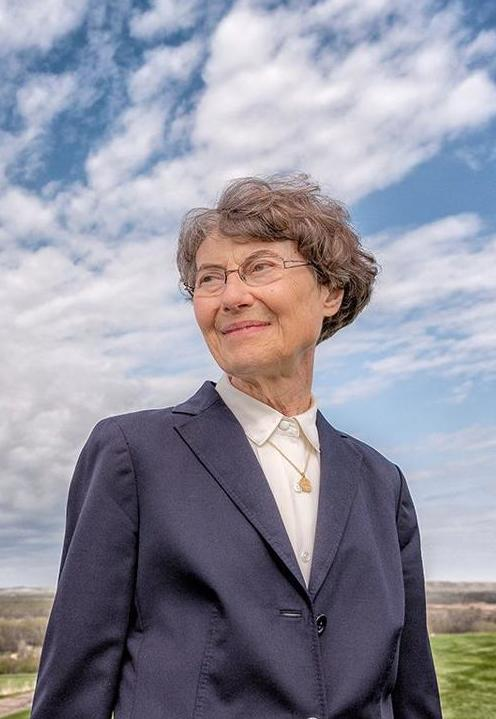

President of the University of Mary
- In office 1978–2009

Personal details
- Born: Diane Marie Welder; April 27, 1940 Linton, North Dakota, U.S.
- Died: June 22, 2020 (aged 80) Bismarck, North Dakota, U.S.
- Education: College of St. Scholastica (BA); Northwestern University (MMus)

Sister Thomas Welder, OSB (born Diane Marie Welder; April 27, 1940 – June 22, 2020) was an American educator, academic administrator, and Benedictine nun. Born and raised in North Dakota, she entered Annunciation Monastery in 1959, at age 19. She began working at the Benedictine-sponsored Mary College in 1963 and served as its president from 1978 to 2009. Under Welder, the college expanded to become the University of Mary. She received North Dakota's highest honor, the Theodore Roosevelt Rough Rider Award, in 2004.

== Early life and education ==
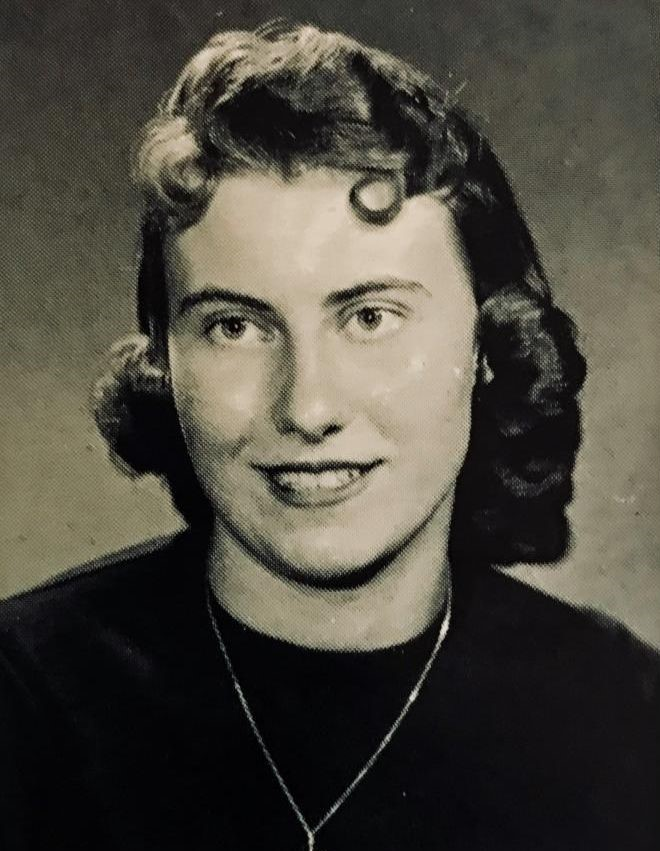
Welder's St. Mary's Central High School photo (1958).

Diane Marie Welder was born on April 27, 1940, in Linton, North Dakota, to Mary Ann (née Kuhn) and Sebastian Welder. Her father died of a kidney condition in 1951; her mother became a Benedictine sister in 1968, after raising Welder and her siblings. Four of Welder's maternal aunts also joined religious orders. Welder attended Cathedral Elementary School and St. Mary's Central High School, Bismarck, North Dakota, graduating in 1958. She studied at the College of St. Benedict in Minnesota, where she discerned her vocation to religious life.

Welder returned to Bismarck to enter the community of Benedictine nuns at Annunciation Monastery. The Benedictines founded Mary College in 1959; Welder was a member of their first freshman class. She was given the religious name "Sister Thomas" when she entered the novitiate. She made a religious profession in 1961 and a perpetual monastic profession in 1964. She completed a bachelor's degree at the College of St. Scholastica in 1963 and received a master's degree in music from Northwestern University in 1968.

== Career ==
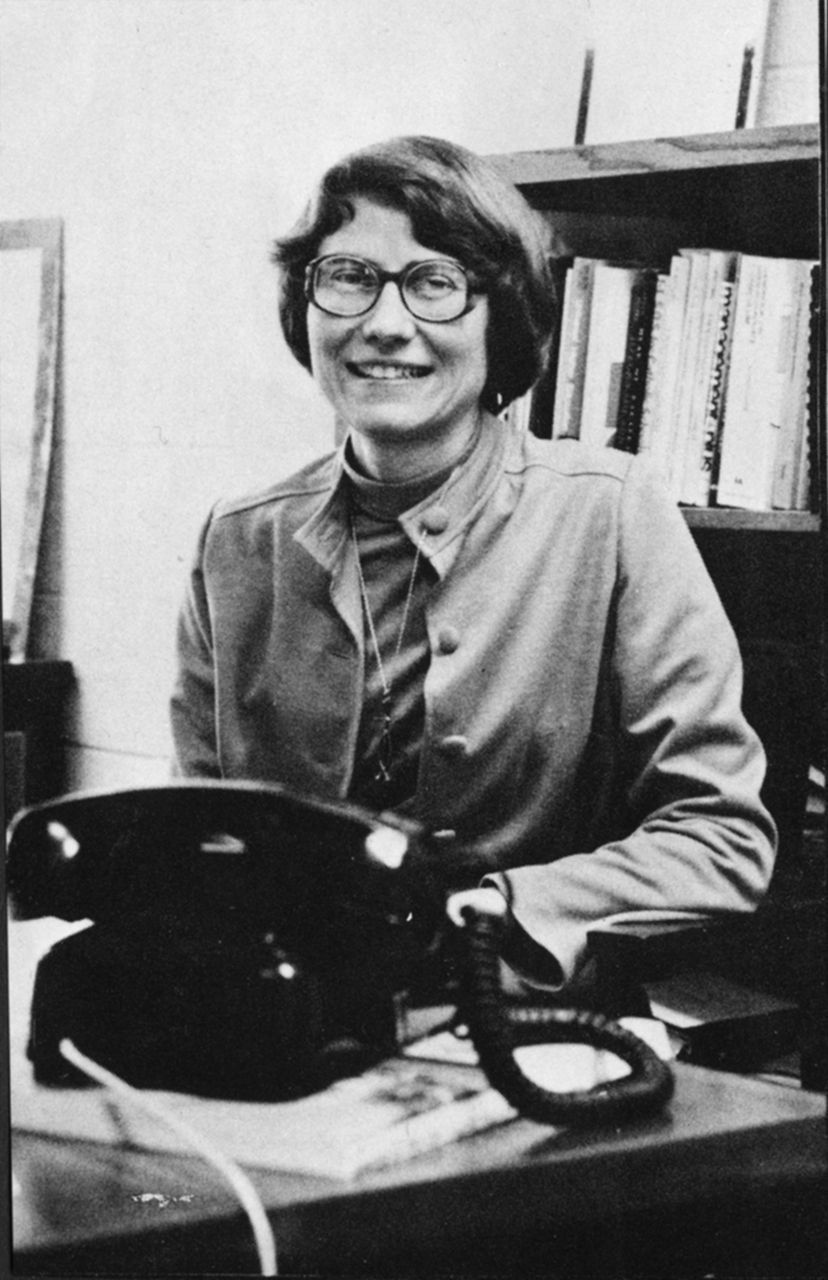
Welder on her first day as president of the University of Mary in 1978.

Welder began working for Mary College in 1963. She taught music and chaired the humanities department. In 1978 she was named the school's fifth president. The college attained university status in 1986, becoming the University of Mary, and the enrollment increased from 925 students to nearly 3,000. As president, Welder was known for her ability to remember names and faces. She emphasized teaching servant leadership and Benedictine values. In 2004, she was granted the Theodore Roosevelt Rough Rider Award, the highest honor of the state of North Dakota. Her portrait is displayed in the North Dakota State Capitol. In 2009, she retired and was named President Emerita.

== Death ==
Welder had polycystic kidney disease; she received two transplants, in 2001 and in 2011. She died in Bismarck, North Dakota, on June 22, 2020, after having been diagnosed with kidney cancer. The state governor, Doug Burgum, and the senator John Hoeven expressed their condolences. Hoeven and Senator Kevin Cramer memorialized her in floor speeches to the United States Senate on June 24. Monsignor James P. Shea, President of the University of Mary, celebrated Welder's funeral Mass on June 29, and her body was buried in the monastery cemetery.

== Awards and honors ==
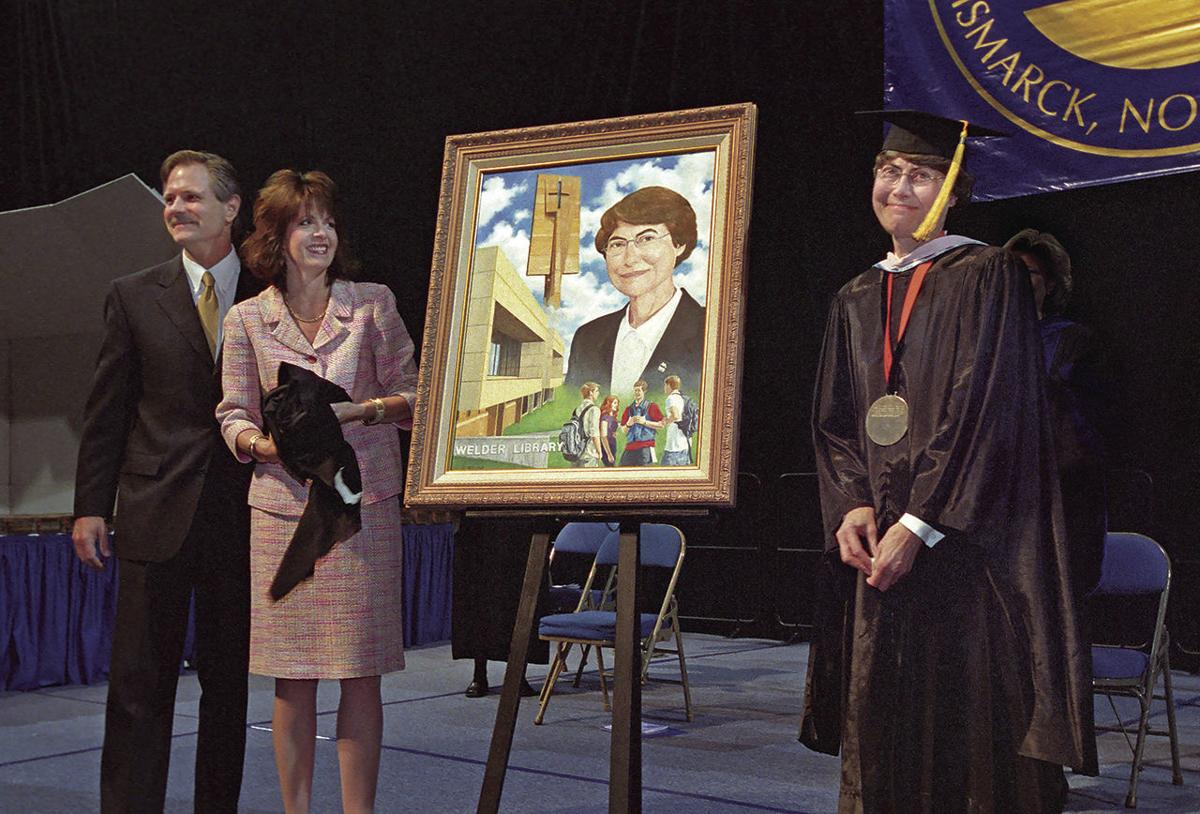
Welder receives the Rough Rider Award from then-Governor John and First Lady Mikey Hoeven (2004).

- Theodore Roosevelt Rough Rider Award from the State of North Dakota – 2004
- Scandinavian-American Hall of Fame of the Norsk Høstfest – 2007 inductee
- Doctor of the University, honoris causa, from the University of Mary – 2010
- Caritas Award from Catholic Charities – 2013
- Honorary doctorate from Belmont Abbey College – 2015
- Honorary doctorate from St. Anselm College – 2017
