= Mr. Bubble =

Brand of bubble bath

- Logo
- Type: Bubble bath
- Inventor: Harold Schafer
- Inception: 1961
- Manufacturer: The Village Company
- Website: https://thevillagecompany.com/pages/mr-bubble

Mr. Bubble is an American brand of bubble bath products manufactured by The Village Company. Created by Harold Schafer in 1961, it is the #1 brand of bubble bath products in the United States. In addition to the flagship bubble bath formula, the line includes body wash, shampoo, conditioner, bath bombs, hand soap and baby wipes. The Mr. Bubble brand became well known for its advertisements, most famously featuring bright and colorful cartoon depictions of the Mr. Bubble character in humorous settings.

== History ==
Mr. Bubble was invented by Harold Schafer who, through his love of helping his children during bath time, envisioned a low cost powdered bubble bath product to be sold at grocery stores and pharmacies. The idea for the name "Mr. Bubble" came after Schafer heard a late-night radio ad for foam cleaner Mr. Clean.

It was first manufactured by his Gold Seal Company in North Dakota in 1961 and sold for 59 cents ($5.85 in 2022). Due to the cost being too high for the intended market of families at the time, the product quickly flopped. After working with suppliers to lower the cost to 39 cents ($3.86 in 2022 money), combined with its now famous commercials, Mr. Bubble soon catapulted to worldwide success. In 1972, the company introduced the now-standard liquid bubble bath bottles.

Gold Seal continued to manufacture and distribute Mr. Bubble until 1986 when it was sold to Airwick Industries, then a division of Reckitt & Colman. R&C sold the brand to J. W. Childs Assoc. as a part of their Personal Care Group, Inc., and Playtex Products acquired the Personal Care Group in 1997. Ascendia Brands, Inc. purchased Mr. Bubble in 2005 from Playtex Products. Ascendia Brands, Inc. later filed for bankruptcy, which was when The Village Company acquired the Mr. Bubble brand in August 2008.

In 2011, Mr. Bubble celebrated its 50th anniversary with a party at the North Dakota State Capitol hosted by former governor Ed Schafer, the son of Harold Schafer, as well as a redesigned mascot.

== Appearances in popular media ==
- In the Family Guy episode "If I'm Dyin', I'm Lyin'", the Griffin family is being cursed with the ten biblical plagues. This includes the tub water ominously turning to blood, to which an enraptured Stewie Griffin comments, "How positively delightful! It's as if someone stabbed Mr. Bubble!"
- In The Simpsons episode "My Sister, My Sitter", Lisa tells Bart that he can use Mr. Bubble to wash his hands and says "It's like giving your fingers a bubble bath."
- Eddie Murphy mentions it on his 1983 TV stand-up show Eddie Murphy Delirious.
- It is also mentioned in the 1987 film Gold Through the Fire.
- It is conspicuously placed sticking out the top of a grocery sack as it is being carried in the house in the 1996 comedy film Ed starring Matt LeBlanc.
- The powdered version can be seen in Everybody Loves Raymond, Season 3 Episode 17, while Frank is in the hot tub.
- The powdered version can also be seen in the 1982 horror film The Entity, when Carla Moran (Barbara Hershey) is going to take a hot bath.
- Mr. Bubble makes a cameo behind the head of Navin Johnson (Steve Martin) during a bathroom scene in the movie The Jerk.
- Mr. Bubble can be seen behind the Dude (Jeff Bridges) in The Big Lebowski.
- Mr. Bubble made an appearance in the Clint Eastwood film Gran Torino.
- Mr. Bubble is the subject of a segment in the season 9 episode of Robot Chicken "Why Is It Wet?"
