= Era Bell Thompson =

American journalist

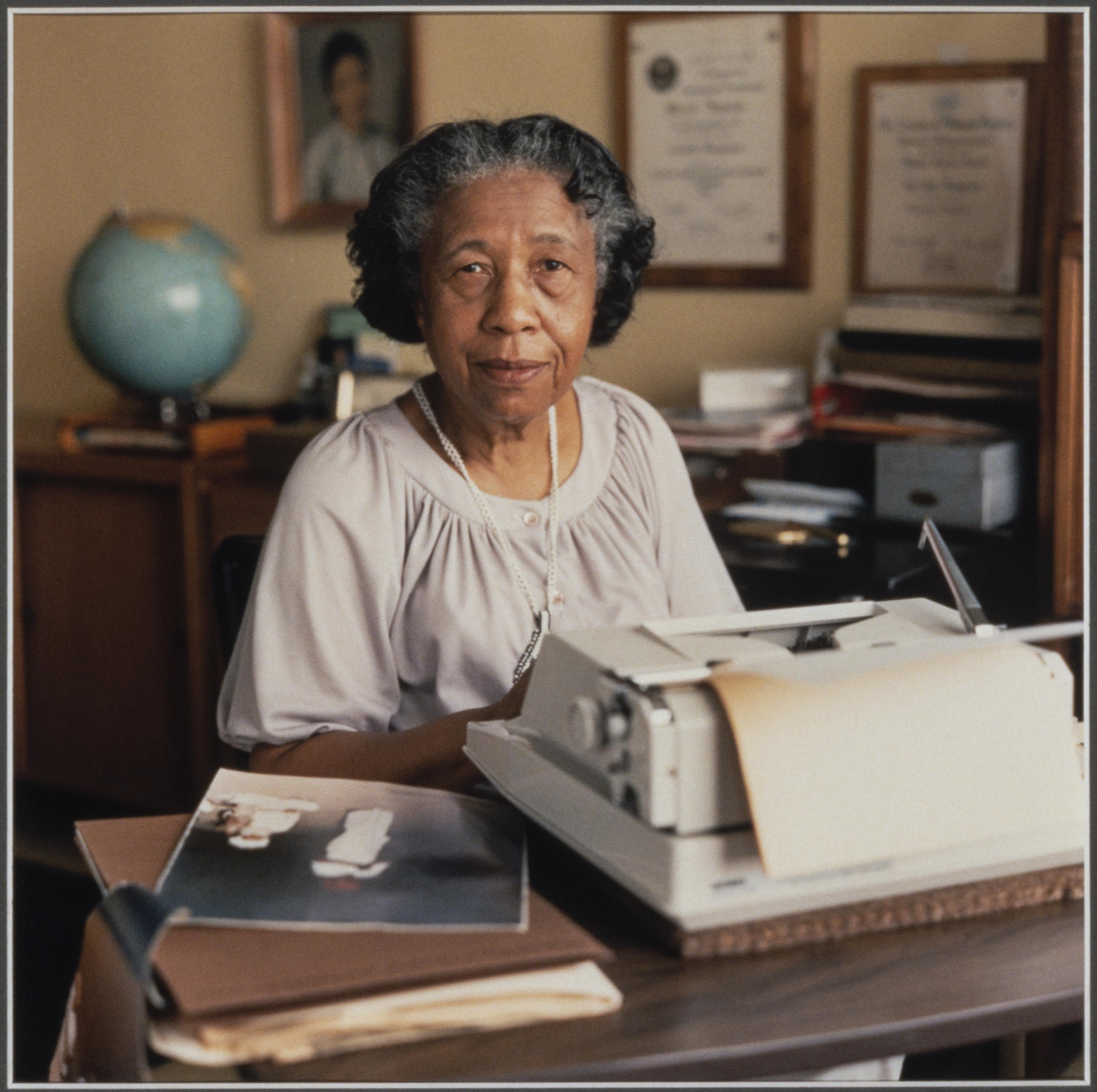
- Portrait of Era Bell Thompson from the collection of Black Women Oral History Project.
- Born: Era Bell Thompson; August 10, 1905; Des Moines, Iowa
- Died: December 30, 1986 (aged 81); Chicago, Illinois
- Education: Morningside College
- Occupations: Writer, editor
- Awards: Roughrider Award

Era Bell Thompson (August 10, 1905 – December 30, 1986) was an American writer and editor.

Thompson was born in Des Moines, Iowa, to an African American family, the only daughter of Steward "Tony" Thompson and Mary Logan Thompson, the children of formerly enslaved people. She graduated from the University of North Dakota (UND), pursued a career as an author, and was a long-time editor and journalist for Ebony magazine in Chicago.

Thompson was a recipient of the governor of North Dakota's Roughrider Award, and a multicultural center at UND is named for her.

== Early years ==
In 1914, her parents moved Thompson and her three brothers to Driscoll, North Dakota, where they were the only black family in the small community, and she and her brothers were often the only African-Americans in the schools they attended. Thompson would find herself in similar situations for much of her youth and into early adulthood. She wrote years later of her ignorance of blacks before she moved to Chicago following her graduation from college.

Thompson graduated from Bismarck High, where she had excelled in sports and pursued journalism, often to cope with the isolation she often felt. She enrolled at the University of North Dakota in 1925, and she excelled in track and field, breaking several school records, tying two national records, and earning the distinction of being one of the state's greatest athletes. However, during her second year of college, an extended bout with pleurisy left her too debilitated to run track and forced her to leave school.

She moved to Chicago and worked in a variety of short-lived clerical jobs before landing one at a magazine. For three months and for a pay of ten dollars a week, she "learned how to run a magazine on hope, patience, and a very worn shoe string; to proofread and write advertising copy—and keep warm by burning magazines in an old fireplace," Thompson writes in her autobiography. After an illness to her father she was forced to return to North Dakota, where she worked for the Rev. Robert O'Brian family.

== Literary career ==
She returned to college with the support of the Rev. Robert O'Brian family and received a B.A. degree from Morningside College in Sioux City, Iowa. Returning to Chicago, she did postgraduate work at Northwestern University's Medill School of Journalism. Initially unable to find a job in journalism, Thompson worked a number of small clerical jobs while continuing to write small personal writing projects and, thanks in part to a fellowship from Newberry Library, an autobiography. Published in 1946, it is entitled American Daughter.

In 1947, Thompson came to the attention of Johnson Publishing Company publisher of Negro Digest and Ebony. After a stint writing for the Digest, she joined Ebony magazine as associate editor. Two years after becoming co-managing editor, she began her foreign reporting in 1953. She was instrumental in shaping Ebony magazine's vision and guiding its coverage for approximately forty years while serving in a variety of editorial capacities.

In 1954, she published a second book, Africa, Land of My Fathers, based on a tour of 18 countries in Africa. Thompson was still listed as an editor of Ebony in 1985, an indication of her longevity with the publication. She was praised for her efforts in promoting both racial and gender understanding. She died in Chicago on December 30, 1986.

In 2020, Thompson was inducted into the Chicago Literary Hall of Fame.

== Bibliography ==
- Thompson, Era Bell (1946). American Daughter (Chicago: The University of Chicago Press, 119.
- Thompson, Era Bell (1954). Africa: Land of My Fathers. (Garden City, N.Y.: Doubleday).
- Thompson, Era Bell; Nipson, Herbert (1963). White on black; the views of twenty-two white Americans on the Negro. Edited by Era Bell Thompson and Herbert Nipson, editors of Ebony magazine. Chicago: Johnson Publishing Co. OCLC 910396067.
- Thompson, Era Bell (1967). "Surinam: Multicultural Paradise at the Crossroads". Ebony. 12 (4): 112+. OCLC 775274807.
- Thompson, Era Bell (1950). "Negro Publications and the Writer". Phylon. 11 (4): 304–306. doi:10.2307/272358. JSTOR 272358.
- Thompson, Era Bell (July 1966). "Australia: Its White Policy and the Negro". Ebony: 46–56. OCLC 953916009.
