= Harold Schafer =

American businessman (1912–2001)

- Born: February 1, 1912; Stanton, North Dakota, U.S.
- Died: December 2, 2001 (aged 89); Bismarck, North Dakota, U.S.
- Education: Bismarck High School; North Dakota State University
- Occupations: Businessperson; Founder, Gold Seal Company; Founder, Theodore Roosevelt Medora Foundation
- Known for: Revitalization of Medora, North Dakota
- Spouse(s): Marian Nelsen (1935 - ???); Sheila Barbara Chinn Limond(1965 - 2016)
- Children: Ed Schafer
- Awards: Horatio Alger Award; Rough Rider Award

Harold Schafer (February 1, 1912 – December 2, 2001) was a North Dakota businessman, entrepreneur and philanthropist who founded the Gold Seal Company, the original maker of Mr. Bubble. He also was a major benefactor in the tourist town of Medora, North Dakota and the Medora Musical.

== Background ==
Schafer was born on a small farm near Stanton, North Dakota the second of three children born to Edward and Bertha Schafer. His brother Gordon was born in 1911, his sister Ethelwyn in 1916. Harold spoke only German at home until he went to elementary school.

During his school years, the family moved repeatedly. In 1919, the Schafers moved from the farm near Stanton to another small farm near Hazen, then to Killdeer in 1920 and to Bismarck in 1922. Harold next spent a considerable period of time with his mother's family near Rosebud, South Dakota. In 1924, when Schafer was 12 years old, his father left the family and Harold moved back to Bismarck to live with his mother. He and his mother subsequently moved to Jamestown, then to Glen Ullin and finally back to Bismarck in 1927. Schafer graduated from Bismarck High School.

During this period in his life, Schafer took his first paid job at the age of eight working in a butcher shop in Killdeer. When his family moved to Bismarck he worked as a newspaper boy, did janitorial work and was employed as a gas station attendant. In Jamestown he candled eggs, sold flowers and worked as a department store clerk. In Glen Ullin he worked on a threshing crew, and by the time he was back in Bismarck and graduating from high school, Schafer did odd jobs at the Dahl clothing store, was an usher at the Capitol Theater, a bellhop at the Patterson Hotel, and an attendant at the Standard Oil Service Station. He also delivered milk, shoveled snow and was offered a job as a salesman at Bergeson's clothing store.

In 1929, Schafer enrolled at the North Dakota State Agricultural College (now NDSU) in Fargo. He continued to work at multiple jobs and once again his employment included work as a salesman, this time at the Globe Clothing Company. Schafer left college after one year and hit the road as a traveling salesman. By 1931, at the age of 19, he returned to Bismarck where once again he found work at the Dahl Clothing Store. Schafer was forced to take a job at a clothing store in Glasgow, Montana, almost immediately after his first wedding but, by January 1, 1936, he was back in Bismarck and working for Vantine's Paint and Glass. He switched to Fargo Glass and Paint in November 1936 and then worked for that company as a traveling salesman for several years.

== Gold Seal Company ==
In 1942, Schafer started packaging and selling a product he called Gold Seal Floor Wax. He personally typed the labels by hand and taped them onto old cans in his basement and, thus, Gold Seal Company was born. In the spring of 1943, Harold resigned his job at Fargo Glass and Paint to pursue his new dream, only to discover that the few hundred dollars that he had expected to have available for the purpose of starting the company did not materialize. At that point the family had three small children, no job and no money, and his new company had no assets.

In 1943, his Gold Seal Company made a profit of $901.02, and Schafer borrowed money from friends to keep going. The company grew modestly at first but, in 1945 introduced a new product called Glass Wax. Sales increased dramatically and then suddenly boomed when, in 1948, Glass Wax went national. The success of Glass Wax was repeated again in the 1950s with Snowy Bleach and in the 1960s with Mr. Bubble. Each of these became the number one selling product in their respective categories, and the Gold Seal Company continued to produce increasing sales and profits until it was sold to Airwick Industries in 1986.

== Later years ==
After selling his Gold Seal interests, Schafer reinvested much of his assets in the Theodore Roosevelt Medora Foundation to promote and preserve Medora's Western culture. Schafer was honored for this benefaction with the Rough Rider Award, North Dakota's highest civilian honor.

He purchased the Rough Riders Hotel and the Ferris Store in 1962 and began renovating them in 1963. Other renovations and improvements soon followed and, in 1965, the Medora Division of the Gold Seal Company was opened to the public. Schafer was enthralled with Medora and its fascinating history, and continued to pour his money and his efforts into this project. Medora eventually developed into the largest recreational area in the state of North Dakota. When the Gold Seal Company was sold in 1986, the family donated the Medora assets to the newly formed Theodore Roosevelt Medora Foundation.

A number of awards were bestowed on Schafer for his philanthropy, but he also became the youngest person ever to win the Horatio Alger award. In 1972, Shafer received the Golden Plate Award from the American Academy of Achievement, presented by Council Chairman Lowell Thomas at an awards ceremony, in Salt Lake City, Utah. In 1975, he was awarded the state's highest honor, the Theodore Roosevelt Rough Rider Award by Governor Arthur Albert Link. In 1995, he was inducted into the DeMolay International Hall of Fame.

The Harold Schafer Leadership Center was established at the University of Mary in 1997 by the university's then-president Sister Thomas Welder.

A collection of Native American artifacts which he assembled is displayed in the Museum of the Badlands in Medora. A Theodore Roosevelt Badlands Institute has been planned for Medora, and the artifact collection would be housed within the Institute's facility.

== Personal life ==
On September 22, 1935, he married Marian Nelsen of Aberdeen, South Dakota. The couple had five children, Haroldeen, Joanne, Dianne, Ed, and Pam. On May 9, 1965, Harold married Sheila Barbara Chinn Limond. She had three children - Mark, Michelle, and Maureen. He was the father of Ed Schafer who was the former United States Secretary of Agriculture and North Dakota governor (1992 to 2000).

Harold Schafer died December 2, 2001, in a Bismarck hospital after an extended illness, aged 89. A memorial service was held at Trinity Lutheran Church in Bismarck.
