= Erling Nicolai Rolfsrud =

American writer and educator (1912–1994)

Erling Nicolai Rolfsrud (September 3, 1912 – August 21, 1994) was a teacher and writer from North Dakota. His writing particularly covered the history of the state of North Dakota and the Norwegian-American immigrant community.

== Early life and teaching career ==
Rolfsrud was born near Keene, North Dakota to Nils (1878–1920) and Rebecca Rolfsrud (1875–1935), Norwegian immigrant homesteaders. He graduated from Watford City, North Dakota. After attending a summer term at Minot State Teachers College (now Minot State University), Rolfsrud taught three terms of rural school in McKenzie County. During his time teaching at Rocky Glen School, Rolfsrud sold his first children's story. Later, he would go on to graduate from Concordia College, Moorhead, Minnesota. He taught in secondary schools, then headed the department of business education at Concordia for five years. He retired in 1978 to devote full-time to writing.

== Writing ==
Rolfsrud was a regular columnist in several North Dakota weekly newspapers and the author of 31 published books. For two years he was associate editor of "The North Dakota Teacher." He wrote his column, "The Top Drawer," for that publication for 22 years. Church, home, farm and education journals and magazines have published his stories and articles. He did freelance writing for 11 years, qualifying for membership in the Authors' League of America in 1952. During the 1952–53 school years, he was a lyceum lecturer in the North Dakota schools. He has spoken to varied audiences: high school commencements, church and community groups, education conventions and workshops and historical societies.

Rolfsrud was recipient of the Red River Valley Historical Society's Pioneer Historian Award and of the Concordia College Alumni Achievement Award in 1974. In 1989, Rolfsrud was inducted into the Scandinavian-American Hall of Fame. In 1991, the Red River Valley Heritage Society presented him with their Lake Agassiz Publication Award.

== Personal life ==
In 1941, he married Beverly Brown (1920–2015). Rolfsrud died August 21, 1994, in Farwell, Minnesota, where he resided with his wife on Lake Rachel.

== Selected works ==
- ’’Lanterns Over the Prairies’’ (1949)
- Gopher Tales for Papa (1951)
- Brother to the Eagle (1952)
- The borrowed sister: The story of Elisabeth Fedde (1953)
- Extraordinary North Dakotans (1954)
- Boy from Johnny Butte (1956)
- Indians of the Upper Midwest (1971)
- The Story of North Dakota (1972)
- The Tiger-Lily Years (1975)
- Cutbank Girl (1985)
