= Good Samaritan Society =

The Good Samaritan Society / Good Samaritan Canada (GSS) is a Canadian Lutheran social service organization that provides continuing care, assisted living and other health and community care services to the independent elderly, frail elderly, mentally challenged, physically challenged, and chronically ill. It is one of the largest not-for-profit, voluntary care providers in Alberta and British Columbia.

The Good Samaritan Society serves over 7,500 individuals with 29 locations throughout Alberta and British Columbia.

== History ==
The society was created in 1949 and built its first facility, a long-term care hospital in 1955. Since then, GSS has developed five continuing care centres, four assisted living facilities, and an apartment building for independent seniors in the greater Edmonton area. Wedman House, which officially opened April 1994, was the first assisted living facility in Canada.

In 2001, the society expanded outside of the greater Edmonton area into smaller communities in Alberta and British Columbia. GSS has opened programs in Medicine Hat, Lethbridge, Pincher Creek, Magrath, Stony Plain, Hinton, Evansburg, and Rocky Mountain House in Alberta, and Kelowna, Penticton, Vernon, Salmon Arm, New Westminster, Gibsons and Nanaimo in British Columbia. Facilities are under construction in Taber, Raymond and Cardston, Alberta.

== Organization ==
A volunteer board of directors governs GSS as a not-for-profit health and social services organization. Registered in Alberta and British Columbia, the society is owned by members who qualify for membership status.

There are 3,500 full-time, part-time, and casual employees and more than 1600 volunteers.

== Programs and services ==
Service areas include independent living, assisted living, complex/continuing care, programs for persons with development disabilities, Telecare, personal emergency response services, rehabilitative services, community care programs and day programs.

The Good Samaritan Society has developed a cottage program for persons with Alzheimer's disease and other dementia. The society runs community programs, such as day programs and shared living that seeks to assist people in their own homes and communities.
