= Clint Hill (Secret Service agent) =

U.S. Secret Service agent (1932–2025)

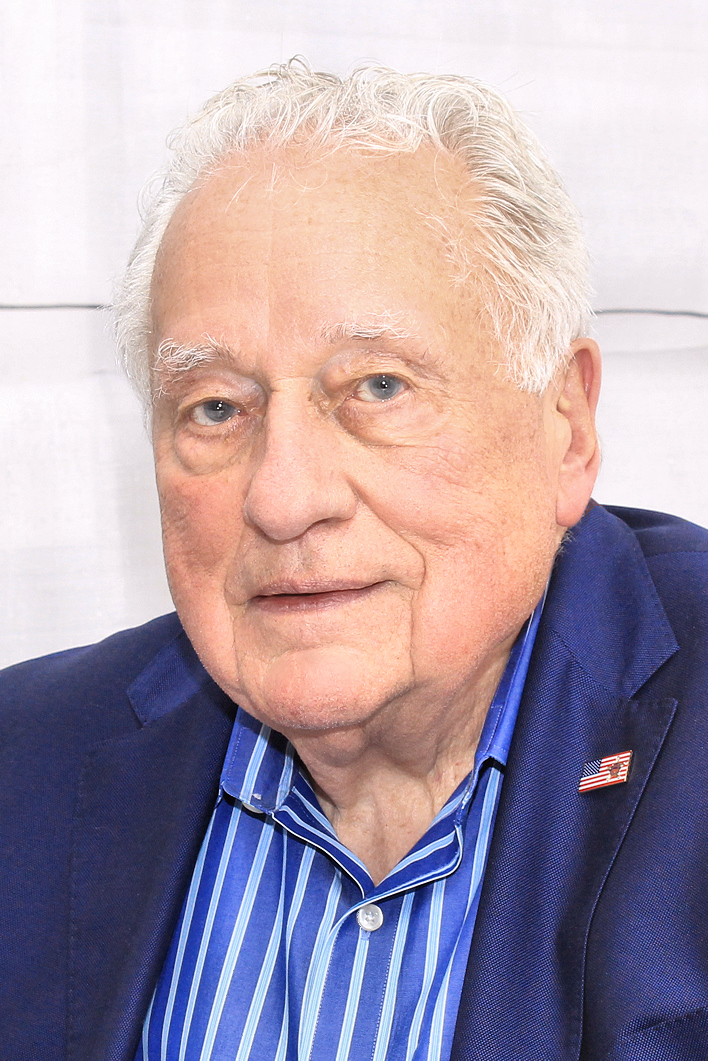
- Hill in 2016
- Born: Clinton Jerome Hill; January 4, 1932; Larimore, North Dakota, U.S.
- Died: February 21, 2025 (aged 93); Belvedere, California, U.S.
- Resting place: Arlington National Cemetery, Arlington County, Virginia, U.S.
- Education: Concordia College
- Occupation: U.S. Secret Service agent
- Years active: 1958–1975
- Spouses: Gwen Hill (divorced) Lisa McCubbin (m. 2021)
- Children: 2

Clinton Jerome Hill (January 4, 1932 – February 21, 2025) was a United States Secret Service agent who served under five U.S. presidents, from Dwight D. Eisenhower to Gerald Ford. Hill is best known for his act of bravery on November 22, 1963, when President John F. Kennedy was assassinated in Dallas, Texas. During the assassination, Hill ran into the line of fire from the Secret Service follow-up car, leaped onto the back of the presidential car, and shielded the stricken president and first lady Jacqueline Kennedy with his own body as the car raced to Parkland Memorial Hospital. His act was documented in film footage by Abraham Zapruder. Hill was the last surviving person who was inside the presidential limousine on November 22, 1963.

== Early life and education ==
Hill was born in Larimore, North Dakota, to a Norwegian mother, Alma Petersen. His birth parents homesteaded near Roseglen. "At 17 days old his Mother, (separated from his father), had him baptized and she then placed him in the North Dakota Children's Home in Fargo. After three months, he was adopted by another Norwegian family, Chris and Jennie Hill of Fargo. Originally named Haugen, the family later changed its name to the English version of the name; Haugen means "the hill" in Norwegian.

Hill's new family took him to Washburn, where he eventually graduated from Washburn High School. He attended Concordia College in Moorhead, Minnesota, where he played football, basketball, and baseball, studied history, and graduated in 1954. Shortly after graduating from college he was drafted into the US Army and sent to Ft. Leonard Wood, Missouri, for basic training. After basic training he was assigned to the United States Army Intelligence Center in Dundalk, Maryland, where he was trained as a Counterintelligence (CI) Special Agent and served with Region IX, 113th Counterintelligence Corps Field Office in Denver, until 1957.

After his military service, Hill joined the Secret Service and was assigned to the Denver office. In 1958, Hill served on the detail for President Dwight D. Eisenhower. After John F. Kennedy was elected president of the United States, Hill was assigned to protect the new First Lady, Jacqueline Kennedy.

== Assassination of President Kennedy ==
President Kennedy was assassinated on November 22, 1963, in Dallas, Texas, during a motorcade through the city, en route to a luncheon at the Dallas Trade Mart. The President and Mrs. Kennedy were riding in an open limousine containing three rows of seats. The Kennedys were in the rear seat of the car, the governor of Texas, John Connally, and his wife, Nellie Connally, were in the middle row, Secret Service agent William Greer was driving and the Assistant Special Agent in Charge, Roy Kellerman, was also in the front row.

Clint Hill jumping on the presidential limousine, as captured in the Zapruder film

Hill was riding on the left front running board of the Secret Service car immediately behind the presidential limousine. He heard what seemed to him to be a firecracker coming from his right, and as he was turning his head he noticed President Kennedy had been wounded. He then jumped across onto the bumper of the limousine and on reaching it heard a second shot which he said sounded different from the first and like "someone was shooting a revolver into a hard object" which echoed.

Hill, along with Secret Service agents Kellerman, Greer, and Rufus Youngblood, provided testimony to the Warren Commission in Washington, D.C., on March 9, 1964.

Hill grabbed a small handrail on the left rear of the trunk, normally used by bodyguards to stabilize themselves while standing on small platforms on the rear bumper. According to the Warren Commission's findings, there were no bodyguards stationed on the bumper that day because:

...the President had frequently stated that he did not want agents to ride on these steps during a motorcade except when necessary. He had repeated this wish only a few days before, during his visit to Tampa, Florida.

The notion that the president's instructions in Tampa jeopardized his security in Dallas has since been denied by Hill and other agents. Regardless of the Warren Commission's findings, photos taken of the motorcade along earlier segments of the route show Hill riding on the step at the back of the car.

As an alternative explanation, fellow agent Gerald Blaine cites the location of the shooting:

We were going into a freeway, and that's where you take the speeds up to 60 and 70 miles an hour. So we would not have had any agents there anyway.

Hill grabbed the handrail less than two seconds after the fatal shot to the President. The driver then accelerated, causing the car to slip away from Hill, who was in the midst of trying to leap onto it. He succeeded in regaining his footing and jumped onto the back of the quickly accelerating vehicle.

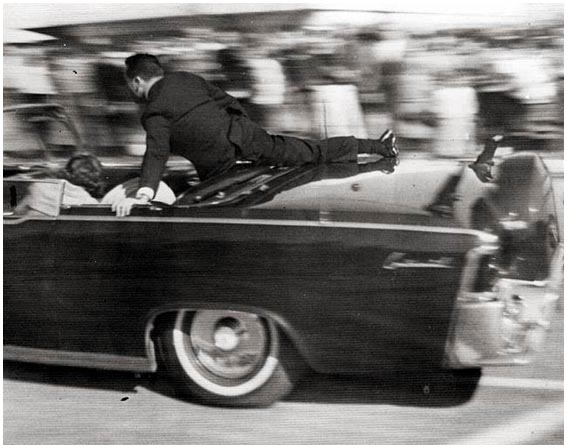
Hill on the presidential limousine moments after Kennedy's assassination

As he got on, Mrs. Kennedy, apparently in shock, was crawling onto the flat rear trunk of the moving limousine. Hill later told the Warren Commission that he thought Mrs. Kennedy was reaching for a piece of the President's skull that had been blown off. He crawled to her and guided her back into her seat. Once back in the car, Hill placed his body above the President and Mrs. Kennedy. Meanwhile, in the folding jump seats directly in front of them, Mrs. Connally had pulled her wounded husband, Governor John Connally, to a prone position on her lap.

Agent Kellerman, in the front seat of the car, gave orders over the car's two-way radio to the lead vehicle in the procession "to the nearest hospital, quick!" Hill was shouting as loudly as he could: "To the hospital, to the hospital!" En route to the hospital, Hill flashed a "thumbs-down" signal and shook his head from side to side at the agents in the follow-up car, signaling the graveness of the President's condition.

The limousine then rapidly exited Dealey Plaza and sped to Parkland Memorial Hospital, only minutes away, followed by other vehicles in the motorcade. Hill maintained his position shielding the couple with his body, and was looking down at the President. He later testified:

The right rear portion of his head was missing. It was lying in the rear seat of the car. His brain was exposed. There was blood and bits of brain all over the entire rear portion of the car. Mrs. Kennedy was completely covered with blood. There was so much blood you could not tell if there had been any other wound or not, except for the one large gaping wound in the right rear portion of the head.

As the hospital staff attended to Kennedy and Connally, Hill received a telephone call from Attorney General Robert F. Kennedy, the President's brother. Hill declined to tell Kennedy over the phone that his brother was dead, saying in a 2013 interview: "I explained to him that both the President and the governor had been shot and that we were in the emergency room at Parkland Hospital. So then he said, 'Well, how bad is it?' Well, I didn't want to tell him his brother was dead. I didn't think it was my place. So I said, 'It's as bad as it can get.'"

Although the Secret Service was shocked at its failure to protect the life of President Kennedy, virtually everyone agreed that Clint Hill's rapid and brave actions had been without blemish. He was honored at a ceremony in Washington just days after the funeral of John F. Kennedy. Mrs. Kennedy, despite being in deep mourning, made an appearance at the event to thank him in person.

== After the assassination ==
Hill remained assigned to Mrs. Kennedy and the children until after the 1964 presidential election. He then was assigned to President Lyndon B. Johnson at the White House. In 1967, when Johnson was still in office, Hill became the Special Agent in Charge (SAC) of presidential protection. When Richard Nixon came into office, Hill moved over to SAC of protection of Vice President Spiro Agnew. Finally, Hill was assigned to headquarters as the assistant director of the Secret Service for all protection. He retired in 1975.

Hill expressed his belief in the official conclusion that Lee Harvey Oswald acted alone and rejected conspiracy theories surrounding the assassination. In a 1975 interview with Mike Wallace, Hill tearfully surmised that if he had reached the vehicle a second earlier, he would have been able to take the third shot to his own body, and felt a great deal of regret for not having been able to reach there in time.

Following the death of Nellie Connally in 2006, Hill was the last surviving person in the car. He wrote the foreword to Gerald Blaine and Lisa McCubbin's 2010 narrative, The Kennedy Detail.

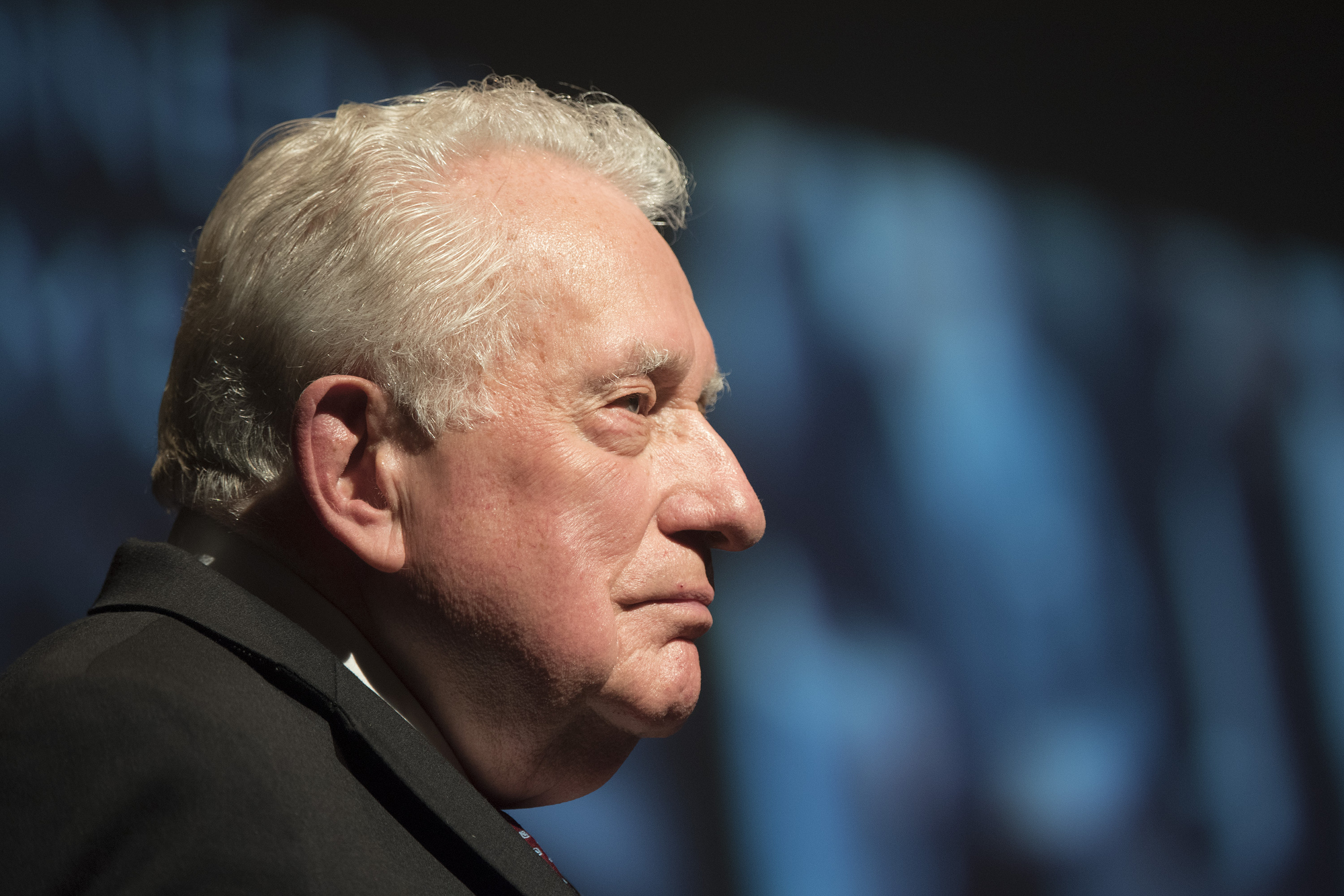
Clint Hill at the LBJ Presidential Library in 2017

In a BBC Today interview, broadcast in December 2010, Hill recalled the assassination and his first visit to Dallas in 1990 since the events of 1963, during which he surveyed the scene of the shooting. Asked whether he thought that the President's life might have been saved if things had been done differently, Hill replied that "He [Lee Harvey Oswald] had all the advantages that day. We had none. And it was a very easy job to accomplish because of the way everything was laid out."

Hill was interviewed by Brian Lamb on C-SPAN's talk show Q&A in May 2012.

In April 2012, the book Mrs. Kennedy and Me was published, in which Hill looked back at his career and described his working relationship with Jacqueline Kennedy. The same year, Hill was inducted into the Scandinavian-American Hall of Fame, a signature event of the North Dakota-based organization Norsk Høstfest.

In 2012, Hill was reported to have lived in Alexandria, Virginia, for "many years."

In November 2013, to coincide with the 50th anniversary of the assassination, Hill's book Five Days in November was published, giving his view of the events.

In 2016, Hill released Five Presidents: My Extraordinary Journey with Eisenhower, Kennedy, Johnson, Nixon, and Ford, which summarized his entire Secret Service career.

On October 5, 2018, Hill received the Theodore Roosevelt Rough Rider Award from Doug Burgum, the Governor of North Dakota. The award is North Dakota's award for residents and former residents of North Dakota.

== Personal life and death ==
Hill was married to his wife Gwen at the time of Kennedy's assassination. The couple had two sons. In his 2012 interview with Brian Lamb, Hill suggested that he had been divorced or separated from her for several years. As of 2013, Hill lived near San Francisco. Since 2016, Hill had been in a relationship with his co-author, Lisa McCubbin. They were married in December 2021.

Hill died at his home in Belvedere, California, on February 21, 2025, aged 93. The Secret Service said that "Clint's career exemplified the highest ideals of public service... We mourn the loss of a respected colleague and a dear friend whose contributions to the agency and the nation will forever be remembered." He was laid to rest at Arlington National Cemetery on June 18, 2026.

== Bibliography ==
- Hill, Clint; McCubbin, Lisa (2012). Mrs. Kennedy and Me. S&S/Gallery. ISBN 978-1-4516-4844-7.
- Hill, Clint; McCubbin, Lisa (2013). Five Days in November. S&S/Gallery.
- Hill, Clint; McCubbin, Lisa (2016). Five Presidents: My Extraordinary Journey with Eisenhower, Kennedy, Johnson, Nixon, and Ford. S&S/Gallery. ISBN 978-1476794136.
