= Brynhild Haugland =

American politician (1905–1998)

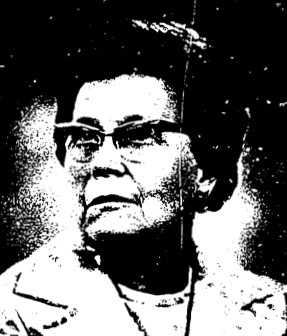

Member of the North Dakota House of Representatives from the Minot district
- In office December 1, 1938 – December 1, 1990

Personal details
- Born: July 28, 1905
- Died: August 9, 1998 (aged 93)
- Party: Republican

Brynhild Haugland (July 28, 1905 – August 9, 1998) was an American Republican politician, who was well known for being one of the first female legislators in the North Dakota Legislative Assembly, as well as for being the longest serving state legislator in the history of the United States because of her continuous 52-year tenure in the North Dakota House of Representatives. Fred A. Risser retired in 2021 as the longest serving state legislator in United States history.

== Biography ==
Haugland was born in 1905 near Minot, North Dakota, the daughter of Norwegian immigrants Nels and Sigurda (Ringeon) Haugland, who were dairy farmers. She taught in Ward County from 1923 to 1925 and received her teaching certificate in 1928 from what is now Minot State University. Her political career began in 1936 when she first ran a Minot district House of Representatives seat, however, she was unable to win because a broken leg kept her from campaigning. She tried again in 1938 for the same seat, and this time was successful. She held the same seat without ever losing an election until her retirement in 1990 at age 85. During her tenure, she even was dropped from the Republican Party in 1962, but still won the primary as an independent, however two years later she was accepted back into the party. Haugland missed very few votes during her time in office, and voted an estimated 22,000 times in all during her service.

During her time in office, Haugland's main focus was on improving education and a commitment to aiding farmers. She successfully helped Minot State University acquire 10 new buildings. Haugland's efforts to improve farmer's problems and living conditions was recognized by former first lady Eleanor Roosevelt in her book, Ladies of Courage (New York, Putnam. 1954), when she wrote "Go down the list of laws passed by the North Dakota legislature in the last 15 years to help meet the farmer's problems and improve his living conditions, and you will find that Brynhild Haugland had a hand in every one of them."

Haugland died at the age of 93 in 1998.

== Awards and recognition ==
- In 1984, Brynhild Haugland was awarded an honorary degree (LL.D.) from the North Dakota State University.
- In 1984, Haugland was among the first class of inductees in the Scandinavian-American Hall of Fame held in Minot, N.D.
- In 1988, Haugland was one of the two award winners in the Public Service category of the Council for Advancement and Support of Education (CASE).
- On March 20, 1995, the State of North Dakota recognized Haugland for her time of public service by awarding her the state's highest honor, the Theodore Roosevelt Roughrider Award.
