= Gilmore Schjeldahl =

American businessman and inventor

- Born: June 1, 1912; Esmond, North Dakota, US
- Died: March 10, 2002 (aged 89); Lenox, Massachusetts, US
- Resting place: South Pleasant Cemetery, Christine, North Dakota
- Spouse: Charlene Hanson
- Children: 5 (including Peter)

Gilmore Tilmen Schjeldahl (June 1, 1912 – March 10, 2002) was an American businessman and inventor in plastics, adhesives and circuitry. He was awarded 16 US patents and may be best known for inventing the plastic-lined airsickness bag. He also founded the Schjeldahl Company, which designed and built Echo I, and worked on Echo II, Project Stargazer, Stratascope II, and PAGEOS. He had five children, including Peter Schjeldahl, a notable art critic, poet, and educator. Schjeldahl died on March 10, 2002, at his home in Lenox, Massachusetts, after battling Alzheimer's disease for many years.

== Biography ==
=== Early life and education ===
Gilmore Tilmen Schjeldahl was born in Esmond, North Dakota, to Norwegian immigrants. His father was a railroad worker. He grew up in Northwood, North Dakota, and did not graduate from high school, but took courses at North Dakota State College of Science and North Dakota State University before being drafted into the U.S. Army to serve during World War II. Schjeldahl served in three battles with the 84th Division, including the Battle of the Bulge, in which his actions were awarded with a Bronze Star.

=== Career ===
==== Herb-Shelly ====
Schjeldahl began his career at Armour and Company, where he began working with polyethylene. Unable to get the material to seal to itself, he and his wife experimented on solutions at home, where they developed a hot knife-sealing process. He left Armour in 1946 and moved to Minneapolis, where he created a bag-making machine in his home. He used the machine to launch his first company, Herb-Shelly, Inc., in 1948. The company moved into a shop the next year in Farmington, Minnesota, and eventually produced a variety of polyethylene packaging materials and plastic bag liners. By 1954, the company had $500,000 annual sales and 100 employees. The company started experimenting with lamination at this time, researching adhesives for a new DuPont polymer called Mylar. The company was also involved in the fabrication of a balloon for the Office of Naval Research at the University of Minnesota. In May 1954, Herb-Shelly was acquired by Brown & Bigelow. Schjeldahl sold the company in 1955, and remained in a corporate capacity for only a short time.

==== Schjeldahl Company ====
On January 21, 1955, Schjeldahl began making plans for a new company to be located in the basement of the Medical Arts building in Northfield, Minnesota. The company secured a contract in April 1955 to create atmospheric research balloons made with Mylar polyester film, held together with an adhesive system that Schjeldahl developed. On September 1, 1955, the G.T. Schjeldahl Company went public. In addition to balloons, the company manufactured bag-making machines and heat-sealing adhesive tape. Eventually the company began developing a line of adhesive tapes for polyester bonding called Schjel-Bond (GT100, GT200, GT300, and GT400).

The G. T. Schjeldahl Company gained national recognition for designing and building Echo I, the first communications satellite. The Schjeldahl Company worked on both the Echo II, Stargazer, and Stratascope II projects, as well as PAGEOS. The company also made the laminate and adhesive materials for the Polaris missile program. These environmental seals, which were called diaphragms, kept water out of the submarine until a missile was released. G. T. Schjeldahl Company products and technology using vacuum deposition and lamination were used on the Pegasus satellite program, putting the company into the vacuum deposition business. The name of the company was changed to Sheldahl, Inc. in 1974 for ease of pronunciation and spelling.

In 2000, Sheldahl, Inc. merged with International Flex Technologies, headquartered in New York. In 2004, Sheldahl was purchased by the Multek Corporation.

==== Giltech and Plastic Netting Machine Company ====
The weakening economy in 1967 lead to a decrease in government supported research. Schjeldahl resigned as chairman of the board and started Giltech, a company which concerned itself primarily with making bottles through the blow molding process. The Giltech Company merged with another plastics company, Rainville, in 1972 to become Rainville, Inc. Eventually Rainville, Inc. merged with and became Universal Dynamics (UnaDyn). In 1970, Schjeldahl also created the Plastic Netting Machine Company. This company developed and produced devices for feeding and filling rigid plastic containers.

==== Cathedyne Corporation ====
In 1978, Schjeldahl suffered a mild heart attack. During his recovery, he pondered techniques for opening up blocked arteries. This led to another business venture, the Cathedyne Corporation. Schjeldahl worked with his cardiologist on improving coronary angioplasty catheters. The Cathedyne Corporation was sold to Angiomedics, Inc., a subsidiary of Pfizer, in 1983.

== Awards ==
- 1962: Alumni Achievement Award, North Dakota State University
- 1970: honorary D.Sc., North Dakota State University
- 1988 : inductee, North Dakota Entrepreneur Hall of Fame
- 1991: inductee, the Scandinavian-American Hall of Fame
- 1993: honorary doctorate, University of North Dakota
