= Norsk Høstfest =

Annual Scandinavian festival in North Dakota

Coordinates: 48°14′09″N 101°15′46″W

Norsk Høstfest (Norwegian for 'Norwegian Autumn Festival') was an annual festival held each fall in Minot, North Dakota, between 1978 and 2025. It was North America's largest Scandinavian festival.

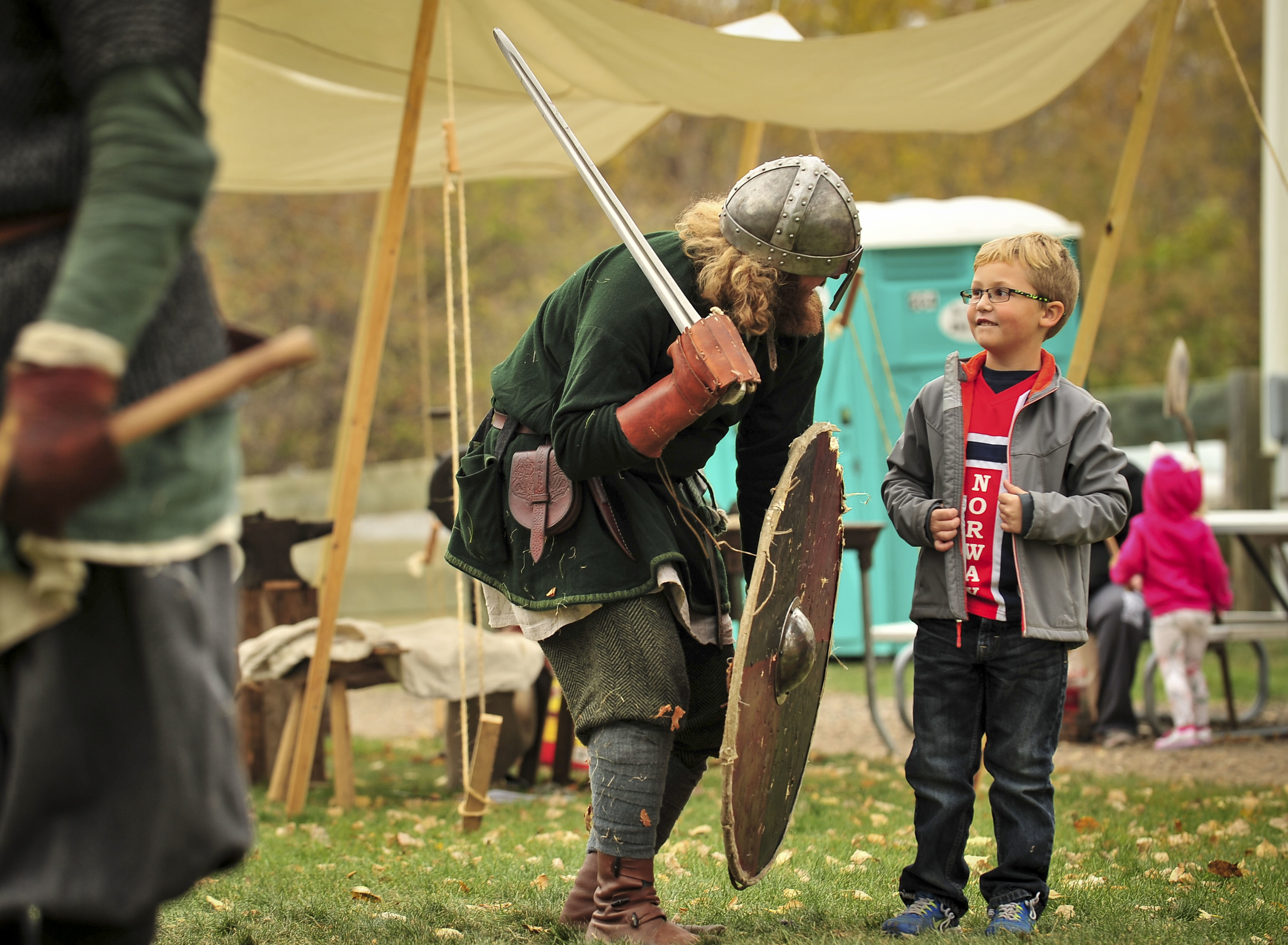
A man dressed as a viking and a young boy, chosen to be his jarl, at Norsk Høstfest in 2015.

== History ==
The event was held on the North Dakota State Fair grounds in Minot, North Dakota. Tens of thousands of people attended to celebrate and partake in the Scandinavian culture and entertainment. Altogether it has hosted cultural touchstones from Iceland, Denmark, Norway, Sweden, Finland, Estonia, Greenland, Åland, Faroe Islands, German-speaking Europe and the Netherlands.

The festival was founded in 1978 by former North Dakota senator and mayor of Minot, Chester Reiten (1923–2013), and a group of friends who shared his interest in celebrating their Nordic heritage. The festival is a 501(c)(3) nonprofit organization that raises funds to preserve, improve and share Scandinavian culture, heritage and educational programs.

The 2020 and 2021 editions of the Høstfest were cancelled due to the COVID-19 global pandemic. On January 29, 2026, it was announced that the festival would no longer continue after the conclusion of the 2025 event due to rising costs and declining attendance.

== Activities ==
Highlights of the festival included announcing the annual Scandinavian-American Hall of Fame inductees. The Hall of Fame is a means of honoring those persons of Scandinavian descent in North America who have achieved greatness in their fields of endeavor and/or whose efforts have contributed significantly to the betterment of mankind.

Other honors included the selection of the annual Miss Norsk Høstfest and naming of the Chester Award, which recognized festival excellence in five categories: artisan, exhibitor, food concessionaire, volunteer and chairman.

Norsk Høstfest featured a number of Nordic exhibits with artisans, craftsmen and chefs participating.

During Høstfest week (the end of September through the first few days of October), presenters associated with the festival traveled to the surrounding area where they introduced Nordic heritage and culture to students in an effort named "Høstfest in the Schools". Additionally, Scandinavian Youth Camp was held the weekend prior to Høstfest. Children participating in the camps also performed at the festival in events such as the troll beauty contest, Norwegian folk dance, Swedish maypole dancers, and the troll parade.

There were several headliner acts booked each night of the event, not limited to the event's Scandinavian theme. Headliners included performers from the United States, Canada and Europe.

== Successor Event ==
Following Norsk Høstfest's 2026 dissolution, the Fjord Folk Fest was established to continue a Scandinavian festival in Minot on a smaller scale. The inaugural event was held August 21–22, 2026. It was so successful, they'll return next 20-21 August 2027 for the 2nd Fjord fest.

== See also ==
- Norwegian Americans

== Additional sources ==
- Olson, Lori; Olson, Jim (1995) Norsk Hostfest: Heritage Comes Alive (Helena, Mt: Farcountry Press) ISBN 978-1560370789
- Emch Paul Thomas (2011) The Norsk Hostfest: A Celebration of Ethnic Food and Ethnic Identity (Dallas, TX: SIL International) ISBN 978-1556712654
