= Aurora Hospital =

- Altru Health System

Geography
- Location: Grand Forks, North Dakota, United States
- Coordinates: 47.877599°N 97.047678°W

Organization
- Type: General

Services
- Beds: 66

History
- Constructed: 2007
- Opened: planned and abandoned

Links
- Lists: Hospitals in North Dakota

Aurora Hospital was to be an independent, physician-owned hospital in Grand Forks, North Dakota. The hospital planning began in 2007 and was to have 66 beds and an initial employment of 200 staff members. It was built on the grounds of the Aurora Medical Park. This medical campus already included existing medical facilities such as The Stadter Center 70-bed psychiatric hospital and a building which housed many independently owned clinics. The building was never completed and operated as Aurora Hospital.

Aurora Hospital was to be a for-profit business, unlike the only existing general hospital in Grand Forks, the non-profit Altru Health System. Prior to completion Aurora Hospital was purchased by Physicians Hospital System from Indiana, then 3 days before opening, Altru Health System purchased the existing facilities and buildings.
