= Missourian =

Missourian may refer to:

- Residents of the state of Missouri in the United States of America
- Missourian (stage), a regional stage in the Carboniferous stratigraphy of North America
- Missourian, an American cargo ship in service 1921-40
- Columbia Missourian, a newspaper in Columbia, Missouri
- Washington Missourian, a newspaper in Washington, Missouri
