= Trinity Health (disambiguation) =

Trinity Health is a healthcare system based in Livonia, Michigan.

Trinity Health may also refer to:

- Trinity Health (Minot, North Dakota)

== See also ==
- Trinity Health Michigan
