= Borror =

Borror is a surname almost exclusively found in the United States where it was adopted by German immigrants as the Americanized spelling of the German occupational surname Bohrer. Notable people with this name include:

- Connie M. Borror (1966–2016), American statistician and industrial engineer
- Donald J. Borror (1907–1988), American entomologist
- Randy Borror (born 1957), American politician
