= List of hospitals in North Dakota =

This list of hospitals in North Dakota shows the existing hospitals in the U.S. state of North Dakota. The sortable list gives the name, city, number of hospital beds, and references for each hospital. In some North Dakota counties where hospitals do not exist, district health units or local clinics are listed.

== Hospitals ==
Hospitals in North Dakota
Name	City	County	Beds, adult trauma level, refs.
Sanford Medical Center	Fargo	Cass	284, I
Altru Health System Hospital	Grand Forks	Grand Forks	262, II
Altru Specialty Center	Grand Forks	Grand Forks	34
Anne Carlsen Center for Children	Jamestown, Devils Lake, Fargo and Grand Forks	Stutsman, Ramsey, Cass, Grand Forks	0
Ashley Medical Center	Ashley	McIntosh	60
CHI St. Alexius Carrington	Carrington	Foster	25, V/Critical Access
Cavalier County Memorial Hospital	Langdon	Cavalier	20
CHI Lisbon Health	Lisbon	Ransom	25
CHI Mercy Health Valley City	Valley City	Barnes	25
CHI Oakes Hospital	Oakes	Dickey	20
CHI St. Alexius Health Beach Family Clinic	Beach	Golden Valley	0
CHI St. Alexius Health Bismarck Medical Center	Bismarck	Burleigh	225, II
CHI St. Alexius Health Carrington Medical Center	Carrington	Foster	25
CHI St. Alexius Health Devils Lake Hospital (Mercy Hospital)	Devils Lake	Ramsey	25
CHI St. Alexius Health Dickinson Medical Center	Dickinson	Stark	25
CHI St. Alexius Health Garrison Memorial Hospital	Garrison	McLean	50
CHI St. Alexius Health Mandan Medical Plaza	Mandan	Morton	0
CHI St. Alexius Health Turtle Lake Hospital (Community Memorial Hospital)	Turtle Lake	McLean	25
CHI St. Alexius Health Williston Medical Center (formerly Mercy Medical Center)	Williston	Williams	25
Cooperstown Medical Center	Cooperstown	Griggs	18
Essentia Health-Fargo Hospital (Essentia Health)	Fargo	Cass	133, II
First Care Health Center	Park River	Walsh	14
Fort Yates Hospital	Fort Yates	Sioux	12
Heart of America Medical Center	Rugby	Pierce	77
Jacobson Memorial Hospital Care Center and Clinic	Elgin	Grant	30
Jamestown Regional Medical Center	Jamestown	Stutsman	25
Kenmare Community Hospital (Trinity Health (Minot, North Dakota))	Kenmare	Ward	25
Kidder County District Health Unit	Steele	Kidder	0
Lake Region Public Health Unit	Devils Lake	Ramsey	0
Linton Hospital and Medical Center	Linton	Emmons	14
McKenzie County Healthcare System	Watford City	McKenzie	71
Morton County Custer Health	Mandan	Morton	0
Mountrail County Health Center	Stanley	Mountrail	11
Nelson County Health System	McVille	Nelson	58
North Dakota State Hospital	Jamestown	Stutsman	108
Northwood Deaconess Health Center	Northwood	Grand Forks	57
Pembina County Memorial Hospital	Cavalier	Pembina	60
Prairie St. John's Psychiatric Center	Fargo	Cass	158
Presentation Medical Center	Rolla	Rolette	25
Quentin N. Burdick Memorial Healtchcare Center	Belcourt	Rolette	27
Red River Behavioral Health System (formerly Stadter Center)	Grand Forks	Grand Forks	70
Sakakawea Medical Center	Hazen	Mercer	13
Sanford Broadway Medical Center (Sanford Health)	Fargo	Cass	20 (expandable to 400)
Sanford Children's Hospital Bismarck (Sanford Health)	Bismarck	Burleigh	
Sanford Children's Hospital Fargo (Sanford Health)	Fargo	Cass	(see Sanford Medical Center Fargo)
Sanford Hillsboro Medical Center (Sanford Health)	Hillsboro	Traill	48
Sanford Mayville Medical Center (formerly Union Hospital) (Sanford Health)	Mayville	Traill	25
Sanford Medical Center Bismarck (Sanford Health)	Bismarck	Burleigh	242, II
Sanford Medical Center Fargo (Sanford Health)	Fargo	Cass	284, I
Sanford South University Medical Center (Sanford Health)	Fargo	Cass	145
Sioux County Custer Health	Fort Yates	Sioux	0
Southwest Healthcare Services Hospital	Bowman	Bowman	63
St. Aloisius Medical Center	Harvey	Wells	110
St. Andrew's Health Center	Bottineau	Bottineau	25
St. Joseph's Hospital (former CHI hospital building, sold)	Dickinson	Stark	(NA)
St. Luke's Hospital	Crosby	Divide	55
Tioga Medical Center	Tioga	Williams	55
Towner County Medical Center	Cando	Towner	50
Trinity Hospital (Trinity Health (Minot, North Dakota))	Minot	Ward	251, II
Trinity Hospital-St. Joseph's (Trinity Health (Minot, North Dakota))	Minot	Ward	165
Unimed Medical Center (became part of Trinity Health in 2001)	Minot	Ward	(see Trinity Health Hospital)
Unity Medical Center	Grafton	Walsh	14
Veteran's Administration Regional Medical Center	Fargo	Cass	37
Vibra Hospital of Central Dakotas	Mandan	Morton	41
Vibra Hospital of Fargo	Fargo	Cass	31
West River Health Services	Hettinger	Adams	25
Wishek Community Hospital (South Central Health)	Wishek	McIntosh	24

== See also ==
- North Dakota#Health care
