= Bohrer =

Bohrer is a German occupational surname literally meaning "one who bores/drills." However, the word “Bohrer” (short for "Bohrmaschine") is in German used also colloquially to refer to a drill.

Notable people with the surname include:

- Brian Bohrer (born 1960), American pastor and author
- Corinne Bohrer (born 1958), American movie and television actress
- Doris Bohrer (1923–2016), American intelligence operative
- Florence Fifer Bohrer (1877–1960), American politician
- Florin Berenguer Bohrer (born 1989), French footballer
- Karl Heinz Bohrer (1932–2021), German literary scholar and essayist
- Thomas Bohrer (born 1963), American rower
