= Burkle addressing system =

The Burkle addressing system is a system of assigning road names and addresses over a large, rural geographical area. It is used in the state of North Dakota for rural addresses to be used for the 911 system as well as mail delivery to rural properties. Because of its use in the 911 system, it is enshrined in North Dakota state law and is used across the state.

== History ==
The system was created by the Stark County, North Dakota, emergency coordinator Kornard Burkle in 1988 as a way of assigning addresses to houses for use in the then soon to be implemented enhanced 911 services in Stark County. A key problem for the system was that since most of the county was rural farmland a significant number of farms in the county either lacked a proper address, or the address they had was not in any uniform system. After a meeting on the proposed E911 implementation, Burkle went home and devised what would become the Burkle addressing system to address the challenges faced by the county. Because other counties implementing the E911 system in North Dakota faced the same problem and to add a measure of consistency across the state, it was decided that the Burkle system would be used statewide for addressing rural properties. At the time it was proposed, no state had adopted a statewide addressing system but since then other states have adopted similar systems.

In North Dakota, the 'center point' of reference for all but three counties is a point several miles south of the hamlet of Pickardville (between Mercer and McClusky). The exceptions are Burleigh, Grand Forks, and Ward counties; each setting their 'center point' based on the addressing system in the county seat (Bismarck, Grand Forks, and Minot respectively).

== Design of the system ==
=== Road names ===
The basic idea of the system was inspired by the existing address system used in many towns where streets and avenues are numbered outwards from a starting "main street" near the center of town. To number rural section line roads in the state the rough geographical centerlines of the state were designated as "Main Street" (running east–west) and "Main Avenue" (running north–south). Roads are assigned an increasing number moving out from these centerlines with the number of the road determined by the number of miles it is from the corresponding centerline. For roads on half section lines an M is added to the road name and for quarter section lines an F is added.

=== Addresses ===
In addition to providing names for the many rural roads, the system also provides a method of assigning addresses to properties along these roads. As with most city house numbering systems, the first digits of the house number are simply taken from the lower numbered crossing street or avenue on the "block" that the property resides on. For the final two digits of the house number the one mile section lines are divided into segments of 1/50 mile (110 ft; 32 m) and this is used to assign the final two digits; choosing an odd number if the property is on the north or west side of the road or an even number for properties on the south or east side. In areas of subdivisions where the system is employed but a higher address accuracy is required, the increments are reduced to 1/100 mile (53 ft; 16 m).
