= CHI St. Alexius Health Bismarck =

- CommonSpirit Health (Catholic Health Initiatives)
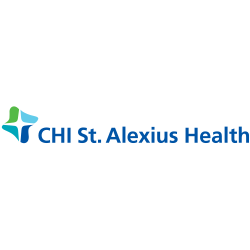

Geography
- Location: Bismarck, North Dakota, United States
- Coordinates: 46°48′28″N 100°46′40″W

Organization
- Type: Non-profit
- Religious affiliation: Catholic church

Services
- Emergency department: Level II trauma center

Helipads
- Helipad: Bismarck

History
- Opened: 1885

Links
- Website: www.chistalexiushealth.org
- Lists: Hospitals in North Dakota

Catholic Health Initiatives (CHI) St. Alexius Health Bismarck is a regional, acute care medical center offering inpatient and outpatient medical services, including primary and specialty physician clinics, home health and hospice services, medical equipment services, and a fitness and human performance center. It is a level II trauma center. With a tertiary hospital in Bismarck, the system also consists of critical access hospitals (CAHs) in Carrington, Dickinson, Devils Lake, Garrison, Turtle Lake, and Williston, and numerous clinics and outpatient services. CHI St. Alexius Health manages four CAHs in North Dakota - in Elgin, Linton, and Wishek, as well as Mobridge Regional Medical Center in Mobridge, South Dakota.

== History ==
Since its founding in 1885, CHI St. Alexius Health Bismarck has served the residents of central and western North Dakota, northern South Dakota, and eastern Montana. CHI St. Alexius Health is a Roman Catholic organization whose parent organization is Catholic Health Initiatives. In 2018 Dignity Health and Catholic Health Initiatives (CHI) received approval from the Catholic Church through the Vatican to merge. When completed the new hospital network, called CommonSpirit Health, will be the largest non-profit hospital system in the United States based on revenue.

== Ownership ==
CHI St. Alexius Health is part of CommonSpirit Health. Sponsors for CHI St. Alexius Health are the Sisters of St. Benedict of the Annunciation Monastery, Bismarck, ND and as an organization it follows the Ethical and Religious Directives for Catholic Health Care Services as promulgated by the United States Conference of Catholic Bishops.

=== CHI medical facilities ===
The hospitals, clinics and medical plazas that are part of CHI include the following facilities in North Dakota:

Name	City	State
CHI St. Alexius Health Devils Lake Hospital	Devils Lake	North Dakota
CHI St. Alexius Health Williston Medical Center	Williston	North Dakota
CHI St. Alexius Health Dickinson Medical Center (formerly St. Joseph's Hospital and Medical Center)	Dickinson	North Dakota
CHI St. Alexius Health Carrington Medical Center	Carrington	North Dakota
CHI St. Alexius Health Turtle Lake Hospital	Turtle Lake	North Dakota
CHI St. Alexius Health Garrison Hospital	Garrison	North Dakota
CHI St. Alexius Health Bismarck Medical Center	Bismarck	North Dakota
CHI St. Alexius Health Beach Family Clinic	Beach	North Dakota
CHI St. Alexius Health Mandan Medical Plaza	Mandan	North Dakota
CHI St. Alexius Health Minot Medical Plaza	Minot	North Dakota
CHI St. Alexius Health New Rockford Family Clinic	New Rockford	North Dakota
CHI St. Alexius Health Washburn Family Clinic	Washburn	North Dakota
