= 1887 Dakota Territory division referendum =

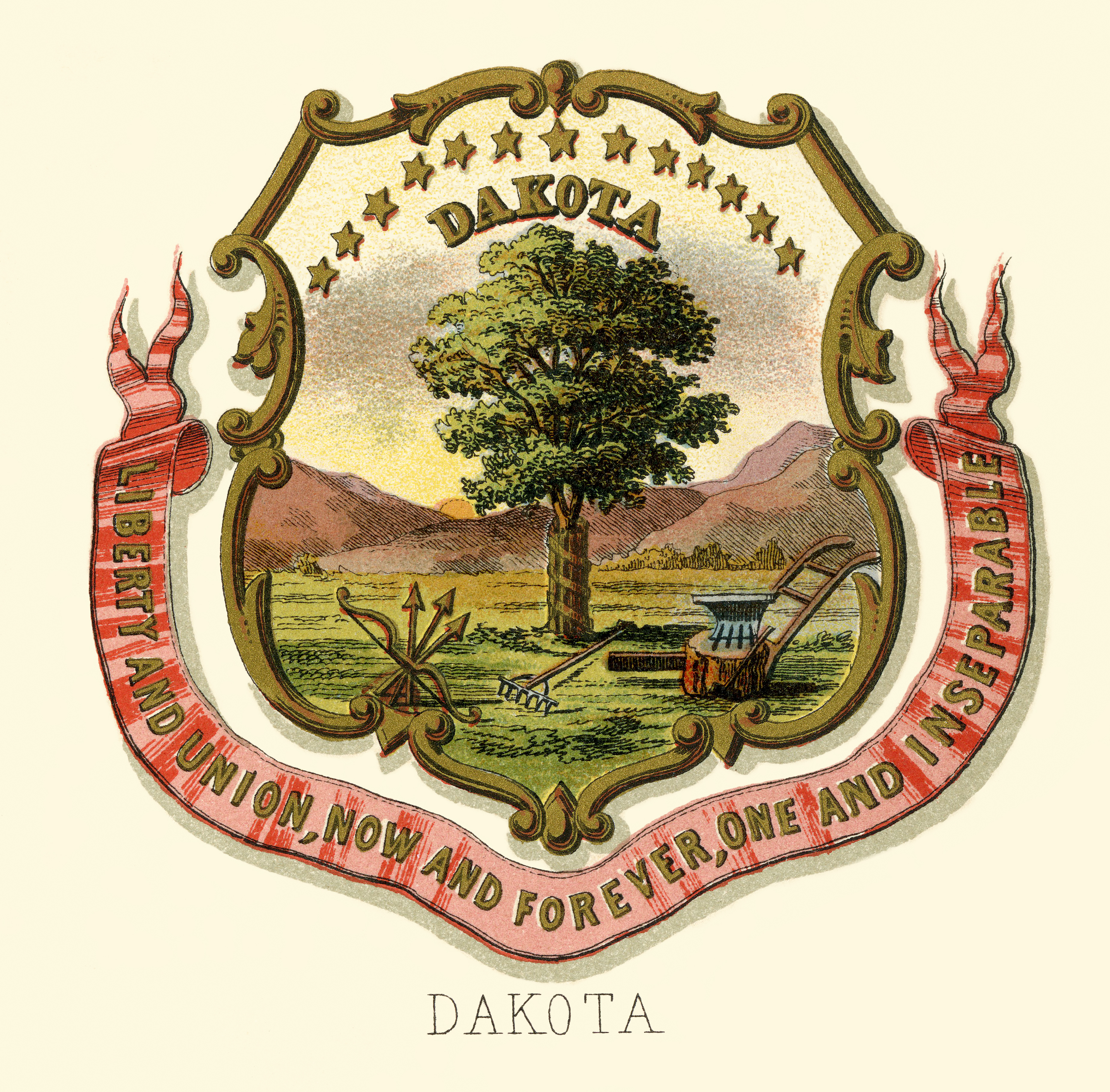
8 November 1887

Results
Choice	Votes	%
For division	37,784	53.44%
Against division	32,913	46.56%

The 1887 Dakota Territory division referendum was an advisory referendum held on 8 November 1887 which asked voters if they wished to split the Dakota Territory into two states, North and South.

== Background ==
The current U.S. states of North Dakota and South Dakota were originally part of the Dakota Territory prior to receiving statehood. There are two conflicting narratives as to why the Dakota Territory was divided and given statehood. One narrative suggests that it was due to regionalist tensions, whilst the other suggests that it was a political play by Gilded Age Republicans.

The idea of a separate North and South due to regionalist tensions is best exemplified when the territorial governor Nehemiah G. Ordway infamously moved the territorial capital from Yankton (today in South Dakota) to Bismarck (today in North Dakota) in 1883 in a 'capital grab' to the more sparsely populated north, which fueled more resentment in the south.

== Ballot ==
On 11 March 1887, the Legislative Assembly of the Territory of Dakota approved the holding of a referendum through an Act with the Long title of an Act to Submit to the Legal Voters of the Territory of Dakota the Question of the Division of the Territory. The Act set the date of the 8 November 1887 for the holding of the referendum and was to be conducted as a general election. The act proposed a division along the 7th standard parallel, with the ballot giving voters the choices of "For division" or "Against division".

== Results ==
The results came were announced by the Governor of the Dakota Territory, Louis K. Church on 10 January 1888 with 37,784 favouring division and 32,913 being opposed.
