= Altru Health System =

American healthcare company

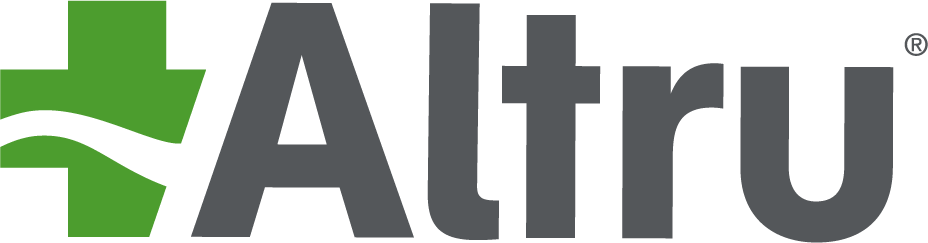
- Type: Private
- Industry: Health care
- Headquarters: Grand Forks, North Dakota, US
- Area served: North Dakota
- Products: Hospitals; Cinics; Retirement communities
- Website: www.altru.org

Altru Health System is an American healthcare organization headquartered in Grand Forks, North Dakota, United States. Altru is a nonprofit serving over 230,000 residents in northeast North Dakota and northwestern Minnesota. It employs more than 3,200 health professionals and support staff. As a regional-owned health system, Altru has provided healthcare for over 130 years.

Altru Health System's facilities system includes an acute care hospital, a specialty hospital, a Level II trauma center, and twenty practice locations across eastern North Dakota and northwest Minnesota.

== Facilities ==
Altru Health System Hospital
- Altru Health System

Geography
- Location: 1200 S. Columbia Road, Grand Forks, North Dakota, United States
- Coordinates: 47.91102602555691°N 97.06917973795684°W

Organization
- Type: General
- Affiliated university: Mayo Clinic Care Network

Services
- Emergency department: Level II trauma center

History
- Former names: St. Luke's Hospital (1892), Grand Forks Clinic (1940), St. Michael's Hospital (1907), The United Hospital (1971), Altru Health Systems (1997)
- Opened: 1892

Links
- Website: www.altru.org/our-locations
- Lists: Hospitals in North Dakota

Altru Health Systems facilities in Grand Forks include the following:

- Altru Clinic, 1300 S. Columbia Road
- Altru Behavioral Health, 860 S. Columbia Road
- Altru Cancer Center, 960 S. Columbia Road
- Altru Family Medicine Center, 1380 S. Columbia Road
- Altru Family Medicine Residency, 725 Hamline Street
- Altru Health Foundation, 2501 DeMers Avenue
- Altru Hospital, 1200 S. Columbia Road
- Altru Patient Services, 3065 Demers Avenue
- Altru Professional Center, 4440 S. Washington Street
- Altru Performance Center, 1375 S. Columbia Road
- Altru Specialty Center, 4500 S. Washington Street
- Altru Sleep Center, 4350 S. Washington Street
- Dak Minn Blood Bank, 3375 DeMers Avenue
- Sanny and Jerry Ryan Center for Prevention and Genetics, 4401 S. 11th Street
- Sunshine Hospitality Home, 933 Duke Dr.
- Truyu Aesthetic Center, 3165 DeMers Avenue

Regional Facilities include:

- Altru Clinic Crookston, 400 S. Minnesota Street Crookston, MN
- Altru Clinic Devils Lake, 1001 7th Street NE Devils Lake, ND
- Altru Hospital Devils Lake, 1031 7th Street NE Devils Lake, ND
- Altru Clinic East Grand Forks, 607 DeMers Avenue East Grand Forks, MN
- Altru Clinic Erskine, 23076 347th Street SE Erskine, MN
- Altru Clinic Thief River Falls, 1845 Hwy. 59 South, Ste. 800 Thief River Falls, MN

== History ==
The roots of Altru Health System date from 1892 with the construction of St. Luke’s Hospital in downtown Grand Forks (renamed Deaconess Hospital in 1899). In 1997, Altru Health System was formed and expanded into one of the largest health systems in the region.
