= Brian Bohrer =

American pastor

Brian Lester Bohrer
- Pastor Brian Bohrer
- Born: August 15, 1960 (age 65); Grand Forks, North Dakota, U.S.
- Education: MBI, RHEMA Bible College, ICBC
- Occupation: Pastor
- Known for: Author of "Word Therapy"
- Spouse: Marion Kimberly Bohrer
- Children: Brian Andrew Bohrer, Jessica Ruth Bohrer-Siem, Johnathon Lowell Bohrer
- Parent(s): Bill Bohrer (deceased - June 1990) and Pat Adams Bohrer-Genn (deceased - June 2011)

Brian Lester Bohrer (born August 15, 1960) is a pastor and author.

== History ==
Brian L. Bohrer was born in Grand Forks, North Dakota, on a military base. His father was in the United States Air Force and was from Paw Paw, West Virginia. His mother was from Magnolia, Arkansas.

He was led to the Lord in 1967 at a community park in Bossier City, Louisiana by a group called “Child Evangelism Fellowship” while his family was stationed at Barksdale Air Force Base, in Bossier City, LA, a neighboring city to Shreveport, Louisiana.

As a child, he was sick and delusional at night time. He would wander through his house in trance like state acting like a monkey in a panicked state of mind. During this time, at his elementary school he was attending special learning classes. His family and took him to a Kathryn Kuhlman meeting at Tulsa Civic Center in Tulsa, Oklahoma. In his book, Winning On the Inside, claims he was healed at that meeting.

Although he had never meet Mrs. Kuhlman he often cited that she, Oral Roberts, and Kenneth E. Hagin were the greatest influences upon his life.

Brian Bohrer currently resides in Washington, Missouri and pastors Living Bread Church which has recently celebrated 30 years in the ministry. He has organized outreaches in the local community that have reached the attention of The Washington Missourian.

== Ministry and Theology ==
Brian Bohrer attended Midwest Bible Institute in Houston, TX and is a graduate of RHEMA Bible Training Center of Broken Arrow, OK. which was founded by Kenneth E. Hagin. He holds a Bachelor of Arts in Christian Ministry from ICIB College, Alexandria, LA.

He has been a pastor and a traveling minister for more than 31 years, preaching his first sermon in November 1978 at Midwest Bible Institute.

His teaching is similar in many respects to the Word of Faith doctrine, with a particular emphasis on healing and victorious living.

Those of the Word of Faith movement that he associates with are, Jesse Duplantis, Mark Hankins, Kenneth Copeland, Crelfo Dollar, Joseph Prince, Joel Osteen, and the Trinity Broadcasting Network.

== Achievements ==
- He had a radio broadcast on KXEN 1010 AM Radio
- Brian Bohrer is an affiliate minister on cfaith.com, an ISP and online media content provider. His articles and sermons have been featured in Cfaith's online magazine 12 times. (requires subscription to view actual content)
- Speaker at Kenneth Hagin Jr.'s "A Call to Arms Men's Conference" in November 2006 and quoted in the February, 2007 edition of the Word of Faith Magazine (page 17).
- Guest minister on Trinity Broadcasting Network alongside Jesse Duplantis who is a close and longtime friend.
- Brian has written articles that have been featured in such magazines as: New Man eMagazine on the subject of “Healing the Cheating Heart” – a Strang Communications in Vol. 12 Number 24; June 12, 2008 an outreach of Charisma (magazine). Connections Magazine on the subject of, “Pornography,” – a ministry of Kenneth Hagin Ministries; Vol. spring/summer 2009.
- Guest speaker in 2011 at the Governor's Mansion of Arkansas, alongside Governor Mike Beebe on behalf of the Arkansas Ovarian Cancer Coalition.

== Articles by Bohrer ==
- The Virgin Birth, The Washington Missourian (2002)

== Books by Bohrer ==
- Eye-Wired Men: What Every Man Needs To Know About Himself (2008), ISBN 1-893019-65-9
- Forgiveness: 31 Days to Freedom (2000), ISBN 1-893019-52-7
- Think One Can: Taking Control of Your Life By Taking Control of Your Attitude (2008), ISBN 1-893019-66-7
- Winning On the Inside: Living Beyond Yesterday (1999, 2nd print 2009), ISBN 1-893019-50-0
- Wisdom & Money Workshop – Debt Free & Loving It! (2005), ISBN 1-893019-63-2
- Word Therapy : The creative power of your words, (2004), ISBN 1-893019-51-9
- Discover Your Identity: Who You Are and What You Have In Christ, (2002), ISBN 1-893019-55-1
