= Doris Bohrer =

American intelligence operative

Doris Arlene Bohrer
- Born: February 5, 1923
- Died: August 8, 2016 (aged 93)
- Occupation: Intelligence operative

Doris Arlene Bohrer (5 February 1923 – 8 August 2016) was an American intelligence operative who started her career during World War II with the Office of Strategic Services and was later deputy head of counterintelligence for the Central Intelligence Agency.
