= Washington Missourian =

Newspaper in Washington, Missouri

- Type: Twice-weekly newspaper
- Owner: Missourian Publishing Company
- Publisher: Bill Miller Jr.
- Editor: Ethan Colbert
- Founded: 1860; 166 years ago
- Language: English
- Headquarters: 6321 Bluff Road Washington, MO 63090
- City: Washington, Missouri
- Country: United States
- Circulation: 10,050
- Website: emissourian.com

The Washington Missourian is the Franklin County newspaper based in Washington, Missouri. The paper is owned by Hoffman Media Group. In addition to news stories in Washington, the paper covers the nearby cities of Union, St. Clair, and Pacific, as well as local stories from the surrounding areas.

== History ==
The Franklin County-Gazette was founded on January 5, 1860. In April 1861, the name was changed to the Franklin County News. In April 1867, it became the Franklin County Observer. That name lasted until August 1926 when it was changed to the Washington Missourian.

In 1937, James L. Miller Sr. purchased the paper from J. N. McClure. He was later succeeded by his son William L. Miller Sr., who worked at The Missourian for over 67 years until his retirement. He ran the newspaper until June 10, 2020, when he stepped down after facing backlash for publishing a racially insensitive political cartoon by Tom Stiglich. His daughters, Susan Miller Warden and Jeanne Miller Wood had resigned as owners of the company in protest earlier that day.

In June 2025, the Miller family sold the paper to the Hoffmann Family of Companies.
