= Trinity Health (Minot, North Dakota) =

American health system

- Company type: Private
- Industry: Health care
- Founded: 1929; 97 years ago
- Headquarters: Minot, North Dakota
- Area served: North Dakota, Eastern Montana
- Key people: John M. Kutch (president/CEO)
- Services: Hospital management, outpatient centers, pharmacies, medical laboratories, ambulance services, air ambulances
- Revenue: $124 million (2018)
- Website: www.trinityhealth.org

Trinity Health is an American healthcare provider headquartered in Minot, North Dakota. Trinity is a non-profit organization with more than 150 physicians and is the largest employer in Minot.

Trinity's facilities include three acute care hospitals (Trinity Health Hospital and Trinity Hospital-St. Joseph's in Minot and Trinity Kenmare Community Hospital in Kenmare), several clinics, and a 292-bed long-term care and retirement facility. Trinity Health Hospital has been designated as a Level II trauma center.

== History ==
During the early 1920s, Lutheran pastors from across the Northwest Territory gathered in Minot, ND, to sketch out plans for a hospital.

In 1922, the Trinity Hospital Association was formed and within weeks ground was broken for a 30-bed hospital unit, the first of four such units to be constructed over the course of a decade.

During the 1970s, Trinity Hospital merged with the Lutheran Home to form Trinity Medical Center. In the early 1990s, Trinity formed its own physician services department – Trinity Medical Group.

On January 1, 1999, Trinity Medical Center changed its name to Trinity Health.

In 1999, the Trinity CancerCare Center was built adjacent to Health Center-Town & Country.

On May 3, 2001, Trinity Health merged with UniMed Medical Center, Medical Arts Clinic and Kenmare Community Hospital under the banner of Trinity Health.

== Facilities ==
Trinity Health facilities include three hospitals, medical laboratories, medical equipment, eyecare, walk-in clinics, long-term care, pharmacies, physician services/care providers, community clinics, and wellness centers.

== Expansion ==
In January 2009, it opened its CancerCare Cottage, a building which provides accommodations for cancer patients and their caregivers while they are receiving treatment at Trinity Health's CancerCare Center.

In April 2008, it was reportedly considering building a medical park. In January 2009, it bought 50 acres (200,000 m^{2}) of land southwest Minot for a new hospital and medical park. On October 31, 2016, Trinity officially sought rezoning of the land for the expansion from agricultural to general commercial usage. In November 2016, it was reported that Trinity planned to offer $430 million in bonds to fund their expansion and to pay off previously issued bonds. In January 2017, Trinity chose TEG Architects of Jeffersonville, Indiana to design and coordinate the construction of their new expansion.

== Legal Settlements ==
=== Cerner ===
In March 2014, Cerner settled a legal dispute with Trinity Health over allegations of defective financial software with a settlement of $106 million.

=== Hepatitis C ===
In August 2013, patients receiving contracted blood work and podiatry services from Trinity contracted Hepatitis C. Fifty-two individuals were infected, including 48 residents or former residents of ManorCare Health Services.

According to CDC data, the North Dakota outbreak accounted for one-fourth of all hepatitis cases nationally since 2008 and has been called the second-largest outbreak of Hepatitis C.

In April 2014, the victims of the Hepatitis C outbreak sued HCR Manor Care.

In March 2015, HCR Manor Care and 21 victims sued Trinity after it became clear that Trinity was the more likely source of the outbreak. HCR Manor Care and the 21 victims alleged that an employee of Trinity's outpatient laboratory service reused needles and didn't follow infection control practices.

In September 2016, Trinity reached a confidential, out-of-court settlement with 21 of the victims.

== Controversy ==
=== Dr Marc Eichler ===
In October 2015, Dr Marc Eichler, a neurosurgeon employed by Trinity Health, was arrested for allegedly exchanging pictures of his genitals via Snapchat with two girls under 15, and he is alleged to have fondled one of them when she was babysitting. On October 29, 2015, Eichler was charged with gross sexual imposition, a Class AA felony, and two counts of luring minors by computer, both Class B felonies. On October 7, 2016, Eichler's trial was rescheduled. In February 2017, Eichler changed his plea and agreed to plead guilty to one count of production of child pornography.
