= First National Bank (Grand Forks, North Dakota) =

- U.S. National Register of Historic Places
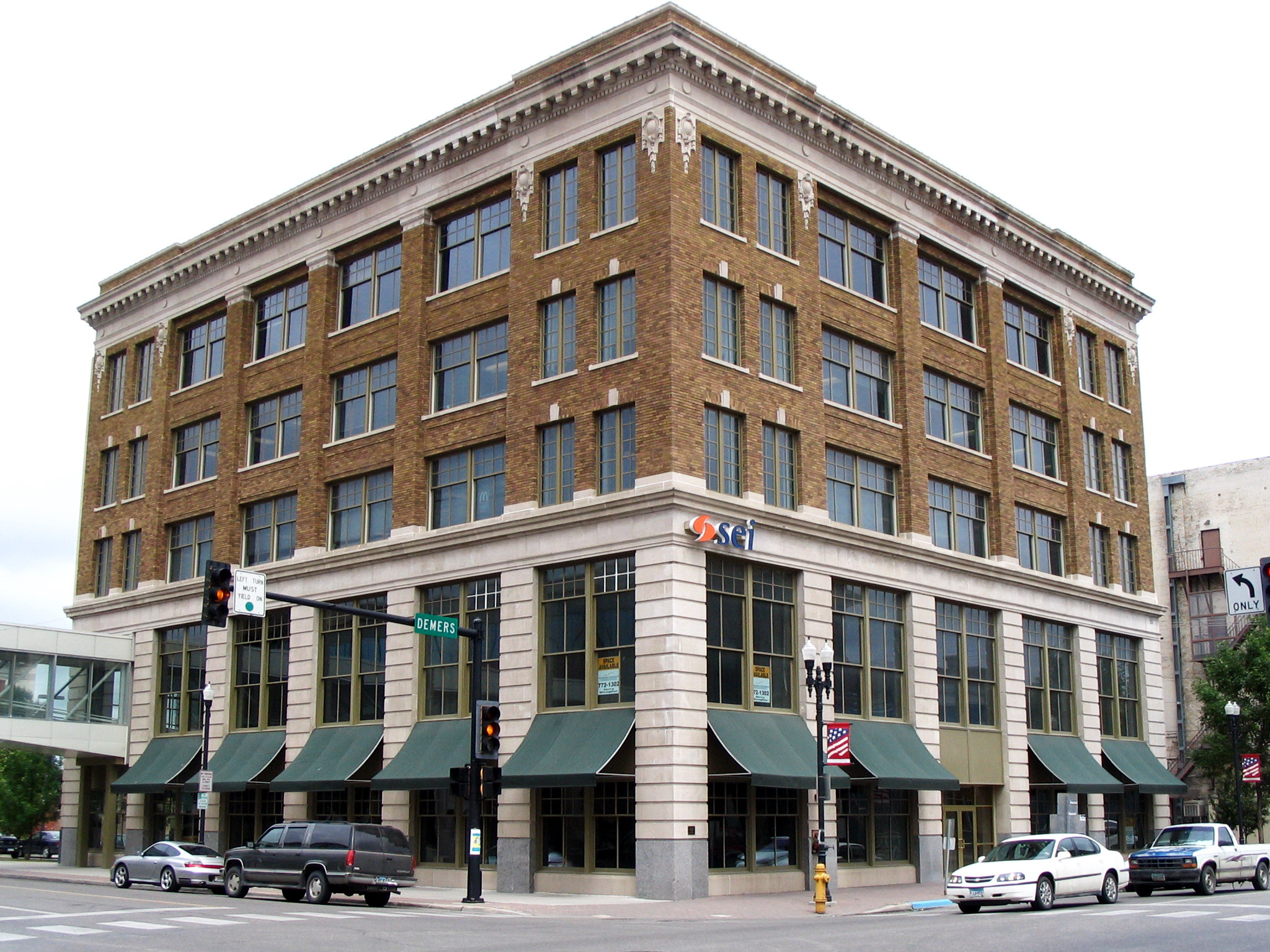
- Photographed in 2006

- Location within North Dakota Location within the United States
- Location: 322 DeMers Ave., Grand Forks, North Dakota
- Coordinates: 47°55′29″N 97°1′52″W
- Area: less than 1 acre (0.40 ha)
- Built: 1914 and 1915
- Architectural style: Early Commercial, Classical Revival, Other, and Vernacular
- MPS: Downtown Grand Forks MRA
- NRHP reference No.: 82001323
- Added to NRHP: October 26, 1982

The First National Bank is a five-story building in Grand Forks, North Dakota, that was built in 1914–15 and listed on the National Register of Historic Places in 1982. It was built for the Scandinavian-American Bank, but has been identified as the First National Bank building since 1929.

== History ==
When it was founded, the Scandinavian-American Bank had its offices in the Metropolitan Opera House in Grand Forks. The new bank building was constructed in 1914–15 and occupied in 1915. When the bank later obtained a charter as a national bank, it took the name Northwestern National Bank. In 1929, it merged with the First National Bank, and the combined bank located in this building. First National Bank failed in 1933, during the Great Depression, but was replaced by a new First National Bank entity that later became Alerus Financial in 2000.

The building is located on a corner lot, approximately 90 by 100 ft (27 by 30 m) in size, at the intersection of DeMers Avenue and North Fourth Street. It is considered an "outstanding example" of the use of Classical Revival architecture in the context of a large commercial building. The two sides that face the street have two-part facades in which the lower two stories are fronted by rusticated ashlar piers built on top of polished granite blocks and the three upper stories are faced with red brick. The top of the building is decorated with a stone cornice.

The property was included in a 1981 study of the historical resources of downtown Grand Forks. It was damaged by flooding and fire in the 1997 Red River flood; it is the only building on the block that was not demolished as a result of flooding and fire.

== Related reading ==
- Ashley Shelby (2008) Red River Rising: The Anatomy of a Flood and the Survival of an American City (Minnesota Historical Society) ISBN 9780873516945
