= Alerus =

"Alerus" may refer to:

- Alerus Center, a large indoor arena and convention center in Grand Forks, North Dakota
- Alerus Financial, a chain of financial institutions headquartered in Grand Forks, North Dakota
