= Green Business Certification Inc. =

American environmental organization

- Abbreviation: GBCI
- Formation: 2008; 18 years ago
- Type: NGO
- Headquarters: Washington, D.C., U.S.
- Region served: International
- Members: 62,189+
- Website: www.gbci.org

The Green Business Certification, Inc. (GBCI) is an American organization that provides third-party credentialing and verification for several rating systems relating to the built environment. It was established as the Green Building Certification Institute in January 2008 with the support of the U.S. Green Building Council to provide independent oversight of the Leadership in Energy and Environmental Design (LEED) project certification and professional credentialing processes. The organization's current name was adopted on 16 April 2015 after the organization began to provide third-party certification for the International WELL Building Institute's evidence-based building standard WELL Building Standard, the Perfect Power Institute's PEER standard, and the Global Real Estate Sustainability Benchmark.

== LEED Professional Credentials ==
The suite of LEED professional credentials was designed to denote leadership in green building and to distinguish building professionals with the knowledge and skills to successfully steward the LEED certification process. Credentialing exams and designations administered by GBCI include the LEED Green Associate, LEED AP with specialty, and LEED Fellow, as well as the LEED for Homes Green Rater and Green Classroom Professional certificates. The LEED professional credential exams are ANSI 17024 accredited.

== LEED Project Certification ==
GBCI administers the LEED certification program, performing third-party technical reviews and verification of LEED-registered projects to determine if they have met the standards set forth by the LEED rating system. As of April 2013, the total footprint of LEED-certified projects is nearly 3 billion square feet, and nearly eight billion additional square feet are registered with GBCI for LEED certification.

== See also ==
- GreenRight Certified
- LEED
- U.S. Green Building Council
- LEED Accredited Professional Exam
- sustainable architecture
- Energy conservation
- Environmental design
- Renewable energy
- Zero energy building
- Permaculture
- Ecological footprint
- United States energy law
- United States energy policy
