= City Center Mall =

Shopping mall in Grand Forks, North Dakota, US (1978–1997)

Coordinates: 47°55′28″N 97°01′48″W

City Center Mall was a shopping mall located in downtown Grand Forks, North Dakota that was constructed by closing off a block of Third Street. Construction was done in 1978 by building a roof over the former street and walls, closing off the block. Fountains were built where the street was located.

== History ==
Despite the mall's attempt to attract shoppers to the downtown area, it did not improve business. This trend continued until the mall was destroyed in the flood of 1997. The mall was not rebuilt, and Third Street was reopened to traffic.
