= JLG Architects =

Architecture firm

- Industry: Architecture
- Founded: 1989
- Key people: Gary Johnson, Lonnie Laffen, James Galloway
- Website: www.jlgarchitects.com

JLG Architects is an architecture firm that specializes in urban design, master planning and architectural design for sports/recreation facilities, universities, K-12 schools, aviation facilities, medical centers, and mixed-use/multi-family housing. JLG has offices in Minneapolis, St. Cloud, and Alexandria, Minnesota, and Grand Forks, Bismarck, Minot, Williston, and Fargo, North Dakota, Rapid City and Sioux Falls, South Dakota, and Boston, Massachusetts.

== History ==
JLG Architects was founded in 1989 by Gary Johnson, FAIA and Lonnie Laffen, AIA, LEED AP under the name Johnson & Laffen Architects, Ltd. In 1994, the firm received the national AIA Intern Development Program Outstanding Firm Award. In 2000, James Galloway, AIA, LEED AP joined the firm, renaming it Johnson Laffen Galloway Architects, Ltd. The firm's Minneapolis office was opened in 2002, led by Michelle Mongeon Allen, AIA, LEED AP. The firm name was changed to JLG Architects the same year. In 2004, Dan Miller, AIA, LEED AP opened the Alexandria office, and in 2005, Joel Davy, AIA, LEED AP opened an office in Fargo. The Bismarck office opened in 2010 and the Williston office opened in December 2012. In 2012, Minot-based Davison Larson Associates merged with JLG. JLG has won more North Dakota AIA awards than any other firm in North Dakota. JLG is also part of the 1% pro bono design program of public architecture and donates a considerable amount of design services to non-profit organizations.

== Awards and rankings ==
From 2020 to 2021, JLG Architects has been Great Place to Work Certified.

From 2019 to 2021, LUXlife Winter Sports Awards featured JLG Architects as the recipient of the Best Ice Hockey Arena Architects, Upper Midwest USA.

In 2021, Inc. Magazine listed JLG Architects in the Top 5000 Fastest-Growing Privately Held Companies in the US. Additionally, JLG made the list in 2014, 2015, 2016, and 2020.

From 2014 to 2021, JLG Architects has been listed in Prairie Business Magazine 50 Best Places to Work.

From 2014 to 2016 and 2018 to 2021, JLG Architects has been among the Top 300 Architecture Firms in the US, according to Architectural Record.

From 2015 to 2020, ENR listed JLG Architects in the Top 500 Design Firms four of the years. ENR also ranked JLG among the Midwest Top Design Firms in 2018.

In 2020, GC Magazine listed JLG Architects as one of the 40 Best Hospital Architects in the United States.

In 2019, AIA North Central States Region awarded JLG Architects with the Emerging Professional Friendly Firm Award.

In 2019, JLG Architects was chosen as ENR Mountain States Design Firm of the Year.

From 2015 to 2019, JLG Architects was ranked on Building Design+Construction's Top 150 Architecture Giants list. JLG has been ranked on many of Building Design+Construction's Top Sector Giants lists as well, including local and state government, cultural facilities, aviation, veterans administration, K-12, multi-family housing, hotels, offices, retail, industrial, religious, sport facilities, university architecture, and healthcare.

In 2018, MSM Money/BestLife selected JLG Architects as one of the 50 Most Admired Companies in the United States.

In 2016, JLG Architects was listed by Inc. Magazine as one of the 50 Best Places to Work in America.

In 2015, JLG Architects was named a Circle of Excellence Firm by PSMJ Resources.

Between 2013 and 2021, JLG Architects was named one of the top 25 architecture firms by MSP Business Journal seven of the years.

In January 2012, JLG was featured in the book "50 US Architects: Residential and Planning."

In November 2010, firm partner Lonnie Laffen was elected to the North Dakota Senate for District 43 in Grand Forks, ND.

In October 2010, JLG Architects was named to the ZweigWhite Hot 100 List. JLG also earned a spot on the list from 2013 to 2016.

In 2006 JLG was named as one of the 2006 "Top 20 Architecture/Interior Design/Landscape Architecture firms to work for in America." ZweigWhite, a management consulting & research company, ranked JLG Architecture 13th "based on their commitment to providing a positive work environment and challenging and interesting design opportunities for their employees."

== Sustainable Design ==
In the May 2007 issue of Environmental Design + Construction magazine, JLG "officially kicked off an officewide sustainable live, work, and play program with a series of eco-friendly events in honor of Earth Week." Many JLG projects have achieved LEED certification. Among those are; the Gorecki Alumni Center at the University of North Dakota which achieved LEED platinum certification, Black Gold Headquarters which achieved LEED gold certification, and US Bank Stadium which achieved LEED gold certification. The Gorecki Alumni Center continues to be the only LEED Platinum certified commercial building in North Dakota through 2021.

In 2020, JLG Architects signed the American Institute of Architects' Carbon Neutral Commitment, with the goal of reducing energy use and avoiding the use of fossil fuels. By 2021, JLG has purchased carbon offset credits from Prairie Winds Emissions Reduction in North Dakota and Crow Lake Emissions Reduction Project in South Dakota to offset office and travel-related energy used by the company. JLG Architects was the recipient of the Construction Specifications Institute's 2021 Environmental Stewardship Award for its sustainable innovations and applications.

== Select Projects ==
- North Dakota State University Aldevron Tower; Fargo, ND
- The Argyle; Grand Forks, ND
- The Selkirk Lofts; Grand Forks, ND
- Veterans Memorial Park, Al Palmer Visitors Center; Grand Forks, ND
- Frogtown Recreation Center; St. Paul, MN
- Eau Claire City Hall Renovation; Eau Claire, WI
- U of M Health Clinics and Surgery; Minneapolis, MN
- US Bank Stadium; Minneapolis, MN
- University of Minnesota East Bank Recreation Center; Minneapolis, MN
- South Dakota State University Harding Hall; Brookings, SD
- Watford City High School; Watford City, ND
- Grand Forks Regional Water Treatment Plant; Grand Forks, ND
- Sanford Fargo Medical Center; Fargo, ND
- The Farmhouse Bistro, Bar & Backyard; Spearfish, SD
- Sanford Moorhead Clinic; Moorhead, MN
- St. Cloud State University National Hockey Center Addition & Renovation; St. Cloud, MN
- Grand Forks International Airport Terminal; Grand Forks, ND
- Minnesota Joint Operations Center
- The Alerus Center; Grand Forks, ND
- Canad Inns Destination Center; Grand Forks, ND
- Douglas County Hospital Addition & Renovation; Alexandria, MN
- North Dakota State University Cityscapes Plaza; Fargo, ND
- University of North Dakota University Place Apartments; Grand Forks, ND
- Cedar Rapids Flood Recovery and Vision; Cedar Rapids, IA
- Ojibwa Millennium School; Belcourt, ND
- Historic Waldorf Flats; St. Paul, MN
- Cass Gilbert Double House; St. Paul, MN
- Alexandria Area YMCA; Alexandria, MN
- Devils Lake Airport Terminal and Air Fire Fighting and Rescue Station; Devils Lake, ND Devils Lake Regional Airport
- The North Face; Minneapolis, MN
- Roberts Street Chaplet; Fargo, ND
- Hopper Danley Memorial; Grand Forks, ND
- Metropolitan Opera House Lofts; Grand Forks, ND
- Coe College Area Development Plan; Cedar Rapids, IA
- Horton Hall; Wahpeton, ND
- Alexandria High School; Alexandria, MN
- UND School of Medicine and Health Sciences; Grand Forks, ND
- Boathouse; Grand Forks, ND
- Rhoades Science Center; Valley City, ND
- Grand Forks Elementary; Grand Forks, ND
- UND Gorecki Alumni Center; Grand Forks, ND
- Living Word Lutheran Church; Alexandria, MN
- Ward County Office; Minot, ND
- Black Gold Headquarters; Grand Forks, ND
- Sanford Pentagon; Sioux Falls, SD
- Williston Area Recreation Center; Williston, ND

== Sources ==
88.^ "the Best General Contractors in Virginia."
