= Grand Forks Park District =

Government agency of Grand Forks, North Dakota

Grand Forks Park District logo

The Grand Forks Park District is a government agency of Grand Forks, North Dakota. The Park District was founded in 1905 and levies its own taxes separately from local government. The Park District was founded in 1905.

== Description ==
The parks in the district include:

- Bringewatt Park (South 20th Street & 24th Avenue South) - soccer fields, volleyball, play equipment, restrooms
- Cox Park (1010 24th Avenue South) - hockey rinks, skating rink, softball/baseball fields, play equipment, restrooms
- Jaycee's Park (4798 Technology Circle) - hockey rinks, skating rink, warming house, softball/baseball field, shelters, picnic facilities, play equipment, restrooms
- Kelly Park (32nd Avenue South and Cherry Street) - hockey rinks, skating rink, softball/baseball fields, play equipment, restrooms
- Optimist Park (4600 Cherry Street) - hockey rinks, skating rink, softball/baseball fields, basketball courts, picnic facilities, play equipment, restrooms
- Lake Agassiz Park (Stanford Road and 6th Avenue North) - hockey rinks, skating rink, softball/baseball fields, basketball courts, play equipment, restrooms
- Lincoln Drive Park (Lincoln Drive and Belmont Road) - memorial, floral gardens, hockey rinks, tennis, cross country skiing, sledding hill, horseshoe courts, concession area, picnic facilities, play equipment, restrooms
- Lion's Park (17th Avenue South and South 28th Street) - hockey rinks, skating rink, soccer fields, restrooms
- Prime Steel Park (formerly Johnson Park) (14th Avenue South and South 40th Street) - play equipment
- Richard's West Park (6th Avenue North and North 48th Street) - skating rink, softball/baseball fields, play equipment
- Riverside Park (Park Avenue and Lewis Boulevard) - hockey rinks, skating rink, softball/baseball fields, tennis, volleyball, disc golf, horseshoe courts, large picnic shelter, play equipment, restrooms
- Sertoma Park (West of Altru Health System) - Japanese garden, picnic facilities, play equipment, restrooms
- Ulland Park (South Columbia Road) - softball/baseball fields, concession area, picnic facilities, restrooms
- University Park (University Avenue and North 25th Street) - floral gardens, hockey rink, skating rink, softball/baseball fields, tennis, volleyball, meeting rooms, horseshoe courts, picnic shelters, play equipment, restrooms

Upcoming park include:

- Grand Forks Theme Park - theme park

== Golf courses ==
- King's Walk Golf Course (5301 Columbia Road) - An Arnold Palmer-designed, links style course that was built on an entirely flat piece of land, but now features rolling mounds and two lakes. King's Walk has tall fescue grasses and bent grass greens. Includes putting and chipping greens. A clubhouse is also located at King's Walk.
- Lincoln Golf Course (Belmont Road) - Originally established in 1909, Lincoln Golf Course is one of the oldest golf courses in the state of North Dakota. Due to the Red River Flood of 1997, the formerly 18-hole course has been renovated into a 9-hole course to make way for a new dike system. Today, Lincoln Golf Course sits in the huge Greater Grand Forks Greenway. Lincoln includes putting and chipping greens as well as a clubhouse.

== Mission statement ==
The mission statement of the Grand Forks Park District:

"The mission of the Grand Forks Park District is to promote broad-based opportunities for all ages and abilities, to increase and enhance equal access of recreational benefits and participation in parks and recreation, to increase public awareness as to the healthful benefits of participation in parks and recreation, to promote beautification of the city's natural environment, to promote professionalism in the delivery of parks, recreation, and environmental services, and to increase the understanding of the contributions made by parks, recreation, and forestry to the economic development of our community."
