= Metropolitan Opera House (Grand Forks, North Dakota) =

- U.S. National Register of Historic Places
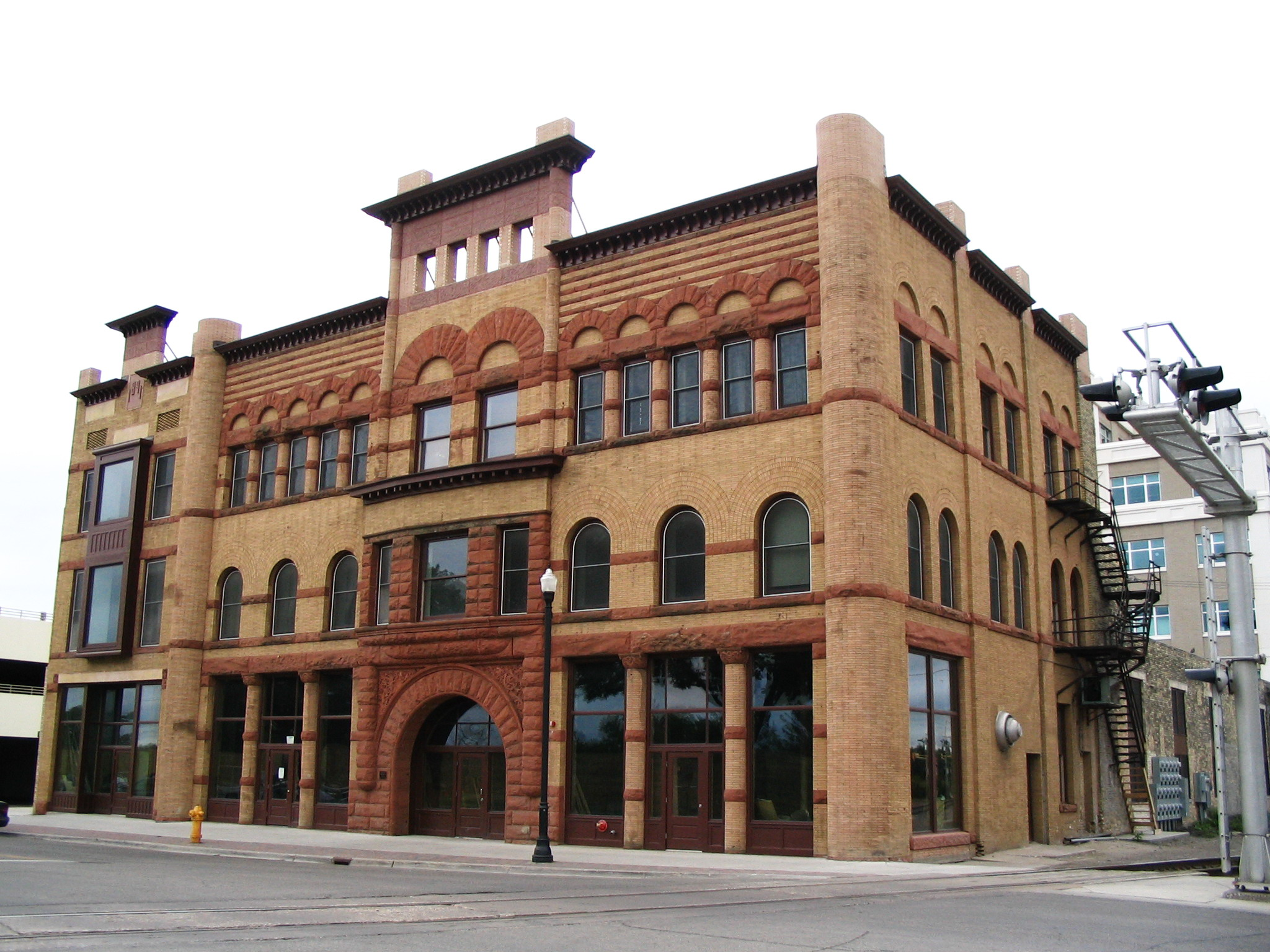

- Location within North Dakota Location within the United States
- Location: 116 S. Third St.
- Nearest city: Grand Forks, North Dakota
- Coordinates: 47°55′26″N 97°01′43″W
- Built: 1890
- Architect: Warren Dunnell
- Architectural style: Romanesque
- NRHP reference No.: 99001048
- Added to NRHP: August 27, 1999

The Metropolitan Opera House (or The Met) is located at 116 South Third Street in the downtown area of Grand Forks, North Dakota, USA. The building, constructed in 1890, faces the Red River of the North and sits between the BNSF Railway tracks and a parking structure. At one time, the Opera House was considered the best opera house between Minneapolis and Seattle. Today, the building has been converted into an apartment building called the Opera House Lofts.

== History ==
The Metropolitan Opera House was built in 1890 by the Grand Forks Opera Company on land donated by James J. Hill of the Great Northern Railway at a cost of $91,000 (equivalent to $3,260,833 in 2025). Though the term "Metropolitan" may have been an overstatement for a community that, at the time, had just 5,000 citizens, those behind construction of the building were looking to the city's future growth. The building required two mortgages to complete and struggled to stay in the black after opening. Nonetheless, it was able to provide citizens 50 years of opera and theatre.

By the 1940s, opera had fallen in popularity due to new forms of entertainment such as film. The Met was no exception and the curtain fell for the last time. Over the next 50 years, the building was home to a variety of businesses. During this period, the 1890s interior was gutted and replaced by bars and bowling alleys.

Badly damaged during the 1997 Red River flood, the building sat empty for several years and came close to meeting the wrecking ball. However, the former opera house was saved by the Historic Preservation Commission. The exterior has since been restored to its 1890s appearance, while the interior has been converted to high-end apartments with space for businesses on the first floor. In 2015, Rhombus Guys Brewing Company opened on the first floor.

== Architecture ==
The building was designed by prominent Minneapolis architect Warren B. Dunnell in the Richardsonian Romanesque style. It went through an extensive renovation/restoration by JLG Architects in 2005 and 2006.
