= Red River State Recreation Area =

Recreation area in Minnesota, United States

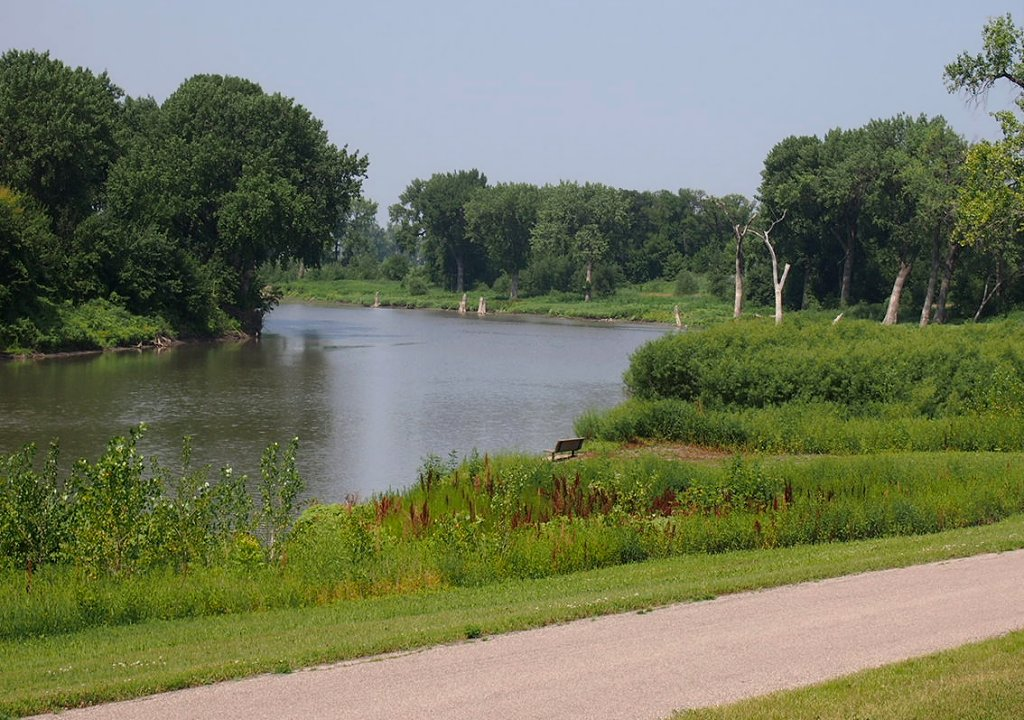
- Red River State Recreation Area

- Location within Minnesota Location within the United States
- Location: Polk, Minnesota, United States
- Coordinates: 47°55′58″N 97°2′8″W
- Area: 1,230 acres (5.0 km^{2})
- Established: 1997
- Governing body: Minnesota Department of Natural Resources

Red River State Recreation Area is part of the Greater Grand Forks Greenway and is located in the city of East Grand Forks, Minnesota on the banks of the Red River of the North and the Red Lake River. It was built as a natural buffer as a direct response to the 1997 Red River flood.

The State Recreation Area is owned and managed by the Minnesota Department of Natural Resources.
