= Grand Cities Art Fest =

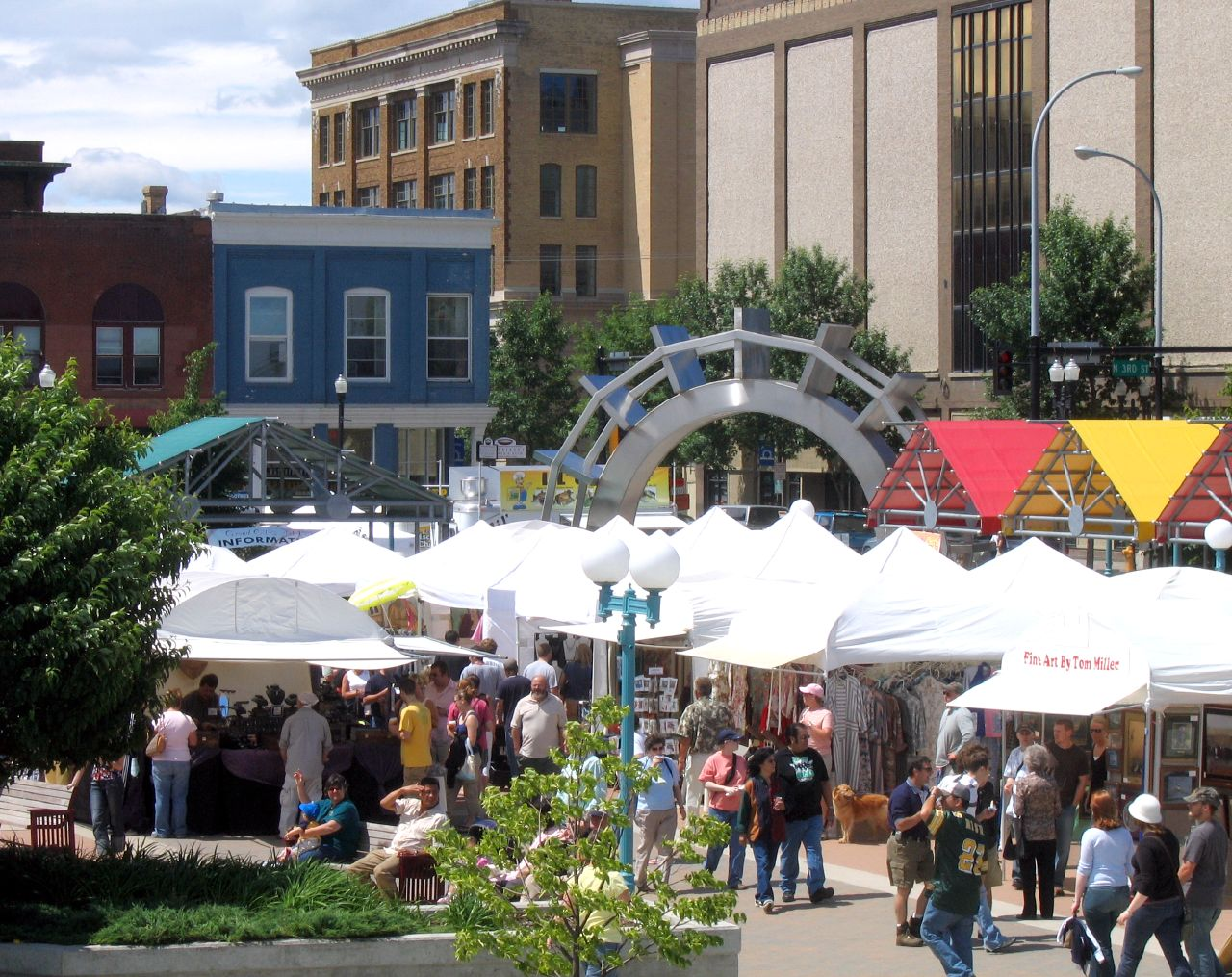
Grand Cities Art Fest 2006 in downtown Grand Forks's Town Square

The Grand Cities Art Fest is an arts festival and street fair, held during the second weekend each June in the twin cities of Grand Forks, North Dakota and East Grand Forks, Minnesota. The event has hosted local artists and artisans, food courts with multiple food vendors, a children's area with arts & crafts and inflatable games, and live entertainment. Art Fest takes place in the neighboring downtown areas of the two cities and on the banks of the Red River of the North in the Greater Grand Forks Greenway.

Art Fest is produced by the Public Arts Commission, with the help of 12 event chairpersons and more than 200 volunteers.

There was no Art Fest in 2020.
