= Alerus Center =

Indoor stadium and convention center in Grand Forks, North Dakota

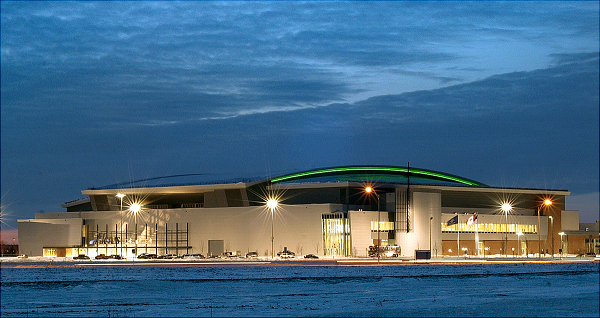
- Alerus Center in 2006
- Interactive map of Alerus Center
- Former names: Aurora Events Center (pre-construction)
- Address: 1200 S. 42nd Street
- Location: Grand Forks, North Dakota, U.S.
- Coordinates: 47.911°N 97.091°W
- Elevation: 835 feet (255 m) AMSL
- Owner: City of Grand Forks
- Capacity: 21,000 Configurations: Concerts (half-house set): 11,000; Theater: 4,600; Football: 12,283; Basketball: 9,500
- Field size: Overall: 447,000 square feet (41,500 m^{2}); Ballroom: 26,000 square feet (2,400 m^{2}); Arena floor dimensions: 415 ft (126 m) north to south 240 ft (73 m) east to west

Construction
- Groundbreaking: July 15, 1998
- Opened: February 10, 2001; 25 years ago
- Cost: $80 million ($158 million in 2025)
- Architects: Ellerbe Becket; JLG Architects; Schoen & Associates
- Structural engineers: Simpson Gumpertz & Heger, Inc.
- Services engineers: Obermiller Nelson; Engineering, Inc.
- General contractor: Mortenson Construction

Tenant
- North Dakota Fighting Hawks football (NCAA) (2001–present)

The Alerus Center is an indoor arena and convention center in the north central United States, located in Grand Forks, North Dakota. Owned and operated by the city of Grand Forks, the facility opened 25 years ago on February 10, 2001.

The arena's major tenant is the University of North Dakota football team, and also hosts many large concerts, sporting events, and trade shows. The seating capacity for football is 12,283, and up to 21,000 for other events. Located southwest of the UND campus, it is just east of Interstate 29 and south of its exit 140, the junction with state highway 297.

The convention center section of the facility includes a 26,000-square-foot (2,400 m^{2}) ballroom and twelve meeting rooms. The convention center is used for conferences, seminars, banquets, parties, and smaller concerts. Directly adjacent to the Alerus Center is a large hotel and waterpark complex called the Canad Inns Destination Center.

Alerus Center is named after a local financial institution, Alerus Financial, which purchased the building's naming rights. Prior to opening, the facility had been referred to as the Aurora Events Center. Its approximate elevation at street level is 835 feet (255 m) above sea level.

== History ==
After attempts going back to 1984 to fund expansion of the downtown civic center or construction of a new convention center (1992), in 1995 a vote to increase the local sales tax to build a new events center (dubbed The Aurora Events Center, costing $43 to $49 million) passed with 60% approval. Cost overruns required another vote in 1996 on an events center to cost $57 million which passed with 51% approval.

The Flood of 1997 delayed the project and led to redesigns to make the facility less susceptible to future flooding. Compass Management was hired to manage facility and in 2000 Aurora was renamed Alerus Center after Alerus Financial bought naming rights for twenty years. Alerus Center opened on February 10, 2001 with a final cost of $80 million. In 2006 construction started on Canad Inns hotel tower and water park, and was completed in 2007.

In 2007, the city ended its management contract with Compass Management but the same year rehired Compass Management, now renamed VenuWorks, with the provision they won't be paid if they lose taxpayer money. In 2009 Alerus Commission announced they lost $720,000 in the events fund due to Alerus operations. No accounting of that loss is made available to the public.

In July 2017, Spectra came in to take over the management contract for the Alerus Center.

== Notable events ==
=== Concerts ===
Date	Artist	Opening act(s)	Tour / Concert name	Attendance	Notes
February 17, 2001	Backstreet Boys		Black & Blue Tour		
September 28, 2002	Cher	Cyndi Lauper	Living Proof: The Farewell Tour	19,351 / 19,351	
August 19, 2003	Fleetwood Mac		Say You Will Tour		
March 26, 2004	Barenaked Ladies	Howie Day; Butterfly Boucher	Everywhere for Everyone Tour		
April 8, 2005	Mötley Crüe		Red, White & Crüe ... Better Live Than Dead		
August 23, 2006	Cirque du Soleil		Delirium		
July 24, 2007	Nickelback		All the Right Reasons Tour		
November 22, 2008	Neil Diamond		Neil Diamond: Live in Concert		
September 12, 2009	Britney Spears		The Circus Starring Britney Spears	12,713 / 12,713	
May 17, 2011	Tim McGraw		Southern Voice Tour		
February 16, 2013	George Strait	Martina McBride	The Cowboy Rides Away Tour	19,500	
May 8, 2015	Luke Bryan	Randy Houser; Dustin Lynch	Kick the Dust Up Tour		
June 5, 2015	Eagles		History of the Eagles – Live in Concert		
January 28, 2016	Jason Aldean	Thomas Rhett; A Thousand Horses	We Were Here Tour		
September 8, 2018	Metallica	Jim Breuer	WorldWired Tour	16,970	
February 22, 2020	KISS	David Lee Roth	End of the Road World Tour	7,812 / 7,812	
September 17, 2021	Luke Combs	Ashley McBryde	What You See Is What You Get Tour	22,000	
March 12, 2022	Morgan Wallen	Hardy (singer)		20,000	
May 29, 2022	Hank Williams Jr.	Lainey Wilson			
May 9, 2023	Kenny Chesney	Kelsea Ballerini	I Go Back Tour	15,000	
November 17, 2023	Jonas Brothers	Lawrence	Five Albums. One Night. The World Tour	0	Cancelled
March 2, 2024	Journey (band)	Toto (band)	Freedom Tour (Journey tour)	9,000	
April 4, 2024	Chris Stapleton	Allen Stone	All-American Road Show Tour	14,000	
April 20, 2024	Kane Brown	Tyler Hubbard	In The Air Tour	15,000	
August 25 and 26, 2024	Zach Bryan		The Quittin' Time Tour	24,000 (August 25)	Facility attendance record

=== Football Attendance ===
The Alerus Center has a football capacity of 12,283. The Alerus Center record attendance for North Dakota Fighting Hawks football is 13,500 vs. North Dakota State University on October 6, 2001. The second-highest attendance was 13,091 on October 14, 2023. As of September 2024, the Fighting Hawks hold a 110-30 record inside the Alerus Center.

=== Other events ===
Other events have also been held at Alerus Center including WWE Smackdown, Toughest Monster Truck Tour, and the 2008 North Dakota Democratic-NPL Convention featuring presidential candidates Barack Obama and Hillary Clinton speaking.

== Competition ==
Grand Forks is unique because it is a relatively small market with two major event centers, Alerus Center and the Ralph Engelstad Arena, both of which often bid to host the same events. To a lesser extent, the Chester Fritz Auditorium in Grand Forks also sometimes competes for these same events as well. Regionally, the Fargodome in nearby Fargo and the Canada Life Centre in Winnipeg, Manitoba are seen as competitors to Alerus Center.

== Canad Inns Destination Center ==
Located directly north of Alerus Center sits the Canad Inns Destination Center, completed in 2007. This $50 million complex, also designed by JLG Architects, is anchored by a 201-room, 13-story hotel tower which, at 126 feet (38 m), is the tallest building in Grand Forks and the tallest building constructed in North Dakota since the mid-1980s. The Destination Center also includes the largest waterpark in the state, three restaurants, a "boutique" casino, and an arcade. This was the first facility in the United States for the Canadian hotel chain.

== See also ==
- List of NCAA Division I FCS football stadiums
