= Empire Arts Center =

Coordinates: 47°55′26″N 97°01′55″W

The Empire Arts Center is a non-profit, multi-purpose arts facility located in downtown Grand Forks, North Dakota United States. Renovated in 1998 due to damage from the 1997 Red River flood, the Empire is a circa 1919 movie house renovated into a multi-use theater and gallery facility. The Empire produces an annual theater season through their in house Empire Theatre Company, in addition to concerts and special events. In addition to their own programming, the Empire hosts a variety of recitals, films, concerts, speakers, meetings, performing arts and community events throughout the year.

The arts center is also home to the University of North Dakota Art Collections gallery. The collection includes works by such artists as Andy Warhol, Salvador Dalí and Audrey Flack, and the media includes paintings, sculptures, ceramics, drawings, textiles, jewelry and metalwork. The gallery also hosts changing exhibits of art by regional, national and international artists.
