= Alerus Financial =

American chain of financial institutions

Alerus Financial Corporation
- Type: Public
- Traded as: Nasdaq: ALRS; Russell 2000 Index component
- Industry: Financial services
- Founded: 1879; 147 years ago
- Headquarters: Grand Forks, North Dakota, U.S.
- Key people: Dan Coughlin (chairman); Katie Lorenson (president and CEO)
- Website: alerus.com

Alerus Financial Corporation, marketed as simply Alerus, is a chain of financial institutions headquartered in Grand Forks, North Dakota, with locations in North Dakota, Minnesota, Wisconsin, and Arizona. Alerus offers banking, mortgage, wealth management, and retirement services.

== History ==
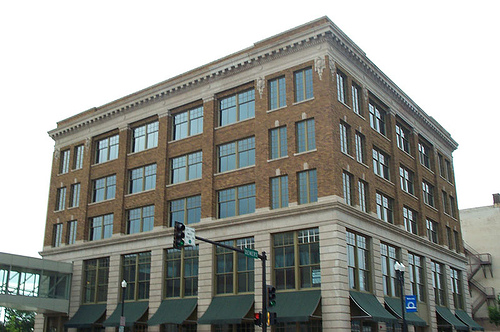
322 DeMers Avenue, former home of First National Bank until the Red River Flood of 1997

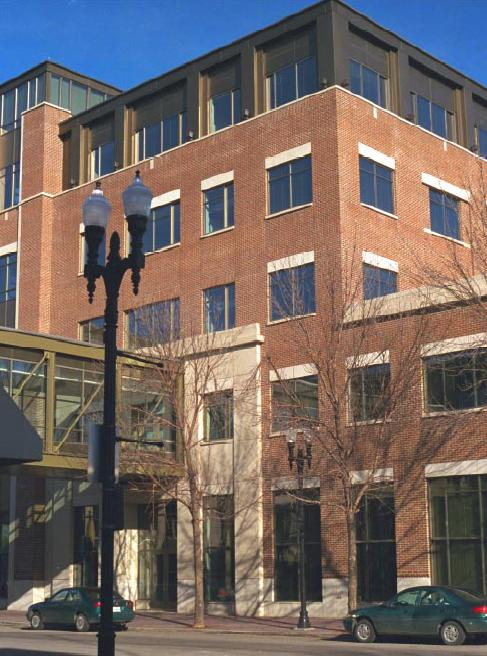
The Corporate Center, current home of Alerus Financial's downtown Grand Forks branch

Alerus Financial's history dates back to August 29, 1879, with the formation of the Bank of Grand Forks by Mr. S. S. Titus. The bank was the second bank chartered in Dakota Territory. At the time, the bank was located in the back of a smokehouse on South Third Street in downtown Grand Forks. The bank quickly outgrew its building and moved into a new brick structure at the corner of South Third Street and Kittson Avenue.

In 1881, the bank took out a federal charter and became known as Citizens National Bank. On July 1, 1890, the bank purchased another Grand Forks bank and took on the name of the other bank: First National Bank. In 1896, the newly merged First National Bank moved into the St. John's Block building at the corner of DeMers Avenue and Third Street. This corner was viewed by most as the commercial center of Grand Forks and the bank's five-story building dominated the intersection. The bank later relocated to another five-story building which was located at 322 DeMers Avenue, one block west of the St. John's Block.

The bank's headquarters would remain in this building until the devastating Red River Flood of 1997. During the disaster, the bank's downtown building was both flooded and almost destroyed in a fire which burned out of control. After the flood, the bank moved their corporate headquarters to a location in south Grand Forks and moved their downtown location into a new city-owned office complex known as the Corporate Center. The vacated 322 DeMers Avenue building was totally remodeled by another party and is now an office building.

In 2000, First National Bank changed its name to Alerus Financial. The new name comes from the Latin word alera which means "to take flight". In 2001, the city of Grand Forks opened a huge indoor stadium and convention center known as the Alerus Center. Alerus purchased the naming rights for this facility.

In 2003, Alerus expanded into Minneapolis when it acquired Pension Solutions Inc., which was renamed Alerus Retirement Solutions.

In 2009, Alerus acquired Prosperan Bank, with locations in Oakdale, MN and Maplewood, MN.

In 2014, Alerus Financial bought Private Bank Minnesota in downtown Minneapolis, the ninth such acquisition since 2003.

In 2015, Alerus Financial rebranded itself as simply Alerus, though its legal name did not change.

In 2016, Alerus purchased Beacon Bank in the Twin Cities and Duluth, Minnesota, adding 5 bank branches to its network. It also purchased Alliance Benefit Group North Central States, Inc. (ABG), in Albert Lea, Minnesota. Through the ABG acquisition, Alerus expanded its offerings to include HSA/FSA/HRA, payroll administration, and COBRA services. The company also renamed its retirement division from Alerus Retirement Solutions to Alerus Retirement and Benefits to reflect its expanded capabilities and service offerings. Later that year, Alerus closed its Maplewood, MN location.

In 2018, Alerus opened a full-service banking and wealth management office in Mesa, Arizona.

In 2019, Alerus completed its initial public offering (IPO) by raising $62.8 million. The company began trading on the NASDAQ under the ticker symbol ALRS. By October 2020, the company had grown to become the 18th-largest bank in the Twin Cities metro area in Minnesota.

In December 2020, Alerus acquired Littleton, Colorado-based Retirement Planning Services Inc., a provider of retirement and health benefits administration. The transaction represented Alerus' 11th acquisition in the retirement and benefits vertical since 2003 and increased Alerus' assets under administration and management to approximately $31.5 billion. The acquisition also expanded Alerus' geographic footprint to the Rocky Mountain region of the U.S.

== Today ==
Alerus is a diversified financial services company headquartered in Grand Forks, North Dakota. It operates full-service banks and wealth management offices in Greater Grand Forks, Northwood, and Fargo-Moorhead, North Dakota, the Minneapolis-St. Paul metropolitan area, and Scottsdale and Mesa, Arizona.

Alerus Retirement and Benefits plan administration offices are located in St. Paul and Albert Lea, Minnesota, East Lansing and Troy, Michigan, and Bedford, New Hampshire.

Alerus serves customers in 50 states.

== See also ==
- Alerus Center: sponsored arena
- First National Bank (Grand Forks, North Dakota): former headquarters
