= Downtown Grand Forks =

- Downtown Grand Forks Historic District
- U.S. National Register of Historic Places
- U.S. Historic district
- Location within North Dakota Location within the United States
- Location: Downtown Grand Forks, at the Red River of the North, Grand Forks, North Dakota
- Coordinates: 47°55′35″N 97°1′51″W
- Area: 80.4 acres (32.5 ha)
- Built: 1872, 1880 and 1885
- Architect: Buechner & Orth; et al.
- Architectural style: Various
- MPS: Downtown Grand Forks MRA
- NRHP reference No.: 05001475
- Added to NRHP: December 28, 2005

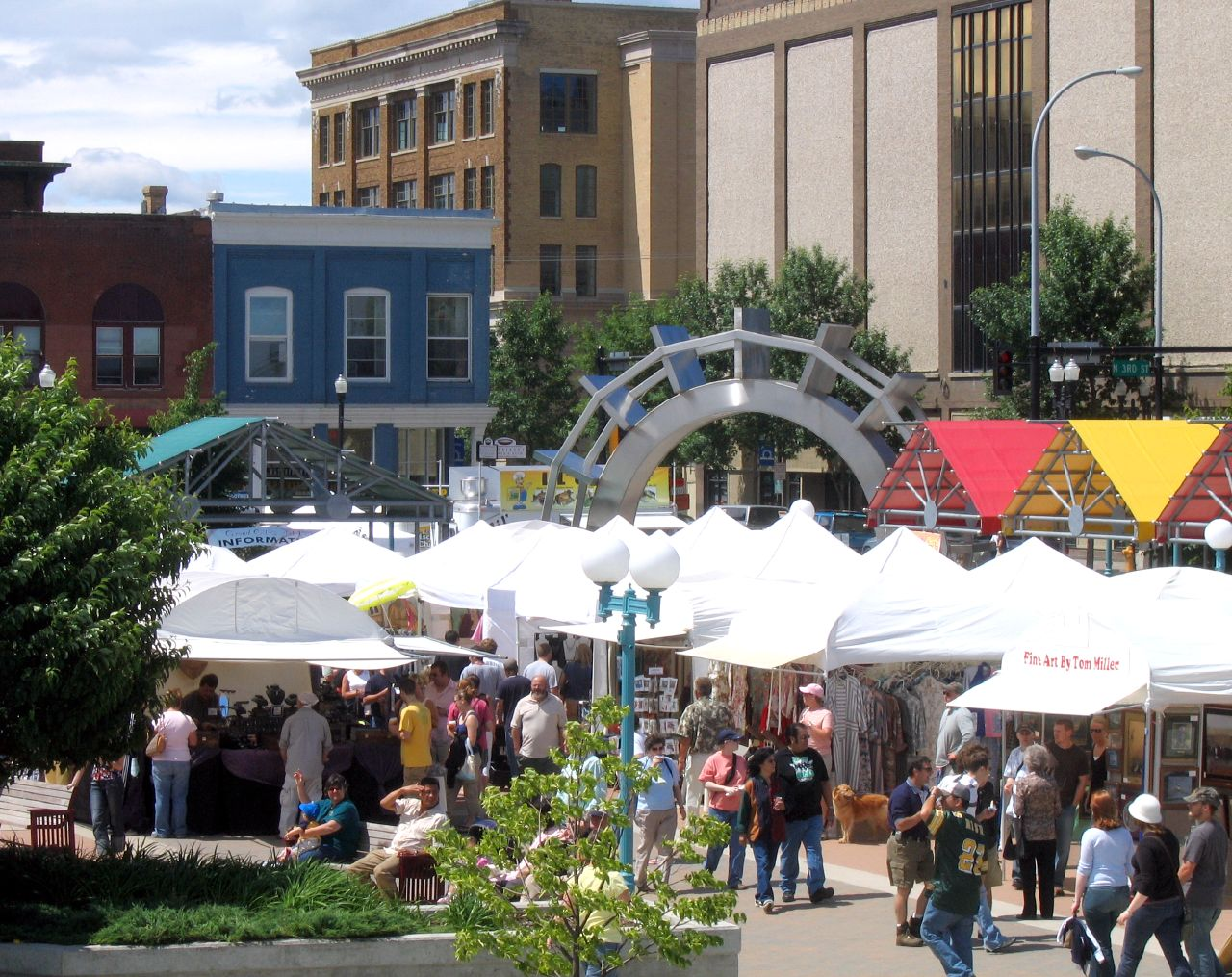
The Grand Cities Art Fest in downtown Grand Forks' Town Square

Downtown Grand Forks is the original commercial center of Grand Forks, North Dakota, United States. Located on the western bank of the Red River of the North, the downtown neighborhood is situated near the fork of the Red River and the Red Lake River. While downtown is no longer the dominant commercial area of the Greater Grand Forks community, it remains the historic center of Grand Forks. An 80.4-acre (32.5 ha) portion was listed on the National Register of Historic Places in 2005, as Downtown Grand Forks Historic District. Today, downtown Grand Forks is home to many offices, stores, restaurants, and bars.

== History ==
=== Early history ===
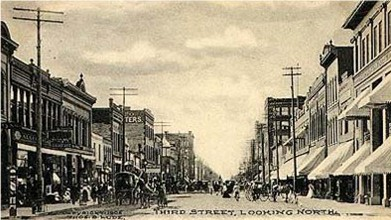
Third Street looking north

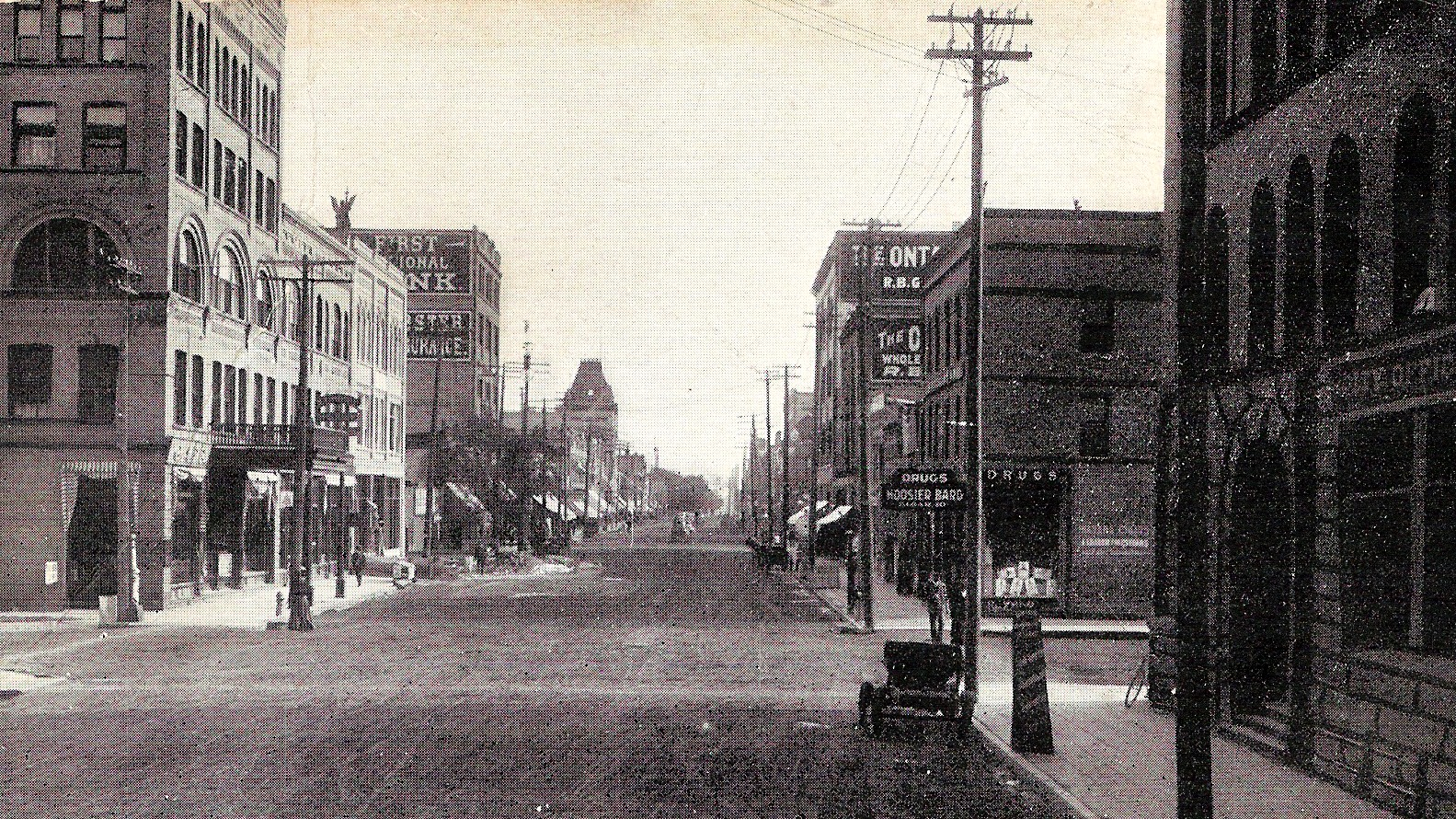
Third Street looking south

Grand Forks was first settled in 1870. In 1872, seven pioneers staked claims to land on the Red River. The 9-acre (36,000 m^{2}) piece of land that would become downtown Grand Forks was first platted by Grand Forks' "founding father", Alexander Griggs, and his wife Etta, in 1875. This was done in anticipation of the Saint Paul and Pacific Railroad (later the St. Paul, Minneapolis and Manitoba Railway and eventually the Great Northern Railway). A collection of wood-frame buildings quickly sprouted up and, by 1880, the new city was home to 1,705 residents. The city was incorporated on February 22, 1881.

The coming of the Saint Paul, Minneapolis, and Manitoba Railway in 1880 led to dramatic growth. New multiple-story brick buildings replaced the old wood structures. The Hotel Dacotah, the St. John's Block, and the Security Building - all five stories - were witness to the fact that the city was prospering and that downtown Grand Forks was becoming one of the busiest commercial districts in the region. By the dawn of the 20th century, downtown Grand Forks had become the commercial, transportation, health care, entertainment, and cultural center of the region and boasted many amenities.

=== The 20th Century ===
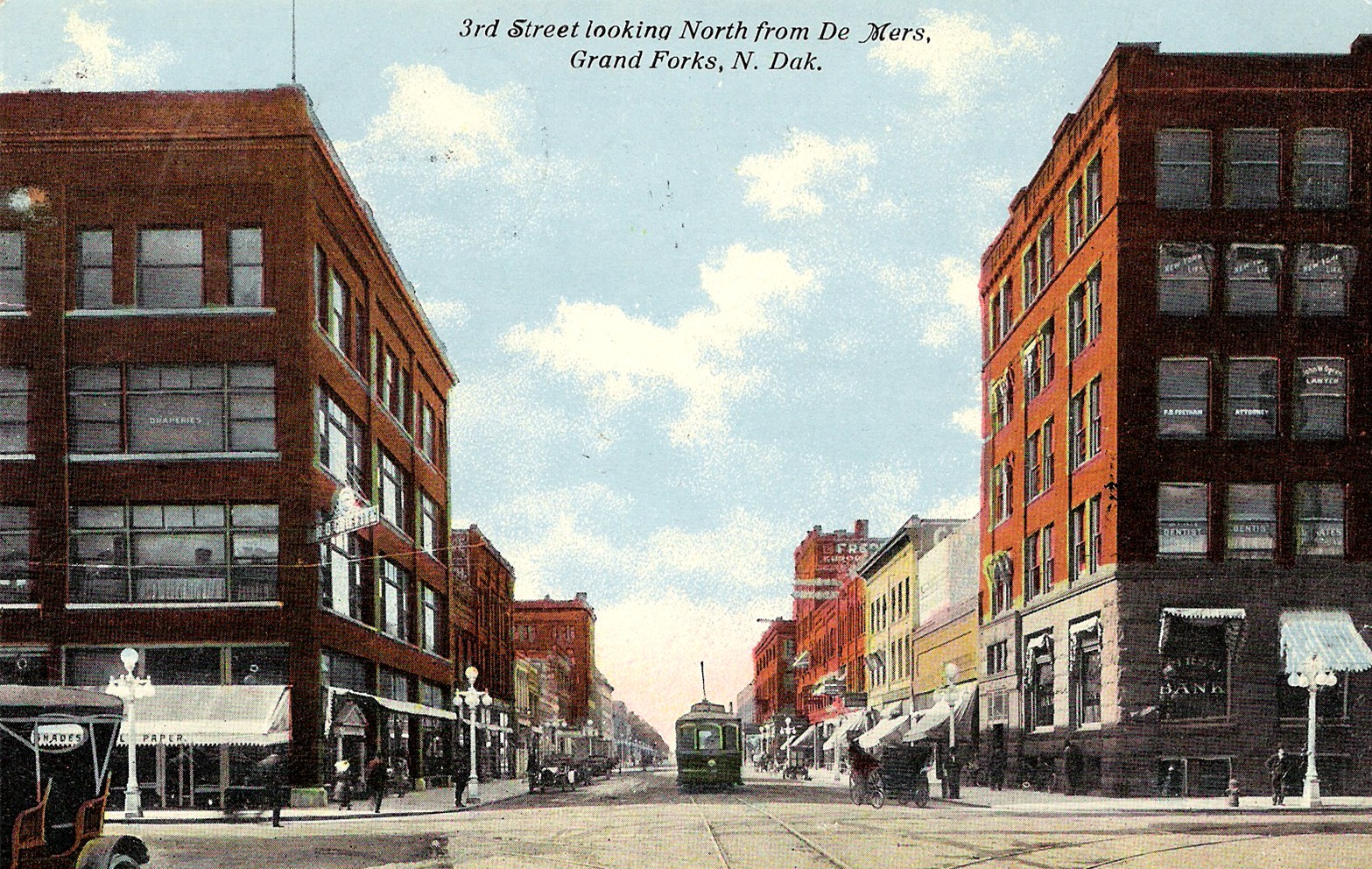
Downtown Grand Forks, circa 1912

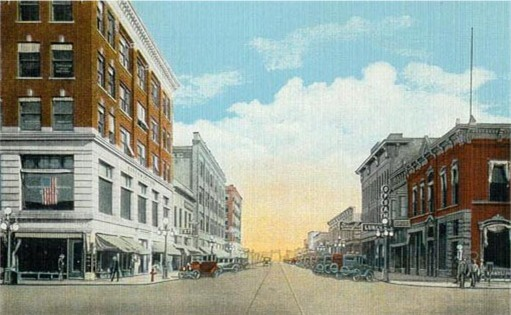
DeMers Avenue

Throughout the early and mid parts of the 20th Century, downtown Grand Forks was easily the dominant commercial neighborhood in Grand Forks. In the later part of the century, the coming of the Interstate Highway System, urban renewal, and new commercial developments on the outskirts of the city signaled the start of a period of decline for downtown. Major shopping malls (South Forks Plaza in 1964 and Columbia Mall in 1978) relocated much of the commercial activity which had once been centered downtown. Over time, institutions which had once been a major part of downtown - the city's hospitals, post office, and public library - were replaced with new facilities outside of downtown.

A major downtown urban renewal project during the 1960s and 1970s saw the destruction of whole downtown blocks in favor of new office building, a city auditorium, and a new street overpass spanning the Grand Forks rail yards. Built in large part as a response to the new shopping malls in Grand Forks, the City Center Mall saw the blocking off of one whole block of South Third Street to vehicular traffic. A roof was built over the street and the entire one-block section became an indoor shopping center. The City Center mall was, in large part, a failure. The 1980s and 1990s saw little development taking place downtown. Indeed, several major businesses such as Griffith's Department Store, Norby's Department Store, and Silverman's clothing store either moved elsewhere within the city or shuttered their doors forever.

=== Flood of 1997 ===
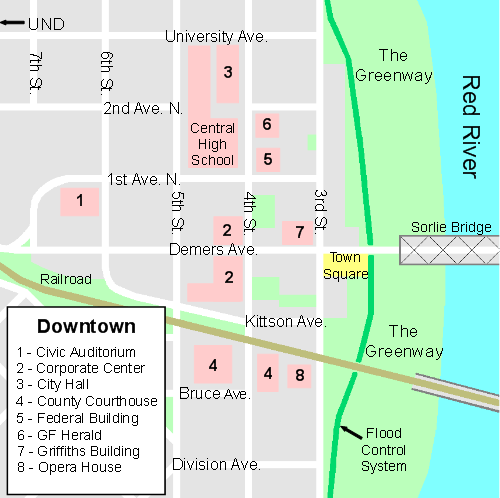
Simplified map of downtown Grand Forks

The Red River Flood of 1997 devastated downtown Grand Forks. The entire district was inundated with several feet of water and a major fire destroyed eleven historic buildings. An iconic image of the flood was the flooded and charred shell of the old five-story Security Building on North Third Street.

After the flood, a renewed effort was put into revitalizing downtown. A new Grand Forks Corporate Center was built in the center of downtown to replace office space which had been destroyed by the flood and fire. Remodeling of the old Empire Theater, which had been started before the flood, was completed and the building became known as the Empire Arts Center. The roof of the City Center Mall was removed and historic storefronts were once again visible. Other building projects following the flood included a new office building for the Grand Forks Herald, a new office building for Grand Forks County, a new "Town Square" community plaza, and the remodeling of countless downtown properties including the Metropolitan Opera House and the former First National Bank (now Alerus Financial) building.

=== Historic district ===
The Downtown Grand Forks Historic District is an 80.4-acre (32.5 ha) historic district that was listed on the National Register of Historic Places in 2005. The area is also known as the Grand Forks Original Townsite and as the Central Business District.

The National Register nomination includes some significant dates:

- 1872, when settlers staked claims on the Red River
- 1875, when the town was platted
- 1880, when the Saint Paul, Minneapolis, and Manitoba Railway reached the city and was constructed through the center of downtown
- 1885, when a branch line of the Northern Pacific Railway reached the town
- 1997, when the Red River flood covered all of downtown, and the resulting flood and fire damage brought significant destruction and then reconstruction

Architects who designed buildings in the area include Buechner & Orth, Joseph Bell DeRemer, Cass Gilbert, Theodore B. Wells, and others.

When listed, the district included 42 contributing buildings, four contributing structures, and 15 non-contributing buildings. The area was surveyed in a 1981 study of Downtown Grand Forks historical resources.

=== Downtown today ===
In recent years, a number of new stores and restaurants have opened up downtown. The city has recently been encouraging the construction of new apartments and condos in the downtown area. Several new and remodeled buildings offer upscale housing in stand-alone buildings or above businesses for varying prices.

Also, a farmer's market is held every Saturday (9 a.m. to 2 p.m.) from mid-June to mid-September in the Town Square on the corner of 3rd Street S. and DeMers Avenue.

Each June, the downtown area and the neighboring Greater Grand Forks Greenway play host to the Grand Cities Art Fest.

== Buildings ==
- Central High School
- Grand Forks Herald
- Metropolitan Opera House
