= Greater Grand Forks Greenway =

Coordinates: 47°55′34″N 97°01′41″W

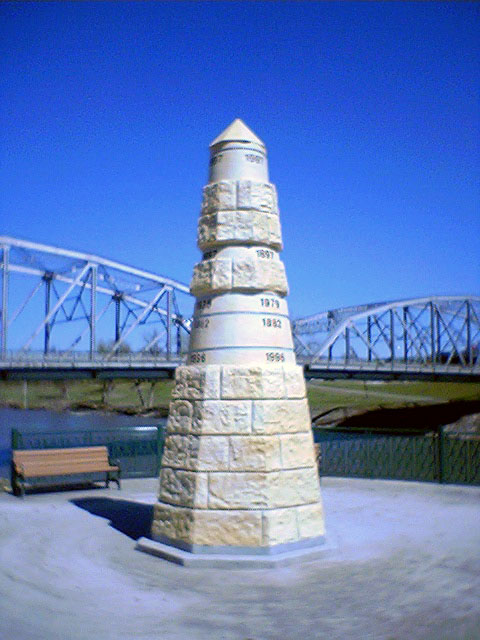
- Memorial in the Greater Grand Forks Greenway commemorating the 1997 flood and other past floods
- Interactive map of Greater Grand Forks Greenway
- Type: Public park
- Location: On the banks of the Red River and Red Lake River in Grand Forks, North Dakota and East Grand Forks, Minnesota
- Area: 2,200 acres (890 ha)
- Operator: City of Grand Forks, City of East Grand Forks, Grand Forks Park District, Minnesota Department of Natural Resources
- Status: Open year round

The Greater Grand Forks Greenway is a huge greenway bordering the Red River and Red Lake River in the twin cities of Grand Forks, North Dakota and East Grand Forks, Minnesota (commonly called Greater Grand Forks). At 2,200 acres (9 km^{2}), the Greenway is more than twice the size of New York City's Central Park. It has an extensive, 20-mile (32 km) system of bike paths, which are used by bikers, walkers, joggers, and rollerbladers. In 2007, the system was designated as a National Recreation Trail by the National Park Service.

Several city parks and golf courses are also located within the Greenway on each side of the river. Other amenities include wildlife observation areas, a state campground, fishing areas, interpretive displays, wildflower gardens, and fields for various athletics including softball, basketball, and disc golf.

The Greenway was developed after the devastating Red River Flood of 1997. The land encompasses large areas of the floodplain along the rivers, which are subject to seasonal flooding, often severe. These areas had previously been developed for residential and business uses, much of which were damaged or destroyed in the 1997 flood, with major property losses. To protect the communities, a massive new dike system was built. It required removal of several residential areas on both sides of the river, most of which had been inundated and severely damaged.

The Greenway includes the area of floodplain between these new dikes and the rivers. Today, the Greenway serves the dual purpose of providing recreational opportunities throughout the year for metropolitan area residents, and being part of the regional flood prevention program. Its trees and greenery can absorb some of floodwaters naturally. The dikes provide another level of protection to hold back river waters from the built-up city areas beyond.

== Trail heads ==
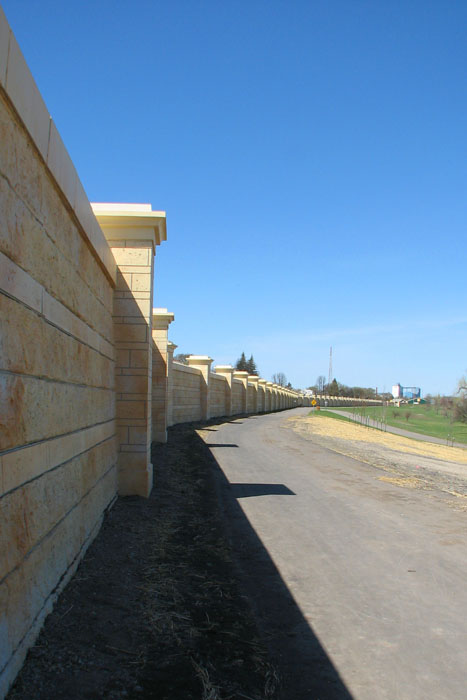
flood wall in the Greenway directly north of downtown Grand Forks

A series of "trail heads" exist at various points along the Greenway. These trail heads offer breaks in the dikes or floodwalls so that pedestrians can access the Greenway. Most of these trail heads offer paved parking lots for access, and many also offer public restroom facilities. Other amenities at select trail heads include picnic areas and playgrounds.

=== Grand Forks trail heads ===
(listed from north to south)

- Riverside Rapids
- Riverside Park
- 8th Avenue North
- 2nd Avenue North
- Community Green (Downtown Grand Forks, adjacent to Town Square)
- Kannowski Park (formerly Central Park)
- Lincoln Drive Park
- Lincoln Golf Course
- Olson-Elmwood
- Sunbeam Park
- 47th Avenue South

=== East Grand Forks trail heads ===
(listed from north to south)

- River Heights
- Sherlock Park
- Sherlock Park Campground
- Rotary Park (Downtown East Grand Forks)
- Griggs Park
- Eagle Point
- Crestwood

== Sites within the Greenway ==
=== Grand Forks ===
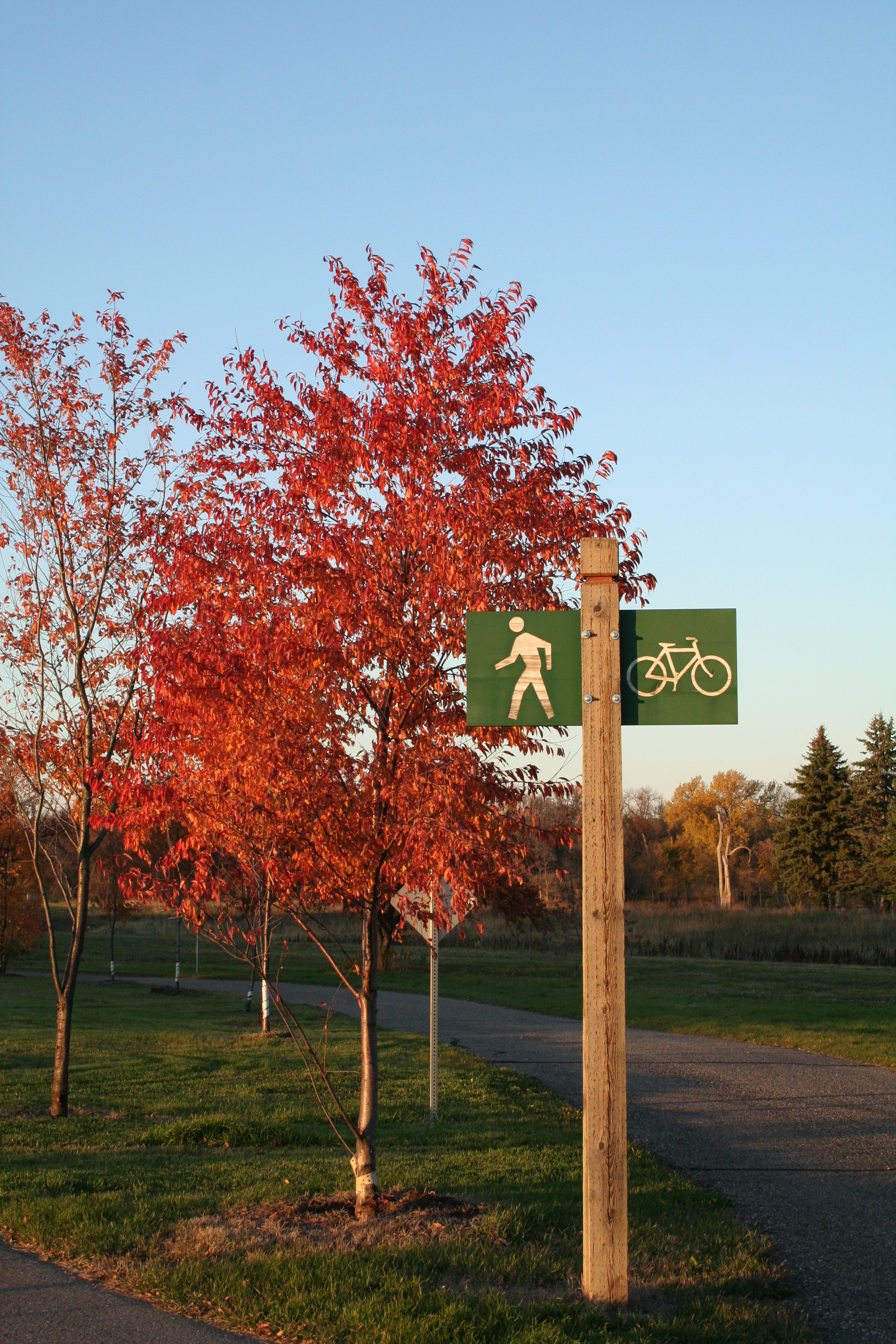
A sign near the Olson/Elmwood access in Grand Forks

==== Parks ====
Several designated park spaces have been established in the Grand Forks portion of the Greenway. These parks are maintained by the Grand Forks Park District.

At the far north side of the Greenway is Riverside Park. This is one of the oldest parks in the city of Grand Forks and is a focal point for the northern portion of the Greenway. The park features a playground, restrooms, several picnic sites and an outdoor pool. North of Riverside Park is the Riverside Dam. This dam has been reconfigured since the flood of 1997 and now includes a waterfall called Riverside Rapids. The Riverside Rapids area includes boat access to the Red River and a pedestrian walking bridge that connects the Grand Forks and East Grand Forks sides of the Greenway.

Formerly called Central Park, Kannowski Park is located just south of Downtown Grand Forks. It is another park established early in city history. The small park features a playground, restrooms, and picnic areas. The park was recently renamed Kannowski Park in honor of Frances Kannowski, superintendent of the Grand Forks Park District from 1933 to 1953. Kannowski was the first female superintendent of a park district in the United States.

Lincoln Drive Park is located further south, within the area of the former Lincoln Drive neighborhood. The residential neighborhood was inundated during the 1997 flood and had to be almost entirely demolished. Lincoln Drive Park features a warming house, which is rented out for private parties; large picnic facilities, playgrounds, a wildflower garden, historic displays about the former neighborhood, and a disc golf course. Just south of Lincoln Drive Park is a steep stretch of the dike, which is known as "the sledding hill." This "hill" is a popular site for sledding in the winter.

==== Golf course ====
Lincoln Golf Course is located along Belmont Road within the Greenway. The course, established in 1909, is the oldest golf course in North Dakota. Lincoln has many large, established trees. Formerly an 18-hole course, it was redeveloped as a par 35, 9-hole course, due to requirements of area needed for dike construction. A small clubhouse features a snack bar, pro shop, and restrooms. To the east of Lincoln Golf Course is the Pat Owens pedestrian bridge. Named after the mayor of Grand Forks during the 1997 flood, the bridge crosses the river to connect to the Greenway in East Grand Forks, Minnesota.

==== Downtown ====
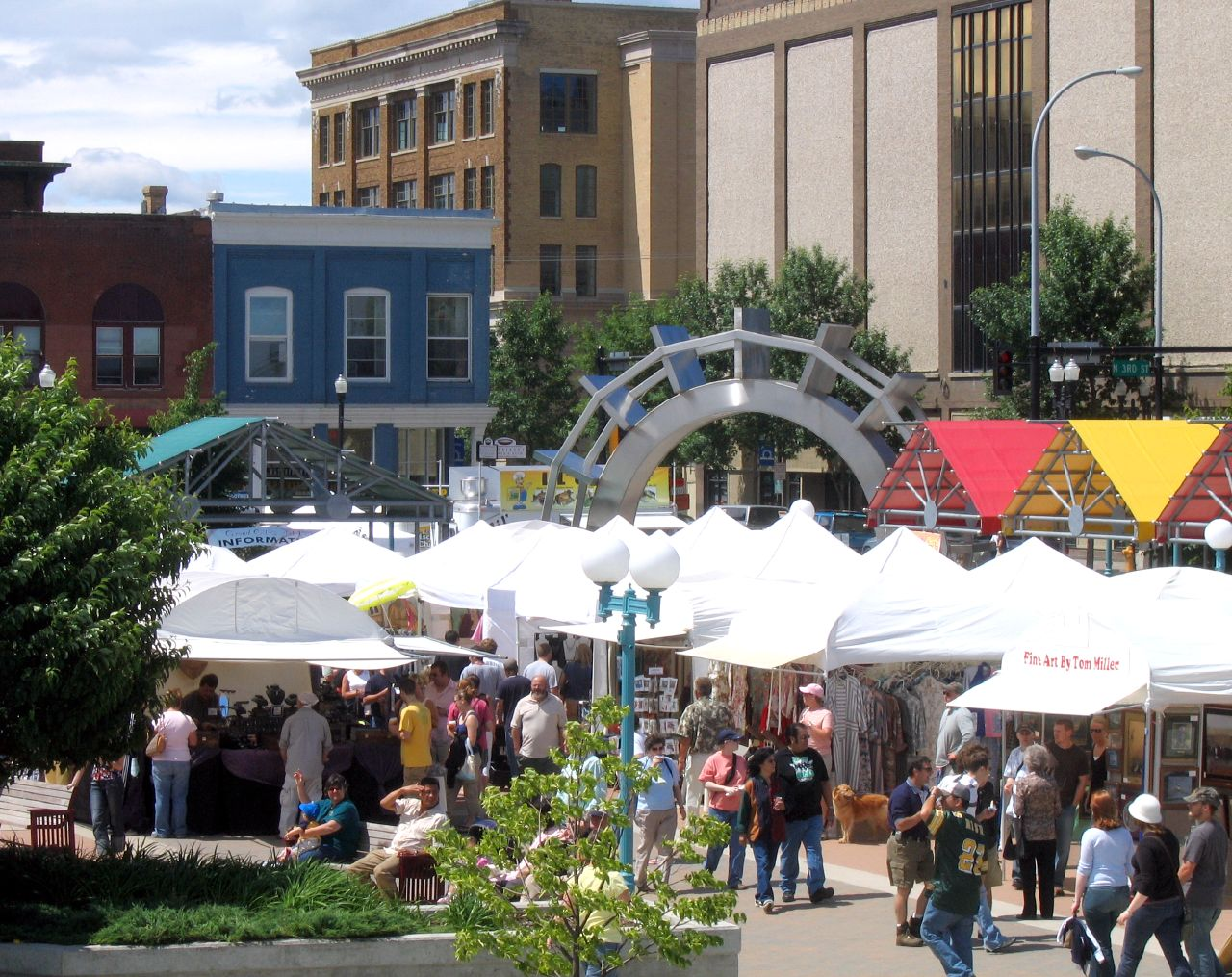
Grand Cities Art Fest 2006 in downtown Grand Forks's Town Square

The portion of the Greenway that runs through Downtown Grand Forks is landscaped and carefully maintained (an irrigation system has recently been installed). A set of brick gateways and flags on both sides of DeMers Avenue celebrate the connection to the Greenway.

The area south of the Sorlie Bridge (DeMers Avenue) features a monument overlooking the Red River. It shows the heights of past floods, surpassed by far by that of 1997. A wide set of stairs and terraced levels of ground lead down to the monument. This area also had a labyrinth designed and installed. North of the Sorlie Bridge is another set of stairs leading down to the river. Referred to as the "Community Green," this area features many trees and shrubs, a small gazebo, and parking.

The Grand Forks Town Square is located directly adjacent to the Greenway, at the corner of DeMers Avenue and Third Street. Town Square features an amphitheater. It is the site of many community events throughout the year, including the Grand Cities Art Fest each June and the Farmers' Market during the summer months.

=== East Grand Forks ===
==== Parks ====
The East Grand Forks side of the Greenway has three distinct parks: Sherlock Park near downtown East Grand Forks, Griggs Park near the "Point" at the confluence of the Red River and Red Lake River, and O'Leary Park on the banks of the Red Lake River in the southern part of the city. Sherlock Park includes the only city-owned pool in East Grand Forks, as well as picnic facilities and a large playground. The playground was largely destroyed by a fire in the spring of 2011. Griggs Park includes school athletic fields and a boat ramp for access to the rivers. O'Leary Park is a heavily wooded park that sometimes attracts wildlife. The park also includes athletic fields, picnic facilities, and a playground.

==== Golf course ====
On the extreme north side of the Greenway in Grand Forks is the 18-hole Valley Golf Course. The construction of the flood control system required a major reconfiguration of the golf course. The complex includes a club house with banquet facilities.

==== Downtown ====
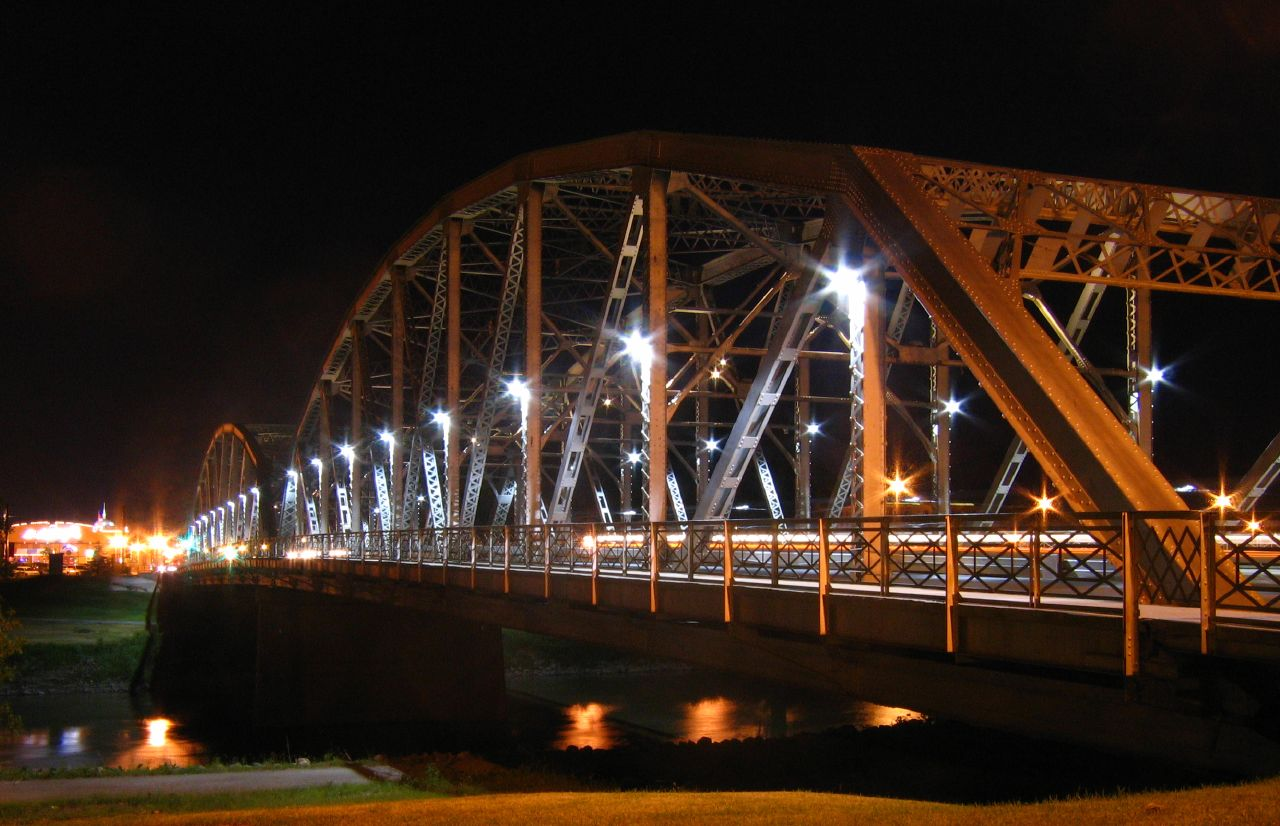
The Sorlie Bridge (DeMers Avenue) spans the Red River in the downtown areas of Grand Forks and East Grand Forks. On the Grand Forks side of the bridge are located Town Square and the Community Green. On the Minnesota side is Rotary Park.

In East Grand Forks, the downtown portion of the flood control system is not made of earthen dikes. A flood wall is installed piece-by-piece during floods. This allows people in downtown East Grand Forks to have a direct view of the Red River. The "dry side" of the flood wall is an area called The Boardwalk, a brick path lined with several restaurants and bars to take advantage of the river view. On the "wet side" of the flood wall (in the Greenway) is an area called Rotary Park, which includes a fountain.

==== Campground ====
Located just north of downtown East Grand Forks is a campground. Operated by the Minnesota Department of Natural Resources, it is in the Red River State Recreation Area. The campground features 48 camp sites with water, electric, and sewer hookups; and 36 camp sites without hookups. The campground is located directly west of Sherlock Park, in the former Sherlock Park residential neighborhood. Inundated during the Red River Flood of 1997, all homes and other structures in the neighborhood were severely damaged and were demolished. This area is now part of the Greenway.

== Management ==
Both city and state agencies own and operate areas of the Greenway. On the Grand Forks side, the city of Grand Forks owns all land within the Greenway. The Grand Forks Park District is responsible for managing and maintaining four park areas of Lincoln Golf Course, Riverside Park, Kannowski Park (formerly Central Park), and Lincoln Drive Park. On the East Grand Forks side, the city of East Grand Forks owns a 200-acre (0.81 km^{2}) section of the Greenway in the downtown area. All other land on the East Grand Forks side is owned by the Minnesota Department of Natural Resources. This 1,200-acre (4.9 km^{2}) section is called the Red River State Recreation Area.
