= LEED Professional Exams =

American professional examinations in green building

- Country of origin: United States of America
- Official website: www.gbci.org//

The LEED Professional Exams are examinations for professionals seeking to earn credentials and certificates in green building or sustainable construction. They are administered by the Green Business Certification Inc. (GBCI). The exams test knowledge based on the U.S. Green Building Council's Leadership in Energy and Environmental Design (LEED) Rating Systems.

== LEED Professional Credentials ==
The LEED professional credentials were developed to encourage green building professionals to maintain and advance their knowledge and expertise. A LEED professional credentials provides employers, policymakers, and other stakeholders with assurances of an individual's current level of competence and is the mark of the most qualified, educated, and influential green building professionals in the marketplace. All LEED professional credentials require adherence to the LEED Professional Disciplinary and Exam Appeals Policy and require ongoing credential maintenance requirements either through continuing education and practical experience or through biennial retesting. Starting in 2009, newly credentialed individuals must maintain their credential on a two-year cycles; if not, they expire. There are three tiers in the LEED professional credentials program:

- Tier 1: LEED Green Associate
- Tier 2: LEED AP with specialty
- Tier 3: LEED Fellow

Additionally, the LEED AP exam was offered from 2001 to June 30, 2009. This credential has been grandfathered in, does not require credential maintenance, and does not expire.

=== LEED Green Associate ===
For professionals who want to demonstrate green building expertise in non-technical fields of practice, GBCI has created the LEED Green Associate credential, which denotes basic knowledge of green design, construction, and operations.

The eligibility requirements for the LEED Green Associate exam no longer require candidates to have experience in the form of EITHER documented involvement on a LEED-registered project OR employment (or previous employment) in a sustainable field of work OR engagement in (or completion of) an education program that addresses green building principles. Candidates are still required to agree to the Disciplinary and Exam Appeals Policy and Credential Maintenance Program and submit to an application audit.

The LEED Green Associate exam consists of 100 randomly delivered questions which must be completed in 2 hours. The content of the exam focuses on the LEED project process (including integrated design), core sustainability concepts, green building terminology, and various aspects of the LEED rating systems.

The fees associated with the LEED Green Associate are a $50 application fee, a $200 exam fee (per exam appointment) for USGBC national members and full-time students or $250 exam fee (per exam appointment) for all others, and an $85 biennial CMP renewal fee.

=== LEED AP with Specialty ===
The LEED AP (Accredited Professional) credential signifies an advanced depth of knowledge in green building practices; it also reflects the ability to specialize in a particular LEED Rating System. The LEED AP exam is divided into two parts. The first part is the LEED Green Associate exam, which demonstrates general knowledge of green building practices. The second part is a specialty exam based on one of the LEED Reference Guides.

The specialties are:

- LEED AP Building Design + Construction
- LEED AP Homes
- LEED AP Interior Design + Construction
- LEED AP Neighborhood Development
- LEED AP Operations + Maintenance

Candidates are required to agree to the Disciplinary and Exam Appeals Policy and Credential Maintenance Program and submit to an application audit.

The LEED AP exams consist of two parts, the LEED Green Associate exam and the applicable LEED AP specialty exam; each part contains 100 randomly delivered multiple choice questions and each part must be completed in 2 hours. Individuals must score at least 170 out of 200 in order to pass. While the LEED Green Associate focuses on concepts and terminology, the LEED AP with Specialty exam tests a candidate's in-depth understanding of one of the five main rating system categories. Candidates have to memorize performance thresholds (percentages of energy savings for example) and perform calculations during the exam.

The fees associated with the LEED AP exams are a $100 application fee and either a $300 exam fee (per exam appointment) for USGBC national members or a $450 exam fee (per exam appointment) for non-members. For existing LEED Green Associates that wish to take the specialty exam only, there is either a $150 exam fee (per exam appointment) for USGBC national members or a $250 exam fee (per exam appointment) for non-members. There is also an $85 biennial CMP renewal fee.

=== LEED Fellow ===
LEED Fellows are a highly accomplished class of individuals nominated by their peers and distinguished by a minimum of 10 or more years of professional green building experience. LEED Fellows must also have achieved a LEED AP with specialty credential.

== LEED Professional Certificates ==
There are currently two LEED Professional Certificates:

- LEED for Homes Green Rater
- Green Classroom Professional

== See also ==
- U.S. Green Building Council
- Green Building Certification Institute
- LEED
- BREEAM
