= GreenRight Certified =

GreenRight Certified (GreenRighting) is a certification program rewarding commercial and industrial green buildings that meet a defined set of energy efficiency standards relating to lighting equipment, lighting systems, lighting power density (LPD), and associated building code compliance.

Developed by CandleRay, the GreenRight Certification is intended to provide business and facility owners with a simple framework for implementing energy conservation through highly efficient, innovative, and more practical lighting systems. This platform is intended to ultimately streamline the adoption of more energy efficient technology, while also helping businesses improve cash flow over time.

A before and after audit process determines the lighting power density (LPD) and the decrease in total facility electric load as it applies to the lighting system. The audit provides various improvements designed to qualify the facility for GreenRight Certification.

== Process ==
- Review of Current Systems
- Analysis & Implementation
- Certification

== Requirements For Certification ==
Prerequisites

- [ GR-PR ][1]: Facility's lighting system must comply with National Electric Code, Life Safety Code, and any additional requirements set forth by local authorities having jurisdiction.

---AND---

- [ GR-PR ][2A] ¹: New facilities must consume at least 10% less energy as compared to baseline standards.

---OR---

- [ GR-PR ][2B] ¹: Major renovations must decrease whole building energy usage by at least 5% as compared to baseline standards.

System Core Requirements

- [GR-1] ²: Reduce lighting power density (LPD) with respect to all interior and exterior lighting systems by a minimum of 25%.
- [GR-2]: Facility must comply with recommended ASHRAE/IESNA Lighting Power Allowance (LPA) by either:

[A] the whole building method or [B] space-by-space method.

- [GR-3] ²: Facility must implement or maintain the following three control systems:

a. Bi-level or multi-level switching b. Individual space controls (as recommended by ASHRAE/IESNA) c. Automatic shut-off requirements (as recommended by ASHRAE/IESNA)

- [GR-4] ³: Facilities must undergo fundamental commissioning to verify lighting systems function as intended with no unnecessary energy consumption.

Outside Fulfillment

- ¹ Buildings which comply with [ GR-PR ][2A] or [ GR-PR ][2B] may also fulfill the Leadership in Energy and Environmental Design (LEED) Energy & Atmosphere (EA) Prerequisite 2: Minimum Energy Performance, Option 1. Facilities under 200,000 ft² may also qualify for the Prescriptive Options 2 or 3 (ASHRAE Advanced Energy Design Guide and Advanced Buildings Core Performance Guide).
- ² Buildings which comply with [GR-1] and [GR-3] may also fulfill minimum requirements for Section 179D Federal Energy Tax Deduction and may qualify for a $0.30 - $0.60 per square foot tax incentive.
- ³ Buildings which comply with [GR-4] may also fulfill LEED Energy & Atmosphere (EA) Prerequisite 1: Fundamental Commissioning of Building Energy Systems.

== See also ==
- Energy conservation
- Energy Independence and Security Act of 2007
- Environmental design
- High-Performance Green Buildings
- Sustainable architecture
- U.S. Green Building Council
