= 1997 Red River flood =

Water overflow in North America

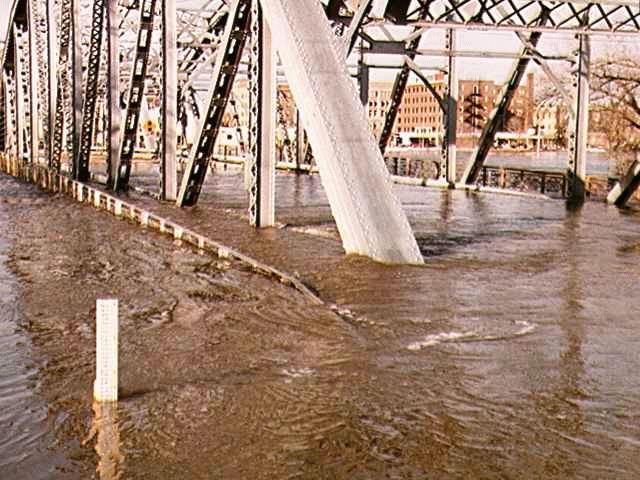
- The Sorlie Bridge connecting Grand Forks and East Grand Forks became submerged on April 17.
- Date: April 1997
- Location: Manitoba, Canada; North Dakota, United States
- Deaths: 0
- Property damage: $3.5 billion

The Red River flood of 1997 was a major flood that occurred in April and May 1997 along the Red River of the North in Minnesota and North Dakota, United States, and southern Manitoba, Canada, resulting from abundant snowfall and extreme temperatures. It was the most severe flood of the river since 1826. The flood reached throughout the Red River Valley, affecting the cities of Fargo, Moorhead, and Winnipeg, but the most damaged were Grand Forks and East Grand Forks, where floodwaters reached more than 3 miles (5 km) inland, inundating virtually everything in the twin communities. Total damages for the Red River region were US$3.5 billion.

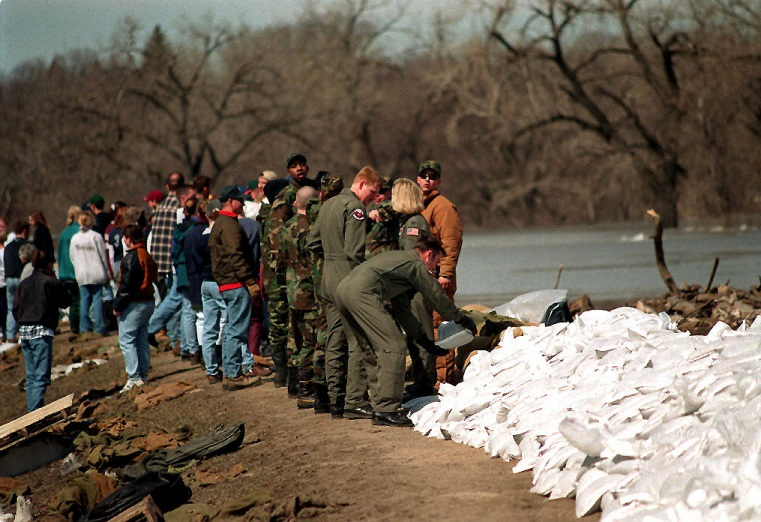
Volunteers in Grand Forks pile sandbags on April 17

The flood primarily impacted the US. Although river levels in Fargo reached record heights, the city was protected by several dikes and received minimal damage. However, in Grand Forks, thousands of people, including personnel from its Air Force base, tried to prepare for the flood by building sandbag dikes, but based on a 49-foot (15 m) estimate of flooding set by the National Weather Service, whereas the river crested at 54 feet (16 m), causing massive property damage. Grand Forks mayor Pat Owens had to order the evacuation of more than 50,000 people as a large portion of the city would eventually be flooded. A large fire started in downtown Grand Forks, destroying more buildings and apartments. Those affected received donations from across the nation and billions of dollars in federal aid. City officials and flood forecasters were criticized for underestimating the flood level. To reduce future flood risk, the US federal and state governments made additional improvements to the flood protection system in North Dakota and Minnesota; a dike system was built on both sides of the river to protect the twin Forks cities. The Federal Emergency Management Agency (FEMA) worked with Grand Forks and East Grand Forks to clear development from a large area along the river, because of the high risk of future regional floods, and to allow the floodplain to be a natural means to absorb floodwaters. The area was rebuilt and redeveloped as the Greater Grand Forks Greenway.

The flooding in Manitoba resulted in over CA$500 million in damages. The Red River Floodway, an artificial waterway completed in 1968 and nicknamed "Duff's Ditch", exceeded its capacity flow but managed to divert the floodwaters around Winnipeg which minimized damage. From 2005 to 2010, the province made substantial upgrades to inlet control structures and fire protection, increased elevation of existing dikes and widened the floodway channel.

== Previous floods ==
The Red River of the North forms the border between North Dakota and Minnesota. A few sets of "sister cities" sit directly on this border, including Grand Forks, North Dakota – East Grand Forks, Minnesota; Fargo, North Dakota – Moorhead, Minnesota (Fargo–Moorhead metropolitan area), and Wahpeton, North Dakota – Breckenridge, Minnesota.

The Red River has flooded repeatedly through the centuries, endangering lives and property. It is highly prone to spring flooding because of its northward flow, the nearly flat former lake bed of the valley, and ice formation on the river. As spring approaches, the snow melts from south to north in the same direction as the river flow. At times, high waters hit unmelted ice on the river and back up, spreading out of the banks. The wide flatness of the terrain, formed from an ancient lake bed, and the low slope of the river also contribute to severe flooding in the region.

Serious floods occurred in 1948 and 1950. The 1950 flood reached a high of 30 ft (9.2 m) at Winnipeg and caused the largest evacuation in Canada's history: an estimated 70,000 to 100,000 people had to be evacuated. An estimated $606 million CAD (1997) of damage resulted. In the aftermath, the government of Manitoba and the Canadian federal government constructed flood safety measures.

The first known records of floods along the Red River were documented in the 1770s. Severe floods have occurred throughout the 19th and 20th centuries, with one of the most recent major floods occurring in 1979. Residents and officials incorrectly assumed that homes that were safe in 1979 would be beyond the reach of a future flood.

== Origins ==
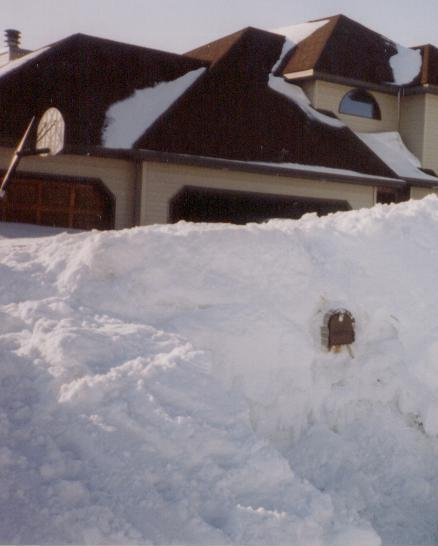
A snow bank in south Grand Forks with a mailbox showing halfway up the bank. Taken in March 1997

There were five main factors that contributed to the flood's severity:

- Rainstorms in autumn of 1996 had saturated the ground so that it could not absorb much water.
- There was abundant snowfall during the 1996–1997 winter. A total of 98.6 inches (250 cm) of seasonal snow accumulations in Fargo and 117 inches (297 cm) downstream in Grand Forks along with other record snowfall events covered the Red River of the North's watershed.
- Abnormally cold temperatures plagued the Upper Midwest during this particular winter. Between November 7, 1996, and March 18, 1997 (a span of 131 days) the air temperature only reached 40 degrees Fahrenheit 3 times in Grand Forks. Because there were only a few days above freezing, there was very little gradual melting of the snow that fell throughout the winter. Starting on March 19, 1997, the temperature then rose above freezing for 27 consecutive days, and only eight days after that would the temperature remain below freezing. However, due to the sudden warmth in April, it melted the deep snowpack too quickly for the river to handle.
- A freak blizzard (unofficially named "Hannah" by the Grand Forks Herald) had dumped a large amount of freezing rain and snow on the Red River Valley on the weekend of April 5, 1997.
- Tributary peak flows tended to coincide with those on the Red River itself.

== Preparations ==
The first flood outlook was issued on February 13, 1997, by the National Weather Service, declaring that there was "...a high spring snowmelt flood potential for the tributaries to the Red River, and a severe spring snowmelt potential for the Red River from Wahpeton, North Dakota, to the Canadian border". On February 27, a flood planning meeting in Fargo revealed that Fargo, Wahpeton, and Grand Forks would see the Red River rise to 38, 17.9, and 49 feet (15 m), respectively. The Corps of Engineers recommended on March 24 that Grand Forks' engineers build dikes to a height of 52 feet (16 m), which would provide three feet of leeway for the 49-foot (15 m) estimate. Additionally, the Federal Emergency Management Agency (FEMA) publicly encouraged Grand Forks residents to purchase flood insurance, but only a thousand of the 52,000 residents did so. Later, researchers at the University of North Dakota determined that although more than 90% of residents knew about the option of purchasing flood insurance, only a small percentage purchased it since they believed the National Weather Service had projected that the river would not crest high enough to warrant a flood.

On March 31, the North Dakota National Guard used helicopters to dump sand on ice covering the Red River in an attempt to use the sun's thermal energy to thaw the ice and prevent ice jams. The "dusting" was the most extensive attempt in North Dakota's history. Starting on April 3 and continuing every day up to the flood, sandbagging and dike-building began. Residents, local university students, and Grand Forks Air Force base personnel placed about 3.5 million sandbags at various points around the river.

On April 16, at a public meeting, Grand Forks mayor Pat Owens recommended that residents voluntarily evacuate the city. The next day, about 500 airmen and women from Grand Forks Air Force Base were assigned to assisting with monitoring the dikes around the river.

== Flood crest ==
=== Fargo ===
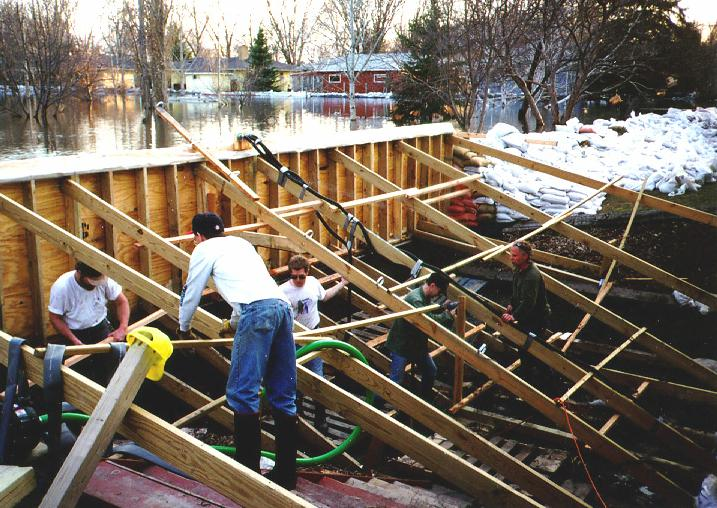
Volunteers in Fargo reinforcing a flood wall to protect nearby homes

The Red River crested in Fargo at 39.5 feet (12.0 m) on April 17, but dike-building efforts were able to prevent the water from flooding into a majority of the city. An emergency dike was built and volunteers had to add sandbags to increase the height of a dike that had settled. The mayor of Fargo at the time, Bruce Furness, later stated: "We came very, very close to losing parts of Fargo...it took a lot of effort by a lot of people—a great many of them high school and college students—to save the city. I was very proud of them. I think it was one of Fargo's finest moments."

=== Greater Grand Forks ===
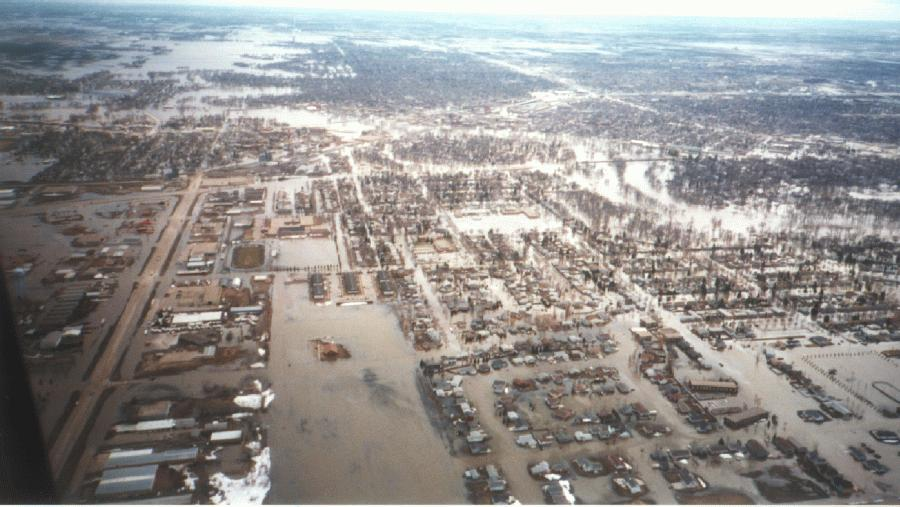
Aerial view of flooding in Grand Forks

There was some sense of imminent threat in Grand Forks, but the cities could not prepare for such an enormous flood. The National Weather Service (NWS) had a long-standing forecast for the river to crest at 49 feet (14.9 m), which was the river's highest level during the 1979 flood. The cities had been able to get their dikes to this level, but the river continued to rise past it, to the astonishment of the NWS (which did not upgrade its forecast until April 16, the day the river actually reached 49 feet). The dikes in the low-lying Lincoln Drive neighborhood of Grand Forks were the first to break, doing so early on April 18. Other dikes over the Grand Forks and East Grand Forks area would fail that day and the next, flooding thousands of homes. Within East Grand Forks, all but eight homes were damaged by floodwaters.

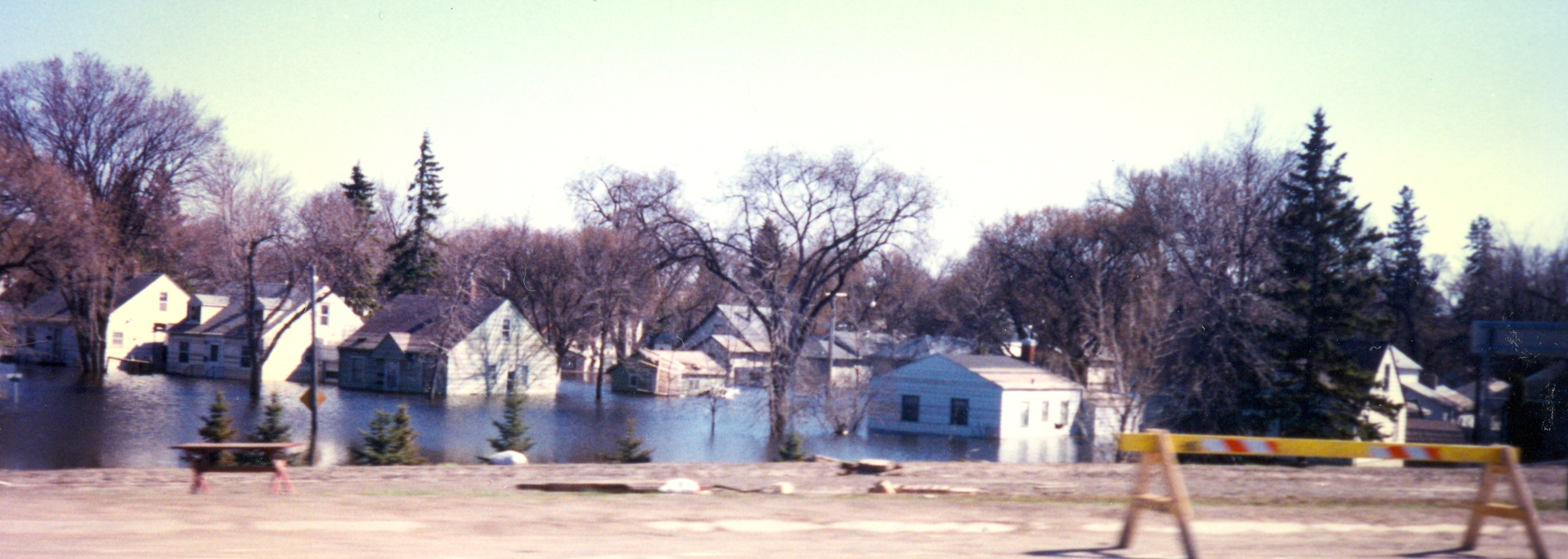
A residential neighborhood in East Grand Forks flooded in late April 1997

Water would end up reaching areas over two miles (3 km) away from the Red River, necessitating the evacuation of all of East Grand Forks and 75% of Grand Forks. School was canceled in both cities for the remainder of the term, as were classes at the University of North Dakota. The river crested at 54.35 feet (16.6 m) on April 21 and the river level would not fall below 49 feet (14.9 m) until April 26. The flood reached higher levels than the prior most severe flood in 1826. Because water drained so slowly out of the most low-lying areas, some homeowners could not visit their damaged property until May. By May 30, the Red River had receded below flood stages everywhere in North Dakota.

==== Evacuations ====
When the dikes in Grand Forks could not keep out the flooding river, Pat Owens ordered the evacuation of over 50,000 people on April 18, which up to that time, had been the largest civilian evacuation in the United States since the evacuation of residents in Atlanta, Georgia, during the Civil War. She later reflected on the decision saying, "...if I evacuate this city and nothing happens they're gonna impeach me. But if I don't, we're going to lose lives." Because all transportation was cut off between the two cities (and for many miles, the two states), East Grand Forks residents were evacuated to nearby Crookston, namely to the University of Minnesota Crookston, while residents of Grand Forks, who were given mandatory evacuation orders on April 18, went to Grand Forks Air Force Base (residents stayed in airplane hangars containing more than 3,000 cots).

With the assistance of the National Guard and Air Force personnel, several hundred patients were evacuated from local hospitals with no injuries or loss of life during the evacuation process. Many residents also evacuated to motels and homes in neighboring communities. Some residents of Grand Forks criticized the National Weather Service for its incorrect prediction of the river level, as it had prevented them from securing their possessions from their homes. One resident said: "If they'd said earlier the river would hit 52 feet (16 m), I would have moved my stuff out of my house. At 49, it was safe."

==== Downtown Grand Forks fire ====
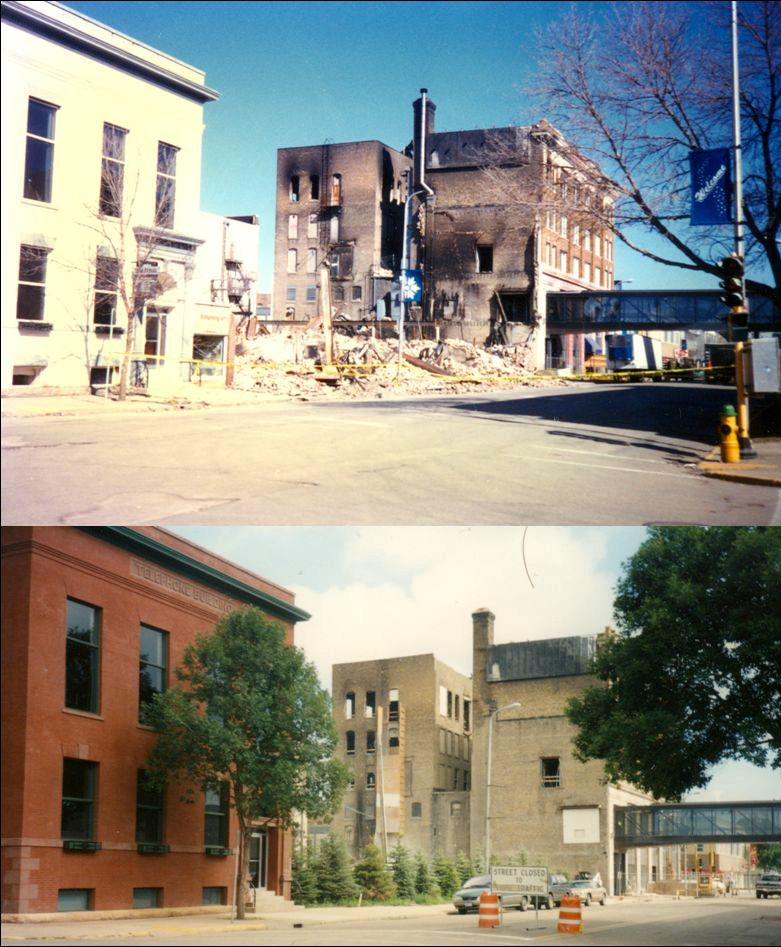
A before and after view of a building that caught fire in downtown Grand Forks on April 19. The above image is taken a few weeks after the fire, while the second image is a year later.

The flood made national news. The most familiar footage is possibly of the fire that started on April 19 in downtown Grand Forks, surrounded by floodwaters, where eleven buildings and sixty apartments were destroyed. The Grand Forks Herald building was totally destroyed in the fire, along with 120 years of archives. Firefighters were not able to begin extinguishing the fire immediately as they had to evacuate nearly forty people in one of the nearby apartment complexes who had defied the evacuation order. Additionally, their tankers were unable to reach the buildings due to the height of the floodwater and the water pressure from the hoses and fire hydrants was too weak to extinguish the flames. The National Guard placed the fire trucks on several tractor-trailers to prevent them from flooding, which allowed the firefighters to assist in extinguishing the fire. Also, two aircraft rescue and firefighting trucks from the Grand Forks International Airport were brought in to fight the fire because their engines were higher up off the ground, and thus did not get clogged by the flood waters. The firefighters received assistance several hours after the fire started by a fire-bombing plane that dropped retardant and helicopters who made sixty drops totaling 120,000 gallons of water. Three of the firefighters were treated for hypothermia after treading through the cold temperatures of the flood water. The fire was later determined to have been caused by an electrical problem that had resulted from the large amounts of floodwater.

== Impacts ==
=== North Dakota and Minnesota ===
Multiple sets of "sister cities" along opposite sides of the river were affected. Grand Forks, North Dakota and its counterpart East Grand Forks, Minnesota, were the pair most severely affected by the 1997 flood. Fargo, North Dakota & Moorhead, Minnesota (Fargo-Moorhead) and Wahpeton, North Dakota & Breckenridge, Minnesota also had severe flooding. Much of the flooding accumulated not only because of the rising river levels, but also from overland flooding, as meltwater did not drain away. Temporary dikes were erected along the riverfront and around the edges of towns, but were sometimes overwhelmed.

It was difficult for the cities to prepare for such an enormous flood. The National Weather Service (NWS) had forecast that the river would crest at 49 feet (14.9 m), which was its highest level during the 1979 flood. The cities had built dikes to this level, but the river continued to rise past it. Taken by surprise, the NWS did not upgrade its forecast until April 16, the day the river reached 49 feet.

The dikes in the low-lying Lincoln Drive neighborhood of Grand Forks were the first to break, doing so early on April 18, as the river kept rising. Other dikes in the Grand Forks and East Grand Forks area failed that day and the next, flooding thousands of homes. During this time, Grand Forks mayor Pat Owens ordered the evacuation of more than 50,000 people, much of the population of the city. This was the largest evacuation in the United States since the evacuation of residents in Atlanta, Georgia during the Civil War.

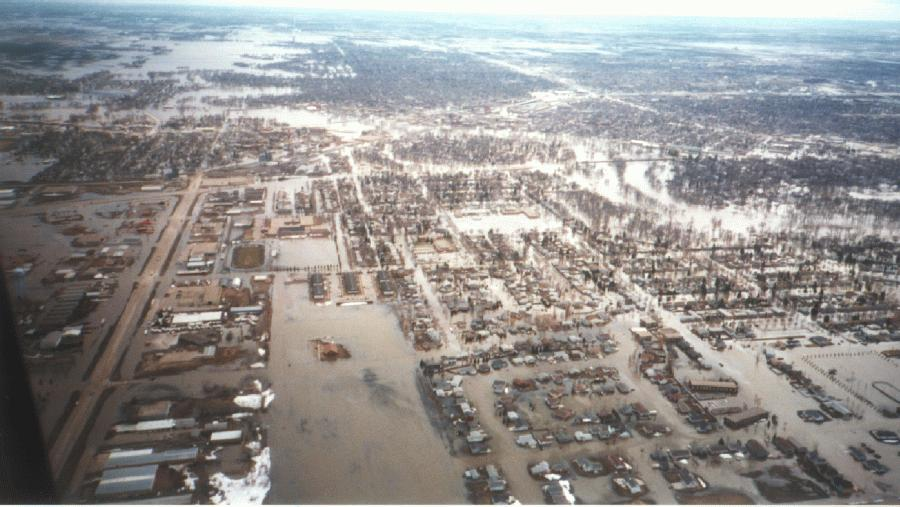
Grand Forks after a levee overtopped and Grand Forks was evacuated

Water reached areas more than two miles (3 km) inland from the Red River, requiring evacuation of all of East Grand Forks and 75% of Grand Forks. School was cancelled in both cities for the remainder of the term, as were classes at the University of North Dakota. All transportation was cut off between the two cities (and for many miles, the two states). East Grand Forks residents were evacuated to nearby Crookston, namely to the University of Minnesota Crookston. Residents of Grand Forks were given mandatory evacuation orders on April 18, and retreated to Grand Forks Air Force Base (residents stayed in airplane hangars, which were supplied with more than 3,000 cots). Many residents also evacuated to motels and homes in outlying communities.

The river crested at 54.35 feet (16.6 m) on April 21, and the river level did not fall below 49 feet (14.9 m) until April 26. Because water drained so slowly out of the most low-lying areas, some homeowners could not visit their damaged properties until May. By May 30, the Red River had receded below flood stages everywhere in North Dakota.

=== Manitoba ===
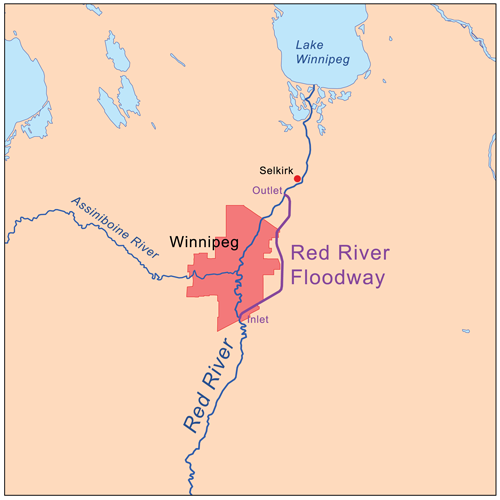
Red River Floodway near Winnipeg

The province of Manitoba completed the Red River Floodway in 1968 after six years of construction, built permanent dikes in eight towns south of Winnipeg, and built clay dikes and diversion dams in the Winnipeg area. Other flood control structures completed later were the Portage Diversion and the Shellmouth Dam on the Assiniboine River. Even with these flood protection measures, in 1997 the province had a flood cresting at 21.6 ft (6.6 m). It caused 28,000 people to be evacuated and $500 million CAD in damage to property and infrastructure.

The 1997 flood was a 100-year flood. It came close to overwhelming Winnipeg's existing flood protection system. At the time, the Winnipeg Floodway was designed to protect against a flow of 60,000 cu ft/s (1,700 m^{3}/s), but the 1997 flow was 63,000 cu ft/s (1,800 m^{3}/s).

To compensate, the province broke operational rules for the Floodway, as defined in legislation, during the night of April 30 / May 1, to prevent waters in Winnipeg from rising above the designed limit of 24.5 ft (7.5 m) above the "James Avenue datum", but causing additional flooding upriver. Winnipeg Mayor Susan Thompson, announcing that the design limit had been reached, misinterpreted this as good news that the flooding had peaked. City sand-bagging stopped, and national reporters left the city, but the water continued to rise inside and outside of the city until the peak late on May 3 / early on May 4. The city officials have said that the peak occurred on May 1; scientific reports record a peak on May 3/4.

Towns upriver of Winnipeg, forewarned by footage of buildings in Grand Forks burning and covered in meters of water, built ring dikes to protect their homes and properties. The province of Manitoba called in the Canadian Forces, the Royal Canadian Mounted Police, and the provincial Department of Natural Resources. Many people chose to evacuate, including residents from Morris, who had only two days notice to evacuate to Winnipeg. Thousands of volunteers helped to build sandbag dikes around homes and property. An emergency 42 km (26 mi) long dike, later called the Brunkild Z-dike, was constructed in a matter of days when officials realized that overland flooding threatened the city of Winnipeg. It cost $10 million (CAD).

Almost all of the ring dikes around the towns held, except for that at Ste. Agathe. The town's dike system was prepared for the river approaching from the south, but the river had spread widely and floodwaters swamped the town from the west. At the flood's peak in Canada on May 4, the Red River occupied an area of 1,840 km^{2} (710 mi^{2}) with more than 2,560 km^{2} (990 mi^{2}) of land underwater, which earned it the nickname "Red Sea."

While the flooding was still underway, the federal Liberal government led by Jean Chrétien called a snap election. Several of the party's MPs from the province, including Reg Alcock, requested a delay until the flooding was under control. When Chrétien let the election go ahead as originally planned, Alcock transformed his campaign office into a volunteer relief centre, spending his time in relief efforts instead of campaigning, and won re-election.

== Donations and damages ==
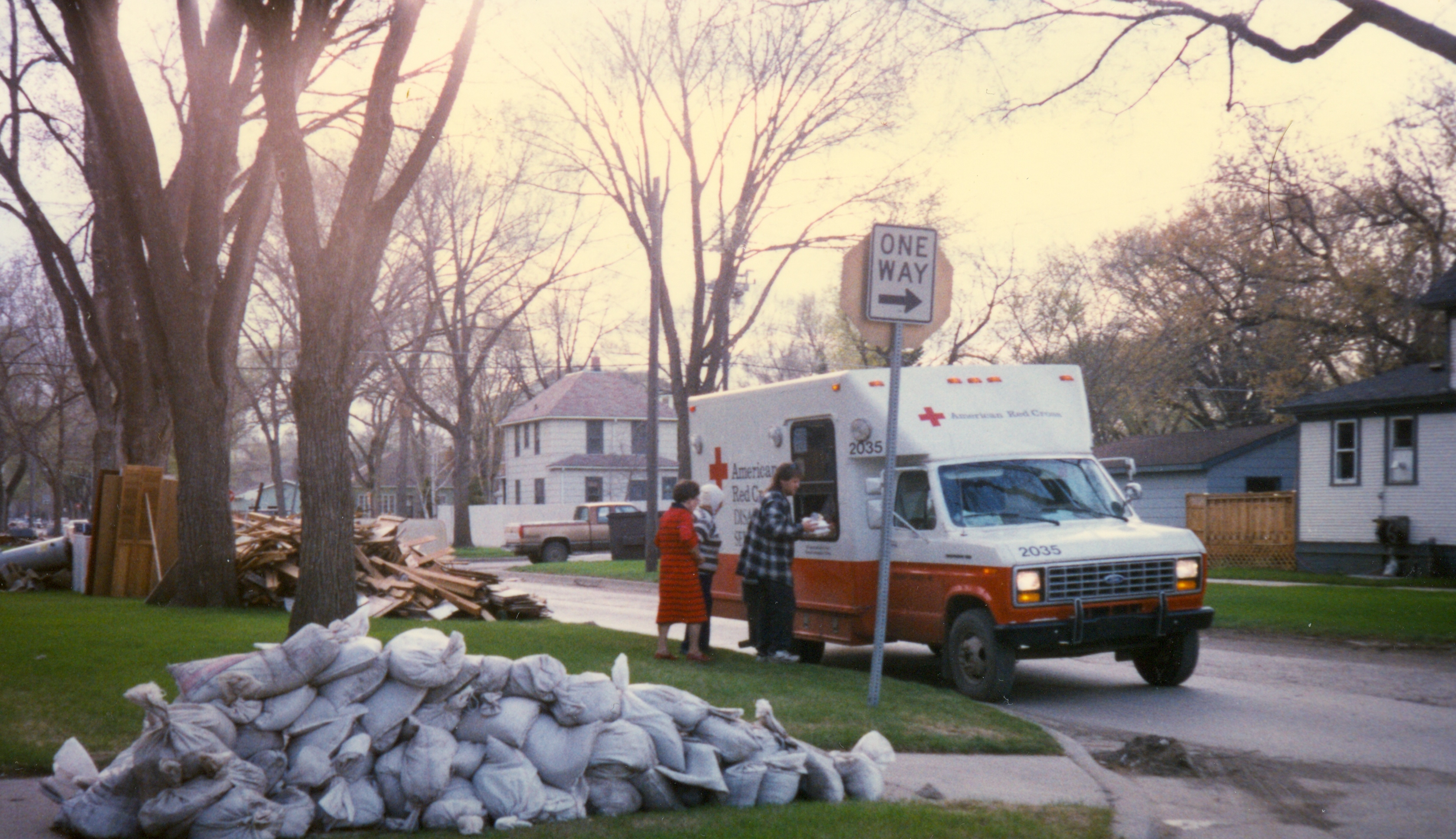
An American Red Cross volunteer distributes food to Grand Forks victims in late April 1997

The national attention of both flood and fire reached Joan Kroc, the McDonald's heiress, who anonymously (her anonymity was later revealed to the public by the Grand Forks Herald) donated $15,000,000 to be divided into $2,000 portions for each damaged household (though the amount some homeowners received was less due to the huge number of devastated homes; in all 7,500 households received funds). Additionally, another single anonymous donor gave $5 million which was distributed in $1,000 allotments. In November 1997, North Dakota Governor Ed Schafer reported that victims had been assisted by 50,000 relief agency volunteers who had served more than 2 million meals. Additionally, the communities received clothing and supplies that were donated from every U.S. state. During a concert in Fargo, the rock group Kiss donated the money from sales of a special T-shirt to the Fargo and Grand Forks areas to assist in flood relief.

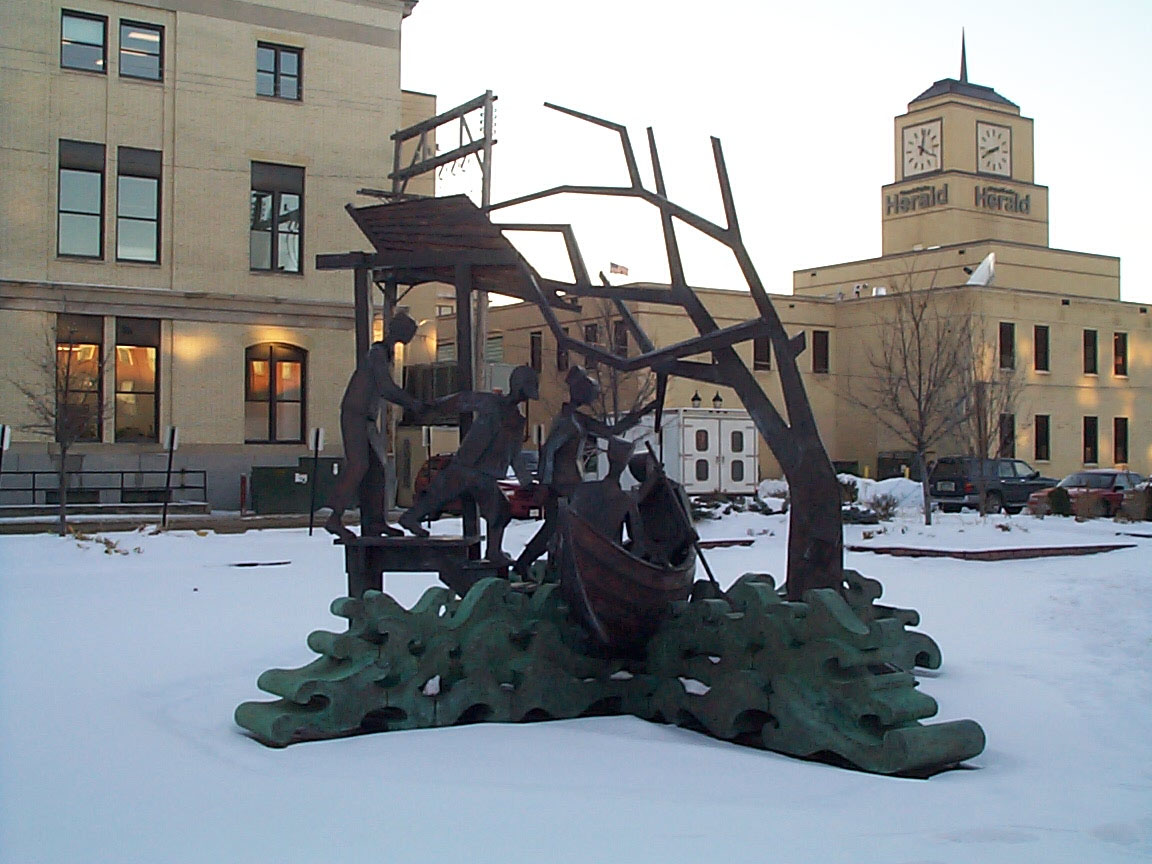
A memorial statue in Grand Forks with the rebuilt Grand Forks Herald building in the background

All told, there was US$3.5 billion in damages to Grand Forks and East Grand Forks, making it the eighth most expensive natural disaster in the U.S. since 1903. Across North Dakota and Minnesota, there were 4,500,000 acres (18,000 km^{2}) of land covered in water. Thousands of people were relocated after the disaster. In May 1997, the Red Cross conducted a damage assessment of 8,000 North Dakota homes. The report indicated that 519 homes, 53 mobile homes, and 73 apartments had been destroyed by flood waters while 701 homes, 69 mobile homes, and 175 apartments sustained major damage. Inspectors reported that 5,959 homes, 166 mobile homes, and 497 apartments received minor damage. Over 5,200 businesses had been destroyed, damaged, or somehow affected by the winter and spring blizzards and the flood. In Grand Forks alone, 75% of the homes, 315 businesses, and 16 of 22 local schools had been flooded. East Grand Forks had over 500 condemned homes, with only eight homes not damaged by the flood. Grand Forks, losing only 3% of its population from 1997 to 2000, did not fare as badly as its sister city, which lost nearly 17% of its residents. Not a single person was killed in the flood itself.

=== Federal and state response and assistance ===
Everywhere I look, I see destruction. I can't begin to comprehend the amount of money it's going to take to get Grand Forks back on its feet.

— North Dakota Congressman Earl Pomeroy,
when assessing the damage in Grand Forks,

On April 22, President Bill Clinton flew over Grand Forks surveying the flooded cities. He then visited the thousands of refugees at the nearby Grand Forks Air Force Base and commented on the community's spirit, stating "Water cannot wash that away. Fire cannot burn that away. And blizzards cannot freeze that away." President Clinton also declared that the Federal Emergency Management Agency would compensate 100 percent of the cost of emergency work, instead of the normal 75 percent. He also requested that Congress approve $488 million for various counties within North Dakota, Minnesota, and South Dakota for short and long-term reconstruction efforts.

In June, Canadian Prime Minister Jean Chrétien and President Clinton appointed the International Red River Basin Task Force containing members of both countries. The task force's purpose was to find ways to improve flood forecasting.

North Dakota and Minnesota leaders initially asked the federal government for $100 million in disaster relief, but increased their projections to $500 million for Grand Forks and East Grand Forks. Pat Owens went to Washington D.C. to persuade Congress to provide the funds contained in a $5.5 billion relief bill. Although the bill was initially vetoed by President Clinton since he disagreed with additional unrelated legislation being added to the bill, he signed it on June 11. East Grand Forks Mayor Lynn Stauss, reflected on the government assistance to the city, saying: "This community could not have survived without the help of the state and federal government."

Grand Forks received $171 million from the federal program, Community Development Block Grants, which was used for 198 projects within the city. One city worker estimated that 10–15% of the funds went to developing downtown Grand Forks, while the remainder of the grants were distributed to the other projects throughout the city.

== Criticism and blame ==
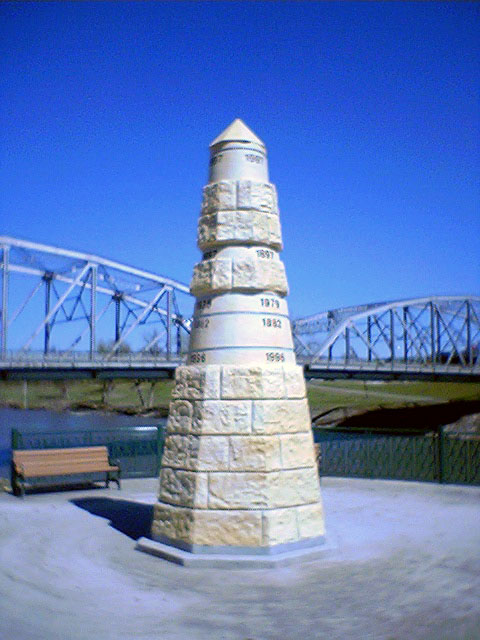
Obelisk in Grand Forks commemorating the 1997 flood and other past floods

After the flood reached unexpected levels, Senator Kent Conrad wrote in a letter on April 30 that he was "very concerned about the capability of the National Weather Service to accurately and in a timely manner predict river levels on the Red River in North Dakota". Earl Pomeroy told the Grand Forks Herald that "the inability to get realistic flood numbers certainly hindered the communities' ability to prepare." Although the Grand Forks Corps of Engineers was also criticized for their efforts, they revealed that for the last ten years before the flood, the engineers had tried to convince citizens to approve the construction of a more extensive flood protection system. Additionally, the head of the river-forecasting for the weather service of North Dakota and Minnesota attributed the rise of the Red River moving faster and higher than previously expected due to the sandbag levees that residents built to protect their homes, as it narrowed the channel of the river.

The 5-foot (1.5 m) discrepancy between the actual crest and that which the NWS had predicted led to widespread anger among locals, especially since the citizens of both cities reached and even slightly surpassed the NWS's level of protection through weeks of hard work. Lynn Staus, the mayor of East Grand Forks, initially complained about the NWS's predictions, "They missed it, and they not only missed it, they blew it big." He later commented again, saying "I am not trying to blame the weather bureau. [But] we live day by day by those predictions, and many of our people did not go out and buy flood insurance." Anger over the predictions was most famously expressed by a local resident's devastated home having the words "49 feet my ass" smeared on the exterior.

== Recovery ==
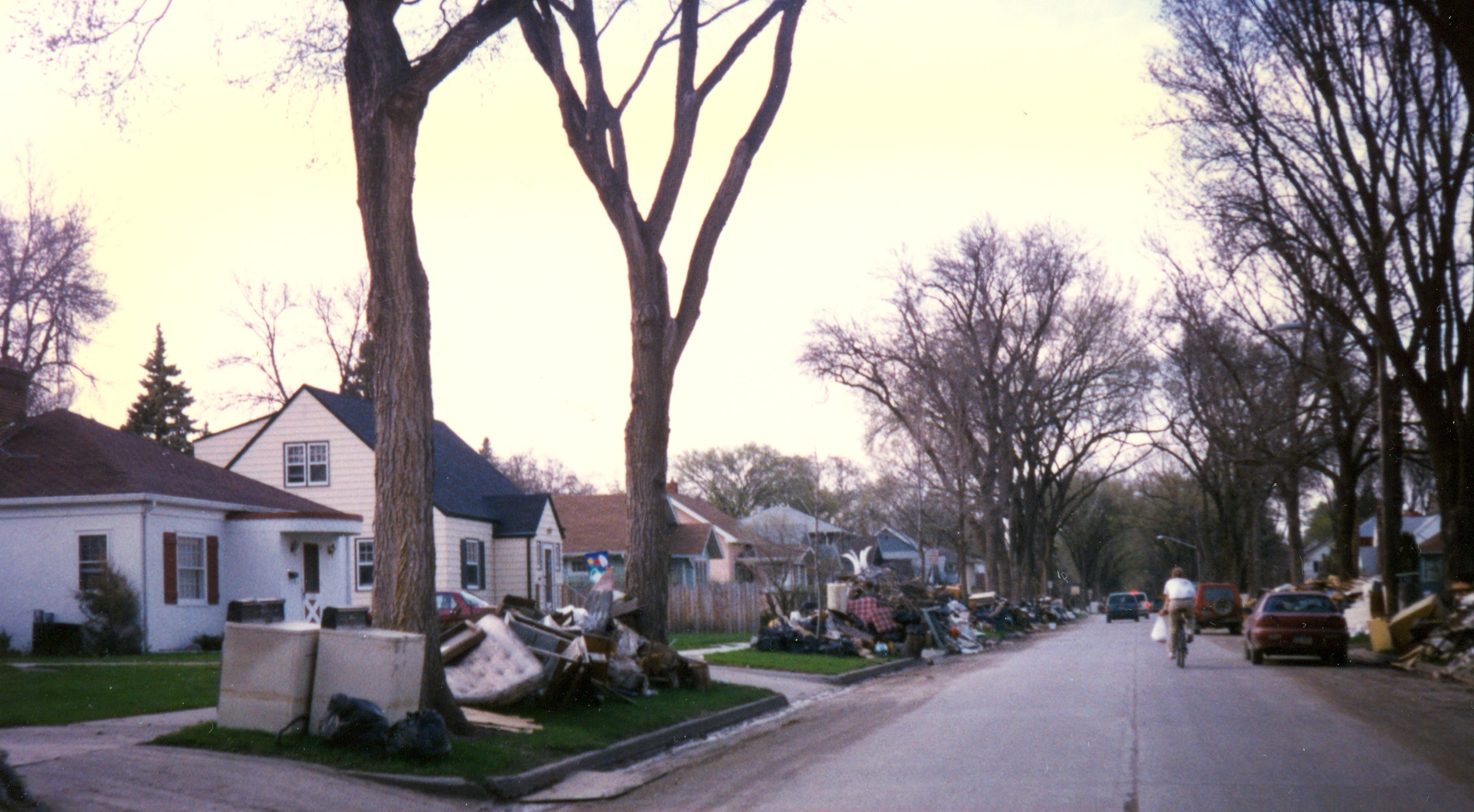
Victims had large piles of flood-damaged possessions placed in front of their homes for city pick-up.

Over 20,000 volunteers went to Grand Forks to assist in recovery efforts. The Red Cross dispersed over 25,000 clean-up kits (containing bleach, cleaning materials, goggles, and other equipment) funded by the State Department of Health that owners used to clean their flood-damaged property and possessions. Since many possessions and appliances were contaminated by flood water, sewage, mold, and mildew, residents were told by city officials to paint the word "Flood" or make some other mark to prevent looting. Over 60,000 tons of flood debris was hauled to local landfills.

Grand Forks' daily newspaper, the Grand Forks Herald, continued to publish papers throughout the flood despite having its printing facilities destroyed. Newspapers were printed in St. Paul, Minnesota and flown on a charter plane to Grand Forks for deliveries. For their efforts, the staff of the Herald was awarded the Pulitzer Prize for Public Service. Several local schools were destroyed, prompting the construction of replacements. Because construction was not finished on most of these schools until the end of 1998, hundreds of students spent a year and a half of school in temporary locations ranging from churches to FEMA-constructed temporary metal buildings, known by locals as "tin bins". Numerous city buildings were also damaged, especially in East Grand Forks, where the flood-ravaged downtown area had been home to the city hall and the public library. Both have since been replaced by new buildings, though not before spending a few years housed in a former elementary school and an ice rink's warming house, respectively.

Both Grand Forks and East Grand Forks had to decide whether to develop the land along the river. The president of the East Grand Forks planning-and-zoning commission commented on the idea of development, "The river had been our friend for all these years. It had been like an old dog, sleeping comfortably at our feet, and then one day it jumped up and bit us. We had to decide: Do we put it to sleep or try to make amends?" What were once entire neighborhoods, including Lincoln Drive, are now covered by grass and trees, part of an extensive area of parkland called the Greater Grand Forks Greenway. In East Grand Forks, this transformation is especially visible. One former neighborhood is now a large campground, the center of what is now known as the Red River State Recreation Area. The cities of today are significantly different from their pre-flood state, but many residents are pleased with this, seeing it as fulfillment of President Bill Clinton's promise that the cities would "rebuild stronger and better than ever". Population estimates by the Census Bureau and by the city of Grand Forks itself now show a growing community.

The City of EGF hired Ernst & Young to lead the development efforts soon after the flood and David Bentley led a team to refurbish damaged facilities as quickly as possible. The first business was reopened in 21 days.

=== Future flood prevention ===
In July, Canadian Prime Minister Jean Chrétien and United States President Bill Clinton appointed the International Red River Basin Task Force, comprising members from both countries. The task force's purpose was to find ways to improve flood forecasting.

The province of Manitoba asked the International Joint Commission (IJC) to provide a report on the flood event and to recommend measures to ensure further flood protection for the city of Winnipeg. Largely as a result of this study, the province widened the floodway between 2004 and 2010.

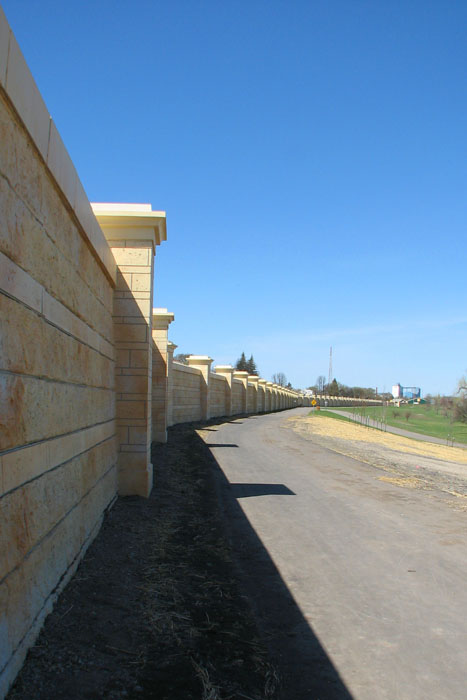
Floodwall north of downtown Grand Forks

The National Weather Service has since revised their method of forecasting spring floods. Increased technology and funding has allowed for the mapping of the entire Red River bottom, more flood monitoring gauges, and up-to-date satellite images of the river at various flood stages.

The area continues to experience flooding as another major flood occurred April 2006. However, the Red River did not go near the level of the 1997 flood and only caused minor damage, primarily in rural areas, including water over roads and bridges. The lack of damage done to Grand Forks and East Grand Forks in particular can largely be attributed to the aforementioned improved dikes and Greenway zone.

New dikes have been constructed in Fargo, Grand Forks, and East Grand Forks. Fargo initially had three different plans to choose for developing a dike, and construction of the dike was funded with $10.5 million it received from FEMA and $5.5 million from state funds. For Greater Grand Forks, the system of levees and new "invisible floodwalls" was completed in 2007, having cost several hundred million USD. In the aftermath, the Federal Emergency Management Agency (FEMA) worked with the cities of Grand Forks and East Grand Forks to clear residential and business development from a large area of floodplain, because of the high risk of future regional floods, to allow the floodplain to be a natural means to absorb floodwaters. The areas bordering both sides of the rivers has been converted into a giant park called the Greater Grand Forks Greenway, including several parks, a Minnesota state campground recreation area, a 20-mile biking and walking trail, and shopping districts where homes once stood.

Since the flood, Grand Forks' recovery has been used as a model by other communities which have suffered from natural disasters. After Hurricane Katrina hit several U.S. states in 2005, Grand Forks adopted the city of Biloxi, Mississippi. Current Grand Forks mayor Michael Brown stated that it was important "to utilize the experience from those people who went through those disasters, like our fire chief, police chief and public works directors. So we went to Biloxi and said, 'This is what we have learned.'" Grand Forks leaders met with Biloxi city officials, and sent a list of contacts and a 24-page booklet that detailed how to coordinate volunteer agencies and how to interact with FEMA. One Biloxi city official stated that Grand Forks had "just helped us to understand what we were looking at, and gave us some direction to go in, which was really needed, with the rebuilding and the recovering".

By 2007, the population of Grand Forks had resumed the same levels as before the flood. East Grand Forks mayor Lynn Stauss stated "We like to call ourselves the poster child of flood recovery because we think we showed how different governments working together could make it happen."

== Cultural references ==
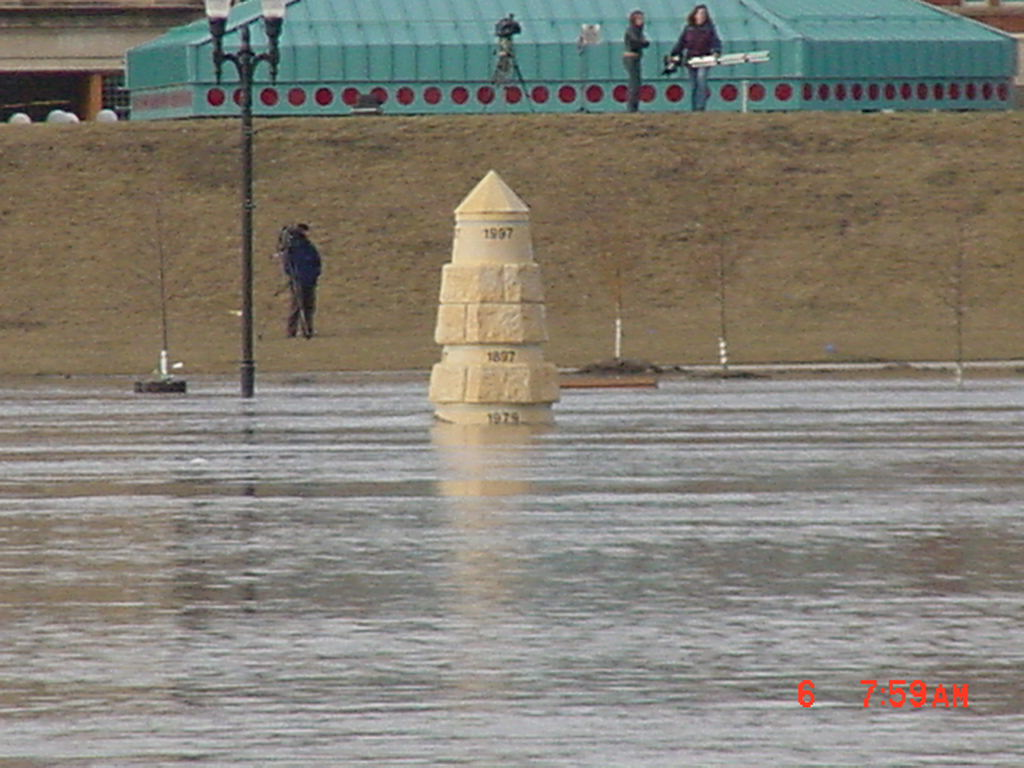
High-water mark of the 2006 flood in Grand Forks as seen on the 1997 Flood Memorial

- Following the flood, Catastroffiti, a form of graffiti related to natural disasters, started to appear as affected residents gutted their houses, placing damaged materials on the berms. At first, this graffiti was placed on trashed appliances to prevent theft and resale, but soon expanded in medium and purpose. The graffiti done mostly in spray paint (also mud) started to not only be a precaution, but a dialogue of emotions related to the effects of the flood. Post-flood emotions driving this largely consisted of frustration with the National Weather Service after it predicted a flood crest about five feet less than the actual. As this developed, catastroffiti was appearing on not just household appliances, but also houses, garages, and signs.
- After the flood, the Summer Performing Arts Company produced Keep The Faith, a musical written by Summer Performing Arts staff and area composers and musicians about the flood and the recovery. In 2007 a 10-year anniversary performance of Keep The Faith was held and prompted James Lee Witt to suggest SPA bring the musical to the Super Bowl in New Orleans.

== See also ==
- 1950 Red River flood
- 2009 Red River flood
- 2011 Red River flood
- 2022 Red River flood
