= History of Grand Forks, North Dakota =

The recorded history of Grand Forks in the U.S. state of North Dakota, began with the trade between Native Americans and French fur trappers during the 19th century. About 60 buildings or other historic sites in Grand Forks survive and are recognized among the National Register of Historic Places listings in Grand Forks County.

== Early history ==
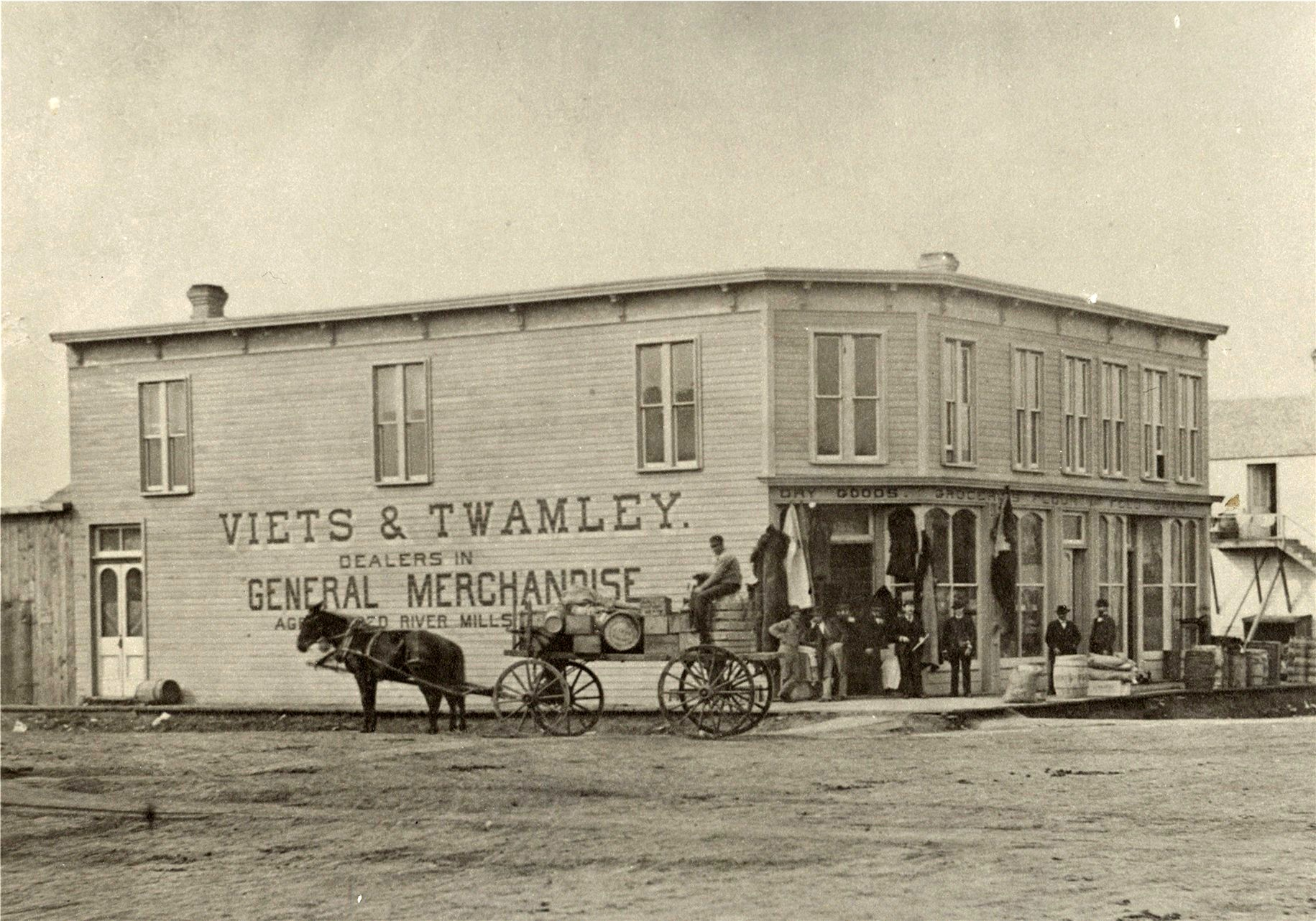
Early store in Grand Forks

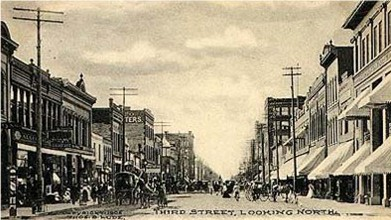
Third Street looking north

Grand Forks is the oldest major city in The Dakotas. Prior to settlement by Europeans, the area where the city now sits (at the forks of the Red River and Red Lake River) had been an important meeting and trading point for Native Americans. Early French explorers, fur trappers, and traders called the area "Les Grandes Fourches" (meaning "The Grand Forks"). By the 1740s, Les Grandes Fourches was an important rendezvous point for French fur trappers. This French fur trade continued until the French and Indian War gave Canada to the British. In 1800, British fur trader Alexander Henry the younger, an agent for the North West Company of Montreal, located a temporary camp at Les Grandes Fourches and, in 1808, established a permanent post. By the 1820s, the Hudson's Bay Company and John Jacob Astor's American Fur Company also had operations at the site.

During the mid-19th century, Les Grandes Fourches was a stopping off point for the Red River ox carts which carried goods on the Red River Trails between St. Paul, Minnesota and Fort Garry (now Winnipeg, Manitoba). On June 15, 1870, the first post office was opened and "Les Grandes Fourches" was anglicanized to "Grand Forks". Unlike most cities in North Dakota, the city of Grand Forks does not owe its existence to the arrival of the railroad. Instead, Grand Forks was first an important steamboat port on the Red River of the North. In late 1870, a steamboat captained by Alexander Griggs froze in the Red River at Grand Forks and Griggs and his men were forced to remain there for the rest of the winter. They built a temporary shed to live in for the winter and Griggs seemed to have decided that the area would be a good spot for a town. In the spring, he claimed a nine-acre (36,000 m^{2}) piece of property that would become the townsite and, ultimately, downtown Grand Forks.

== Settlement ==
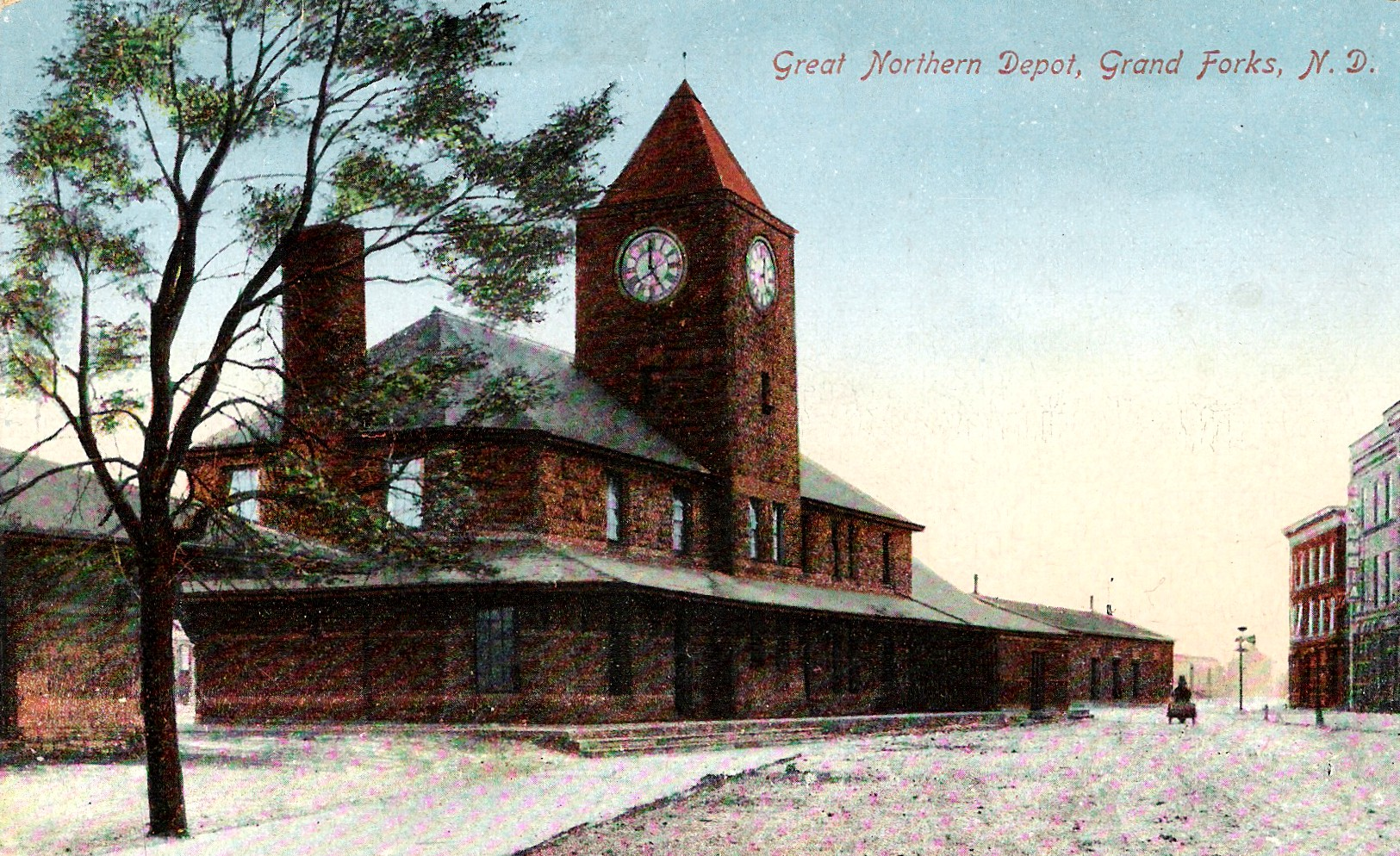
Great Northern depot

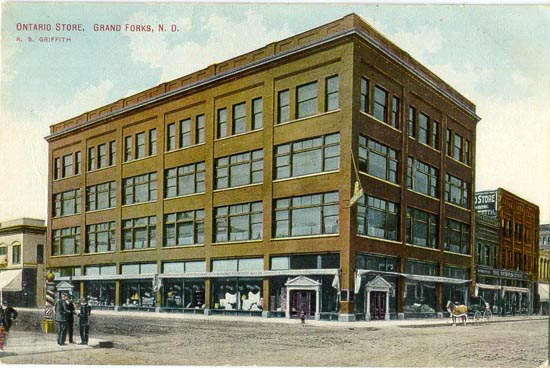
The Ontario Store

A small community quickly developed. In 1875, The Plaindealer, the town's first newspaper, was started by George H. Walsh. In 1879, George Winship started The Herald. The twin cities of Grand Forks and East Grand Forks were first physically connected when, in 1879, Alexander Griggs built a pontoon toll bridge at the present day site of the Sorlie Bridge at DeMers Avenue. The city of Grand Forks was officially incorporated on February 22, 1881.

Grand Forks grew rapidly in its early years. Growth was spurred by waves of immigrants and Americans from the eastern portion of the country, the steamboat traffic on the river, and the coming of the railroad. The St. Paul, Minneapolis, and Manitoba Railway (Great Northern Railway) reached Grand Forks in 1880 and the Northern Pacific Railway came in 1887. The first settlers of Grand Forks were farmers and working men, but merchants and professional people from Minneapolis and other cities soon populated the city. After the arrival of the railroad, old wood-frame buildings were quickly replaced with brick buildings. The Hotel Dacotah, the St. John's Block, and the Security Building - all five stories - dominated the community's skyline and were a sign of a growing city.

In 1883, the University of North Dakota was founded by George H. Walsh before North Dakota was formally recognized as an independent state (born from the Dakota Territory). In 1893, The Diamond Milling Company of Grand Forks started making a new breakfast cereal they called Cream of Wheat, invented by mill employee Thomas Amidon. By the dawn of the 20th century, the city had become the commercial, transportation, educational, health care, entertainment, and cultural center of the region and boasted many amenities usually found in larger cities.

== 20th century ==
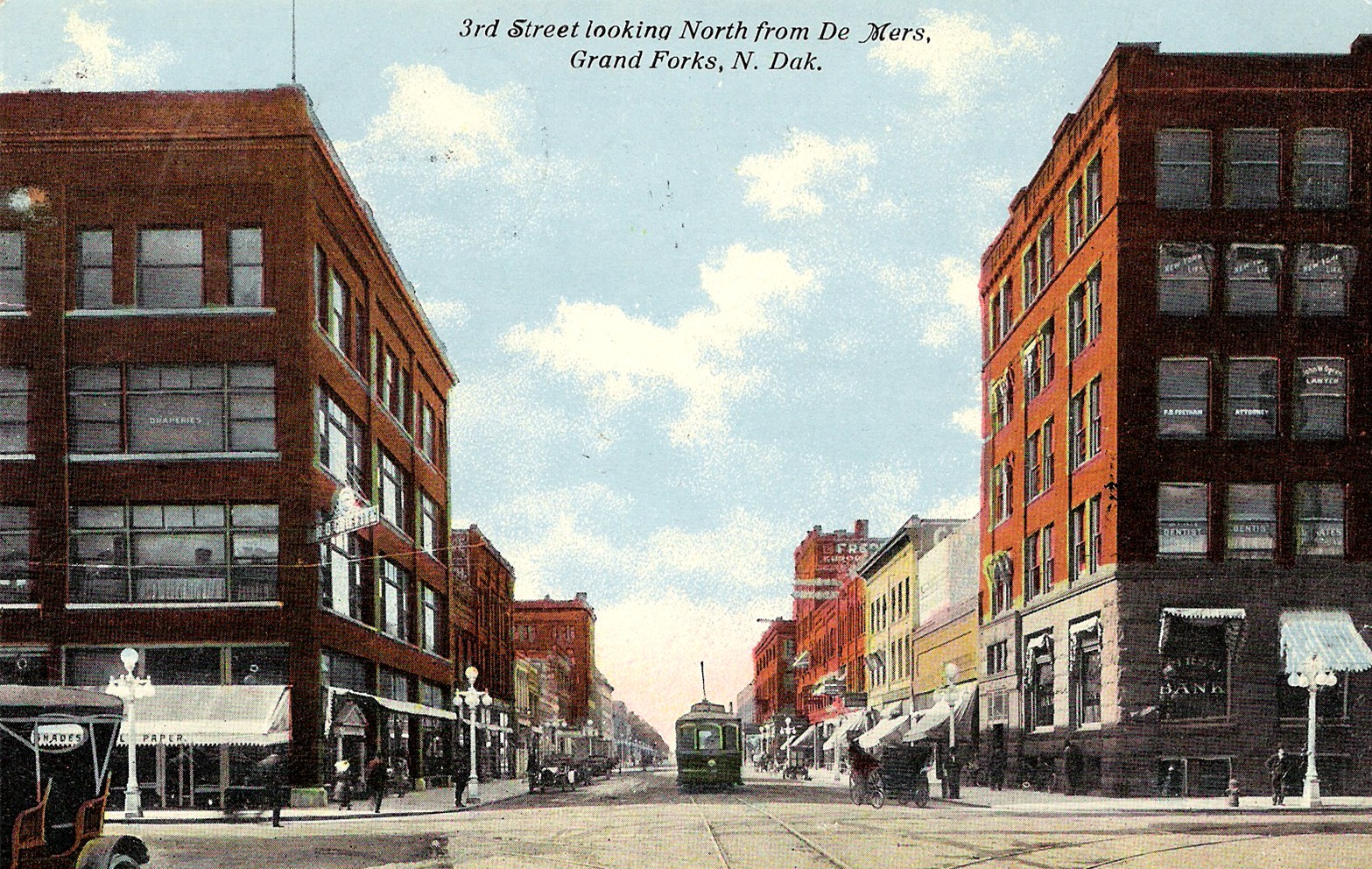
Downtown Grand Forks, circa 1912

The first half of the 20th century saw steady growth and the development of new neighborhoods farther south and west of downtown. The 1920s saw the construction of the state-owned North Dakota Mill and Elevator on the north side of the city. In 1954, Grand Forks was chosen as the site for an Air Force base. Grand Forks Air Force Base brought thousands of new jobs and residents to the community. The military base and the University of North Dakota would become the two most integral pieces of the city's economy.

The later half of the century saw an increased shift away from downtown and towards the outskirts of the community. The coming of the Interstate Highway System revolutionized the way people traveled throughout the region. Several urban renewal projects tore down sections of the downtown area to make way for public buildings and transportation improvements. New public schools, a new hospital, and many commercial centers were built during this period. The opening of the Columbia Mall on the south side of town in 1978 forever changed the retail scene in the community.

== Flood of 1997 ==
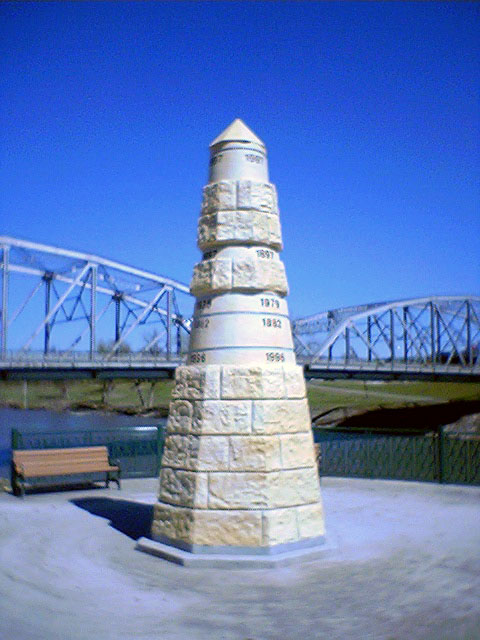
Flood memorial

The city was struck by a severe flood in 1997, causing extensive damage. With Fargo upstream from the bulk of the waters, and Winnipeg with its flood control structures, Grand Forks became the hardest hit city in the Red River Valley. During the height of the flooding, a major fire also destroyed eleven buildings in the city's downtown area. One of the buildings destroyed by fire was the office of the Grand Forks Herald, the city's daily newspaper. National media attention and a large donation from McDonald's restaurant heiress Joan Kroc helped speed the city's recovery. Several neighborhoods had to be completely demolished to make way for a massive new dike system. Completed in 2006, the flood wall protects the community from future flooding. This land bordering the Red River is known as the Greater Grand Forks Greenway, a system of parks.

== Recent history ==
Since the flood, growth and new development has taken place throughout the city. Major projects have included the Alerus Center (concert venue and home of the UND football team), the $100+ million Ralph Engelstad Arena (home of the UND hockey team) on the UND campus, and a number of new commercial projects on the outskirts of town. The city is currently experiencing steady population growth. A large number of homes, townhouses, and apartment buildings have been constructed recently. Most commercial development has taken place along the 32nd Avenue South commercial corridor and around the Ralph Engelstad Arena — an area known as University Village.

Recent issues the city is facing include the Spring 2007 opening of a $50 million Canad Inns hotel and water park complex located adjacent to the Alerus Center, the impact of a realignment at Grand Forks Air Force Base, and economic growth coupled with a low unemployment rate.

== See also ==
- National Register of Historic Places listings in Grand Forks County, North Dakota
