= Midtown District =

Coordinates: 47.902081°N 97.047933°W

- Location: Grand Forks, North Dakota, United States
- Opened: February 26, 1964
- Developer: South Forks Land Corporation
- Owner: HOPE Evangelical Covenant Church
- Num. of stores: 41
- Num. of anchor tenants: 6
- Floor area: 367,122 square feet (34,106.7 m^{2})
- Floors: 1
- Public transit: Cities Area Transit

Midtown District, formerly known as Grand Cities Mall, is an enclosed shopping mall located on South Washington Street in Grand Forks, North Dakota. With its construction in 1964, it was the first enclosed shopping mall built in North Dakota. The mall covers 367,122 sq ft (34,106.7 m^{2}). Notable junior anchor tenants include Ace Hardware, Poppler's Music, Hope Evangelical Covenant Church, and Thrive Community Church. The mall also houses numerous small and local businesses.

== History ==
The project was initiated by the South Forks Land Corporation in 1963. The architect was DeRemer, Harrie & Kennedy of Grand Forks, successor to the office of Joseph Bell DeRemer.

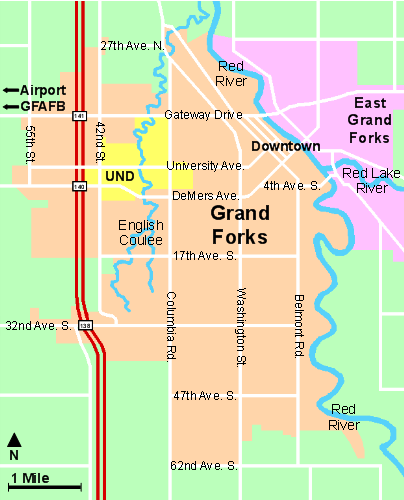
Location of Grand Cities Mall

The Grand Cities Mall, originally called South Forks Plaza, was built in several stages. One of the original anchors, Kmart, first opened February 26, 1964, before the rest of the mall, which continued to be built over the summer. Sears opened its location in the mall on October 8, 1964.

The mall was the first enclosed mall in the city of Grand Forks. However, until 1973, the mall's two wings were not accessible to each other from inside. Sears and many of the stores occupied one wing, with Kmart and the remainder of the stores in the other. In November 1973, a connecting portion of the mall was completed, allowing access between the wings. A further addition was added on the west side in 1977.

The property was acquired by J. Herzog & Sons, Inc. in 1998. The old "South Forks Plaza" name was subsequently dropped and some renovations took place. That same year, J. Herzog and Sons sold a portion of the Mall, The Pavilion, to HOPE Evangelical Covenant Church.

In 2000, Sears left the mall and moved to Columbia Mall. The empty Sears space was divided up into several smaller stores including a Zimmerman's furniture store and a Family Dollar. In 2005, Burggraf's Ace Hardware opened a store on the east side of the mall.

On April 1, 2015, the entire mall was purchased by HOPE Evangelical Covenant Church. A separate company, Land of Hope, LLC, was created to run the mall's daily operations.

On December 28, 2018, Sears Holdings announced that Kmart would be closing as part of a plan to close 80 stores nationwide. The store closed in March 2019.

On January 12, 2026, the mall entered a new chapter with a rebranding that officially changed its name from Grand Cities Mall to Midtown District.

== See also ==
- Columbia Mall
