= Flag of Grand Forks, North Dakota =

City of Grand Forks
- Proportion: 2:3
- Adopted: December 5, 1994; 31 years ago
- Design: A white field with a blue 9-sided figure at the bottom, bordered by 2 green trapezoids on either side and a green pentagon in the center. Near the middle of the flag is a wheat stalk crossed with a red feather and the words "Grand Forks, North Dakota" arched around it at the top and the year "1870" written below
- Designed by: Scott Telle and Craig Silvernagel

The flag of Grand Forks, North Dakota, was adopted on December 5, 1994.

== Design ==
The flag features green riverbanks (symbolize the life and growth of the city), blue water (symbolizes the forking of the Red River of the North and the Red Lake River at Grand Forks and the historical significance of the rivers in the development of the city), a yellow stalk of wheat (symbolizes the local importance of agriculture), a red feather (symbolizes the influence of Native Americans on the region), and a white background (symbolizes the clean air and open spaces of the area). 1870 refers to the year the name "Grand Forks" was first applied to the new community.
