= Columbia Mall (Grand Forks) =

Coordinates: 47.893136°N 97.071583°W

- Location: Grand Forks, North Dakota
- Address: 2800 S Columbia Rd.
- Opened: August 2, 1978
- Developer: Dayton Hudson Corporation
- Owner: GK Development, Inc.
- Num. of stores: 70+
- Num. of anchor tenants: 4 (1 vacant, 1 under construction)
- Floor area: 710,000 sq ft (66,000 m^{2})
- Floors: 1
- Public transit: Cities Area Transit
- Website: shopcolumbiamall.com

Columbia Mall is an enclosed regional shopping mall in Grand Forks, North Dakota located at the intersection of 32nd Avenue South and Columbia Road. The mall opened in 1978, and was developed by the Dayton Hudson Corporation (now Target Corporation) at a cost of roughly $20 million. Today, Columbia Mall features the traditional retailers JCPenney and Scheels, and also currently features several prominent specialty retailers such as Bath & Body Works, Hot Topic, Maurices (closing Fall 2026), and Men's Warehouse. GK Development, Inc. of Barrington, Illinois, is the current owner of the mall. Macy's was a former anchor store on the south side of the mall before they closed on March 26, 2017, due to company issues, along with Sears on the north side of the mall until they closed October 18, 2018 due to bankruptcy issues with the business.

It is the largest mall within 70 miles (110 km). Located 80 miles (130 km) from the Canada–US border and 140 miles (230 km) from Winnipeg, the mall draws a significant number of customers from Canada.

== History ==
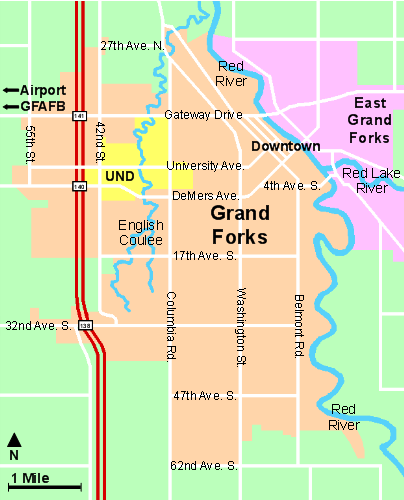
Location of Columbia Mall

=== Initial concepts ===
Dayton Hudson experienced fierce competition for a new mall in the city of Grand Forks in 1975. While their proposal was to build a mall at the intersection of 32nd Avenue South and Columbia Road, Inland Construction of Edina, Minnesota wanted to build a mall at 32nd Avenue South and Washington Street (one mile east of the Dayton Hudson site), which was quickly dismissed, while a group of local investors and Farber-Kelley Ltd. of Toronto advanced a proposal for a mall at DeMers Avenue and 42nd Street to be called "Marketplace West." While Marketplace West was initially preferred by the city planning department, a referendum was called to annex Dayton Hudson's proposed Columbia Mall site to the city. When it passed, the city council interpreted it as a public endorsement of the Columbia Mall project. The Marketplace West site later became the home of the Alerus Center arena and convention center.

=== Early tenants ===
Columbia Mall opened on August 2, 1978, with 571,800 sq ft (53,120 m^{2}) of retail space. The three initial anchors included both Dayton Hudson-owned Target and Dayton's stores as well as a JCPenney store. In 2000, a Sears department store relocated from the Grand Cities Mall to the Columbia Mall, bringing the total number of anchor tenants in the mall to four. By 2001, Target relocated to a larger space on 32nd Avenue South, becoming a SuperTarget. The Dayton's location was also changed to a Marshall Field's that year following a national merger. Marshall Field's was later purchased by May Department Stores in 2004 and merged with Federated Department Stores in 2005 and subsequently converted to Macy's.

=== Current operations ===
By 2005, GK Development added a new food court named Dakota Cafe. The American Red Cross established a temporary disaster relief operations headquarters at the shopping center in response to the August 26, 2007, tornado that struck nearby Northwood, ND. In 2014, a new Scheels All Sports was added to the mall in the former Target.

In 2017, Macy's closed. In 2018, Sears closed. Several potential replacement tenants have eyed the vacant anchor store buildings.

In 2026, a company called Midwest Ventures announced that they would be converting the former Macy's into a mixed-use facility. The City of Grand Forks approved a rezoning proposal from Midwest Ventures in partnership with Crary Real Estate and the Haugs Family, that would allow the developer to transition the old Macy's space into a commercial and storage facility. Renovation of the mixed-use facility began in 2026.

== See also ==
- West Acres Shopping Center
