= MATBUS =

Public transit system in the Fargo, North Dakota metro area

- Founded: 1870s
- Headquarters: 502 NP Avenue, Fargo, North Dakota
- Service area: Fargo–Moorhead
- Service type: Bus service, paratransit
- Routes: 19
- Fleet: 42
- Fuel type: Diesel, biodiesel
- Website: matbus.com

MATBUS (Fargo Moorhead Metro Area Transit) is a public transport bus system serving the Fargo, North Dakota and Moorhead, Minnesota Metropolitan Area.

== History ==
Public transport in Fargo–Moorhead began in the 1870s, with horse-drawn coaches. In the twentieth century, trolleys and buses were introduced. Trolley tracks can still be seen in some alley ways in Fargo. Increased automobile use and growing urban sprawl caused public transport to decline in the area. Beginning in 1971, transit was partially funded by the government.

In 1974, the Fargo-Moorhead Council of Governments began management of the area's public transit, which was subsequently named MAT. Fargo and Moorhead later took control of their portions of the transit system, but continued cooperation and coordination under the MAT brand.

== Transit Routes ==
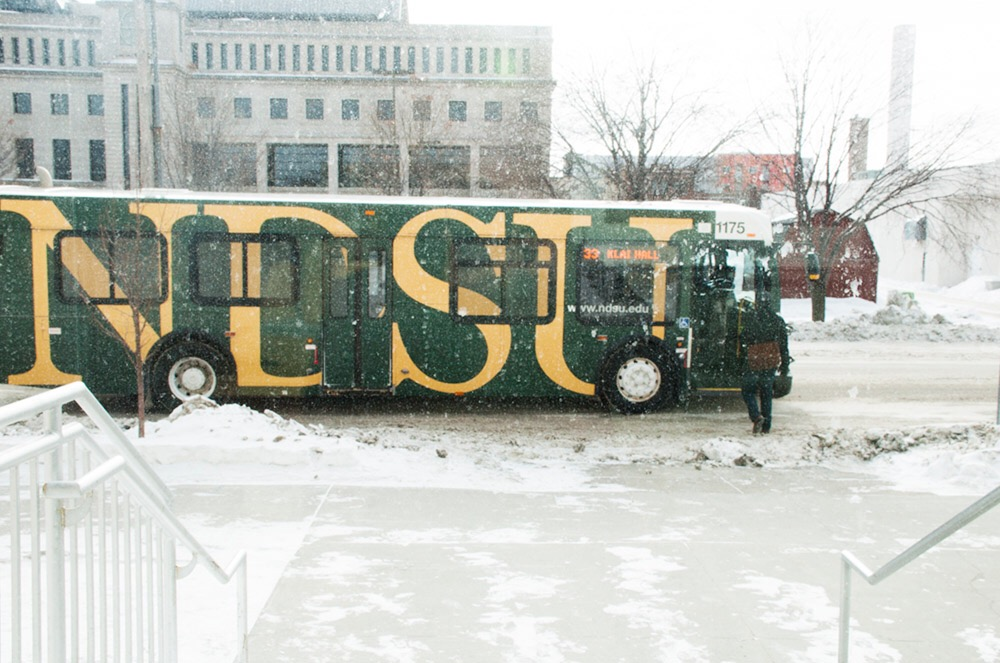
A MATBUS vehicle operating Route 33 at the NDSU downtown campus.

MATBUS operates 19 fixed routes and two on-demand routes throughout the Fargo-Moorhead metro area. Routes 1 through 9 primarily run in Moorhead and Dilworth while routes 11 through 34 primarily run in Fargo and West Fargo. During special events, MATBUS also operates a free shuttle between the Fargo and Moorhead downtown areas called LinkFM.

Six MATBUS fixed routes serve the North Dakota State University campus during the academic year through an agreement between the university and the City of Fargo. In January 2018, MATBUS replaced its late-night route on NDSU's campus with an on-demand route called TapRide. The system allows students at the university to request a ride via a smartphone app to and from any location on campus or nearby neighborhoods. In August 2019, a second TapRide route was launched to serve Fargo's industrial park area.

== Transfer Hubs ==
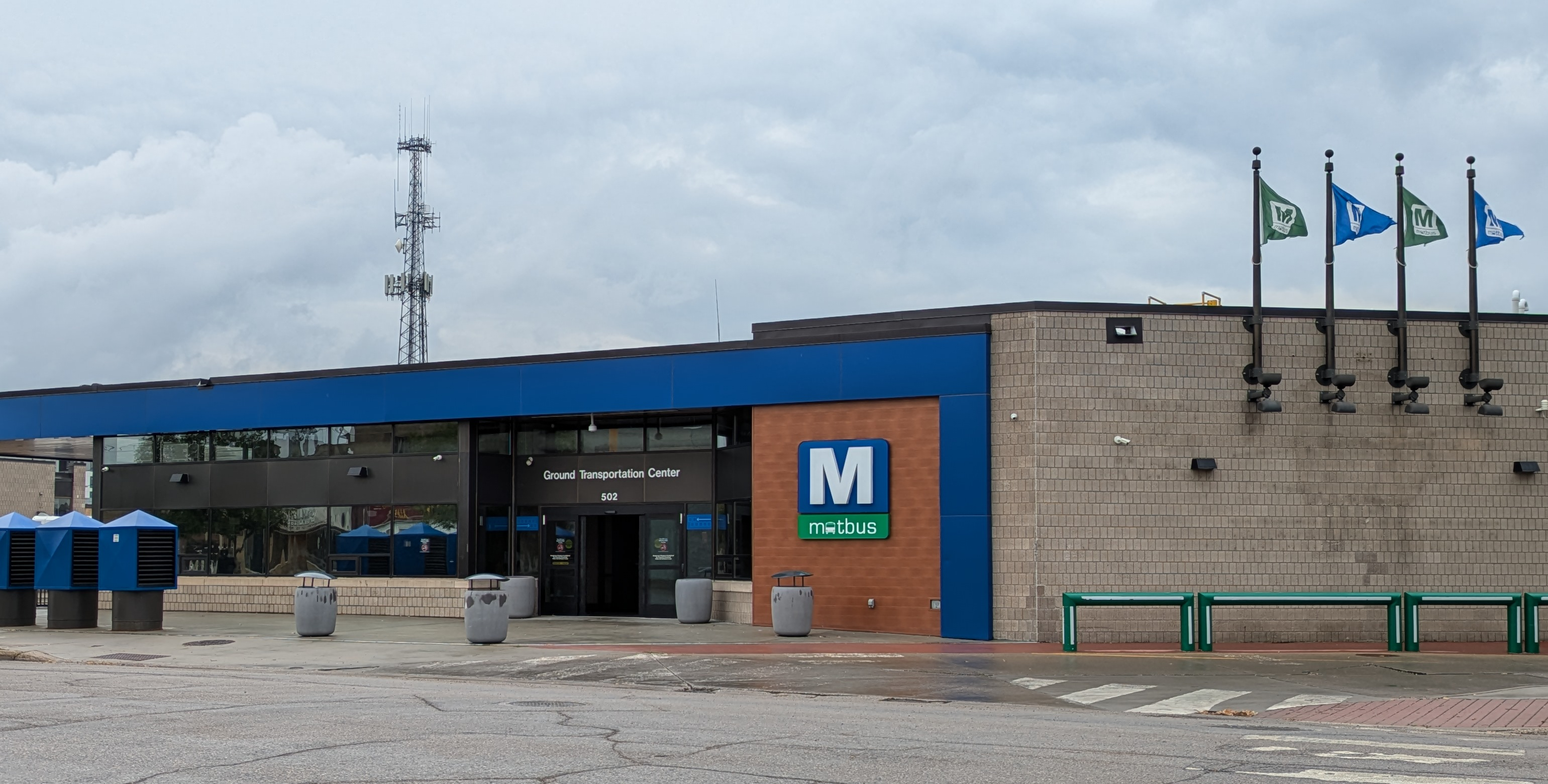
Ground Transportation Center

- The Ground Transportation Center, or GTC, is located at 502 NP Avenue in Fargo, and serves as the core of MATBUS operations. The GTC is the main transfer hub between Moorhead and Fargo routes. It offers comfortable seating, vending and restrooms. In addition to MATBUS, it also serves intercity buses operated by Jefferson Lines. The facility was built in 1984, and underwent renovations in 2004 and 2005 and again in 2020-2021. The 2021 renovations changed the layout to allow buses to pull straight through, instead of having to reverse. In addition, an office and luggage storage were added for Jefferson Lines.
- The Dilworth Walmart is located at 415 34th St North in Dilworth, on the north side of Walmart and consists of a small shelter, which serves 3 routes.
- The Marriott Transfer Hub is located on 11th Street South in Moorhead, just east of the Marriott Hotel. It features a large shelter with indoor and outdoor seating.
- The NDSU Transit Hub is a standalone shelter located just off University Drive by the A. Glenn Hill Center at NDSU. It is both heated and cooled, and it features seating, system maps, and digital arrivals screens.
- The West Acres Shopping Center transfer hub is located at the Roger Maris Museum entrance. It is fully enclosed and features indoor and outdoor seating, and system maps.

== Ridership ==
MATBUS ridership totaled 1,867,498 system-wide in 2017, down from 1,931,970 in 2016 (a 3.34% decrease). Ridership on MATBUS has seen significant gains since 1998 when fixed route ridership was 793,228. MATBUS experienced its highest use in 2014 when the total fixed route ridership reached 2,223,701.

Significant ridership on MATBUS comes from area colleges due in part to the system's U-Pass program. Through the program, students at NDSU, MSUM, Concordia, M State, and NDSCS can ride any fixed route in the system for free by using their student ID. In 2017, college ridership accounted for 407,485 rides on MATBUS. Of those 407,485 rides, the majority (346,258) were taken by riders from NDSU. Fixed routes near the NDSU campus are some of the most-used routes in the MATBUS system.

Ridership on MATBUS paratransit routes in 2017 was 10,907, up from 10,765 in 2016.

The ridership and service statistics shown below are of fixed route services only and do not include demand response. Per capita statistics are based on the Fargo urbanized area as reported in NTD data. Starting in 2011, 2010 census numbers replace the 2000 census numbers to calculate per capita statistics.

	Ridership	Change	Ridership per capita
2002	491,484	n/a	3.45
2003	412,797	▼16.01%	2.9
2004	613,024	▲48.5%	4.3
2005	832,837	▲35.86%	5.85
2006	881,734	▲5.87%	6.19
2007	971,217	▲10.15%	6.82
2008	1,214,805	▲25.08%	8.53
2009	1,376,136	▲13.28%	9.66
2010	1,621,133	▲17.8%	11.38
2011	1,665,221	▲2.72%	9.43
2012	1,604,693	▼3.63%	9.08
2013	1,682,267	▲4.83%	9.52
2014	1,741,524	▲3.52%	9.86
2015	1,627,916	▼6.52%	9.21
2016	1,486,051	▼8.71%	8.41
2017	1,421,294	▼4.36%	8.04
2018	1,439,017	▲1.25%	8.14
2019	1,343,534	▼6.64%	7.6
2020	848,312	▼36.86%	4.8
2021	786,147	▼7.33%	4.5

== See also ==
- List of bus transit systems in the United States
- Fargo station
- Bis-Man Transit
- Cities Area Transit
