= Grand Forks, North Dakota =

- City
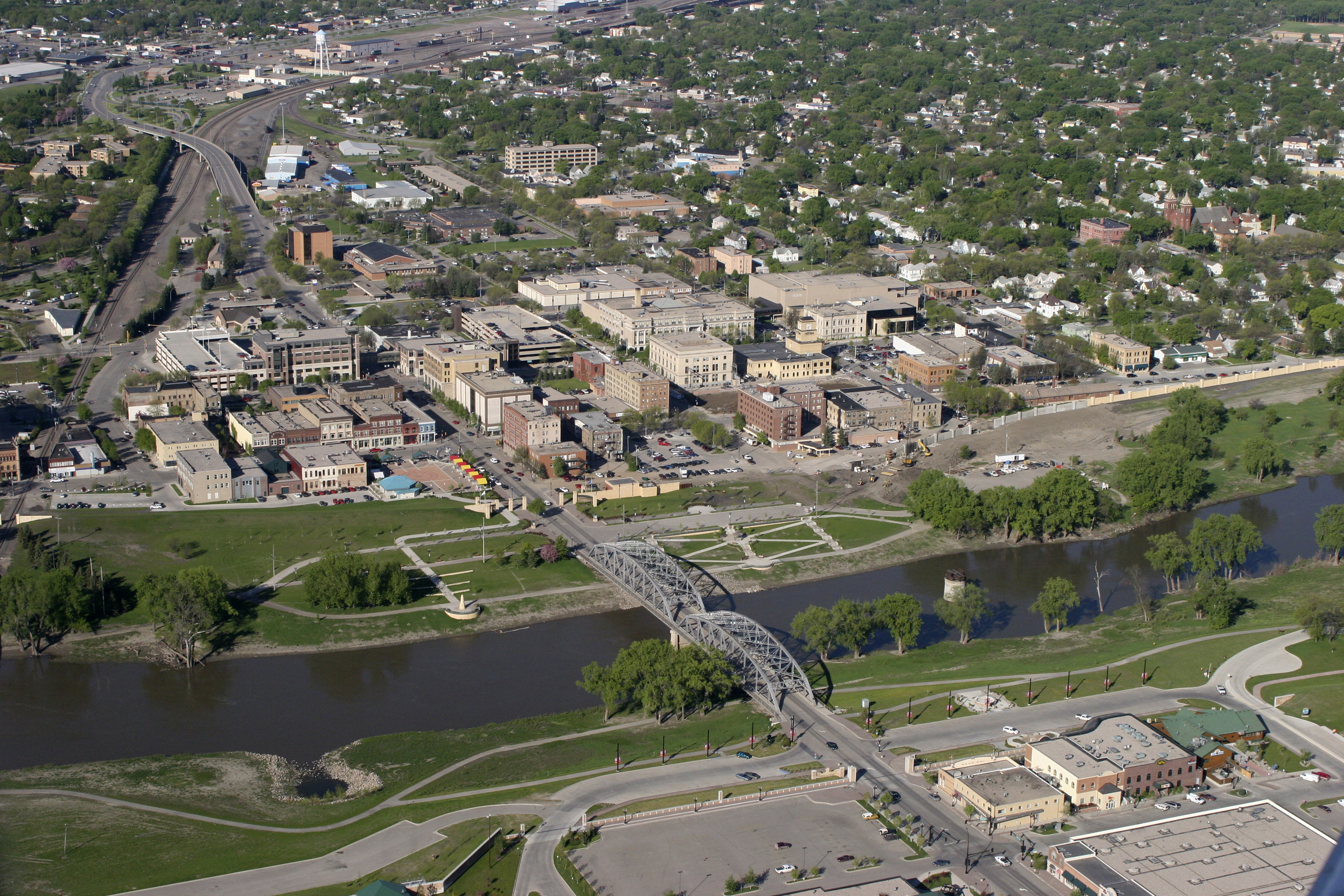
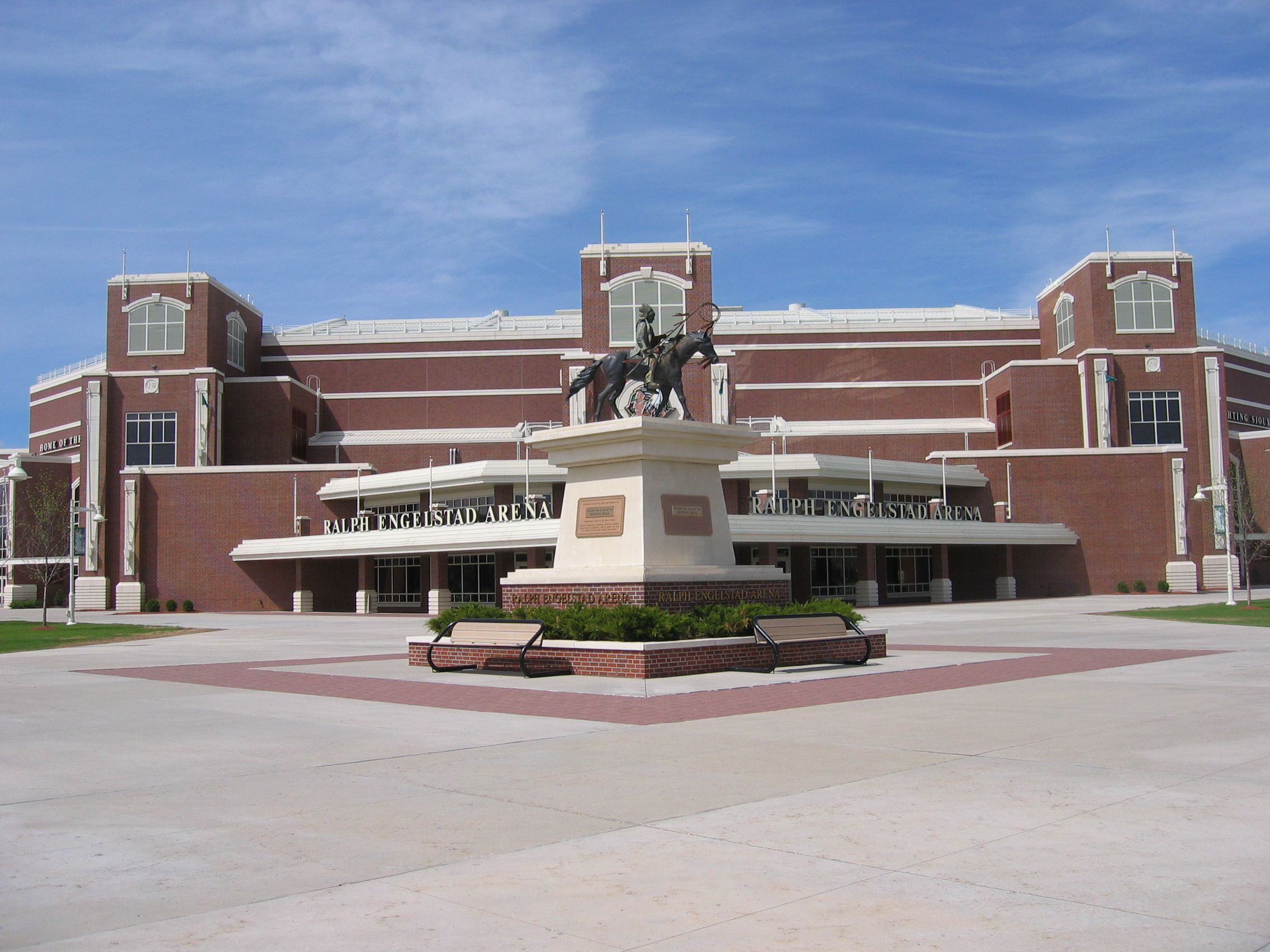
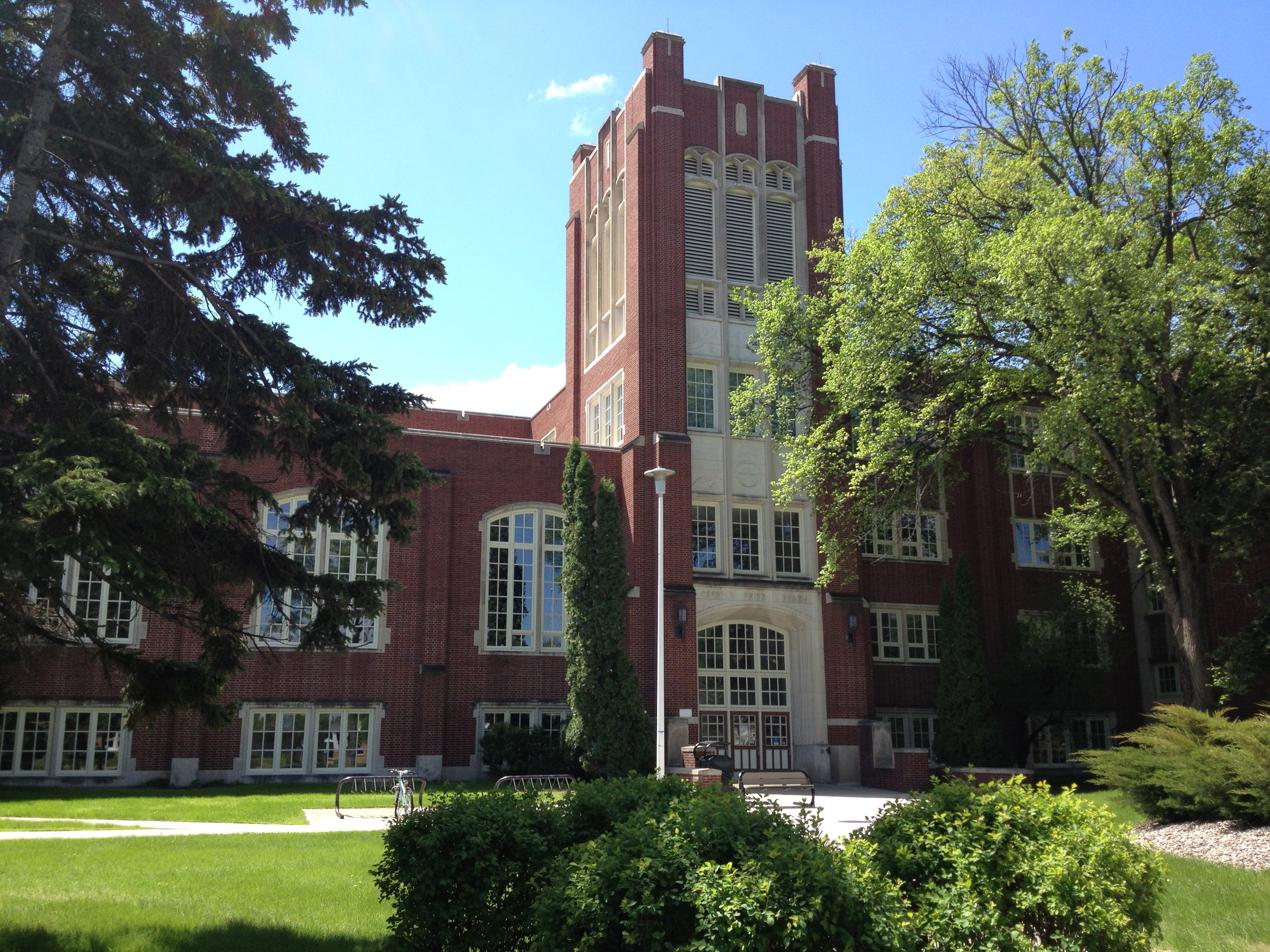
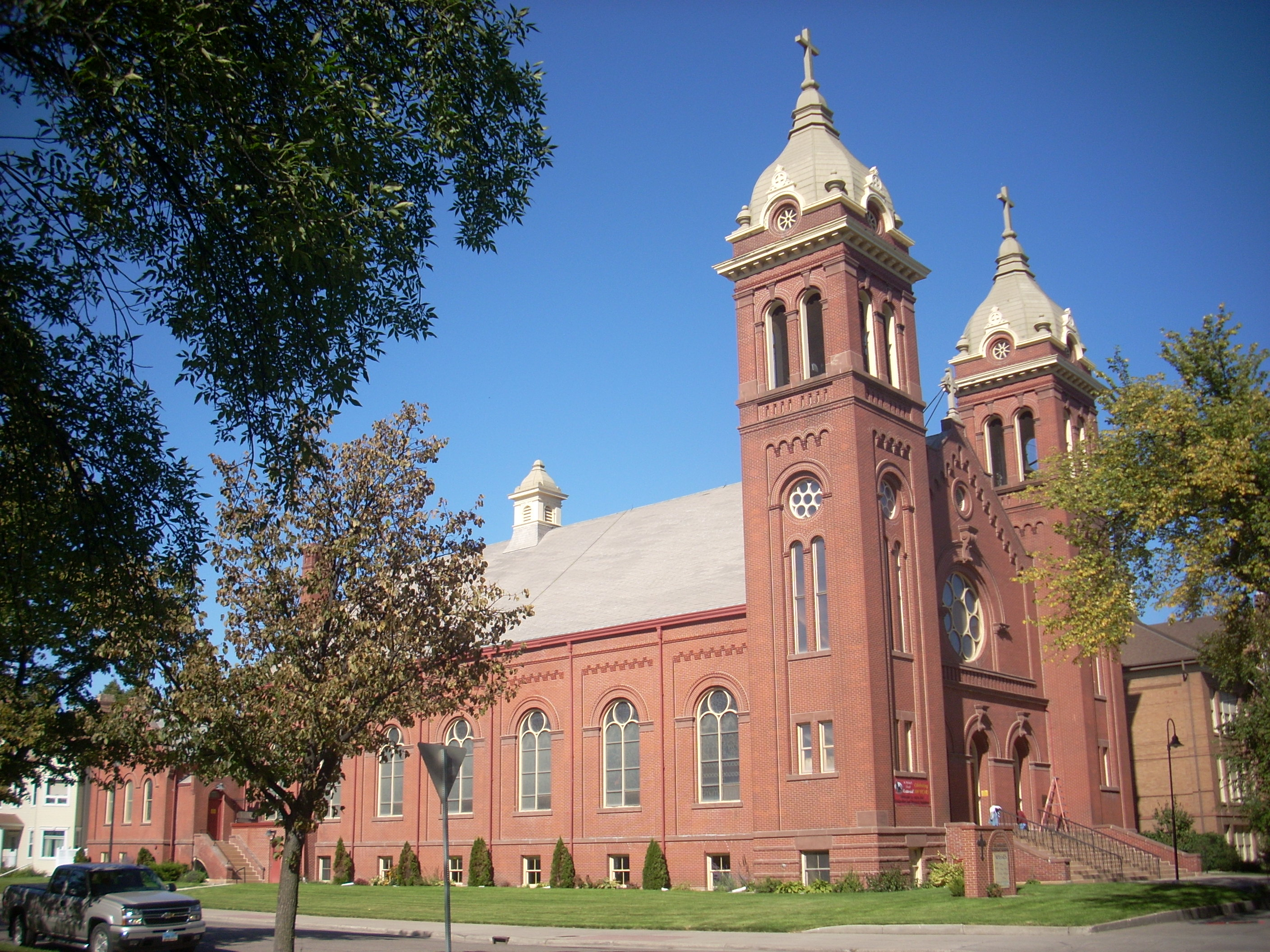
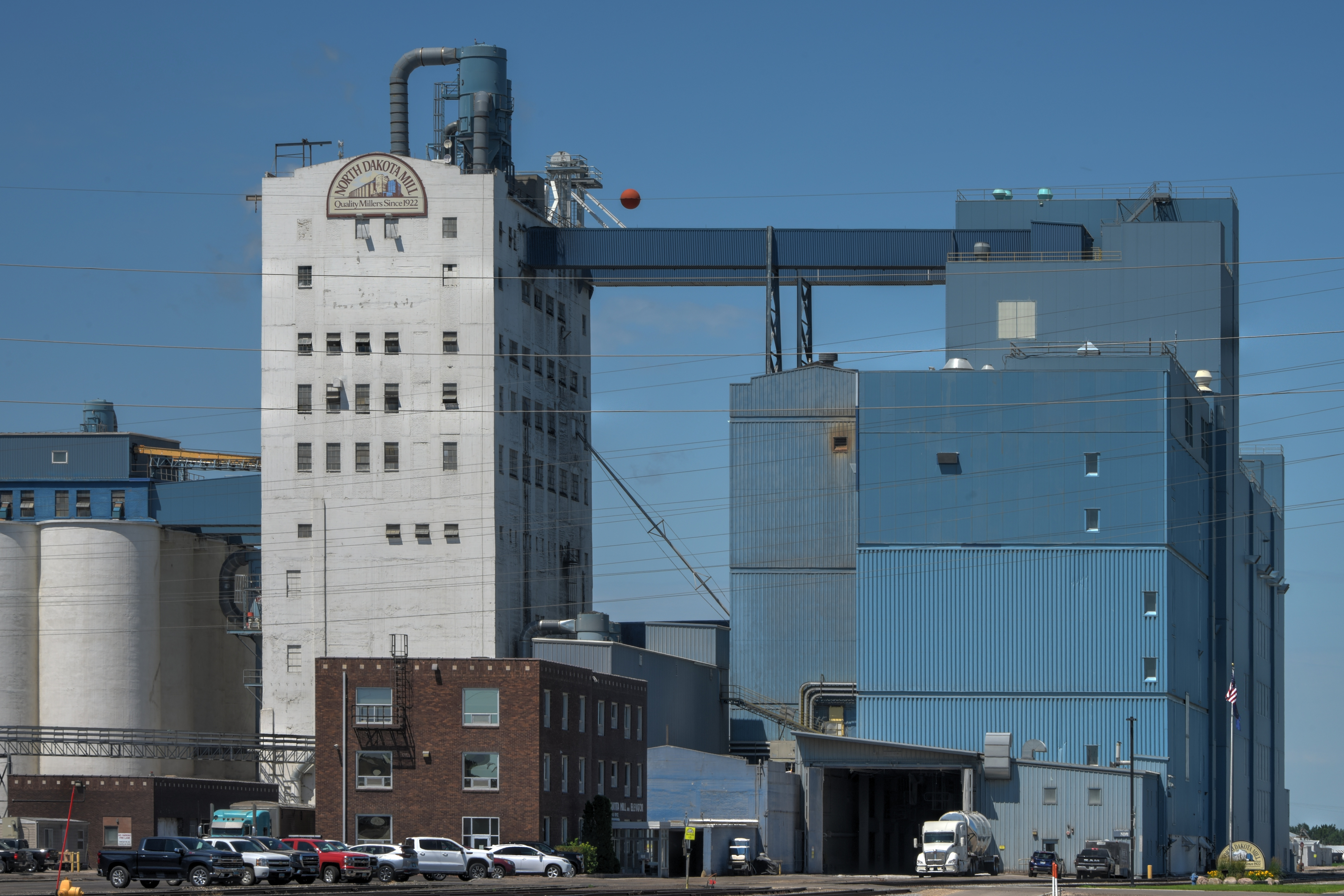
- Aerial view of Downtown Grand Forks (2006) Ralph Engelstad Arena Chester Fritz Library St. Michael's Church North Dakota Mill and Elevator

- Flag Logo
- Nicknames: "The Grand Cities", "The Forks"
- Motto: "A Place of Excellence"
- Interactive map of Grand Forks, North Dakota
- Location within North Dakota Location within the United States
- Coordinates: 47.919595°N 97.087328°W
- Country: United States
- State: North Dakota
- Metro: Greater Grand Forks
- County: Grand Forks
- Founded: June 15, 1870
- Incorporated: February 22, 1881

Government
  - Type: Council–manager
  - Mayor: Brandon Bochenski
  - Administrator: Todd Feland
  - Vice president: Danny Weigel
  - Councilmembers: Rebecca Osowski; Tricia Berg; Tricia Lunski; Mike Fridolfs; Dana Sande; Ken Vein

Area
  - City: 29.318 sq mi (75.933 km^{2})
  - Land: 29.121 sq mi (75.422 km^{2})
  - Water: 0.198 sq mi (0.514 km^{2}) 0.68%
  - Urban: 26.48 sq mi (68.59 km^{2})
  - Metro: 3,407 sq mi (8,825 km^{2})
- Elevation: 837 ft (255 m)

Population (2020)
  - City: 59,166
  - Estimate (2024): 59,845
  - Rank: US: 674th ND: 3rd
  - Density: 2,055.2/sq mi (793.51/km^{2})
  - Urban: 68,160 (US: 411th)
  - Urban density: 2,574/sq mi (993.7/km^{2})
  - Metro: 104,184 (US: 356th)
  - Metro density: 30.6/sq mi (11.81/km^{2})
- Demonym: Grand Forks resident or Grand Forks native
- Time zone: UTC−6 (Central (CST))
  - Summer (DST): UTC−5 (CDT)
- ZIP Codes: 58201, 58202, 58203, 58204, 58205, 58206, 58207, 58208
- Area code: 701
- FIPS code: 38-32060
- GNIS feature ID: 1036064
- Highways: I-29, US 2, US 81, ND 297
- Sales tax: 7.25%
- Website: grandforksgov.com

Grand Forks is a city in and the county seat of Grand Forks County, North Dakota, United States. The population was 59,166 at the 2020 census, and was estimated to be 59,845 in 2024, making it the state's third-most populous city, after Fargo and Bismarck. Grand Forks, along with its twin city of East Grand Forks, Minnesota, forms the center of the Grand Forks metropolitan statistical area, which is often called Greater Grand Forks or the Grand Cities.

Located on the western banks of the north-flowing Red River of the North, in a flat region known as the Red River Valley, the city is prone to flooding. The 1997 Red River flood devastated the city. Originally called Les Grandes Fourches by fur traders from Canada, who had long worked and lived in the region, the community was platted by steamboat captain Alexander Griggs after he was forced to winter there. The post office was established in 1870, and the town was incorporated on February 22, 1881. The city was named for its location at the fork of the Red River and the Red Lake River.

Initially dependent on local agriculture, the city's economy has since broadened to include a wide variety of industries, including higher education, defense, health care, manufacturing, food processing, and scientific research. Grand Forks is served by Grand Forks International Airport and Grand Forks Air Force Base. The city's University of North Dakota is the oldest institution of higher education in the state. The Alerus Center and Ralph Engelstad Arena host athletic and other events, while the Empire Arts Center and Chester Fritz Auditorium are the city's largest cultural venues.

== History ==
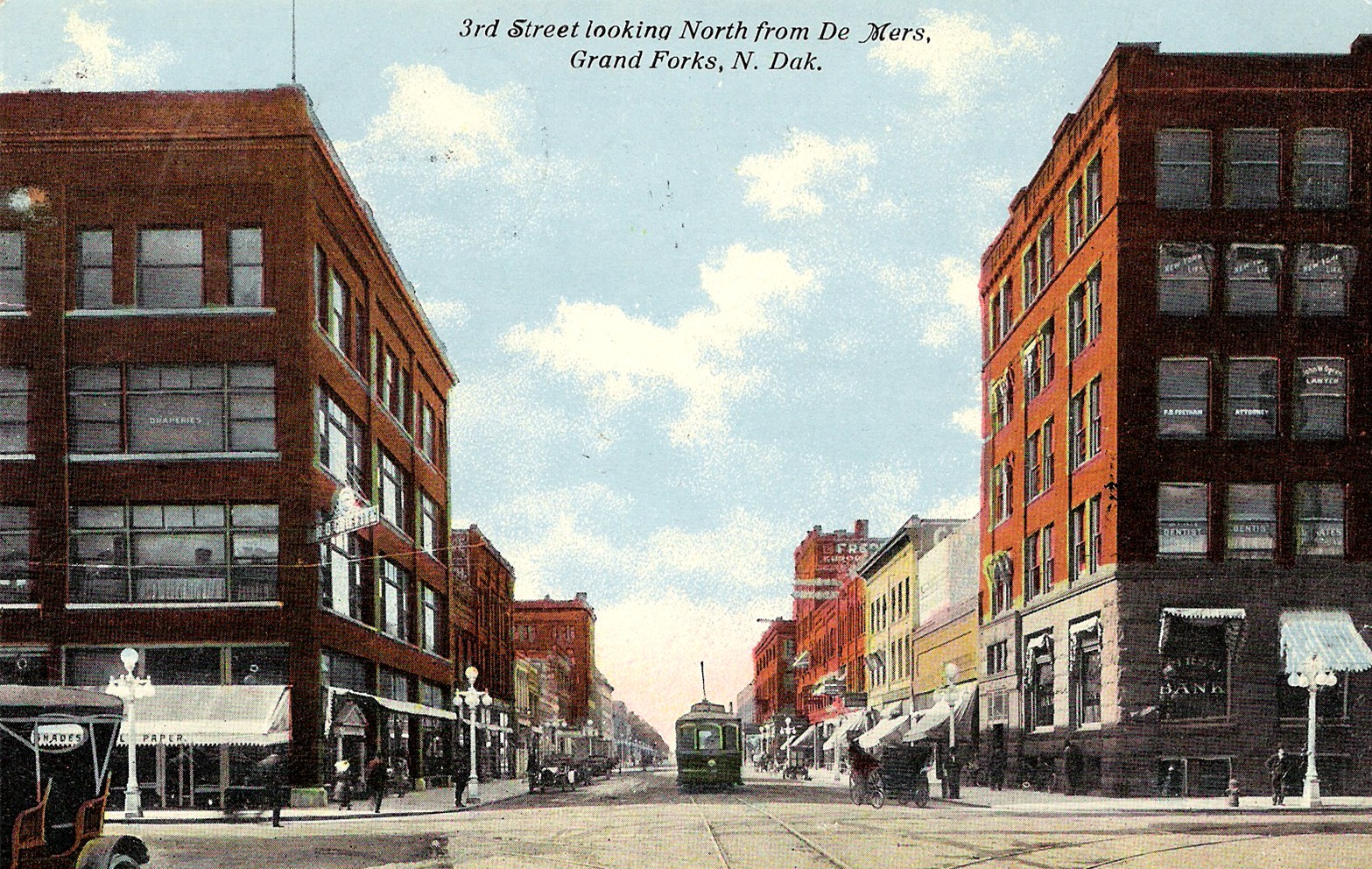
Downtown Grand Forks, c. 1912

Before Europeans arrived, the area where the city developed, at the forks of the Red River and Red Lake River, had been an important meeting and trading point for Native Americans for thousands of years. Early French explorers, fur trappers, and traders called the area Les Grandes Fourches, meaning "The Grand Forks". By the 1740s, French fur trappers relied on Les Grandes Fourches as an important trading post. This was French colonial territory.

The United States acquired the territory from British Rupert's Land with the Treaty of 1818, but indigenous tribes dominated the area until the late 19th century. After years of warfare, the United States made treaties to extinguish the land claims of the Ojibwe and other Native American peoples. When a U.S. post office was established on the site on June 15, 1870, the name was changed to the English "Grand Forks". Alexander Griggs, a steamboat captain, is regarded as "The Father of Grand Forks". His steamboat froze in the Red River on a voyage in late 1870, forcing him and his crew to spend the winter camping at Grand Forks. Griggs platted a community in 1875, and Grand Forks was officially incorporated on February 22, 1881.

Thousands of settlers were attracted to the Dakota Territory in the 1870s and 1880s for its cheap land, and the population began to rise. Many established small family farms, but some investors bought thousands of acres for bonanza farms, where they supervised the cultivation and harvesting of wheat as a commodity crop. The city grew quickly after the arrival of the Great Northern Railway in 1880 and the Northern Pacific Railway in 1887. In 1883, the University of North Dakota was established, six years before North Dakota was admitted as an independent state. Grand Forks was the site of one of the deadliest tornadoes in North Dakota history in 1887. The storm killed at least six people.

During the first half of the 20th century, new residential neighborhoods were developed south and west of downtown Grand Forks. In the 1920s, the state-owned North Dakota Mill and Elevator was constructed on the city's north side.

In 1954, Grand Forks was chosen as the site for an Air Force base. Grand Forks Air Force Base brought thousands of new jobs and residents to the community. The military base and the University of North Dakota became integral to the city's economy. With construction of federal highways, during the postwar years residential and business development became suburbanized, spreading to new areas as land was available. Interstate 29 was built on the western side of the city, and two enclosed shopping malls—South Forks Plaza and Columbia Mall—were built on the south side.

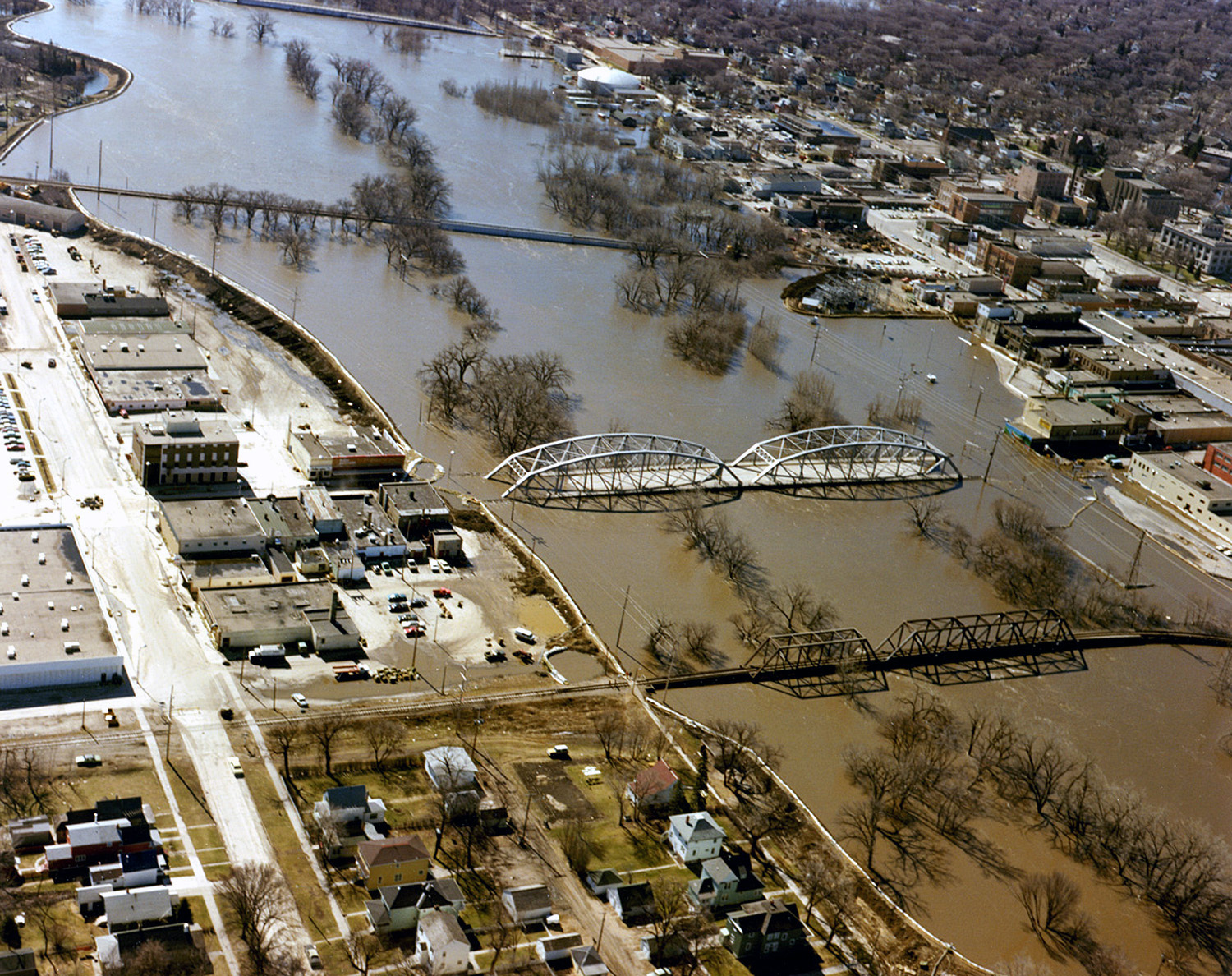
The Red River in flood in April 1997

The Red River had a history of seasonal flooding, aggravated by the broad ancient lake bed that formed the Red River Valley. The 1997 Red River flood caused extensive damage in the city. Fargo was upstream from the bulk of the flood waters that season, and Winnipeg had built an extensive system of flood control structures in the 1960s. In 1997, Grand Forks suffered the most damage of any major city in the Red River Valley. During the height of the flooding, a major fire destroyed 11 buildings in the downtown area. The government began developing a new levee system to protect the city, which was completed 10 years later. It required the relocation of numerous residents, as some neighborhoods were emptied for this construction.

The floodplain bordering the Red River was later converted into a large park known as the Greater Grand Forks Greenway. This provided new recreation space for city residents on both sides of the river, as well as space for future floodwaters to be absorbed naturally by trees and other plants, without damage to infrastructure.

New public and private developments have continued to expand Grand Forks's footprint since the 1997 flood. Two new, large sports venues opened in 2001: the Alerus Center and the Ralph Engelstad Arena. Six years later, the Winnipeg-based Canad Inns hotel chain added a 13-story hotel and waterpark connected to the Alerus Center. Grand Forks also surpassed pre-flood level population, area employment, and taxable sales in 2007.

== Geography ==
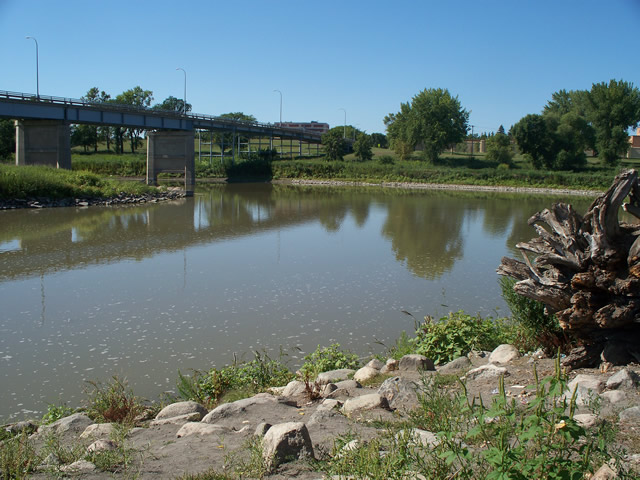
The confluence of the Red and Red Lake Rivers

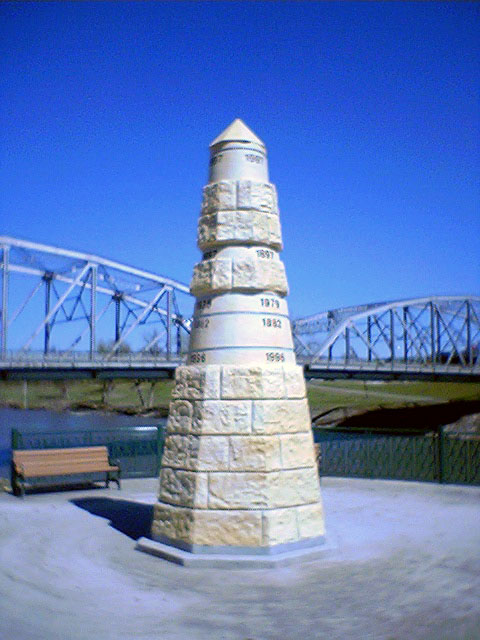
Flood memorial

Grand Forks is 74 miles (119 km) north of the Fargo–Moorhead area and 145 miles (233 km) south of Winnipeg, Manitoba, Canada. Grand Forks is on the western bank of the Red River of the North in an area known as the Red River Valley. The term "forks" refers to the forking of the Red River with the Red Lake River near downtown Grand Forks. According to the United States Census Bureau, the city has an area of 29.318 square miles (75.93 km^{2}), of which 29.120 square miles (75.42 km^{2}) is land and 0.198 square miles (0.51 km^{2}) is water. Since it is in one of the flattest parts of the world, the city has few differences in elevation. There are no lakes within the city limits of Grand Forks, but the meandering Red River and the English Coulee flow through the community and provide some break in the terrain.

The Red River Valley is the result of an ancient glacier carving its way south during the last ice age. Once the glacier receded, it formed a glacial lake called Lake Agassiz. The valley is formed from the ancient lake bed. The ancient beaches can still be seen as rolling hills west of the city.

=== Cityscape ===
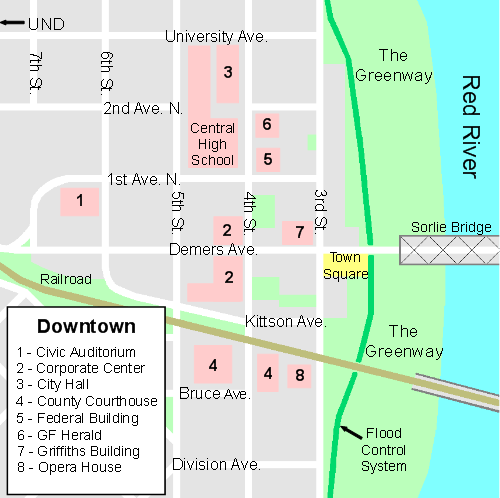
Map of downtown Grand Forks

Grand Forks has several distinct neighborhoods. The area adjacent to the Red River developed first; this is where some of the oldest neighborhoods, including the downtown area, can be found. The area between downtown and the University of North Dakota campus was another early growth area, and historic properties are also found there.

Downtown Grand Forks contains many recognized historic buildings. It is the governmental center of the city and county. It is also a gathering place for community events and festivals. A farmer's market takes place every Saturday from mid-June to mid-September in the Town Square at the corner of 3rd Street S. and DeMers Avenue.

In 2006, city leaders and developers announced plans to convert older office buildings into high-end condos and apartments, and to construct new buildings for the same purpose to provide for residents downtown. Directly south of downtown, the streets of the Near Southside Historic District are lined with classic houses. Reeves Drive was once one of the city's most fashionable neighborhoods. It has many historic mansions in various architectural styles. This neighborhood has areas of original granitoid paving, several historic churches, and Lincoln Drive Park. The Near Southside neighborhood has been designated a "national historic district" and is listed on the National Register of Historic Places.

The newer neighborhoods of Grand Forks developed in the city's southern and western parts. The 32nd Avenue South corridor has been the commercial center of the city since 1978, when the Columbia Mall opened. Many big box stores and restaurants are now along the avenue. A large strip mall, the Grand Forks Marketplace, opened in 2001 near the Columbia Mall.

University Village is a new commercial district built on vacant lands owned by the University of North Dakota. The centerpiece of the Village is the Ralph Engelstad Arena, used by the university's North Dakota men's ice hockey team. All the buildings in the village are built in a style similar style to those on the UND campus. Restaurants and retail stores, as well as the university bookstore, were developed in the area to stimulate community life. In 2006, the university opened a new wellness center for its students on the village's west side.

=== Climate ===
Due to its location in the Great Plains and its distance from both mountains and oceans, Grand Forks has a warm-summer humid continental climate (Köppen: Dfb), USDA Plant Hardiness Zone 4a. It has four very distinct seasons and great variation in temperatures over very short periods of time. Its location in the flat Red River Valley makes the city susceptible to spring flooding from the Red River of the North, and year-round windy conditions.

As there are no nearby mountain ranges or bodies of water to ameliorate the climatic conditions, Grand Forks lies exposed to numerous weather systems, including bitterly cold Arctic high pressure systems. The city has long, very cold, and snowy winters. Summers are often warm to hot and often quite humid with frequent thunderstorms. Although warm weather normally ends soon after Labor Day, a few warm days sometimes occur as late as October. Spring and autumn are short and highly variable seasons. Record temperature extremes range from −43 °F (−42 °C) on January 11, 1912, to 109 °F (43 °C) on July 12, 1936.

The daily mean temperatures of the Grand Forks winters are associated with subarctic climates with frequent subzero temperatures. Due to the extended warm period of daily means above 50 °F (10 °C) from May to September, the city's climate is still classified within the warm-summer humid continental temperature range. Although its summers are warm, Grand Forks has experienced subfreezing temperatures in all 12 months.

Climate data for Grand Forks International Airport, North Dakota (1991–2020 normals, extremes 1893–present)
Month	Jan	Feb	Mar	Apr	May	Jun	Jul	Aug	Sep	Oct	Nov	Dec	Year
Record high °F (°C)	52 (11)	67 (19)	83 (28)	100 (38)	105 (41)	105 (41)	109 (43)	104 (40)	103 (39)	95 (35)	75 (24)	58 (14)	109 (43)
Mean maximum °F (°C)	39.1 (3.9)	40.3 (4.6)	54.2 (12.3)	75.6 (24.2)	86.6 (30.3)	91.2 (32.9)	91.5 (33.1)	92.2 (33.4)	89.4 (31.9)	77.4 (25.2)	57.1 (13.9)	40.3 (4.6)	95.1 (35.1)
Mean daily maximum °F (°C)	15.8 (−9.0)	20.5 (−6.4)	33.9 (1.1)	52.0 (11.1)	66.9 (19.4)	76.4 (24.7)	80.7 (27.1)	79.8 (26.6)	70.4 (21.3)	53.9 (12.2)	35.7 (2.1)	21.4 (−5.9)	50.6 (10.3)
Daily mean °F (°C)	6.3 (−14.3)	10.6 (−11.9)	24.4 (−4.2)	40.7 (4.8)	54.1 (12.3)	64.6 (18.1)	68.9 (20.5)	67.0 (19.4)	57.9 (14.4)	43.2 (6.2)	26.7 (−2.9)	12.8 (−10.7)	39.8 (4.3)
Mean daily minimum °F (°C)	−3.1 (−19.5)	0.7 (−17.4)	15.0 (−9.4)	29.3 (−1.5)	41.4 (5.2)	52.9 (11.6)	57.0 (13.9)	54.3 (12.4)	45.3 (7.4)	32.5 (0.3)	17.8 (−7.9)	4.2 (−15.4)	28.9 (−1.7)
Mean minimum °F (°C)	−26.1 (−32.3)	−21.6 (−29.8)	−10.3 (−23.5)	14.0 (−10.0)	27.0 (−2.8)	40.9 (4.9)	46.3 (7.9)	42.9 (6.1)	31.0 (−0.6)	17.3 (−8.2)	−1.5 (−18.6)	−18.1 (−27.8)	−28.9 (−33.8)
Record low °F (°C)	−43 (−42)	−42 (−41)	−36 (−38)	−9 (−23)	5 (−15)	28 (−2)	30 (−1)	30 (−1)	11 (−12)	−9 (−23)	−35 (−37)	−37 (−38)	−43 (−42)
Average precipitation inches (mm)	0.49 (12)	0.51 (13)	0.91 (23)	1.21 (31)	2.80 (71)	3.77 (96)	3.52 (89)	2.81 (71)	2.26 (57)	1.88 (48)	0.92 (23)	0.66 (17)	21.74 (552)
Average snowfall inches (cm)	9.9 (25)	7.1 (18)	7.4 (19)	3.5 (8.9)	0.0 (0.0)	0.0 (0.0)	0.0 (0.0)	0.0 (0.0)	0.0 (0.0)	1.6 (4.1)	6.6 (17)	12.3 (31)	48.4 (123)
Average extreme snow depth inches (cm)	11.3 (29)	11.6 (29)	10.9 (28)	2.7 (6.9)	0.0 (0.0)	0.0 (0.0)	0.0 (0.0)	0.0 (0.0)	0.0 (0.0)	0.6 (1.5)	3.7 (9.4)	8.3 (21)	15.1 (38)
Average precipitation days (≥ 0.01 in)	8.4	6.8	7.3	7.7	10.7	12.1	10.2	8.8	8.6	8.4	7.0	8.8	104.8
Average snowy days (≥ 0.1 in)	10.2	7.7	5.8	2.3	0.2	0.0	0.0	0.0	0.0	1.3	5.7	10.2	43.4
Source: NOAA

== Demographics ==
Historical population
Census	Pop.	Note	%±
1880	1,705		—
1890	4,979		192.0%
1900	7,682		54.3%
1910	12,478		62.4%
1920	14,010		12.3%
1930	17,112		22.1%
1940	20,228		18.2%
1950	26,836		32.7%
1960	34,451		28.4%
1970	39,008		13.2%
1980	43,765		12.2%
1990	49,425		12.9%
2000	49,321		−0.2%
2010	52,838		7.1%
2020	59,166		12.0%
2024 (est.)	59,845		1.1%
U.S. Decennial Census; 2020 Census

=== Racial and ethnic composition ===
Grand Forks, North Dakota – racial and ethnic composition Note: the US Census treats Hispanic/Latino as an ethnic category. This table excludes Latinos from the racial categories and assigns them to a separate category. Hispanics/Latinos may be of any race.
Race / ethnicity (NH = non-Hispanic)	Pop. 1990	Pop. 2000	Pop. 2010	Pop. 2020	% 1990	% 2000	% 2010	% 2020
White alone (NH)	46,856	45,534	46,525	46,635	94.80%	92.32%	88.05%	78.82%
Black or African American alone (NH)	369	412	1,037	2,782	0.75%	0.84%	1.96%	4.70%
Native American or Alaska Native alone (NH)	1,074	1,314	1,458	1,528	2.17%	2.66%	2.76%	2.58%
Asian alone (NH)	518	471	1,169	2,356	1.05%	0.95%	2.21%	3.98%
Pacific Islander alone (NH)	—	28	19	31	—	0.06%	0.04%	0.05%
Other race alone (NH)	22	28	26	148	0.04%	0.06%	0.05%	0.25%
Mixed race or multiracial (NH)	—	613	1,131	2,733	—	1.24%	2.14%	4.62%
Hispanic or Latino (any race)	586	921	1,473	2,953	1.19%	1.87%	2.79%	4.99%
Total	49,425	49,321	52,838	59,166	100.00%	100.00%	100.00%	100.00%

=== American Community Survey ===
As of the 2023 American Community Survey, there are 25,894 estimated households in Grand Forks with an average of 2.11 persons per household. The city has a median household income of $63,838. About 16.3% of the city's population lives at or below the poverty line. Grand Forks has an estimated 69.9% employment rate, with 39.2% of the population holding a bachelor's degree or higher and 95.7% holding a high school diploma.

The top five reported ancestries (people were allowed to report up to two ancestries, thus the figures will generally add to more than 100%) were English (91.4%), Spanish (1.9%), Indo-European (2.9%), Asian and Pacific Islander (1.8%), and Other (2.1%).

=== 2020 census ===
As of the 2020 census, Grand Forks had a population of 59,166, 25,446 households, and 12,305 families.

The median age was 30.2 years. 19.5% of residents were under the age of 18 and 12.9% of residents were 65 years of age or older. For every 100 females there were 104.2 males, and for every 100 females age 18 and over there were 103.6 males age 18 and over.

99.9% of residents lived in urban areas, while 0.1% lived in rural areas.

Of the 25,446 households, 23.5% had children under the age of 18 living in them. Of all households, 35.1% were married-couple households, 27.9% were households with a male householder and no spouse or partner present, and 28.5% were households with a female householder and no spouse or partner present. About 38.4% of all households were made up of individuals and 9.6% had someone living alone who was 65 years of age or older.

There were 27,718 housing units, of which 8.2% were vacant. The homeowner vacancy rate was 1.6% and the rental vacancy rate was 9.0%. The population density was 2,121.6 inhabitants per square mile (819.2/km^{2}), and housing units averaged 993.9 inhabitants per square mile (383.7/km^{2}).

Racial composition as of the 2020 census
Race	Number	Percent
White	47,703	80.6%
Black or African American	2,822	4.8%
American Indian and Alaska Native	1,681	2.8%
Asian	2,370	4.0%
Native Hawaiian and Other Pacific Islander	32	0.1%
Some other race	841	1.4%
Two or more races	3,717	6.3%
Hispanic or Latino (of any race)	2,953	5.0%

=== 2010 census ===
As of the 2010 census, there were 52,838 people, 22,260 households, and 11,275 families residing in the city. The population density was 2,654.6 inhabitants per square mile (1,024.9/km^{2}). There were 23,449 housing units at an average density of 1,177.7 inhabitants per square mile (454.7/km^{2}). The racial makeup of the city was 89.67% White, 2.01% African American, 2.87% Native American, 2.23% Asian (0.72% Bhutanese, 0.67% Chinese, 0.40% Indian, 0.36% Filipino), 0.04% Pacific Islander, 0.73% from some other races and 2.45% from two or more races. Hispanic or Latino people of any race were 2.79% of the population.

There were 22,260 households, of which 24.3% had children under the age of 18 living with them, 37.3% were married couples living together, 9.7% had a female householder with no husband present, 3.7% had a male householder with no wife present, and 49.3% were non-families. 34.8% of all households were made up of individuals, and 8.6% had someone living alone who was 65 years of age or older. The average household size was 2.21 and the average family size was 2.87.

The median age in the city was 28.4 years. 18.4% of residents were under the age of 18; 24.6% were between the ages of 18 and 24; 25.1% were from 25 to 44; 21.7% were from 45 to 64; and 10.1% were 65 years of age or older. The gender makeup of the city was 51.2% male and 48.8% female.

=== 2000 census ===
As of the 2000 census, there were 49,321 people, 19,677 households, and 11,058 families residing in the city. The population density was 2,563.0 inhabitants per square mile (989.6/km^{2}). There were 20,838 housing units at an average density of 1,082.8 inhabitants per square mile (418.1/km^{2}). The racial makeup of the city was 93.35% White, 0.86% African American, 2.75% Native American, 0.96% Asian, 0.06% Pacific Islander, 0.58% from some other races and 1.44% from two or more races. Hispanic or Latino people of any race were 1.87% of the population.

The top six ancestry groups in the city are Norwegian (36.4%), German (34.7%), Irish (10.6%), French (6.5%), Polish (6.2%), English (6.1%). There were 21.4% under the age of 18, 22.9% from 18 to 24, 27.7% from 25 to 44, 18.3% from 45 to 64, and 9.8% who were 65 years of age or older. The median age was 28 years. For every 100 females, there were 102.0 males. For every 100 females age 18 and over, there were 100.2 males.

There were 19,677 households, 28.7% had children under the age of 18 living with them, 43.2% were married couples living together, 10.0% had a female householder with no husband present, and 43.8% were non-families. 31.4% of all households were made up of individuals and 8.5% had someone living alone who was 65 years of age or older. The average household size was 2.31 and the average family size was 2.96. The median income for a household in the city was $34,194, and the median income for a family was $47,491. Males had a median income of $30,703 versus $21,573 for females. The per capita income was $18,395. About 9.3% of families and 14.6% of the population were below the poverty line, including 14.6% of those under age 18 and 7.7% of those age 65 or over.

== Economy ==
The economy of Grand Forks is not dominated by any one industry or sector. While agriculture continues to play a role in the area's economy, the city of Grand Forks now has a relatively diverse economy that includes public and private employers in sectors such as education, defense, health care, manufacturing, and food processing. The state and federal governments are two of the largest employers in the Grand Forks area. The University of North Dakota, in the heart of the city, is the largest employer in the metropolitan area. Grand Forks Air Force Base, just west of the city, employs a large number of civilian workers in addition to its military personnel. Altru Health System is the largest private employer in Grand Forks.

=== Largest employers ===
According to the city's 2024 Annual Comprehensive Financial Report, the largest employers in the city are:

Number	Employer	Type of business	Number of employees	Percentage
1	University of North Dakota	Colleges and Universities	5,562	17.35%
2	Altru Health System	General Medical and Surgical Hospitals	3,400	10.61%
3	Grand Forks Air Force Base	Military installation primarily focused on Air Force operations and support	2,897	9.04%
4	Grand Forks Public Schools	Elementary and Secondary Schools	1,700	5.30%
5	Valley Memorial Home	Nursing Care Facilities	818	2.55%
6	LM Wind Power	Designs, manufactures, and services wind turbine blades	560	1.75%
7	City of Grand Forks	Executive and Legislative Offices Combined	527	1.64%
8	Development Homes	Residential Facilities for the Developmentally Disabled	480	1.50%
9	Hugo's (4 locations)	Supermarkets and Other Grocery Stores	460	1.43%
10	J.R. Simplot	International food and agriculture company	440	1.37%
—	Total	—	16,844	52.54%

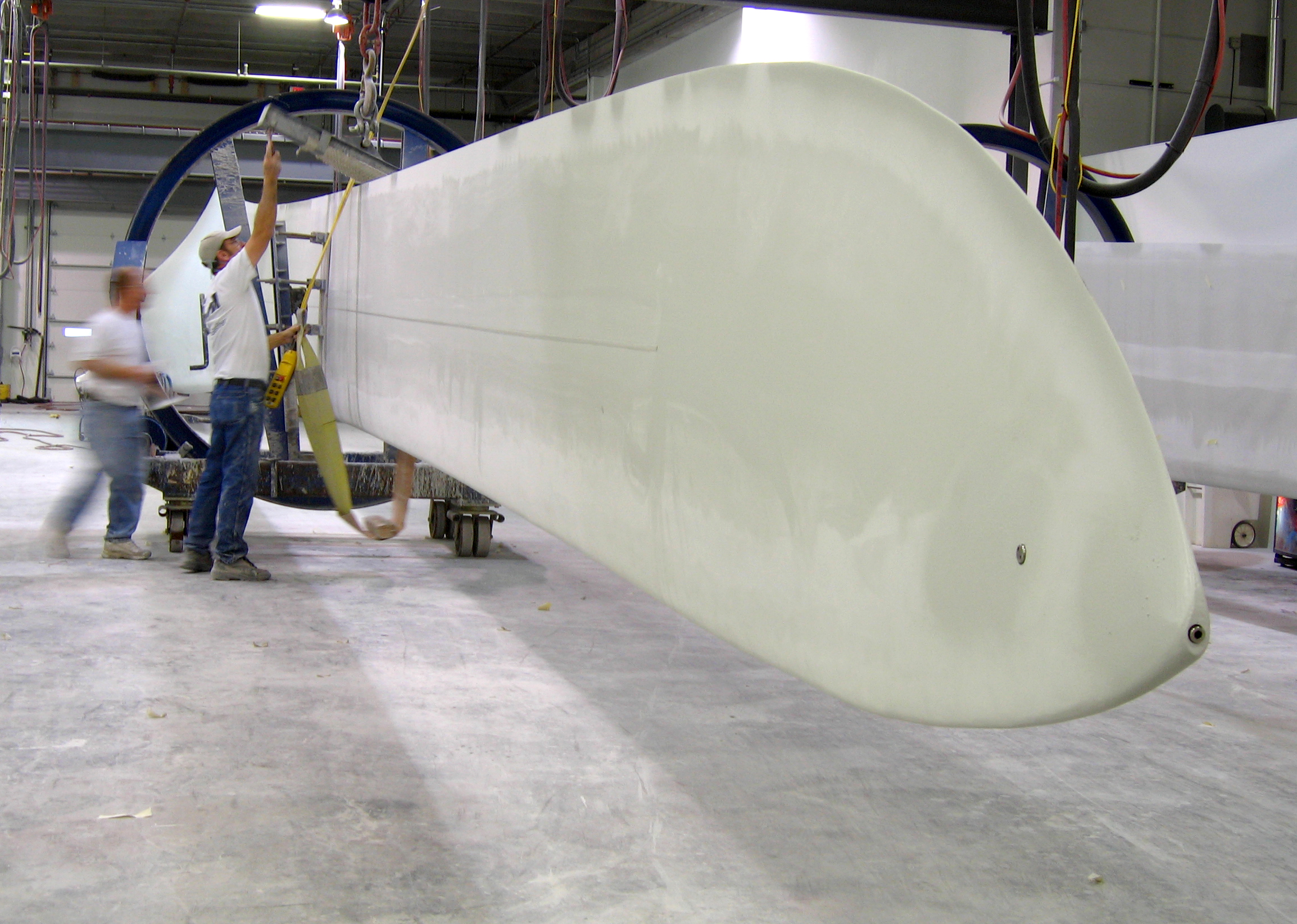
Employees at LM Glasfiber work on a blade for a wind turbine

Major manufacturers in Grand Forks include wind turbine manufacturer LM Wind Fiber and light aircraft manufacturer Cirrus Design. Major food producers include potato processor J. R. Simplot Company and the state-owned North Dakota Mill and Elevator, the nation's largest flour mill. SEI Information Technologies both operate call centers in Grand Forks. Other large private employers in the city include the locally owned Alerus Financial branch of banks, Home of Economy, and the locally owned Hugo's chain of supermarkets.

The retail and service sector is also an important part of the economy. The historic center of shopping in Grand Forks was the downtown area. Today, downtown is home to small shops, bars, and restaurants. The south end of Grand Forks has become another major retail district, with three large shopping centers. The oldest, Grand Cities Mall, is on South Washington Street and contains small, locally owned stores and two churches. With about 70 stores, the city's largest indoor mall is Columbia Mall. The newest major shopping center is the Grand Forks Marketplace power center mall, which features three big box retailers and several smaller stores. Due to its proximity to Canada, the Greater Grand Forks area attracts many shoppers from Manitoba.

=== Economic development ===
The city government is involved in the economic development process, helping firms grow and attracting new firms. A portion of sales tax revenues is set aside for this, some going into the Grand Forks Growth Fund. Companies can request low-interest loans or grants from this fund provided they meet certain criteria, such as paying a relatively high wage and doing most of their business outside the city's trade region. The city also contributes to the Grand Forks Region Economic Development Corporation (EDC), a public-private organization that receives funding from banks and other major businesses. The EDC plays a consulting role for businesses, such as identifying suitable sites for expansion or assembling public funding packages. Its other key role is to vet businesses to see if they are suitable for funding by the Growth Fund.

Community leaders have long seen UND as an "economic engine" for the city. Besides its regular faculty, it has business-like components such as the Energy and Environmental Research Center. UND hosts a technology incubator called the Center for Innovation. More recently, the university has been working to commercialize its research. A major thrust in that direction is the construction of a research park on the western fringes of the campus. Another potential economic opportunity for the city is the addition of the unmanned aerial vehicle (UAV) mission to Grand Forks Air Force Base.

== Culture ==
=== Arts and theater ===
Due at least in part to the presence of the University of North Dakota, Grand Forks offers a variety of arts and cultural events. The North Dakota Museum of Art, on the UND campus, brings many nationally touring exhibits to Grand Forks as well as the work of regional artists. In addition to the Museum of Art, UND offers other gallery space for student art. UND also has Theater Arts and Music departments. Students stage theater productions each year at the Burtness Theater on campus. UND's Chester Fritz Auditorium also brings music and theater events to Grand Forks, including national touring companies of Broadway musicals.

The Greater Grand Forks Symphony Orchestra has been performing since 1905 and the Grand Forks Master Chorale was formed in 1983. Both groups stage productions each year at various locations in the community. The North Dakota Ballet Company is headquartered in Grand Forks and often performs at the Chester Fritz Auditorium. The Grand Forks City Band was formed in 1886 and still stages shows year round.

The Empire Arts Center, in downtown Grand Forks, is home to several cultural events. The Empire, a 1919 movie theater, was restored after the Flood of 1997 and includes performance space, a large movie screen, a gallery, and space for artists. The Fire Hall Theatre, also downtown, is used by community members to put on several theater productions each year. The Summer Performing Arts Company (SPA) is a popular summer arts program for area K–12 students. SPA stages three major musicals mid-July. The Myra Museum, on Belmont Road near the Greater Grand Forks Greenway, is a small history museum with exhibits that trace local history from the Ice Age through settlement and into the modern age. Other buildings on the Myra Museum grounds include the original 1868 Grand Forks Post Office, a 1917 one-room school, and the historic Campbell House.

=== Sports ===
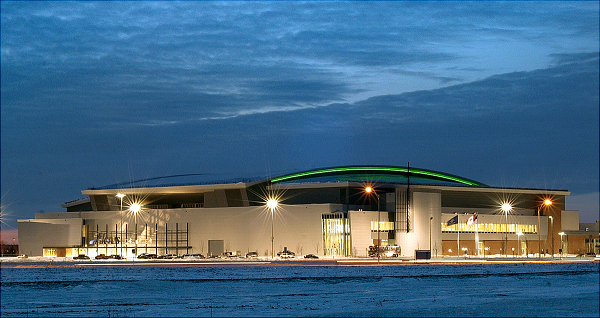
Alerus Center

College sports are popular in Grand Forks, with an intense following for the University of North Dakota. The UND men's ice hockey team competes in the NCAA Division I level and has been the Frozen Four championship team eight times and the runner-up five times. The UND football team was the 2001 NCAA Division II champion and the 2003 runner-up. In 2006, the university announced that it would be moving its entire athletic program to Division I.

Grand Forks is home to two major indoor athletic arenas. The city-owned Alerus Center opened in 2001. The Alerus Center is home to the University of North Dakota football team and also plays host to a variety of other events including major concerts. The Alerus Center is the largest arena and convention center complex in the upper Midwest area. The University of North Dakota hockey teams compete in the Ralph Engelstad Arena, in the University Village district of the UND campus. "The Ralph", as it is commonly called, was funded by UND benefactor Ralph Engelstad and opened in 2001 at a cost of over $100 million. Adjacent to the Ralph Engelstad Arena is the smaller Betty Engelstad Sioux Center. "The Betty" is the home of the University of North Dakota basketball and volleyball teams.

=== Recreation ===
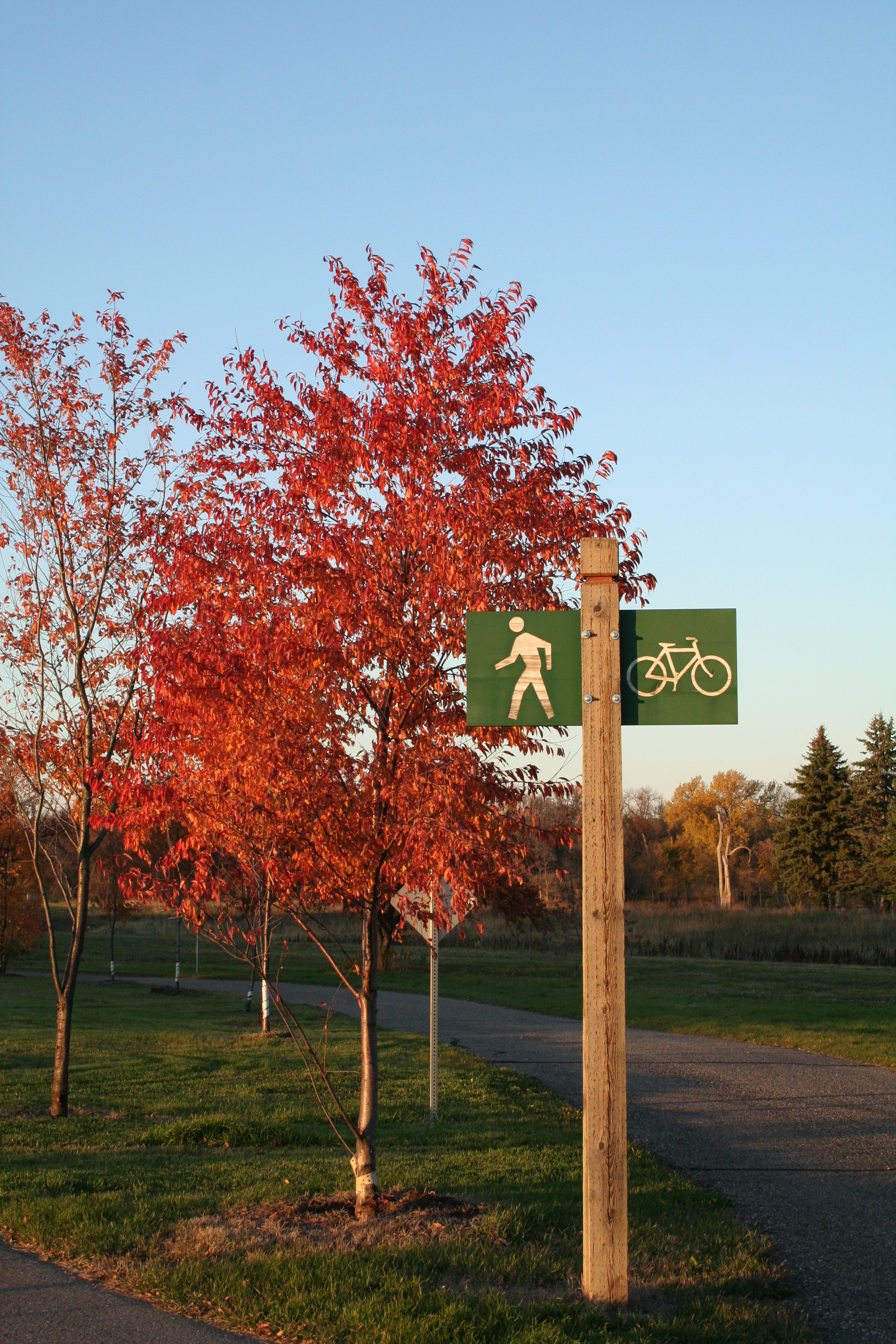
The Greater Grand Forks Greenway

The Grand Forks Park District, established in 1905, operates 14 neighborhood parks, 28 tennis courts, 2 swimming pools, and 3 splash parks. The parks include features such as playgrounds, baseball fields, softball fields, soccer fields, basketball courts, tennis courts, and picnic areas. Sertoma Park includes a Japanese garden. The Park District also operates eleven outdoor skating rinks and indoor ice arenas: Purpur Arena, Eagles Arena, Blueline Club Arena, Gambucci Arena, Rydell Arena, and Judd arena. The district also owns the Choice Health & Fitness.

Several golf courses are in the city and the surrounding area. The Park District operates the 18-hole, Arnold Palmer-designed, links style King's Walk Golf Course and the historic, 9-hole Lincoln Golf Course. The University of North Dakota operated the 9-hole Ray Richards Golf Course. However were forced to sell the course in 2016 leaving it abandoned but reopened in 2020. The 18-hole Grand Forks Country Club is directly south of the city. There are also golf courses in nearby East Grand Forks, Minnesota and Manvel, North Dakota.

The Greater Grand Forks Greenway is a large park that runs the length of the Red River in the city. It includes an extensive path system, large festival grounds, ski trails, and wildflower gardens. Including the Greenway, the Andrew Hampsten Bikeway System in Grand Forks is over 43 miles (69 km) long. These paths are in The Greenway, next to major streets, and on the banks of the English Coulee. There are also two pedestrian/bicycle bridges that span the Red River, connecting Grand Forks' and East Grand Forks' paths.

University Park is one of the parks with an adjacent school, West Elementary School (1949), which was deliberately sited there to help serve the students' recreational and exercise needs.

== Government ==
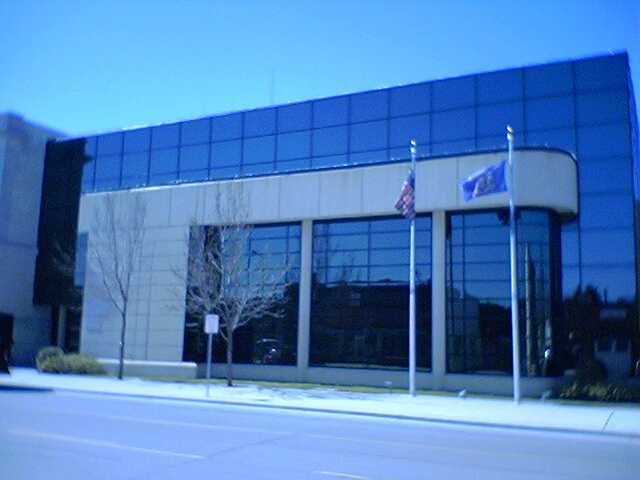
Grand Forks City Hall

City government:
Mayor	Brandon Bochenski
Ward 1	Danny Weigel
Ward 2	Rebecca Osowski
Ward 3	Tricia Berg
Ward 4	Tricia Lunski
Ward 5	Mike Fridolfs
Ward 6	Dana Sande
Ward 7	Ken Vein

Grand Forks has a mayor-council government. The mayor, who is elected every four years, oversees the administration of city government and works directly with department heads to ensure the proper provision of services. The mayor of Grand Forks is former NHL hockey player and real estate developer Brandon Bochenski. Bochenski defeated Michael Brown in the June 9, 2020, mayoral election. Brown served as mayor from 2000 to 2020.

The city is divided into seven wards, with each ward electing a council member to a four-year term. The council meets twice a month and its two main committees, the Finance/Development Committee and Service/Safety Committee, each meet twice a month. All these meetings are broadcast on a local cable channel.

=== Crime ===
Grand Forks
- Crime rates* (2023)

Violent crimes
- Homicide: 0
- Rape: 37
- Robbery: 13
- Aggravated assault: 107
- Total violent crime: 157

Property crimes
- Burglary: 297
- Larceny-theft: 1,225
- Motor vehicle theft: 84
- Arson: 3
- Total property crime: 1,609
- Note: Reported crimes per 100,000 population Source: 2023 FBI UCR Data

According to the Uniform Crime Report statistics compiled by the Federal Bureau of Investigation (FBI) in 2023, there were 157 violent crimes and 1,609 property crimes per 100,000 residents. Of these, the violent crimes consisted of 0 murders, 37 forcible rapes, 13 robberies and 107 aggravated assaults, while 297 burglaries, 1,225 larceny-thefts, 84 motor vehicle thefts and 3 acts of arson defined the property offenses.

== Education ==
=== Higher education ===
The University of North Dakota (UND), the state's oldest university and home to its only schools of medicine and law, is at Grand Forks. UND is known for its John D. Odegard School of Aerospace Sciences, which includes an Air Traffic Control Training program that in October 2009 the FAA ranked No.1 in the nation for the second consecutive year. UND and North Dakota State University make up the Red River Valley Research Corridor.

Northland Community and Technical College, a two-year school, is across the Red River in East Grand Forks. The University of Minnesota Crookston is in nearby Crookston, Minnesota.

=== Primary and secondary schools ===
The Grand Forks Public Schools system includes the Grand Forks and Grand Forks Air Force Base school districts. The majority of Grand Forks is in Grand Forks Public School District 1. A small portion of the city limits is in Manvel Public School District 125. Enrollment is about 7,400. There is one singular Head Start program, ten elementary schools, a combined elementary and middle school (Twining), three middle schools (Schroeder, South, and Valley), two high schools (Central High and Red River High), an alternative high school, and an adult education program. Grand Forks Public Schools is governed by a nine-member board of elected representatives, separate from the city and county governments.

There are several primary schools that are not part of the public school system, including the state-operated North Dakota School for the Blind. There are two Catholic schools offering classes from kindergarten through sixth grade. The only private high school in the metropolitan area is Sacred Heart High School, a Catholic school, in East Grand Forks. There is a non-denominational Christian elementary and middle school in East Grand Forks.

Six of the city's Mid-Century Modern-style schools were listed on the National Register of Historic Places in 2020 for their architecture.

== Media ==
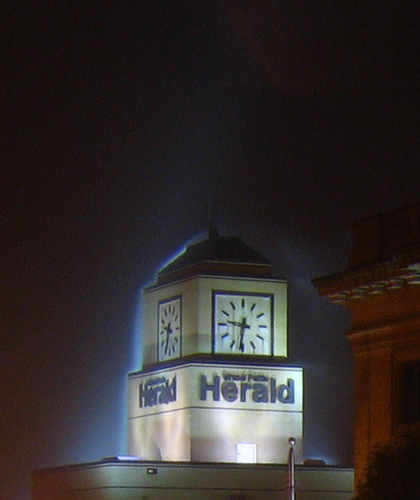
The clock tower of the Herald building in downtown Grand Forks

The Grand Forks Herald is the major daily newspaper serving Grand Forks and the second most widely circulated newspaper in North Dakota with a daily circulation of around 31,000. The Exponent is a weekly newspaper published in East Grand Forks, Minnesota. The University of North Dakota also has a student-published newspaper, The Dakota Student, which is published twice weekly during the school year.

The major AM radio station in Grand Forks is KNOX 1310, which is a news and talk station, also heard at 107.9 FM. Nonprofit KWTL 1370 AM broadcasts Catholic programming, also heard at 92.5 FM. Other commercial AM radio stations include sports station KKXL-AM 1440; classic rock station KGFK 1590, also heard at 95.7 FM; and news/talk KROX 1260, also heard at 92.1 FM. The city's FM stations include NPR affiliates KUND-FM 89.3, KFJM 90.7, KQMN 91.5, and KNTN 102.7. Other nonprofit FM stations include K-Love's K237ER 95.3; and 3ABN's KOBT-LP 101.3. Commercial FM stations include active rock station KJKJ 107.5; top 40/CHR stations KKXL-FM 92.9 and KZGF 94.7; country stations KSNR 100.3 and KYCK 97.1; adult contemporary station KZLT-FM 104.3; contemporary Christian music station KKEQ (K285BG) 104.9, and classic hits station KQHT 96.1.

Grand Forks is part of the Fargo television market, covering eastern North Dakota and western Minnesota. Major television affiliates include WDAZ-TV (ABC), K30LR-D (CBS), KBRR-TV (FOX) and KVLY-TV (NBC).

== Infrastructure ==
=== Transportation ===
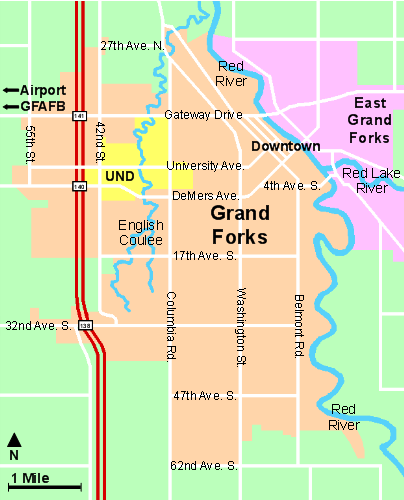
Map of Grand Forks, North Dakota

==== Public transit ====
The city maintains a bus system, Cities Area Transit (CAT). It has operated since 1926, when it was introduced to replace an earlier streetcar system. There are 12 bus routes, including night service and service in East Grand Forks.

Intercity bus service to the city is provided by Jefferson Lines.

==== Rail ====
The BNSF Railway runs track in several directions in and around the city. Amtrak passenger service on the Empire Builder line heads westbound daily at 5:34 am and eastbound daily at 2:10 am. The Empire Builder stops at the Grand Forks Amtrak station.

==== Air ====
Grand Forks International Airport (GFK, KGFK) is served by Delta Air Lines with several daily round trips to Minneapolis-St. Paul International Airport and by Allegiant Air, which operates flights a few times a week to Mesa, Arizona (Phoenix-Gateway), Sanford, Florida (Orlando-Sanford), and Las Vegas, Nevada. A passenger terminal completed in 2011 allows more passengers to come through the airport, improves circulation, has a baggage claim, and addresses security and safety concerns. The airport was a major distribution center for FedEx, which conducts flights daily within the state and northern Minnesota, until FedEx moved its flight operations to Fargo in 2016. The airport is one of the busiest in the country, due in large measure to the presence of UND's John D. Odegard School of Aerospace Sciences.

==== Streets and roads ====
Within the city, roads that run north to south are generally called "streets" and roads that run east to west are generally called "avenues". Streets are numbered in blocks west of the Red River. Avenues are numbered in blocks north or south of DeMers Avenue, the city's historic dividing route next to the railyards.

Three federal highways pass through Grand Forks: U.S. Route 2, Interstate 29, and U.S. Route 81. U.S. Highway 2, known as Gateway Drive in the city, runs east to west through the northern part of town and is a four-lane highway. The highway is the primary connection between Grand Forks, East Grand Forks, the Grand Forks Air Force Base, Grand Forks International Airport, and Crookston, Minnesota. Interstate 29 runs north to south along the western part of the city, officially multiplexed with U.S. Highway 81 in the Grand Forks area. The U.S. Highway 81 business route, Washington Street and 32nd Avenue, runs through many of the city's major commercial districts.

=== Health care ===
With over 4,100 employees and nearly 300 physicians and advanced practice providers (nurse practitioners and physician assistants), Altru Health System is the main provider of health care in Greater Grand Forks and the surrounding region. Serving more than 220,000 residents in northeast North Dakota and northwest Minnesota, Altru provides an array of services. As the first member of the Mayo Clinic Care Network, Altru's providers have access to clinically integrated tools extending Mayo Clinic's knowledge and expertise to patients. Altru is also Grand Forks's largest private employer. Offering all private patient rooms, Altru's Columbia Road Campus includes Altru Hospital (257 beds), Altru Rehabilitation Center (20 beds) and multiple clinics. Altru's South Washington Medical Park features Altru Specialty Center (45 beds), Altru Professional Center and Yorhom Medical Essentials.

The Sanny and Jerry Ryan Center for Prevention and Genetics, housed in Choice Health & Fitness, encourages people to consider preventive measures before it becomes medically necessary to seek care. It is the first of its kind in the region. Truyu Aesthetic Center, with locations in Grand Forks, East Grand Forks and across the region, offers surgical and non-surgical procedures, services and products under Altru's support. Altru is the result of a 1997 merger of United Hospital (formerly Deaconess and St. Michael's Hospitals) and the Grand Forks Clinic.

Grand Forks is also home to several long-term care facilities, serving many of the area's elderly: The Valley Memorial Homes, St. Anne's, Edgewood Parkwood Place, and Maple View Memory Care.

== Sister cities ==
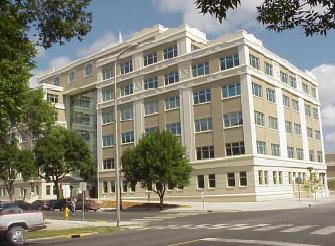
Grand Forks County Office Building

Grand Forks sister cities:

- Dickinson, North Dakota, US
- Sarpsborg, Norway
- Awano, Tochigi, Japan (defunct)
- Ishim, Tyumen Oblast, Russia (inactive)

Grand Forks has an active sister city program designed to encourage cultural and economic exchanges. Its first sister city was Ishim in the Soviet Union. That relationship formally began in 1984 during the Cold War. Sometime in the late 1990s, political and economic turmoil in Russia ended the relationship. While the relationship with Ishim faded, Grand Forks found a new sister in Awano, Japan. An informal relationship began in 1994 when the school districts of both cities began exchanging students. In 1998, the two formally proclaimed themselves sister cities. The best publicly available testament to the relationship between the two is a Japanese rock garden in Grand Forks's Sertoma Park and a sculpture of an American bison in an Awano park. The annexation of Awano by the larger city of Kanuma led to the end of the sister city relationship, but Kanuma and Grand Forks continue to partner in a yearly educational exchange of high school students. Grand Forks's relationship with Dickinson, North Dakota, began in 2002, when delegations from each city visited the other. Grand Forks Mayor Michael Brown said he thought having friends in western North Dakota, which typically has diverging interests from eastern cities, could help at the state legislature. Sarpsborg, Norway, became a sister city in 2005 after several exchanges among leaders from both cities. The city became interested in building a relationship with Sarpsborg because many Grand Forks residents have Norwegian heritage.
