= Cities Area Transit =

Public transit system in North Dakota and Minnesota

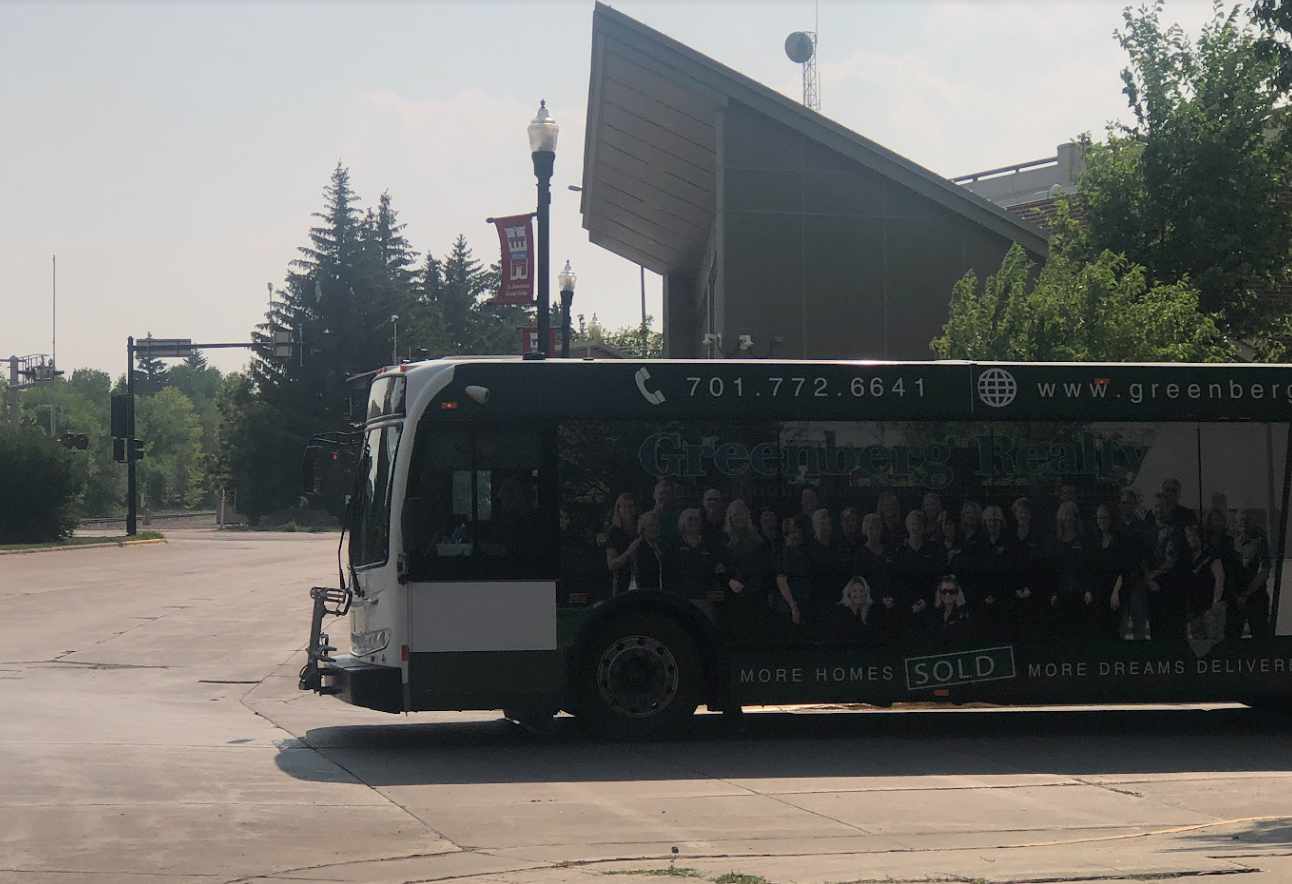
- A Cities Area Transit bus at the Downtown Transit Center in Grand Forks.
- Founded: early-1980's
- Headquarters: 255 North 4th Street, Grand Forks, ND
- Service area: Grand Forks, North Dakota; East Grand Forks, Minnesota
- Service type: Bus service, Dial-a-Ride
- Routes: 15
- Fleet: 39
- Daily ridership: 780 Riders Per Day (2024)
- Annual ridership: 282,270 (2024)
- Website: CAT Bus

Cities Area Transit (CAT) is the public transportation system in the neighboring cities of Grand Forks, North Dakota, and East Grand Forks, Minnesota. The scheduled transit bus routes are operated by the city of Grand Forks and service is provided to East Grand Forks through a cost-sharing agreement. Paratransit for those who are unable to use the regular bus under the ADA, and a service for seniors, are provided under contract by Grand Forks Taxi.

== History ==
Public transportation in Grand Forks was originally provided by the Grand Forks Street Railway Company which operated five street car lines that connected Downtown Grand Forks with the University of North Dakota campus, the Grand Forks County fairgrounds, the neighborhoods of Lincoln Park and Riverside Park, and the community of East Grand Forks, Minnesota. The service completely switched over to buses on July 1, 1934.

== Routes ==
Routes generally run from 6:00 am to 10:00 pm Monday-Friday, and 8:00 am to 10:00 pm on Saturday (No service is offered Sundays or federal holidays). A Night route covers the city from approximately 5:55 pm to 10:00 pm, with service finishing for the night at 10:00 pm. Routes operate once per hour unless otherwise noted. The #4 and #6 offer coordinated service once every 30 minutes along the University Avenue corridor (the individual branches operate once per hour). Additionally, the #12 and #13 complement each other, with the #12 operating eastbound, and becoming a westbound #13 on the return trip. A similar arrangement exists with the #8 and #9. The #10 and #11 offer 2 buses per hour between the central portion of East Grand Forks, and the Metro Transit Center. The #1 and #2 do not overlap but interline at the Metro Transit Center.

Most routes pass by the Metro Transit Center (which is the location of the headquarters), at 450 Kittson Avenue, with the exception of the routes 8 and 9.

Scheduled bus route details are listed below:

Name	Description	Notes
Red Route 1	UND Campus – Stanford Center – Downtown	
Red Route 2	Valley Middle School – St. Anne's – Downtown	
Orange Route 3	Altru Columbia Rd – Midtown – Downtown	
Orange Route 4	Northland College – Campbell Library – Downtown	East Grand Forks north major shopping and educational services areas
Green Route 5	UND Campus – West Walmart – Downtown	UND service runs east and west along University Avenue. Operates every 15-30 minutes
Light Blue Route 6	Northland College – Campbell Library - Downtown	East Grand Forks north major shopping and educational services areas
Blue Route 7	Columbia Mall – Midtown – Downtown	
Purple Route 8	Altru Columbia Rd – Target – UND Campus	UND service runs east and west along University Avenue
Pink Route 9	Target – Altru Columbia Rd – UND Campus	UND service runs east and west along University Avenue
Gold Route 10	Choice Health & Fitness – Walmart – Downtown	
Grey Route 22	Evening Service Only	5:50 pm – 9:55 pm
UND Red Route	University Ave – Campus Road	15-minute service, runs clockwise from 7:38 am – 4:38 pm
UND Blue Route	Campus Road – University Ave	15-minute service, runs counterclockwise from 7:31 am – 4:31 pm
UND Purple Route	University Ave – 6th Ave – Wellness Center – Med School	20-minute service, runs clockwise from 7:37 am – 4:37 pm
UND Night Route	UND Campus Evening Service Only	30-minute service (Monday-Thursday only) from 5:08 am – 9:54 pm

== Fares ==
The Cities Area Transit fares are:

Type	Cash Fare	10-Ride Card	31-Day Pass	14-Day Pass	Day Pass	Summer Pass
Adult	$2.00	$17.50	$40.00	$21.00	$6.50	N/A
K-12 Student	$1.00	$8.50	$40.00	$21.00	$6.50	$21.00
Seniors Age 62+	$0.80	$7.00	$40.00	$21.00	$6.50	N/A
Disabled Card Holder	$0.80	$7.00	$40.00	$21.00	$6.50	N/A
Medicare Card Holder	$0.80	$7.00	$40.00	$21.00	$6.50	N/A

== Downtown Transfer Station ==
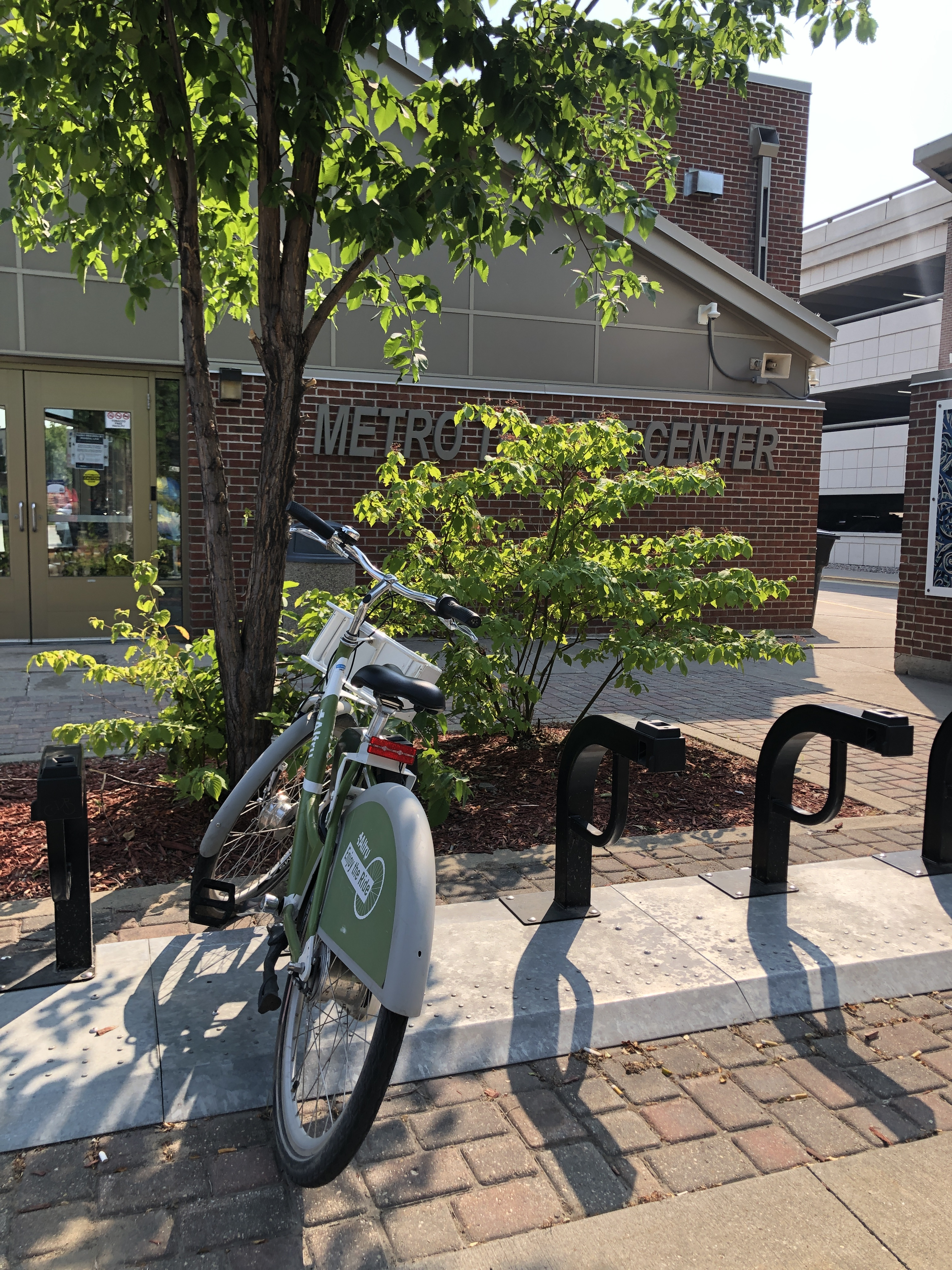
Metro Transit Center in Downtown Grand Forks

The Downtown Transfer Station, also known as the Metro Transit Center, is located at 450 Kittson Avenue and serves as the primary hub for Cities Area Transit. The hub serves eight routes, as well as providing intercity bus service through Jefferson Lines.

== Fixed route ridership ==
The ridership and service statistics shown here are of fixed route services only and do not include demand response. Per capita statistics are based on the Grand Forks urbanized area as reported in NTD data. Starting in 2011, 2010 census numbers replace the 2000 census numbers to calculate per capita statistics.

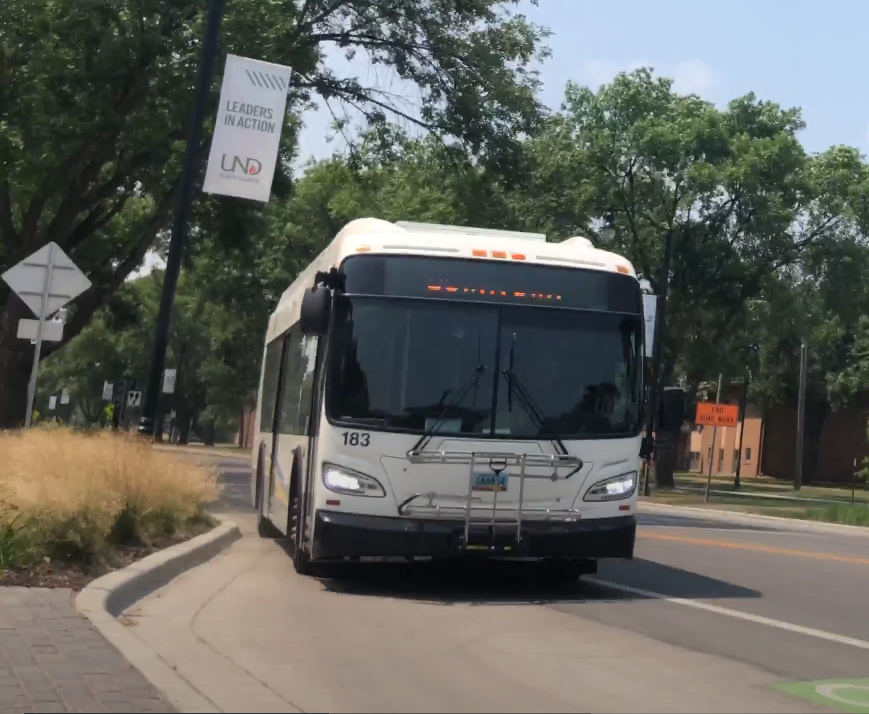
A CATS Bus at UND in 2021

Year	Ridership	Change	Ridership per capita
2005	226,598	N/A	4.01
2006	217,116	▼4.18%	3.84
2007	215,234	▼0.87%	3.8
2008	257,816	▲19.78%	4.56
2009	271,704	▲5.39%	4.8
2010	282,615	▲4.02%	5.0
2011	328,880	▲16.37%	5.37
2012	371,242	▲12.88%	6.06
2013	364,317	▼1.87%	5.95
2014	346,673	▼4.84%	5.66
2015	336,652	▼2.89%	5.49
2016	317,992	▼5.54%	5.19
2017	280,289	▼11.86%	4.57
2018	253,657	▼9.50%	4.14
2019	225,141	▼11.24%	3.67
2020	141,914	▼36.97%	2.32
2021	174,762	▲23.15%	2.85
2022	233,844	▲33.81%	3.82
2023	258,970	▲10.74%	4.23
2024	282,270	▲9.00%	

== See also ==
- List of bus transit systems in the United States
- Bis-Man Transit
- MATBUS
- Minot City Transit
