= North Dakota Mill and Elevator =

- U.S. National Register of Historic Places
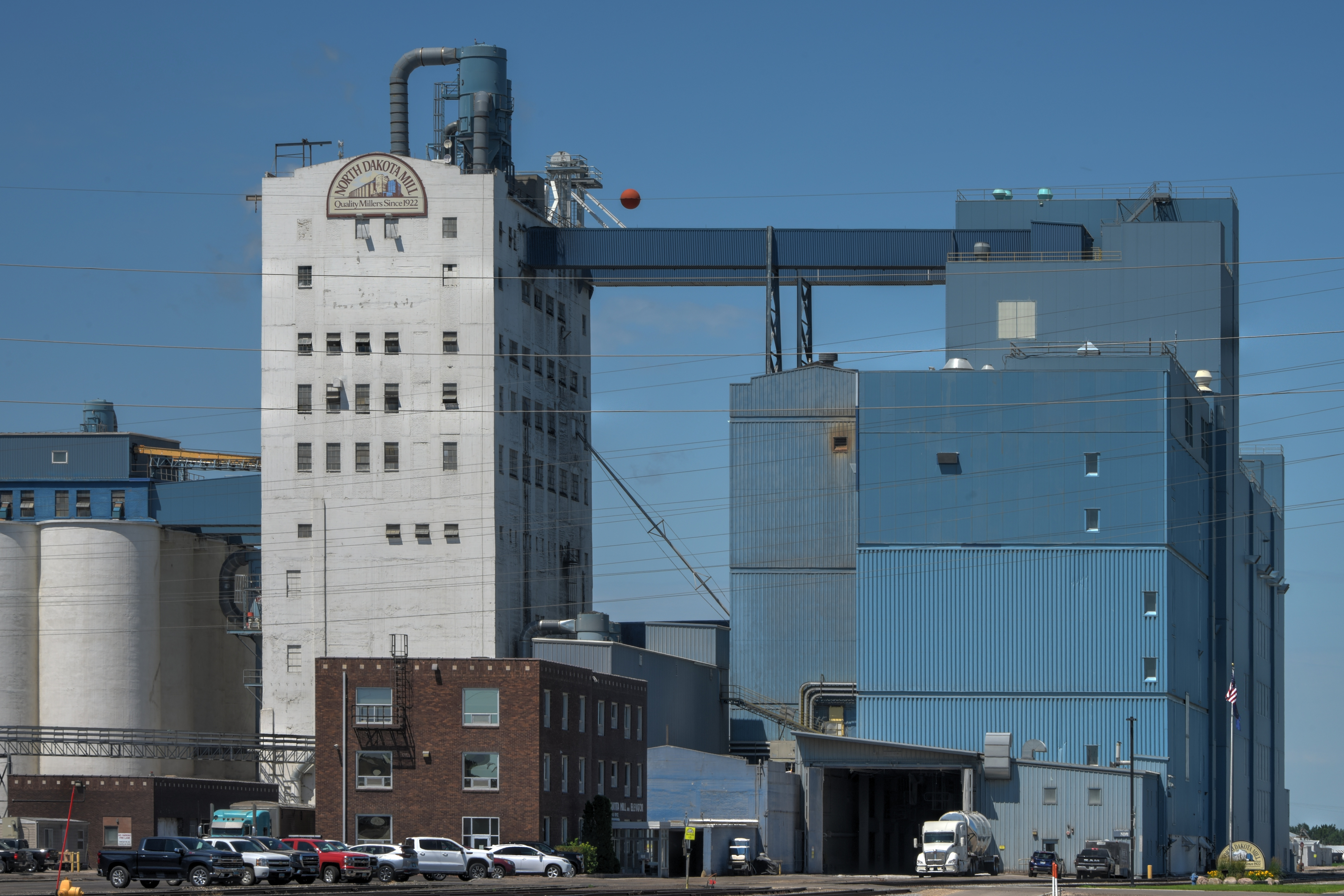
- The North Dakota Mill in 2022

- Location within North Dakota Location within the United States
- Location: Grand Forks, North Dakota
- Coordinates: 47°56′20.98″N 97°3′20.91″W
- Built: 1922
- Architect: Charles S. Pillsbury Co.; et al.
- Architectural style: Romanesque
- NRHP reference No.: 92000433
- Added to NRHP: May 11, 1992

The North Dakota Mill and Elevator is the largest flour mill in the United States. It is located in the city of Grand Forks, North Dakota. Established by the state government when it was led by Nonpartisan League representatives, it is the only state-owned milling facility in the United States. It is overseen by the North Dakota Industrial Commission, whose members are all public officers elected by popular vote.

== History ==
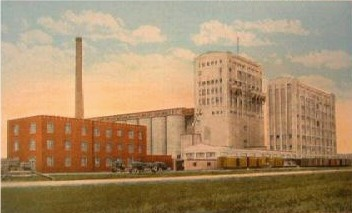
Postcard of the mill in its early years

The North Dakota Mill and Elevator Association started operations on October 22, 1922. The facility was built by the state as a way of bypassing what many area wheat farmers considered unfair business practices on the part of the railroads and milling facilities in Minneapolis, Minnesota. Immigrants especially felt that they were disadvantaged by the actions of major capitalists in the big cities.

In the early 1900s, the flour mills and grain exchange in Minneapolis were the primary wheat markets for North Dakotan farmers and elevators. After freight costs to Minneapolis were deducted from Minneapolis market prices, North Dakotan farmers received a low price for their wheat. The North Dakota Mill was established by the Nonpartisan League leaders, which then controlled the state government, to help solve this problem and benefit local farmers.

The North Dakota Mill facilities include seven milling units, a terminal elevator and a packing warehouse to prepare bagged products for shipment. The Mill's offerings include not only flour, but also newer products such as bread machine mixes, pancake mixes, and organic wheat products.

Logo of the North Dakota Mill and Elevator

== See also ==
- Nonpartisan League

== Other sources ==
- Morlan, Robert L. (1955) Political Prairie Fire: The Nonpartisan League, 1915-1922 (Minneapolis: University of Minnesota Press) ISBN 978-0816658305
- Lipset, Seymour M. (1971) Agrarian Socialism (Berkeley: University of California Press)
