= Bis-Man Transit =

Public transportation in Bismarck and Mandan, ND

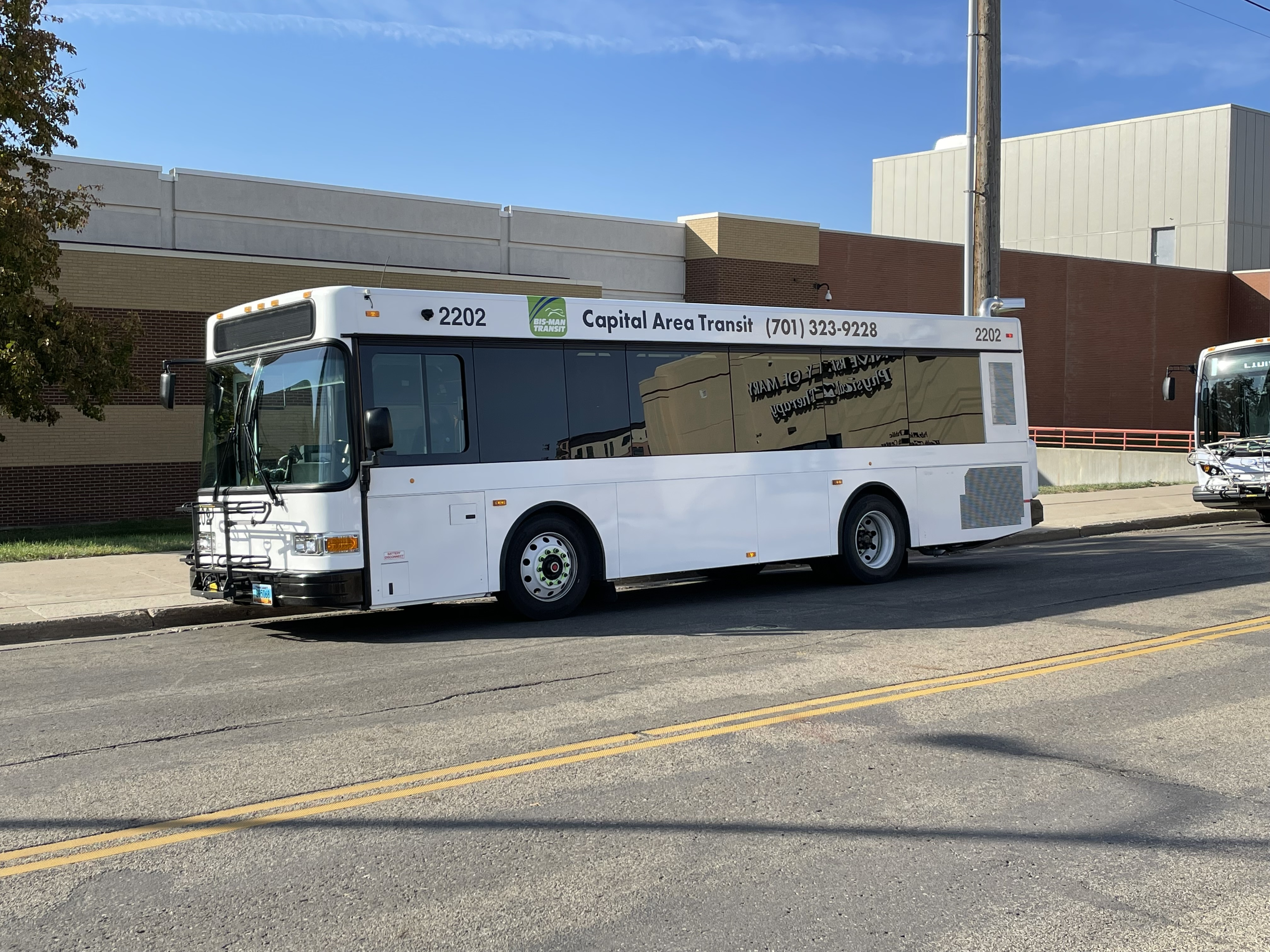
- A Capital Area Transit bus in downtown Bismarck
- Founded: April 28, 1987
- Headquarters: 3750 East Rosser Avenue, Bismarck, ND
- Service area: Bismarck–Mandan
- Service type: Bus service, Dial-a-Ride
- Routes: 6
- Hubs: 3
- Fleet: 34
- Website: Bis-Man Transit

Bis-Man Transit is the public transportation system in the neighboring cities of Bismarck, North Dakota and Mandan, North Dakota. The scheduled transit bus routes are branded as CAT (Capital Area Transit) and operated by the non-profit Bis-Man Transit Board. The Bismarck-Mandan fixed route system is a flag down system, which means a bus can be stopped anywhere along the route, as long as it is not in a no stop zone. Paratransit is provided for those who are unable to use the regular bus under the ADA.

== History ==
Bismarck formerly had an electric streetcar system from February 16, 1904, to February 28, 1931. The Bis-Man Transit Board was officially formed on April 28, 1987, with the aim of providing transportation for the elderly and those with disabilities. While a 1989 study deferred on providing fixed route transit service, paratransit service was strongly recommended and began in May 1990.

The push to start a fixed route system to serve Bismarck and Mandan began in August 2000 when consultants were hired to conduct a transit study. In February 2001, three options were explored through the study: (1) No changes, (2) Expand demand response and add 5 fixed routes, (3) Decrease demand response and add 10-12 fixed routes. Bis-Man Transit decided to pursue option 2 under the branding of Capital Area Transit (CAT). A competition was held among Bismarck State College commercial art class students to design a logo for CAT, Catherine Dalzell's winning design was chosen in December 2003. On May 6, 2004, the official dedication of Capital Area Transit took place, with the system's first rides taking place on May 10. Free rides were given during May and June to introduce the new service to the area.

In August 2023, Bis-Man Transit received a $5,000 grant to replace bus stop signs that were outdated, or located in the wrong locations.

== Facilities ==
The Downtown transfer hub is located on East Front Avenue between South 5th Street and South 7th Street. Two shelters serve as the primary hub for Bis-Man Transit with 5 routes terminating here.

The Bismarck-Mandan Transit Center on East Rosser Avenue was constructed in 1998, and serves as the headquarters and maintenance facility. The facility is served by Route 5, as well as intercity buses from Jefferson Lines.

== Fixed Route Ridership ==
The ridership and service statistics shown here are of fixed route services only and do not include demand response. Per capita statistics are based on the Bismarck urbanized area as reported in NTD data. Starting in 2011, 2010 census numbers replaced the 2000 census numbers to calculate per capita statistics.

	Ridership	Change	Ridership per capita
2006	104,717	n/a	1.4
2007	111,672	▲6.64%	1.49
2008	136,933	▲22.62%	1.83
2009	131,601	▼3.89%	1.75
2010	127,790	▼2.9%	1.7
2011	124,653	▼2.45%	1.52
2012	141,067	▲13.17%	1.72
2013	135,466	▼3.97%	1.65
2014	138,610	▲2.32%	1.69
2015	133,348	▼3.8%	1.63
2016	125,760	▼5.69%	1.53
2017	98,646	▼21.56%	1.2
2018	107,172	▲8.64%	1.31
2019	102,538	▼4.32%	1.25
2020	55,445	▼45.93%	0.68
2021	56,744	▲2.34%	0.69

== See also ==
- MATBUS
- Minot City Transit
- List of bus transit systems in the United States
