= Alexander Griggs =

American politician (1838–1903)

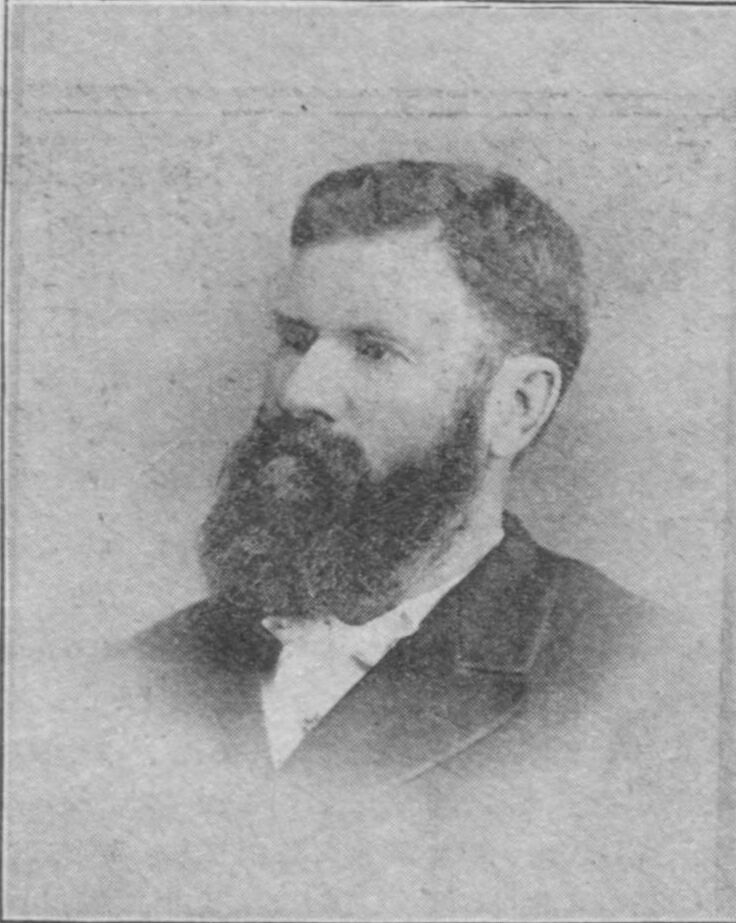

Mayor of Grand Forks
- In office 1888–1889

Personal details
- Born: October 27, 1838 Marietta, Ohio, U.S.
- Died: January 26, 1903 (aged 65) Wenatchee, Washington, U.S.

Alexander Griggs (1838–1903) was an American steamboat captain and politician. He is acknowledged as the founder of the city of Grand Forks, North Dakota, and is called "The Father of Grand Forks." Griggs is also the namesake of Griggs County, North Dakota.

== Early life ==
Griggs was born on October 27, 1838, in Marietta, Ohio. As a child, Griggs and his family moved to Beetown, Wisconsin, and Saint Paul, Minnesota, where he began working on a steamboat.

== Career ==
He first traveled to the confluence of the Red River of the North and the Red Lake River (the site of present-day Grand Forks) in 1870 using flatboats to carry cargo downstream on the Red River of the North. During the fall of 1870, Griggs and his crew embarked on another such trip through the confluence area, but were stranded when their boat froze in the icy waters of the Red River one evening. The crew built a small cabin and lived there during the winter of 1870–1871. They soon decided that the area would be a good spot for a new town. Others soon joined Griggs at the site and the community of Grand Forks was formed. Griggs officially platted the town site of Grand Forks in 1875.

He also became the fifth mayor of Grand Forks, serving from 1888 to 1889. Griggs was also the city's third postmaster, served on the Grand Forks City Council, as a Grand Forks County Commissioner, on the North Dakota state constitutional convention, and as chair of the territorial Board of Railroad Commissioners. In addition, he founded the Second National Bank, established a gas works, built the Grand Forks Roller Mill, constructed the first brick commercial building in Grand Forks, and opened a hotel (the Grigg House). A statue of Griggs sits on the grounds of the Grand Forks County Courthouse.

== Death ==
Griggs died on January 26, 1903, in Wenatchee, Washington.

== Notes ==
Preceded by D.M. Holmes	Mayor of Grand Forks; 1888–1889	Succeeded by H.L. Whithed
