= UND College of Business and Public Administration =

Public administration school at the University of North Dakota

Coordinates: 47°55′17.7″N 97°04′27.2″W

UND Nistler College of Business and Public Administration
- Other name: NCoBPA
- Motto: Learn with Passion, Discover with Purpose, Create Lasting Value, and Transform Lives.
- Type: Public
- Established: 1917; 109 years ago
- Affiliations: Center for Business Engagement & Development, Center for Innovation, Dakota Venture Group, ND SBDC
- Dean: Pat O'Neill
- Faculty: 44
- Students: 1,850
- Postgraduates: 300
- Location: Grand Forks, North Dakota, United States
- Campus: UND Grand Forks
- Website: business.und.edu

The UND Nistler College of Business and Public Administration (NCoBPA) is an American public business school located in Nistler Hall at the University of North Dakota. As of 2025, NCoBPA served 1,850 students and 300 graduate students per year and was the largest business school in the state of North Dakota.

It offers the most business related programs in the North Dakota University Systems. The NCoBPA is the first accredited business college in North Dakota and is one of only 968 accredited business schools world wide.

== History ==
The UND Nistler College of Business and Public Administration was established in 1917. The current dean of the Nistler College of Business and Public Administration is Pat O'Neill who assumed the interim role in July 2025

In 2019 the UND College of Business and Public Administration was renamed to the Nistler College of Business & Public Administration after Werner and Colleen Nistler who donated the lead gift of $20 Million towards the construction of a new business college. As the newly named Nistler College of Business and Public Administration, the college strives to reflect the strong value system that the Nistlers have instilled in their business endeavors and their passion-driven lives.

Werner has served as the Chairman of Touchmark since he founded the company in 1980. For 35 years, he also served as CEO. Currently there are 15 Touchmark communities in the U.S. and Canada.

From 2019 to 2021, UND went through the process of constructing Nistler Hall. The new business college was built to replace the former outdated facility of Gamble Hall. Nistler Hall opened for classes in Fall 2022.

== Institutional milestones ==
- 1917 - Founded as the UND College of Business and Public Administration
- 1926 - Initial accreditation received by the Association to Advance Collegiate Schools of Business (AACSB)
- 1926 - Beta Gamma Sigma chapter established
- 1968 - Construction of Gamble Hall (Building Serving as Business School until 2022)
- 2019 - Renamed to the UND Nistler College of Business and Public Administration, for UND Alumnus Werner & Colleen Nistler
- 2020 - Middleton School of Entrepreneurship & Management established and named for UND Alumni Tom & Konnie Middleton
- 2022- Nistler Hall opens for first academic year
- 2023 - Herr School of Accountancy established and named for UND Alumnus Henry & Judee Herr
- 2026 - Fransen Department of Real Estate, Economics & Finance is established with the launch of a new program in Real Estate. The new major expands on the Department of Economics & Finance's strength in this area and is supported by a gift from Bob Fransen, founder and CEO of Timberland Partners.

== Departments ==
The UND Nistler College of Business and Public Administration has 3 academic departments and 2 schools.

Department/Schools	Department Chair
Herr School of Accountancy	Katherine Campbell
Fransen Department of Real Estate, Economics & Finance	Prodosh Simlai
Middleton School of Entrepreneurship & Management	Sean Valentine
Political Science and Public Administration	Paul Sum
Marketing	Connie Bateman

== Academic Regalia ==
=== Undergrad Tassel ===
- Drab (Light Tan)

=== Graduate Hoods ===
- Master of Accountancy, MACC Drab (tan)
- Master of Business Administration, M.B.A., Drab (tan)
- Master of Public Administration, M.P.A. Peacock Blue
- Master of Science in Applied Economics and Predictive Analytics (MSAEPA), Golden Yellow

== Facilities ==
With a $20 million dollar lead gift from Werner & Colleen Nistler, matching gifts from the State of North Dakota, and over 102 donors and friends, the NCoBPA building campaign reached the finish line on this historical project in Fall 2022.

Nistler Hall is located at the heart of campus placed prominently on the quad (NW corner) along University Avenue.

Nistler Hall features a 5,000 sq. foot auditorium, 20 classrooms, 20 conference rooms, and 96 faculty offices. The community hub is designed as a flexible space for studying, engagement, and campus events.

== Rankings ==
- "Online MBA Program is consistently ranked in the top 20% by U.S. News & World Report. #65 in 2023 rankings.
  1. 2 ranking for Best Online Graduate Programs.
  2. 4 ranking for Most Affordable Online Masters Degree in Economics.
  3. 5 ranking for Best Online MBA Program.

== Accreditation ==
- AACSB International
- National Association of Schools of Public Affairs and Administration (NASPAA).
- ATMAE

== Notable alumni ==
- Troy Badar, CEO of Dairy Queen
- John Barry, CEO of Sun Country Airlines
- Mark Chipman, chairman of TNSE & president of Winnipeg Jets
- Wade Dokken, former CEO of Skandia
- Ralph Engelstad, Las Vegas Casino Owner
- Dave Fennell, Canadian Football League player and founder of Golden Star Resources
- William C. Marcil, CEO of Forum Communications
- Gregory R. Page, president of Cargill
- Ed Schafer, former Governor of North Dakota
- Steve Scheel, CEO of Scheels
- Sally J. Smith, former CEO of Buffalo Wild Wings
- Drew Wrigley, ND Attorney General and former Lt Governor
