= Red River Valley Research Corridor =

The logo of the Red River Valley Research Corridor.

The Red River Valley Research Corridor is the name that has been given to a region in the American state of North Dakota. It roughly comprises the corridor along the Red River of the North. The Research Corridor is anchored by North Dakota State University (NDSU) and the University of North Dakota (UND). The corridor was established in 2002 by United States Senator Byron Dorgan in an effort to draw research dollars to the state. Since that year, Dorgan has helped to direct $300 million to research in the corridor.

== Research at NDSU ==
Areas of research at North Dakota State University include nanoscale science and engineering, microsensors (RFID tags), polymers and coatings, agriculture, combinatorial science, and spintronics. Research at NDSU includes the annual $100+ million NDSU research budget, $78.4 million in annual outlays, $234.9 million in annual direct and secondary impacts, as well as research budgets from other enterprises that are a part of the research park. Many of the research projects at NDSU use federally backed grants, including several from the United States Department of Defense.

The NDSU Research and Technology Park is a 55-acre (223,000 m^{2}) site of innovation and technology; the site sits adjacent to the main NDSU campus. The Research and Technology Park is a public/private partnership between NDSU and private enterprises. As of 2006, the research park employed 511. The park's cornerstone anchor tenant is Phoenix International, a Deere & Company (John Deere) company. Phoenix International develops custom, integrated electronic systems. Other research park facilities include Research 1 (polymers and coatings), Research 2 (nanotechnology), Alien Technology (microsensors, RFID), the Center for High Performance Computing, the Center for Technology Enterprise, and an NDSU controlled Candlewood Suites hotel.

== Research at UND ==
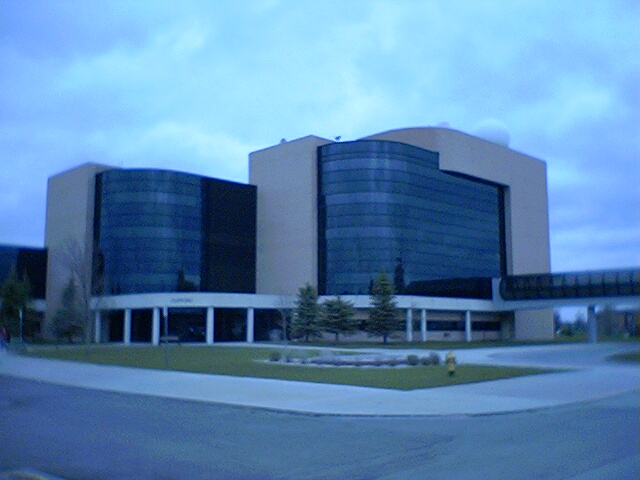
Clifford Hall at UND

Areas of research at the University of North Dakota include biosciences and medicine, energy and the environment, aerospace sciences and engineering, and human health and nutrition.

The UND Technology Park is a 55-acre (223,000 m^{2}) research and technology campus on the west end of the UND campus. Facilities at the research park include two business and technology incubators — the Skalicky Technology Incubator and the Ina Mae Rude Entrepreneur Center. Other buildings in the research park include COELSAT (Center of Excellence in Life Sciences and Technology), Ryan Hall, UND Aerospace Foundation office building, the National Weather Service, BioLife Plasma Services, and a Hilton Garden Inn.

In addition to the UND Technology Park, other research institutions at UND include the Energy and Environmental Research Center (EERC) which includes the National Center for Hydrogen Technology, the UND School of Medicine and Health Sciences, and the United States Department of Agriculture Grand Forks Human Nutrition Research Center.

From now until at least 2010, UND will play host to NASA's Douglas DC-8 "Flying Laboratory" research aircraft. The University's agreement with NASA is valued at $25 million. The aircraft's areas of research include tracking pollution, monitoring the hole in the ozone layer, and studying the atmosphere's chemistry.

One feature of the research park is the Center for Technology Enterprise. The Center is a 49,757 sq ft (4,622.6 m^{2}). building that serves the needs of entrepreneurial endeavors. The center offers venture capital, networking and technical advice, as well as supply services, among others. The building offers wet and dry labs, tenant space, production/manufacturing areas, as well as internet/computer capabilities suitable for expansive research and development. One of the building's major tenants is the Bobcat Company.

== Economic impact ==
Research at both NDSU and UND has an economic impact on the state of North Dakota. A 2007 study showed that research at UND had a statewide economic impact of $135.7 million. The same study showed that UND research generated a total of 1,649 jobs, of which 728 were on campus. Another 2007 study showed that research at NDSU had a statewide economic impact of $100 million. That study showed that NDSU research generated a total of 1,250 jobs, of which 950 were on campus.
