= Grand Forks International Airport =

International Airport in Grand Forks, North Dakota, United States

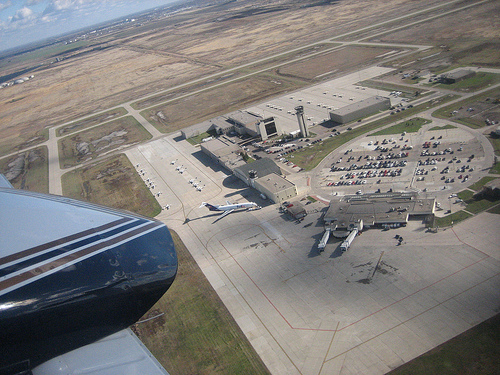
- Aerial view of airport shortly after takeoff from runway 35L
- IATA: GFK; ICAO: KGFK; FAA LID: GFK

Summary
- Airport type: Public
- Operator: Grand Forks Regional Airport Authority
- Location: Grand Forks, North Dakota
- Elevation AMSL: 845 ft (258 m)
- Coordinates: 47°56′57″N 097°10′34″W
- Website: GFKairport.com

Map
- Location of airport in North Dakota GFK (the United States)

Runways
Direction	Length		Surface
Direction	ft	m	Surface
9L/27R	6,701	2,042	Concrete
17L/35R	3,901	1,189	Concrete
17R/35L	7,351	2,240	Asphalt
9R/27L	3,300	1,006	Concrete

Statistics (2023)
- Aircraft operations: 292,371
- Based aircraft: 143
- Total passengers: 183,000
- Sources: Airport website, Bureau of Transportation Statistics, Federal Aviation Administration

Grand Forks International Airport (IATA: GFK, ICAO: KGFK, FAA LID: GFK) is a public airport five miles (8 km) northwest of Grand Forks, in Grand Forks County, North Dakota, United States. GFK has no scheduled passenger flights out of the country but has an "international" title (like many other airports) because it has customs service for arrivals from Canada and other countries.

The airport, sometimes called Mark Andrews International Airport after Mark Andrews, a former U.S. House Representative and U.S. Senator from North Dakota, is owned by the Grand Forks Regional Airport Authority and located on U.S. Highway 2, around four miles (6 km) west of Interstate 29, within city limits in a detached section of the city that is surrounded by Rye Township.

In 2009 the airport's FAA control tower was the 23rd-busiest in the nation, with 346,165 tower operations. About 90% of all operations at GFK are flights operated by the University of North Dakota's John D. Odegard School of Aerospace Sciences, which is based on the field.

It is included in the Federal Aviation Administration (FAA) National Plan of Integrated Airport Systems for 2017–2021, in which it is categorized as a non-hub primary commercial service facility.

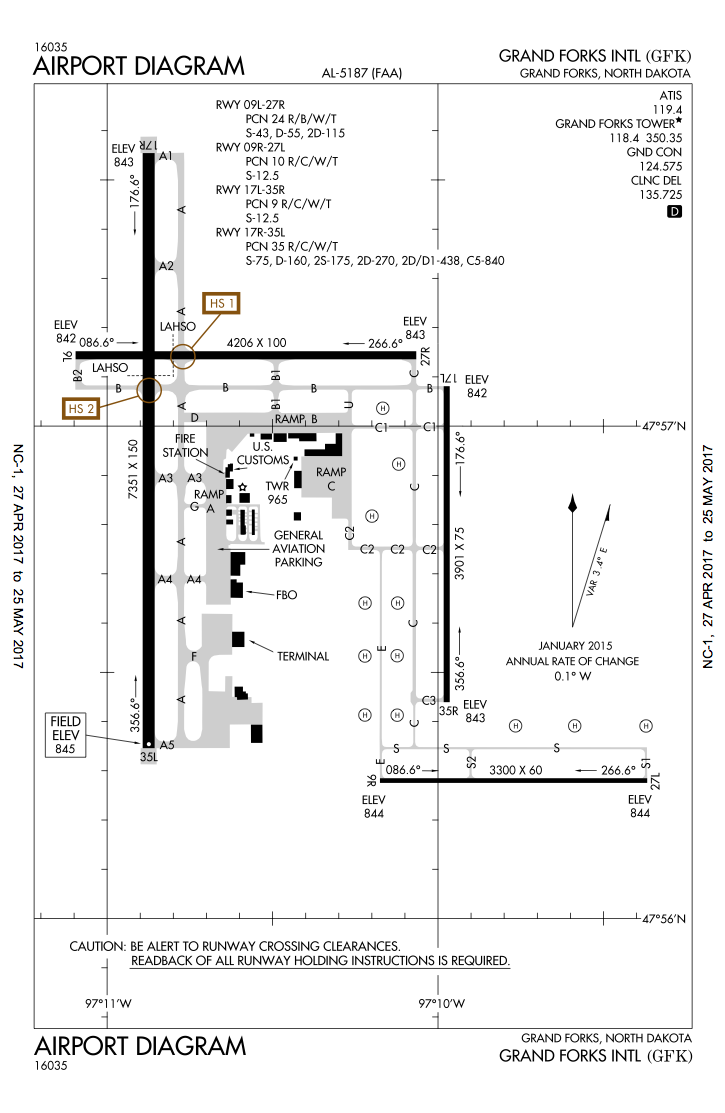
FAA diagram of GFK

== Governance ==
GFK is a non-hub, primary commercial service airport.

The Grand Forks Regional Airport Authority is a public, non-profit organization established as a joint partnership between Grand Forks County and the City of Grand Forks. This is the governance of the airport. The Airport Authority consists of a seven-member Board of Commissioners appointed by the Grand Forks Mayor, Brandon Bochenski, and the Grand Forks County Commission. Dane Simonson is the Chair of the Board followed by Cynthia Pic, Vice Chair. Other members of the board include Karl Bollingberg, Tim Mutchler, Rick Meland, Steve Kuhlman, and Kyle Kvamme. The Airport Authority staff consists of Ryan Riesinger, Executive Director, Krista Martin, Director of Finance/Administration, Katie Olson, Administrative Assistant, and Joey Castiglione, Director of Operations and Maintenance (Grand Forks International Airport, 2023).

== Infrastructure ==
=== Terminal ===
The now closed original passenger terminal at GFK was built in 1964. Outside terminal security were the Delta and Allegiant Airlines ticketing counters, a restaurant, a gift shop and a waiting area. After passing through security screening there was a small waiting area that served the terminal's two passenger gates.

In the mid-2000s, discussion began of upgrading or totally replacing the terminal as it had structural and safety problems and left little to no room for expansion. Findings from a study commissioned by the Grand Forks Regional Airport Authority were released in early 2005. The study, which was done by Ulteig Engineers, gave the Airport Authority options for the future of the passenger terminal. The list of problems included mold growth, roof leakage, differential settlement, blocking runway line of sight, passenger boarding, potential equipment damage from basement flooding, outdated electrical and mechanical systems, no sprinkler system, code deficiencies, insufficient parking setback, and interior traffic circulation issues.

The consulting group recommended that a brand new passenger terminal would the best solution to the current terminal's problems. Five locations for a new terminal were evaluated favoring a site between the cargo apron and general aviation apron. Ground was broken on the new terminal in July 2009, with completion expected by 2011. The building was named the Byron L Dorgan Terminal, in honor of retired North Dakota Senator Byron Dorgan. It was opened and dedicated on August 30, 2011.

The new passenger terminal, designed by JLG Architects, is a two-story building, with Delta and Allegiant ticketing counters, baggage claim carousel, and several rental car agencies. The first floor has an inline checked baggage screening system. The Grand Forks Regional Airport Authority has several offices on the second floor, along with the TSA security checkpoint. Beyond security is a waiting area for both of the airport's gates. Red River Valley Grill also serves both the public and secured side of the airport for concessions and beverages. There is also a small gift shop in the grill.

=== UND Aerospace ===
GFK's largest tenant is not an airline, but the University of North Dakota's John D. Odegard Aerospace Program. The university utilizes 11 heated hangars to house approximately 120 aircraft. A flight operations building that is the headquarters for dispatching aircraft, pre-briefing students for flights, and an on-site cafeteria on the top level of the five-story building. GFK also houses UND's Unmanned Aerial Systems (UAS) training facility. The facility is used for ground briefings, flight simulators, and systems training for students who are pursuing a major focusing on unmanned aircraft. A hangar for UND's helicopter flight training operations was completed in December 2011. A new Flight Operations Center for the university is under construction and is expected to be finished after the school's Fall 2026 semester in late 2026 or early 2027. The center is replacing the previous flight operations building built in 1974.

Most operations (takeoff and landing) at GFK is from the University of North Dakota. The UND Aerospace Foundation occupies the northeastern (Bravo), and eastern (Charlie) ramps on the airport. UND operates a fleet over 120 aircraft including a Cessna 172, Cessna 150s, Piper Seminoles, Piper Archers, and several Beechcraft King Air 90s and a pair of American Champion Decathlons for flight training. Several buildings complement such a fleet of aircraft, including a dispatch center, a full-time maintenance center, and dedicated line support personal.

=== Runways ===
Grand Forks International Airport covers 1,618 acres (655 ha) and has four runways:

- Runway 9L/27R: 6,701 ft × 100 ft (2,042 m × 30 m) concrete
- Runway 17L/35R: 3,901 ft × 75 ft (1,189 m × 23 m) concrete
- Runway 17R/35L: 7,351 ft × 150 ft (2,241 m × 46 m) asphalt
- Runway 9R/27L: 3,300 ft × 60 ft (1,006 m × 18 m) concrete

Due to the increased amount of general aviation traffic, primarily from the UND Aerospace flight training school, a fourth runway has been completed on the southeast side of the airport. It is a parallel east–west runway named 9R/27L. The previous runway 8/26 was renamed in October 2008 to 9L/27R in preparation for the new runway. Plans in 2022 to extend 9L/27R.

=== Based aircraft and operations ===
In the year ending December 31, 2022 the airport had 301,694 aircraft operations, average 826 per day: 62% general aviation, 38% air taxi, <1% commercial, and <1% military. At that time, there were 143 aircraft based at this field: 117 single-engine, 20 multi-engine, 1 jet, and 5 helicopter.

=== FBO ===
Avflight Grand Forks, the fixed-base operator at the airport, completed construction of a new $4.5 million facility in autumn 2008. This 45,000 sq ft (4,200 m^{2}) facility increased Avflight's heated hangar and aircraft support space to 130,000 sq ft (12,000 m^{2}), making it the largest aircraft service center in North Dakota. The previous facilities are now used by wing of the U.S. Customs and Border Protection, housing a number of government aircraft and helicopters. Valley Med Fight, an air ambulance company, also occupies near by hangars, which are managed by Avflight. The FBO also handles all ground operations for Allegiant.

Originally GFK Flight Support, the FBO and its facilities were purchased by the Saginaw, Michigan-based Avflight Corporation and re-branded as Avflight Grand Forks in 2015.

== Airlines and destinations ==
=== Passenger ===
Airlines	Destinations	Refs
Allegiant Air	Seasonal: Las Vegas, Orlando/Sanford, Phoenix/Mesa	
Delta Connection	Minneapolis/St. Paul	

Allegiant Air uses Airbus A320-214s and Airbus A319-111s to Las Vegas, Phoenix, and Orlando. Delta Connection uses Bombardier CRJ900s and Embraer E175s operated by SkyWest Airlines to Minneapolis.

Destinations map
Destinations from Grand Forks International Airport
= Year-round destination
= Seasonal destination
= Future destination

=== Cargo ===
FedEx Express was the second-largest employer at KGFK. The FedEx ramp at KGFK served the entire state of North Dakota, northwestern Minnesota, and small portions of South Dakota and Montana. FedEx had over 100 employees—customer service representatives, ramp agents, couriers, semi-drivers and jet aircraft and vehicle maintenance workers. Ramp agents worked evening or early morning shifts, loading and unloading the aircraft, feeder planes and trucks. FedEx contracted with Corporate Air to provide pilots and maintenance for eleven feeder aircraft. Corporate Air was KGFK's tenth-largest employer.

On February 17, 2016, FedEx announced that it would be moving its operations from the Grand Forks Airport to Fargo's Hector International Airport. FedEx moved all flight operations to Fargo on October 31, 2016.

== Statistics ==
=== Annual traffic ===
Annual passenger enplanements at Grand Forks Airport
Year	Passengers	Change
2013	148,802	-
2014	146,051	▼1.85%
2015	145,272	▼0.53%
2016	131,481	▼9.49%
2017	117,786	▼10.42%
2018	114,839	▼2.50%
2019	117,925	▲2.69%
2020	46,891	▼60.24%
2021	69,780	▲48.81%
2022	89,555	▲28.33%
2023	93,815	▲4.75%
2024	91,922	▼2.02%
2025	93,815	▲2.06%

Busiest domestic routes out of GFK (February 2025 – January 2026)
Rank	City	Passengers	Carriers
1	(Minnesota) Minneapolis–St Paul, MN	64,760	Delta
2	(Nevada) Las Vegas, NV	13,330	Allegiant
3	(Arizona) Phoenix/Mesa, AZ	10,400	Allegiant
4	(Florida) Orlando/Sanford, FL	2,730	Allegiant

On November 9, 2010, GFK had 100,570 boardings, one more than the record achieved in 12 months in 1994. As of April 2014, passenger boardings at GFK had reached 147,000, a 7% increase year-over-year (April 2012 – April 2013).

During the same period, Delta led passenger traffic with 181,550 passengers (arriving and departing) and maintained a 59.64% market share. Allegiant trailed at 117,000 total passengers and a 39.98% market share. Scheduled departures have risen to 5,572, compared to 4,355 in 2010.

On October 3, 2012, United Airlines (operated by United Express) started flying between Denver and Grand Forks. Less than one year later, on September 10, 2013, United announced they would terminate service on December 3, 2013, citing low load factors.

== Ground Transportation ==
As of 2023, there is no public transit service to Grand Forks International Airport. The closest Cities Area Transit bus stop is located over 3 miles away.

== See also ==
- List of airports in North Dakota
