= Flometrics =

Flometrics Logo

Flometrics is a San Diego–based engineering company that was formed in the garage of Dr. Steve Harrington in 1990. The engineers specialize in thermodynamics and fluid dynamics, but were widely publicized for launching a rocket running on a biofuel "developed by the EERC under a DARPA contact."

== Bio-fuel Rocket ==
In July 2009 the Flometrics team launched a Rocketdyne LR-101 engine running on bio-fuel developed by the Energy and Environmental Research Center. The fuel ended up pushing the rocket close to Mach 1 and sending it 20,000 ft into the sky. The fuel was developed with the military grade JP-8 fuel criteria in mind. The rocket was originally designed for use on MythBusters and for RP-1 kerosene based rocket fuel. "This is a unique opportunity for the EERC's renewable fuel," said EERC Director Gerald Groenewold. "Our fuel is already providing a pathway to energy security to the U.S. military and now is becoming an option for ground-to-air missiles and even space flight."

== Appearances ==
The Flometrics staff, especially Dr. Steve Harrington, has made multiple appearances in television and other media outlets.

=== UFO Hunters ===
UFO Hunters, a History Channel "Hoax or History?" show about the science of UFOs, aired an episode about possible underwater alien bases that featured Dr. Harrington and the Flometrics team. The engineers were presenting a set of theories and tests that could possibly explain a mystery about UFOs entering masses of water without making a noticeable splash. The first experiment to test this observation was done by creating a model UFO and attaching air jets around the model to simulate a "force field" that changes the density of the water as the craft enters the water, minimizing the splash. Flometrics also experimented with a hydrophilic coating on the surface of the UFO. Both tests proved reasonably unsuccessful at minimizing the splash.

=== Popular Science ===
Flometrics was mentioned in "Popular Science's" 100 Best Innovations of the Year issue in December 2009 for their use of "Eco Jet Fuel". The fuel was developed by "scientists at the University of North Dakota's Energy and Environmental Research Center and is a vegetable oil that is nearly identical to military-grade JP-8. Flometrics used this fuel to launch a 20-foot rocket 20,000 feet into the air and ran similarly to a rocket using RP-1 refined kerosene fuel. This eventually gave them publicity with the Discovery Channel, as the rocket was originally built for testing with the Mythbusters.

=== Discovery Channel ===
Originally, the bio-fuel rocket was intended for an episode of Mythbusters that was testing whether or not the Confederate Army built and launched one of the first missile rockets. Unfortunately, the rocket was not needed and therefore wasn't used. So the Flometrics team decided to turn it into a bio-fuel rocket. Coincidentally enough, Discovery Channel held on to Flometrics and published an article about the technological advancements of the bio-fuel rocket.

== Notable Technologies ==
=== Pistonless Pump ===
The Pistonless pump is a low pressure pump system originally designed to support NASA projects with the Crew Exploration Vehicle. The CEV needed to be safe with low pressure systems.
