= Dokken (surname) =

Dokken is a Norwegian surname derived from the Norwegian word for "dock".

Notable bearers include:

- Arne Dokken (born 1955), Norwegian football player and coach
- Kenneth Dokken (born 1978), Norwegian football midfielder playing for Sandefjord
- Don Dokken (born 1953), Norwegian-American musician most known for his eponymous band Dokken
- Michael Dokken (born 1971), Norwegian-American stock car race driver
- Siri Dokken (born 1966), Norwegian illustrator
- Wade Dokken (born 1960), Norwegian-American financial writer from North Dakota
