= Sbanken =

Norwegian online banking company

- Type: Public Allmennaksjeselskap
- Industry: Financial services
- Predecessor: Skandiabanken
- Founded: 2000; 2015 (as separate company)
- Founder: Skandia
- Headquarters: Bergen, Norway
- Area served: Norway
- Revenue: ▼1,403,691,000 NOK (2021); 1,458,548,000 NOK (2020)
- Operating income: ▼924,193,000 NOK (2021); 1,077,662,000 NOK (2020)
- Net income: ▼767,230,000 NOK (2021); 784,603,000 NOK (2020)
- Total assets: ▲79,110,860,000 NOK (2021); 75,488,860,979 NOK (2020)
- Owner: DNB Bank
- Number of employees: 400
- Website: sbanken.no

Sbanken is a Norwegian online bank and a concept by DNB Bank. All their banking services are provided by DNB Bank ASA.

The CEO is Øyvind Thomassen.

== History ==
The bank was founded by Skandia as a branch of its existing bank in Sweden, Skandiabanken, on April 27, 2000, and became the first online-only bank in Norway. Skandiabanken Norway was separated from Skandiabanken Sweden and further Skandia group in 2015, becoming its own company Skandiabanken ASA, and was consequently renamed Sbanken ASA on November 6, 2017.

In August 2020, Sbanken had 460,000 customers, and as of 31 December 2019, it had total assets of approx. 93 billion. The bank has over 400 employees.

Sbanken ASA was listed on the Oslo Stock Exchange.

=== Acquisition by DNB ===
On 15 April 2021, DNB announced that it wanted to acquire Sbanken. The Norwegian Competition Authority reviewed the transaction and in November 2021 decided to prohibit it, on the grounds that the acquisition would weaken competition in the market for mutual funds. Following an appeal lodged in December 2021, the Norwegian Competition Appeals Tribunal (Konkurranseklagenemnda) overturned the prohibition on 16 March 2022. The tribunal concluded that it had not been shown that the merger would cause significant harm to competition in the relevant market, and its decision was final.
