= Chester Fritz Library =

Library at the University of North Dakota

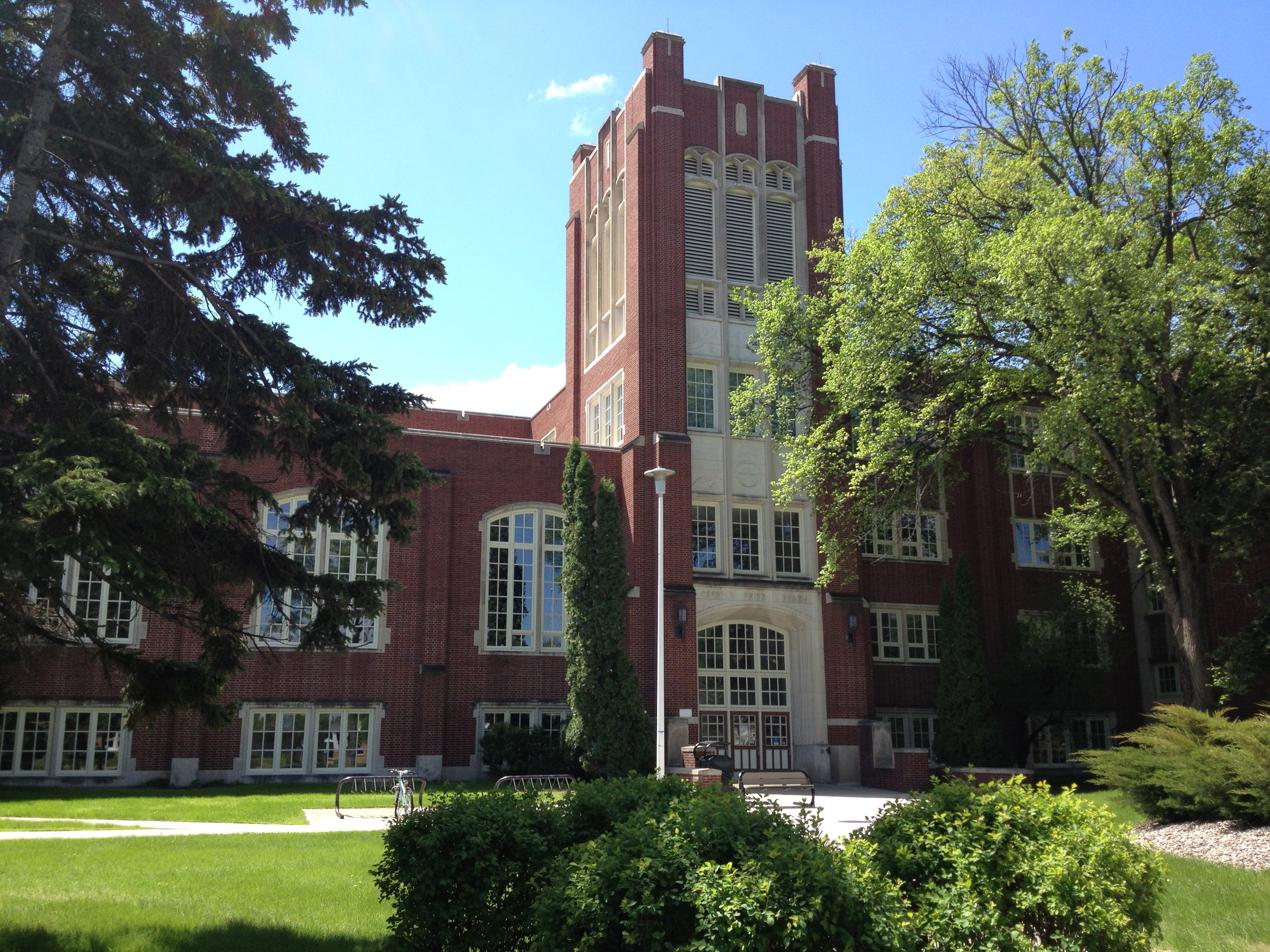
- The Chester Fritz Library at the University of North Dakota

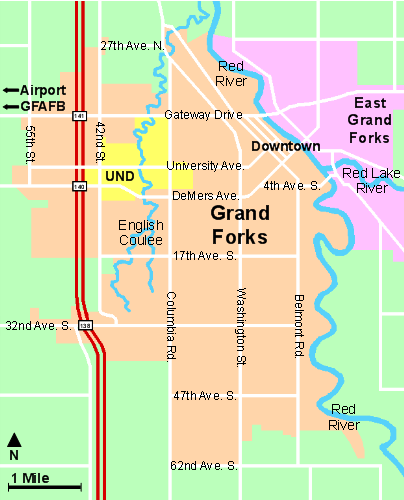
- Location within Grand Forks, North Dakota

General information
- Coordinates: 47.921613°N 97.07185°W

The Chester Fritz Library is the largest library at the University of North Dakota (UND) in Grand Forks, North Dakota. It is the largest library in the state of North Dakota and houses over two million print and non-print items. It is a designated U.S. Patent and Trademark depository of federal and state documents. The library also houses a Special Collections Department preserving unique publications, manuscripts, historical records, and genealogical resources, including a large collection of Norwegian bygdebøker (place histories).

The library is named after Chester Fritz (March 25, 1892 – July 28, 1983), a notable alumnus of UND, as is the Chester Fritz Auditorium, which is also located at UND.
