= Dakota Student =

Newspaper for the University of North Dakota

- Type: Student newspaper
- School: University of North Dakota
- Founded: 1888; 138 years ago
- Language: English
- Website: dakotastudent.com

The Dakota Student is the student-run newspaper publication of the University of North Dakota in Grand Forks, North Dakota. The newspaper was first published in 1888, but went through several short lived name changes. It grew out of a publication of the UND Adelphi Literary Society named The Oracle, which was likely a literary magazine. In 1928, it was again called The Dakota Student and has been published twice-weekly under the same name ever since. The Dakota Student is independent from the University of North Dakota, but it still receives some funding from the Board of Student Publications (BOSP). BOSP is in charge of hiring the editor-in-chief for the following academic year each spring.

The Dakota Student has a circulation of 6,500. It is distributed free of charge to students who may pick it up at several campus locations. Subscriptions are not available. The newspaper consists of approximately 15 students as editors, ad representatives, writers, podcast producer, and photographers, and is headquartered on the second level of the Memorial Union building.
