= University of North Dakota =

Public university in Grand Forks, North Dakota, US

Coordinates: 47.9222°N 97.0734°W

- Motto: Lux et Lex (Latin)
- Motto in English: "Light and Law"
- Type: Public research university
- Established: 1883; 143 years ago
- Parent institution: North Dakota University System
- Accreditation: HLC
- Academic affiliations: UArctic; Space-grant
- Endowment: $471.4 million (2025)
- President: Andrew Armacost
- Provost: Eric Link
- Students: 15,908 (fall 2026)
- Undergraduates: 11,837 (fall 2025)
- Postgraduates: 4,007 (fall 2025)
- Location: Grand Forks, North Dakota, United States
- Campus: 521 acres (2.11 km^{2}; 211 ha); Small city
- Newspaper: The Dakota Student
- Colors: UND Green,pink (not pictured) and ,White
- Nickname: Fighting Hawks
- Sporting affiliations: NCAA Division I FCS - Summit League; NCHC; MVFC
- Mascot: The Fighting Hawk
- Website: www.und.edu

The University of North Dakota (UND) is a public research university in Grand Forks, North Dakota, United States. It was established by the Dakota Territorial Assembly in 1883, six years before the establishment of the state of North Dakota.

The university has the only schools of law and medicine in the state of North Dakota. The John D. Odegard School of Aerospace Sciences was the first in the country to offer a degree in unmanned aircraft systems operation. Several national research institutions are on the university's campus including the Energy and Environmental Research Center, the School of Medicine and Health Sciences, and the USDA Human Nutrition Research Center. It is classified among "R1: Doctoral universities – very high research activity".

== History ==
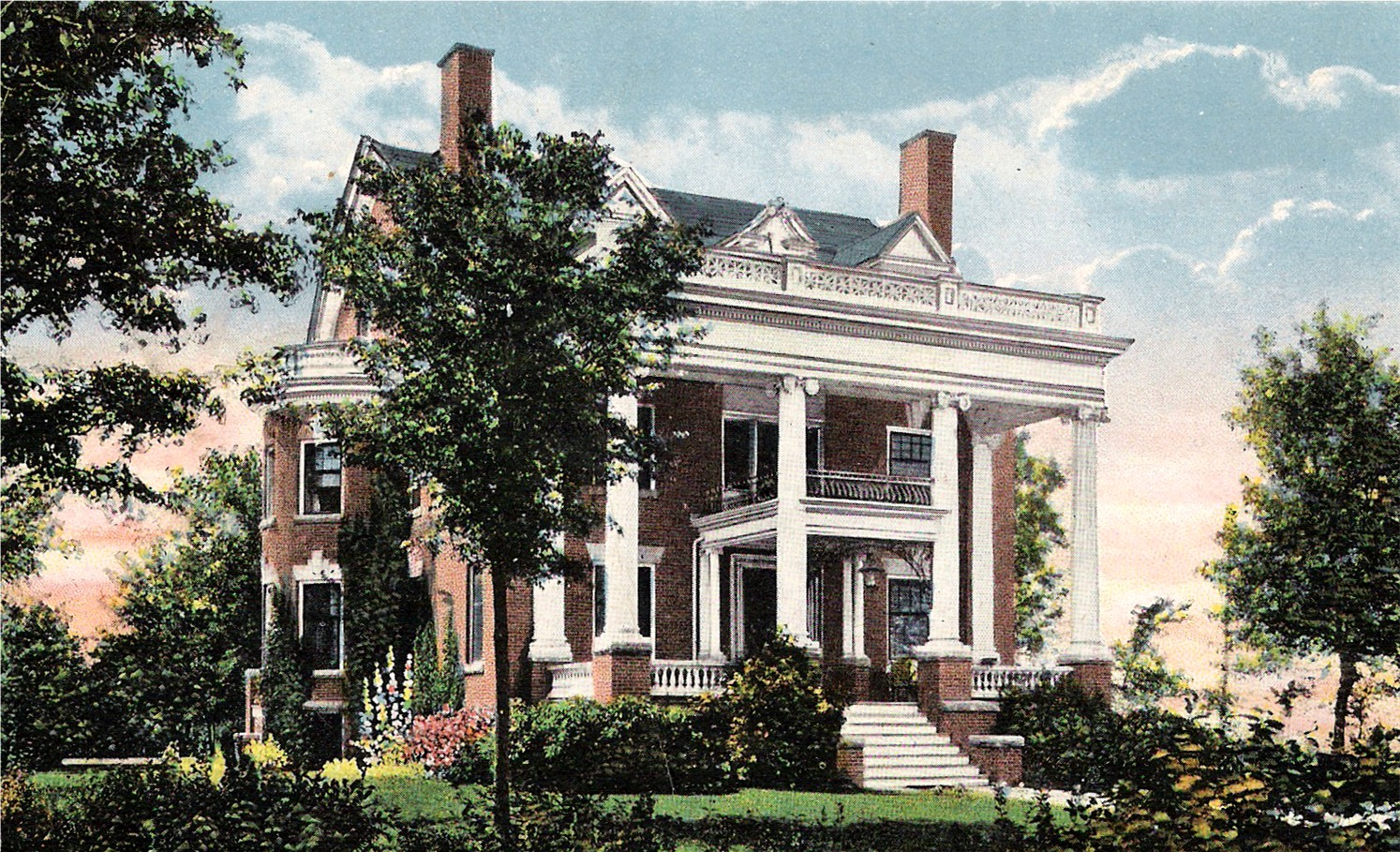
Original President's Mansion

=== Founding ===
UND was founded in 1883, six years before North Dakota became a state. UND was founded with a liberal arts foundation and expanded to include scientific research. Grand Forks native George H. Walsh submitted the bill to the Territorial Legislature of Dakota Territory that called for the new state of North Dakota's university to be in Grand Forks. The first classes were held on September 8, 1884. The first building at UND, Old Main, housed all classrooms, offices, dorm rooms, and a library. In the 1880s, UND consisted of only a few acres of property, surrounded by farms and fields, nearly two miles west of the city of Grand Forks. Students living off campus had to take a train or a horse and carriage bus, dubbed the "Black Maria", from downtown to the campus.

=== 20th century ===
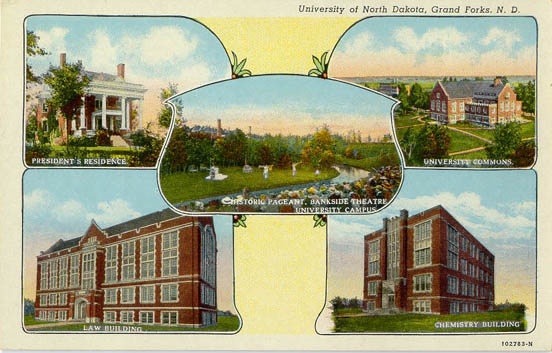
Early 20th century campus scenes

As the university grew, more buildings were constructed on campus and a trolley system was built to connect the growing university to downtown Grand Forks. However, there were several major interruptions in the life of the university. In 1918, UND was the country's hardest-hit single institution by the flu epidemic that killed 1,400 people in North Dakota alone. Later that year, classes were suspended so the campus could become an army base for soldiers during World War I. During the Great Depression, UND provided free housing to students willing to do manual labor on campus. "Camp Depression," as it was called, consisted of railroad cabooses that each housed eight male students. "Camp Depression" students did not get regular meals from the cafeteria and had to be satisfied with free leftovers. However, Grand Forks citizens often opened their homes and kitchen tables to many of these young men.

After World War II, enrollment quickly grew to more than 3,000. A large amount of housing and several academic buildings had to be built on campus. The 1950s saw the rise of the Fighting Sioux hockey tradition. In the 1960s and 1970s, many student protests occurred at UND. The largest was in May 1970 when over 1,500 students protested the Kent State shootings. In 1975, enrollment swelled to a record 8,500. The 1970s also saw the establishment of the John D. Odegard School of Aerospace Sciences at UND. During the 1980s and 1990s the university continued to grow. However, the devastating 1997 Red River flood inundated numerous buildings on campus and forced the cancellation of the remainder of the school year.

=== 21st century ===
The start of the 21st century was marked by the opening of two major venues for UND athletics. The Ralph Engelstad Arena, home of men's and women's hockey, and the Alerus Center, home of UND football, both opened in 2001. The Betty Engelstad Sioux Center opened in August 2004, and serves as home to UND volleyball and men's and women's basketball.

Millions of dollars' worth of construction and renovation projects have dotted the campus landscape. As part of a plan to improve student facilities on campus, UND constructed a Wellness Center, a parking garage, new Memorial Union, renovated library, renovated Gershman Center for graduate students, and an apartment-style housing complex. Other construction projects around campus have included a new LEED Platinum-certified alumni center, a renovated and expanded College of Education and Human Development, and an expanded Energy and Environmental Research Center. In 2016, a $124-million Medicine and Health Services building was built on the north end of campus.

In 2015, UND's economic impact on the state and region was estimated to be more than $1.4 billion a year according to the NDUS Systemwide Economic Study by the School of Economics at North Dakota State University. It was the fourth-largest employer in the state of North Dakota, after the Air Force.

In August 2021, UND became the first participant in the United States Space Force's University Partnership program.

== Campus ==
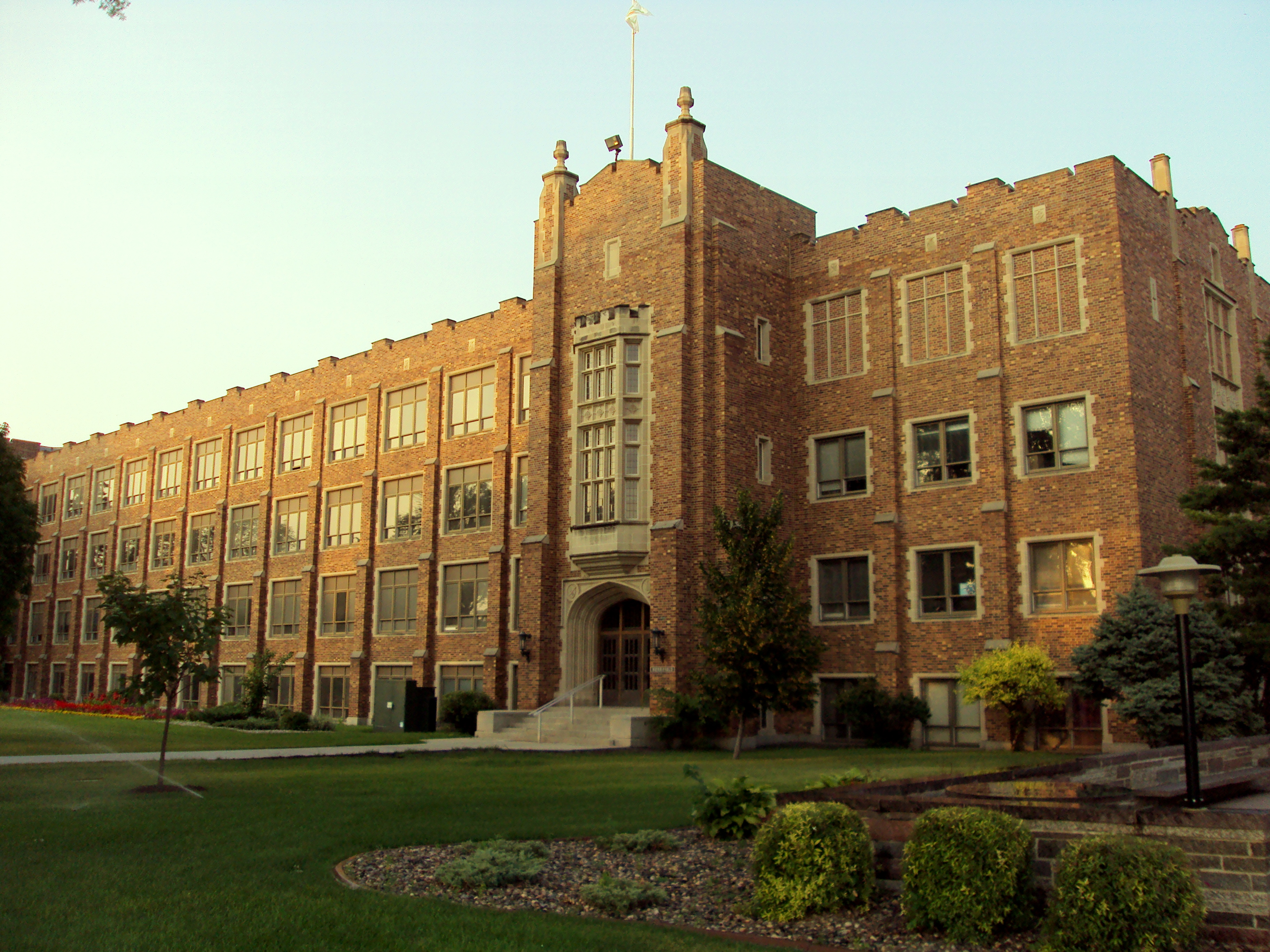
Merrifield Hall, University of North Dakota Historic District

The University of North Dakota's main campus sits in the middle of Grand Forks on University Avenue. The campus is made up of 240 buildings (6.4 million square feet) on 521 acres (2.11 km^{2}). The campus stretches roughly one and half miles from east to west and is divided by the meandering English Coulee. The western edge is bordered by Interstate 29, the eastern edge is bordered with University Park, the Grand Forks railyards sit on the south side, and the north side is marked by U.S. Highway 2 which is called Gateway Drive in Grand Forks.

At the heart of campus sits the Chester Fritz Library, the largest library in North Dakota. There are also northern and western campuses. The western part of the UND campus has modern styles of architecture. The Gorecki Alumni Center on campus is North Dakota's first LEED Platinum building. A combination of geothermal and solar panels are used to power the building.

== Academics ==
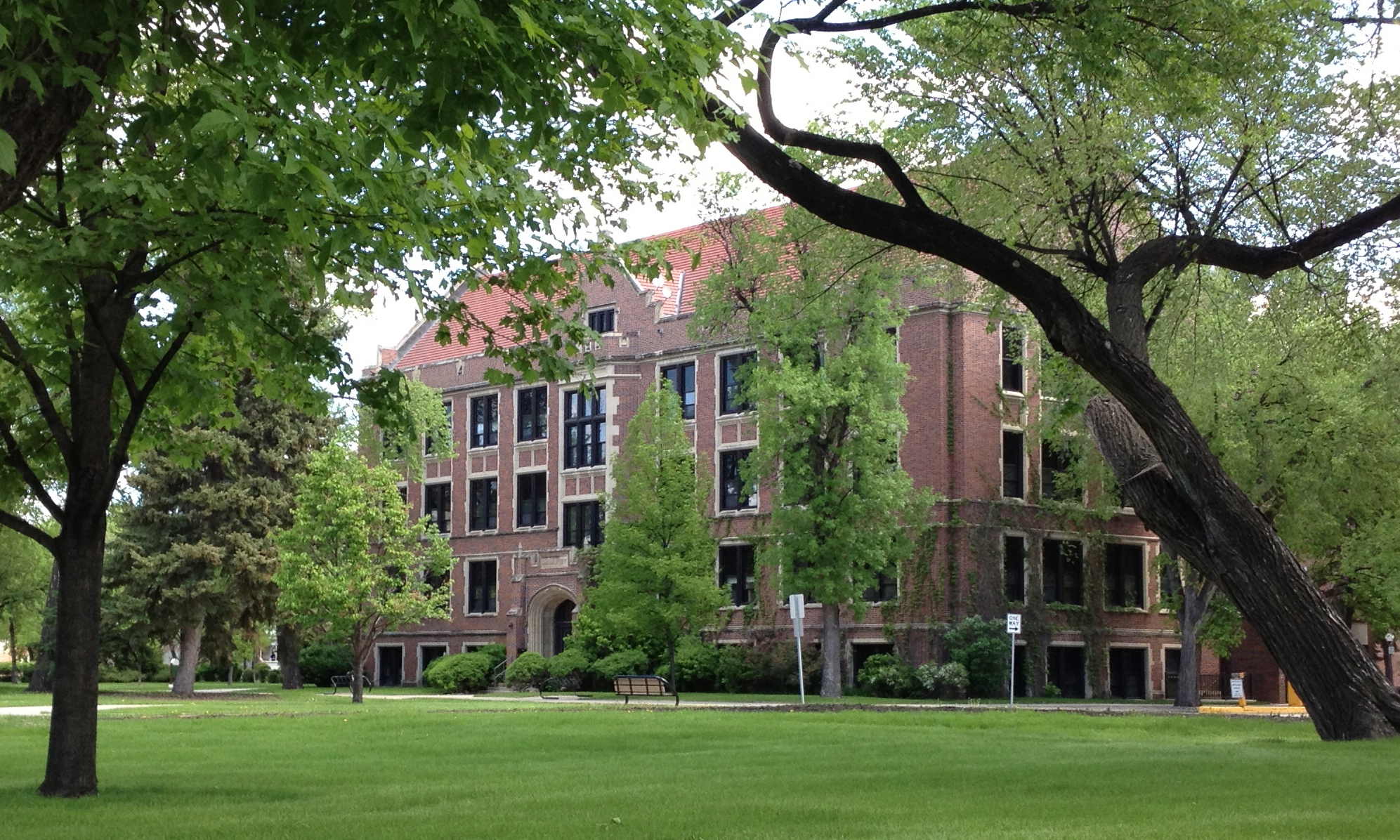
School of Law

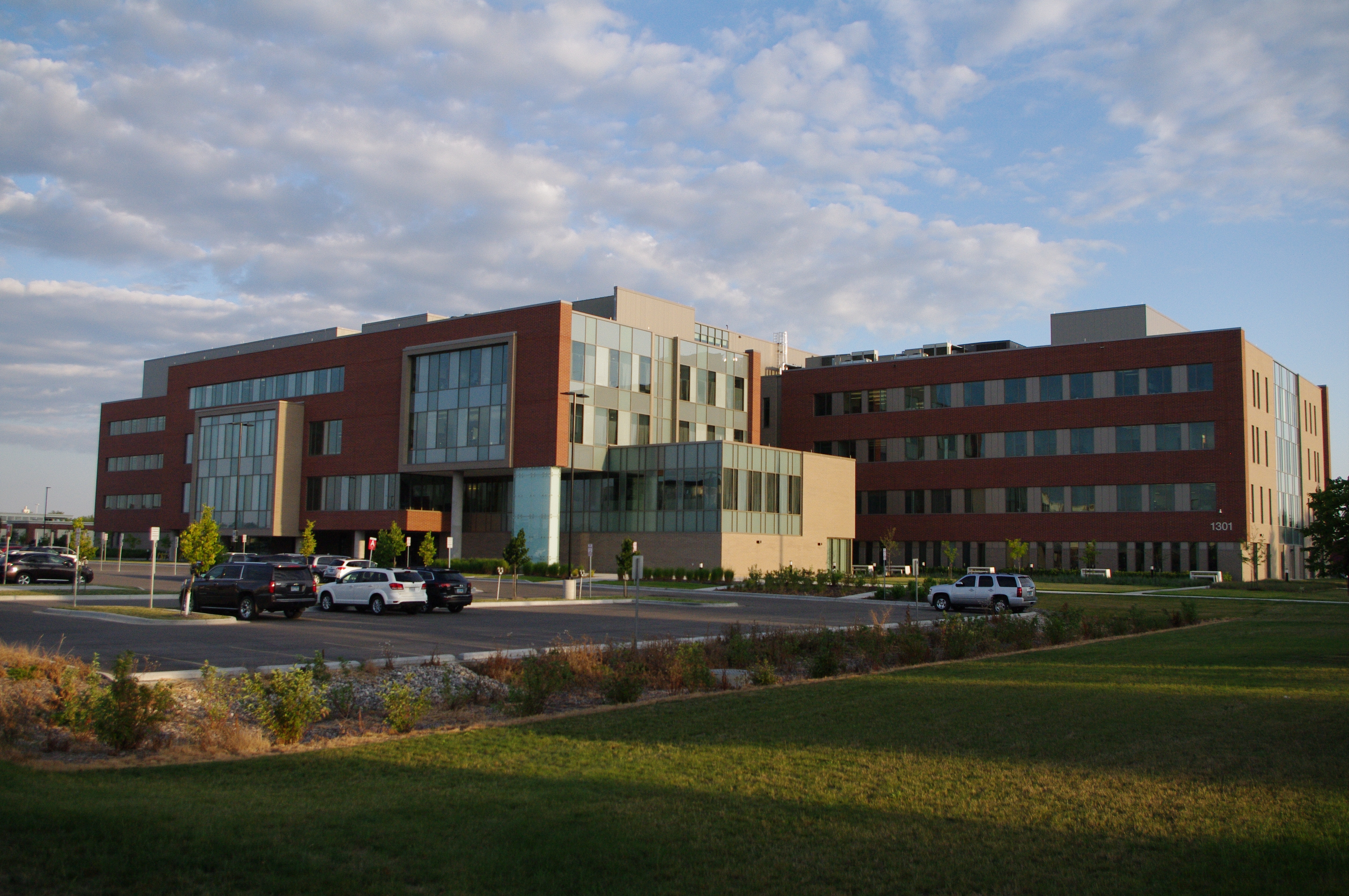
School of Medicine & Health Sciences

Academic rankings

National
- Forbes: 234
- U.S. News & World Report: 227
- WSJ/College Pulse: 401–500

UND offers more than 250+ fields of study, including 108 undergraduate majors, 69 minors, 81 master's programs, 37 doctoral programs, and two professional programs (medicine and law). UND also has an interdisciplinary program that allows students to obtain a degree in virtually any course of study. A collection of online classes and degree programs are offered for students around the nation and world. This online program has been highly ranked by US News and other leading online college rankings. On campus, academic classrooms range from smaller rooms capable of seating around 20 students to large lecture bowls capable of seating hundreds at a time. All areas have wireless access for laptops and technologically equipped classrooms enable professors to offer interactive lectures. Sanford Health, Altru Health System and Essentia Health partnered with the University of North Dakota to further medical education and simulations in a fleet of 4 trucks for North Dakota, allowing continued medical education all across the state.

The university has ten academic divisions:

- John D. Odegard School of Aerospace Sciences
- College of Arts & Sciences
- Nistler College of Business & Public Administration
- College of Education & Human Development
- College of Engineering & Mines
- School of Graduate Studies
- School of Law
- School of Medicine & Health Sciences
- College of Nursing & Professional Disciplines

=== Libraries ===
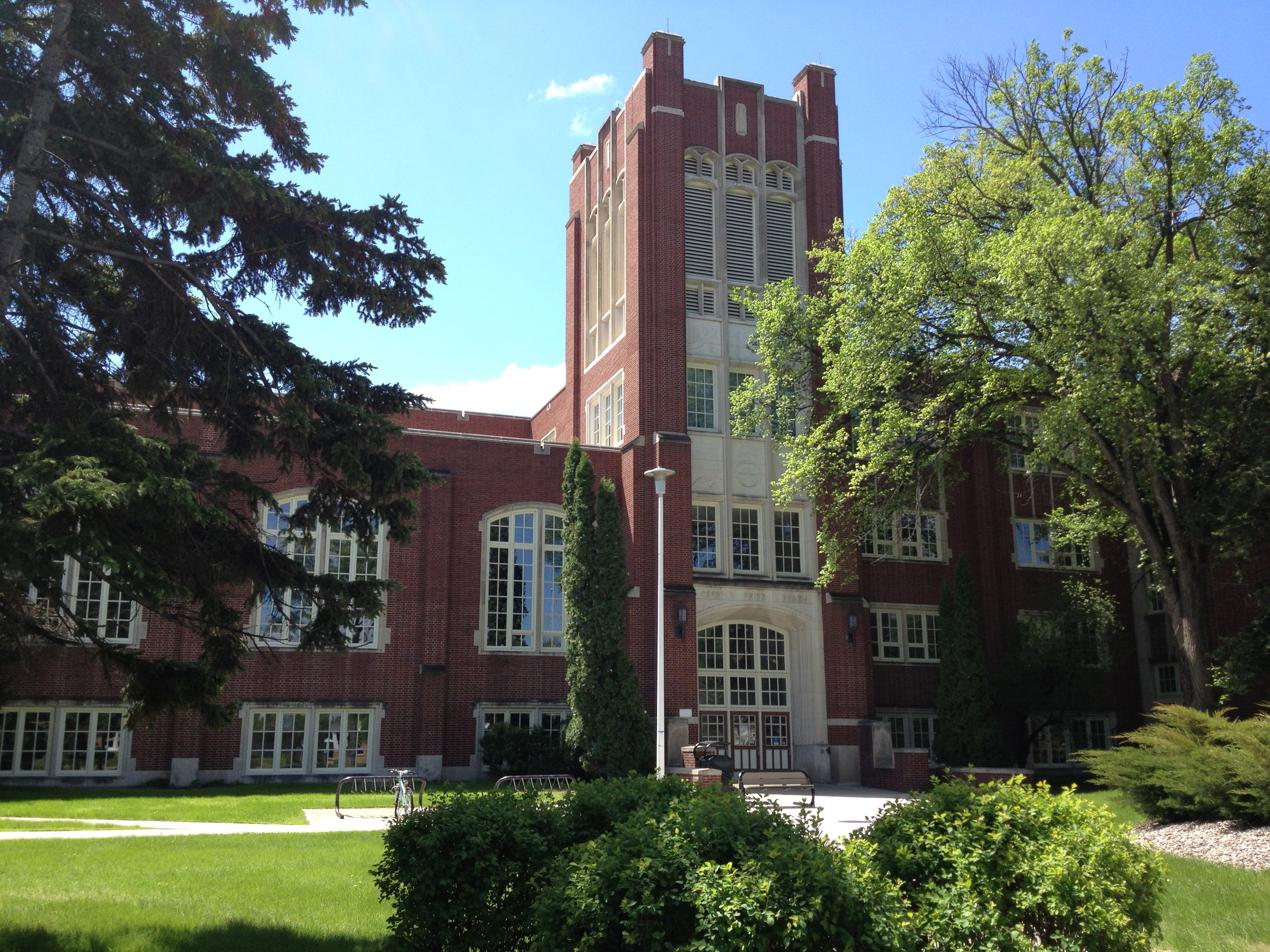
Chester Fritz Library

UND has three major libraries which, together, form the largest system of research libraries in the state of North Dakota. The Chester Fritz Library is the largest library in the state. It houses 1.6 million volumes, provides access to approximately 28,000 electronic journal subscriptions, and owns over 20,000 electronic books. It also serves as a U.S. patent and trademark depository and a government document depository. UND's special collections department is known for its genealogical resources, including Norwegian Bygdeboker, or Norwegian farm and town records. Branches of the Chester Fritz Library include the Energy and Environmental Research Library, the F.D. Holland Geology Library, and the Gordon Erickson Music Library. The School of Law operates the Thormodsgard Law Library and the School of Medicine operates the Harley E. French Library of the Health Sciences.

== Research ==
UND is classified among "R1: Doctoral universities – very high research activity". UND reports more than $192 million in annual research program expenditures and $150 million in annual external research awards. Research activity at UND focuses on health sciences, nutrition, energy and environmental protection, aerospace, and engineering. As a major component of the Red River Valley Research Corridor, UND operates many research units including the Energy and Environmental Research Center, the School of Medicine, the Institute for Energy Studies, the Center for Rural Health, the Center for Innovation, the Upper Midwest Aerospace Consortium, the Bureau of Governmental Affairs, the Bureau of Educational Services and Applied Research, and the Social Science Research Institute. The Energy and Environmental Research Center (EERC), on the eastern fringes of the UND campus, has been recognized as a leader in researching cleaner, more efficient forms of energy. The EERC operates a number of research units at UND including the National Center for Hydrogen Technology.

== Student life ==
Undergraduate demographics as of Fall 2023
Race and ethnicity	Total
White	79%
Hispanic	6%
Two or more races	5%
International student	4%
Black	3%
Asian	2%
Native American/Alaska Native	1%
Unknown	1%
Economic diversity
Low-income (Note: The percentage of students who received an income-based federal Pell grant intended for low-income students.)	18%
Affluent (Note: The percentage of students who are a part of the American middle class at the bare minimum.)	82%

Historic enrollments:
1890	24
1900	124
1910	490
1920	1,124
1930	1,765
1940	1,757
1950	2,653
1960	4,491
1970	8,129
1980	10,217
1990	11,885
2000	11,031
2010	14,194
2020	13,615

=== Student body ===
Nearly 16,000 students attend classes at the UND each year. About 39 percent of the student body is from North Dakota and the other 61 percent is made up of students from other states and 99 nations. Students can live on or off campus. On campus, there are 9 residence halls and 600 student apartment units; there is also as 12 fraternities and 6 sororities. There are over 350 student organizations at UND as well as an intramural sports program.

=== Greek life ===
The fraternity and sorority community has a rich history at the University of North Dakota. There are approximately 20 Greek houses on campus.

=== Culture ===
The North Dakota Museum of Art, the official art museum of the state of North Dakota, is in the heart of campus and offers exhibits throughout the year. The Burtness Theater and the Chester Fritz Auditorium regularly feature theater and concert events. The Ralph Engelstad Arena also features non-athletic events including concerts. The nearby city-owned Alerus Center hosts several concerts each year as well as other events. Each year, UND hosts the University of North Dakota Writers Conference with prominent American and foreign writers.

=== Media ===
The Dakota Student is UND's student newspaper.

North Dakota Quarterly, a literary journal, is edited at UND.

The North Dakota Law Review, published by the School of Law since 1924, serves as the journal of the State Bar Association of North Dakota.

The Alumni Review is published by the UND Alumni Association and Foundation.

== Athletics ==
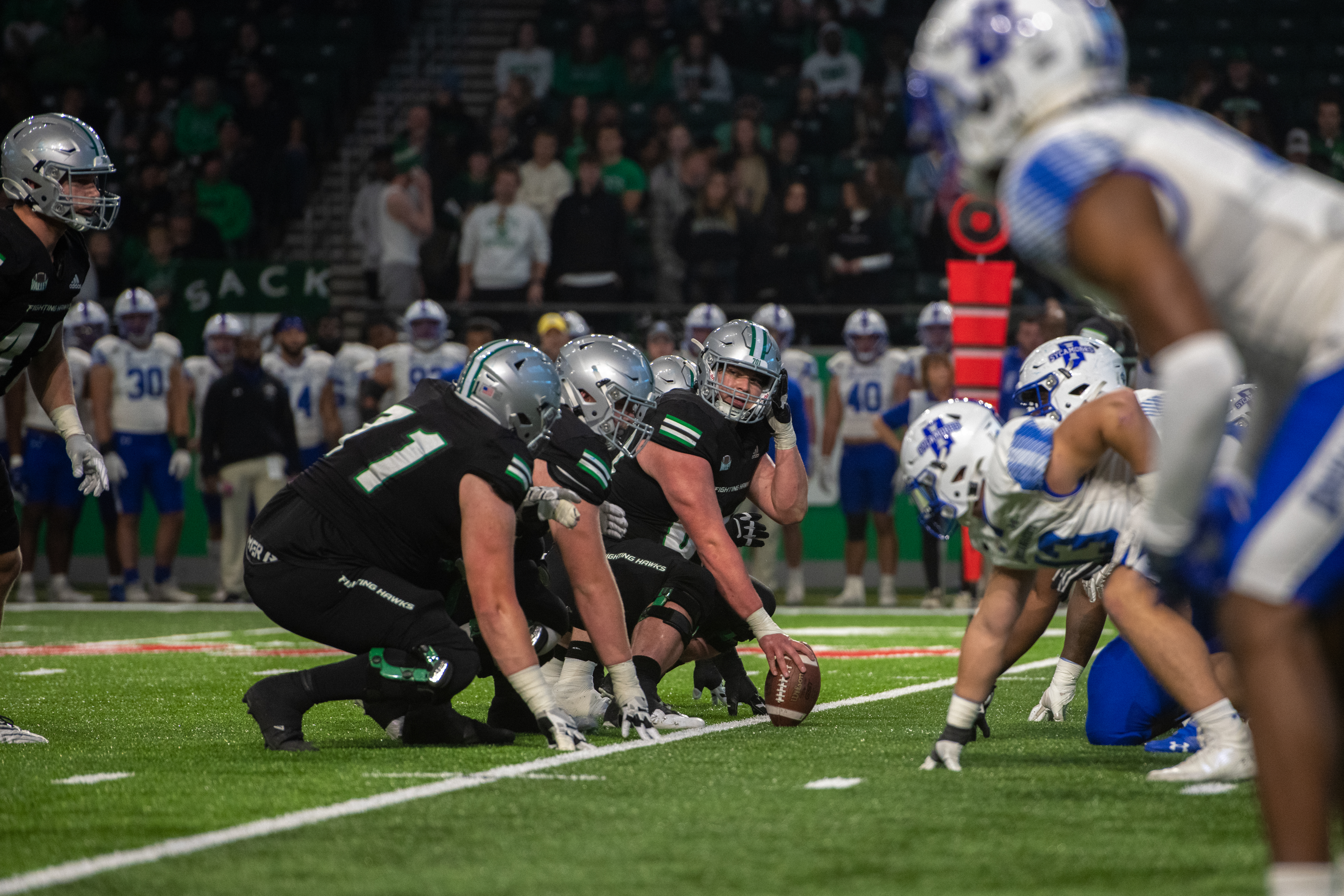
The North Dakota football team during a game against Indiana State in 2023

North Dakota's 17 athletic teams compete in the NCAA's Division I. Teams compete in the Summit League, except men's hockey, which is in the National Collegiate Hockey Conference, and the football team, which is in the Missouri Valley Football Conference (within the FCS subdivision). The men's ice hockey team has won eight national championships, has been runner-up five times and play in the Ralph Engelstad Arena.

The football team won the Division II national championship in 2001 and was the runner-up in 2003, and play at the Alerus Center. The basketball and volleyball teams play in the Betty Engelstad Sioux Center. The women's basketball team has won three national championships in 1997, 1998, and 1999 and was runner-up in 2001.

The colors of UND athletics are green and white, which were adopted in the 1920s. The university's official school colors are green and pink, representative of North Dakota's state flower, the Wild Prairie Rose; however, this combination is rarely employed outside of official or ceremonial applications. From 1904 until 1930, UND's athletic teams bore the name of the Flickertails. Afterward they were the Fighting Sioux, but were without a nickname and mascot from 2012 to 2015, in compliance with the NCAA's policy against the use of Native American nicknames. On November 18, 2015, it was announced the new nickname would be "Fighting Hawks", effective immediately. The former "Fighting Sioux" nickname controversy was later documented in the film Fighting Over Sioux.

A notable UND athletic alumnus is National Basketball Association (NBA) coach and former player Phil Jackson, widely considered one of the greatest coaches in NBA history. In addition, many UND alumni have played in the National Hockey League (NHL), including: Minnesota Wild wing Zach Parise, New Jersey Devils center Travis Zajac, Los Angeles Kings defensemen Matt Greene and Mike Commodore, Chicago Blackhawks forward and captain Jonathan Toews, Vancouver Canucks wing Brock Boeser, former NHL goalie Ed Belfour, and Washington Capitals forward T. J. Oshie.

=== Fight song ===
The school's primary fight song is "Stand Up and Cheer". Two other fight songs are "UND" and It's for You, North Dakota U (or North Dakota U), composed by Franz Rickaby in 1921.

== Notable people and alumni ==
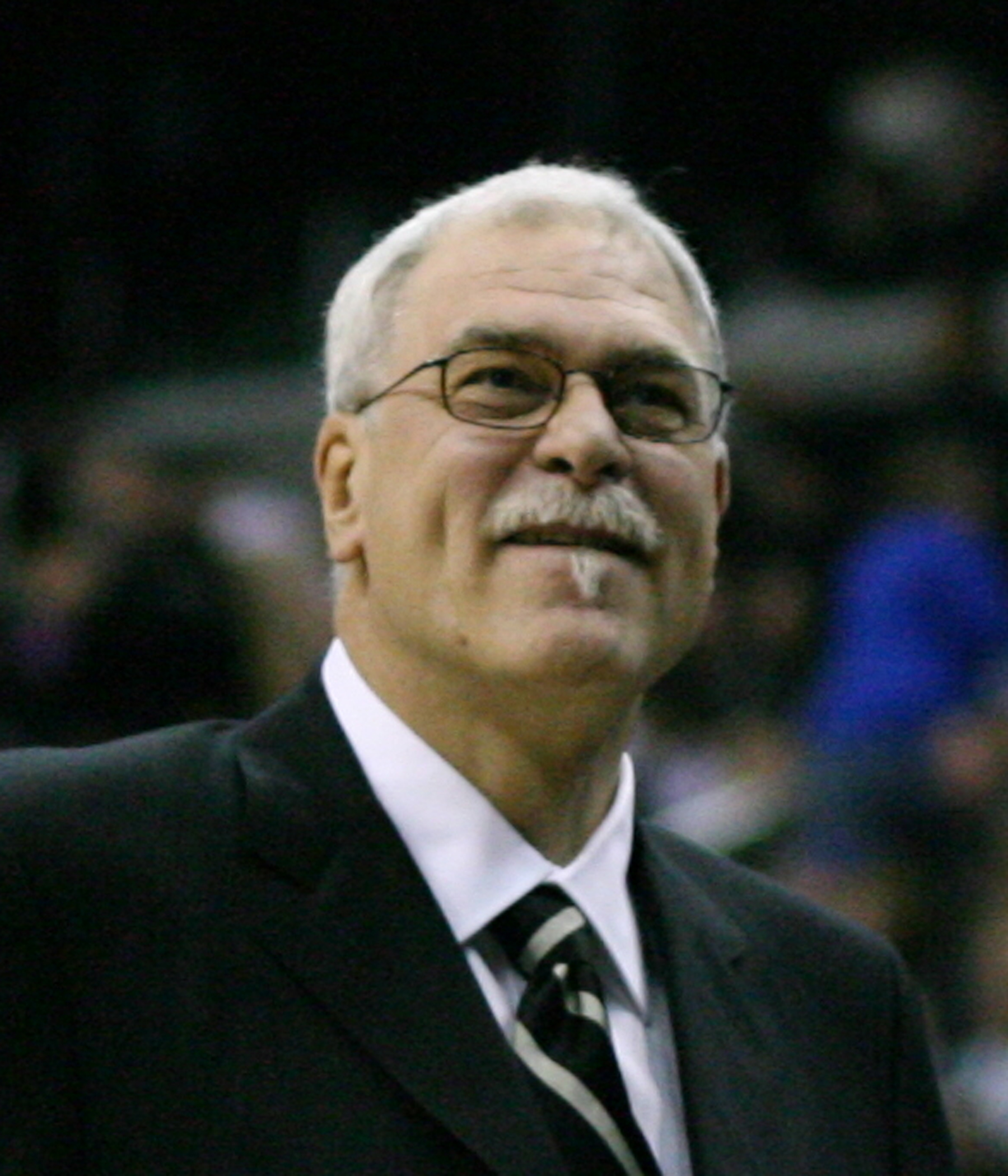
Phil Jackson

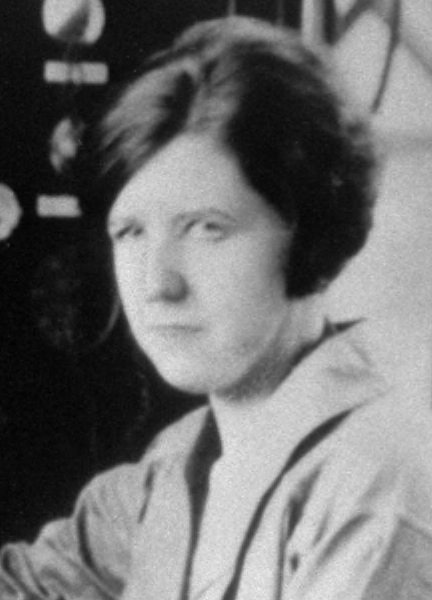
Pearl I. Young

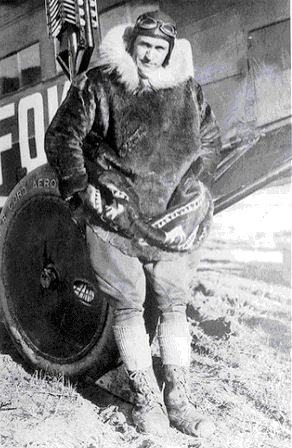
Carl Ben Eielson

Alumni of the University of North Dakota have become notable in a variety of different fields including politics and government, business, science, literature, arts and entertainment, and athletics. Nine Governors of North Dakota were educated at UND, including Fred G. Aandahl, Kelly Armstrong, Louis B. Hanna, Lynn Frazier, William Langer, John Moses, Ragnvald A. Nestos, Allen I. Olson, and Ed Schafer, who was also the US Secretary of Agriculture from 2008 to 2009. Former Deputy National Security Advisor at the White House, Mark Pfeifle is a 1997 graduate in the School of Communications. Many U.S. Senators and Representatives of North Dakota were also graduates of UND, including former Senator Byron Dorgan and former Representative Earl Pomeroy. Former House Majority Leader Dick Armey is a UND graduate. Ronald Davies, a UND graduate and former federal judge, became a part of history when he ordered the integration of Little Rock Central High School during the Civil Rights Movement. Leigh Gerdine who was president of Webster University and was awarded the National Medal of Arts in 1989. UND alumni who went on to notable careers in the business world include chairman of TNSE & president of the Winnipeg Jets hockey club Mark Chipman, current president and former CEO of Cargill Gregory R. Page, current president and CEO of the Buffalo Wild Wings restaurant chain Sally J. Smith, current CEO of Forum Communications William C. Marcil, former Las Vegas casino owner and UND philanthropist Ralph Engelstad, and former CEO of American Skandia and founder of WealthVest Marketing Wade Dokken. Former Canadian Football League player and founder of Golden Star Resources, Dave Fennell. Founder and chairman of Nygård International, Peter Nygård.

In the realm of science, notable UND alumni include important contributor to information theory Harry Nyquist, pioneer aviator Carl Ben Eielson, Arctic explorer Vilhjalmur Stefansson, engineer and NASA astronaut Karen L. Nyberg, and leading NASA manager John H. Disher. Pearl I. Young, a UND graduate in 1919, became the first female technical employee at NASA (then NACA) in 1922, her contributions to the agency resulted in a theater at NASA Langley in 1995.

Alumni who have become notable through literature include the Pulitzer Prize-winning playwright and author Maxwell Anderson, Rhodes scholar and poet Thomas McGrath, essayist and journalist Chuck Klosterman, and novelist Jon Hassler. UND graduates have become editors of major magazines: Carroll Eugene Simcox of The Living Church, former Ebony editor Era Bell Thompson and former LIFE editor Edward K. Thompson. Alumni who have become notable in arts and entertainment include actor Sam Anderson and America's Next Top Model winner Nicole Linkletter.

Former UND students who have gone on to notable careers in athletics include former NBA player and coach and former president of the New York Knicks, Phil Jackson, 1980 Winter Olympics "Miracle on Ice" hockey player Dave Christian, NHL players Ed Belfour and Zach Parise, and professional football players Jim Kleinsasser and Dave Osborn. As of the 2018–19 season, more than 20 former UND players are in the NHL and more than 100 former players have played in the NHL.
