= Chester Fritz Auditorium =

Performance facility at the University of North Dakota

Chester Fritz Performing Arts Center
- "The Fritz"
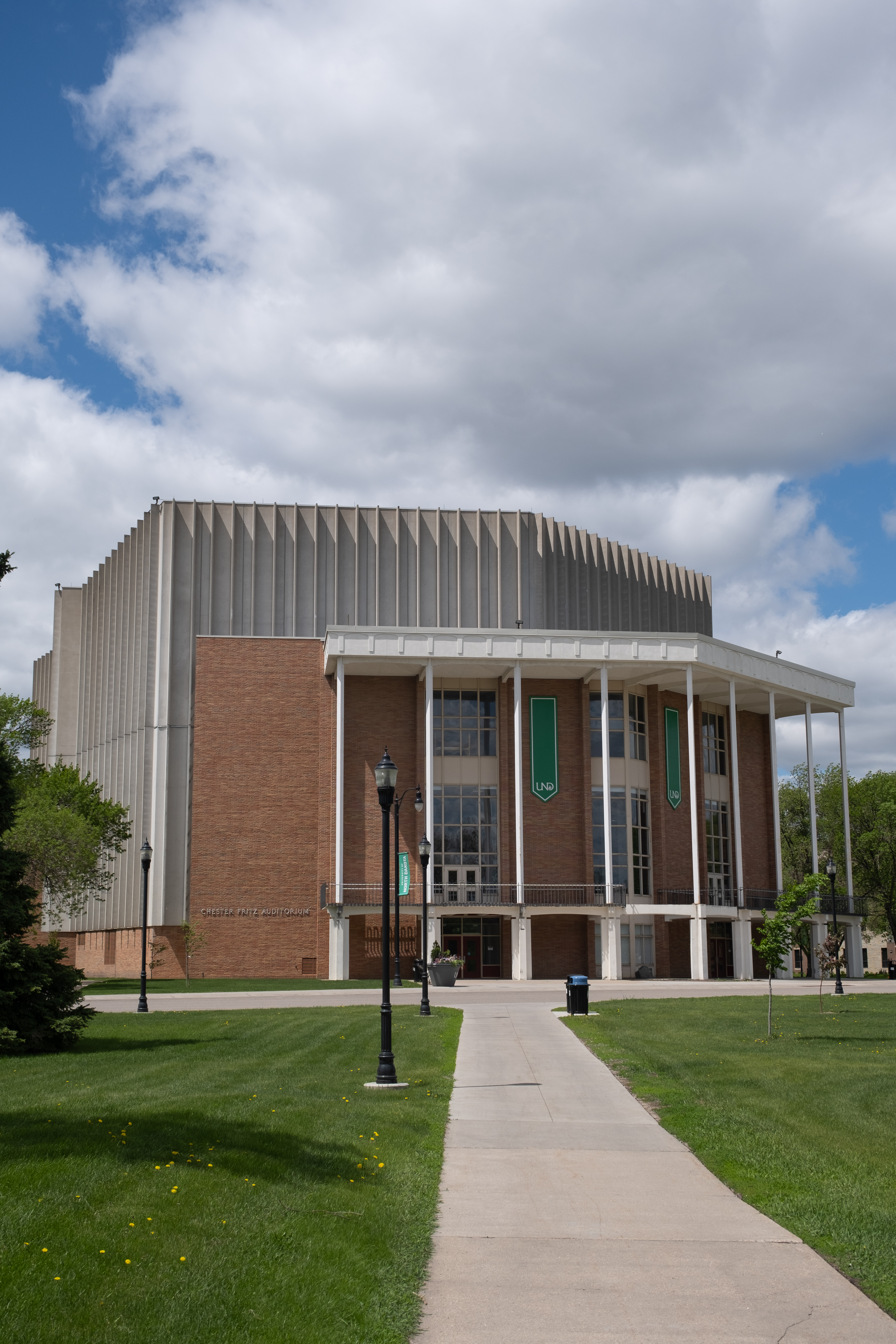

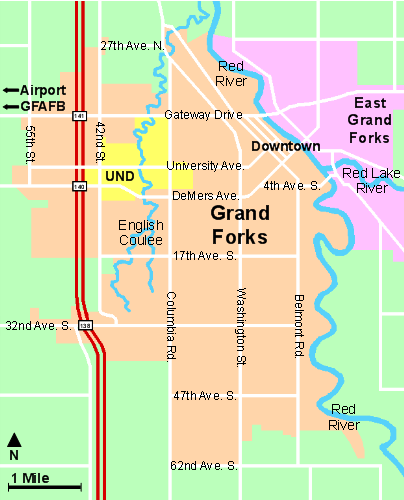
- Location of Chester Fritz Performing Arts Center
- Address: 3475 University Avenue
- Location: Grand Forks, North Dakota, 58202
- Coordinates: 47°55′18″N 97°04′44″W
- Owner: University of North Dakota
- Capacity: 2,384

Construction
- Cost: $3 million

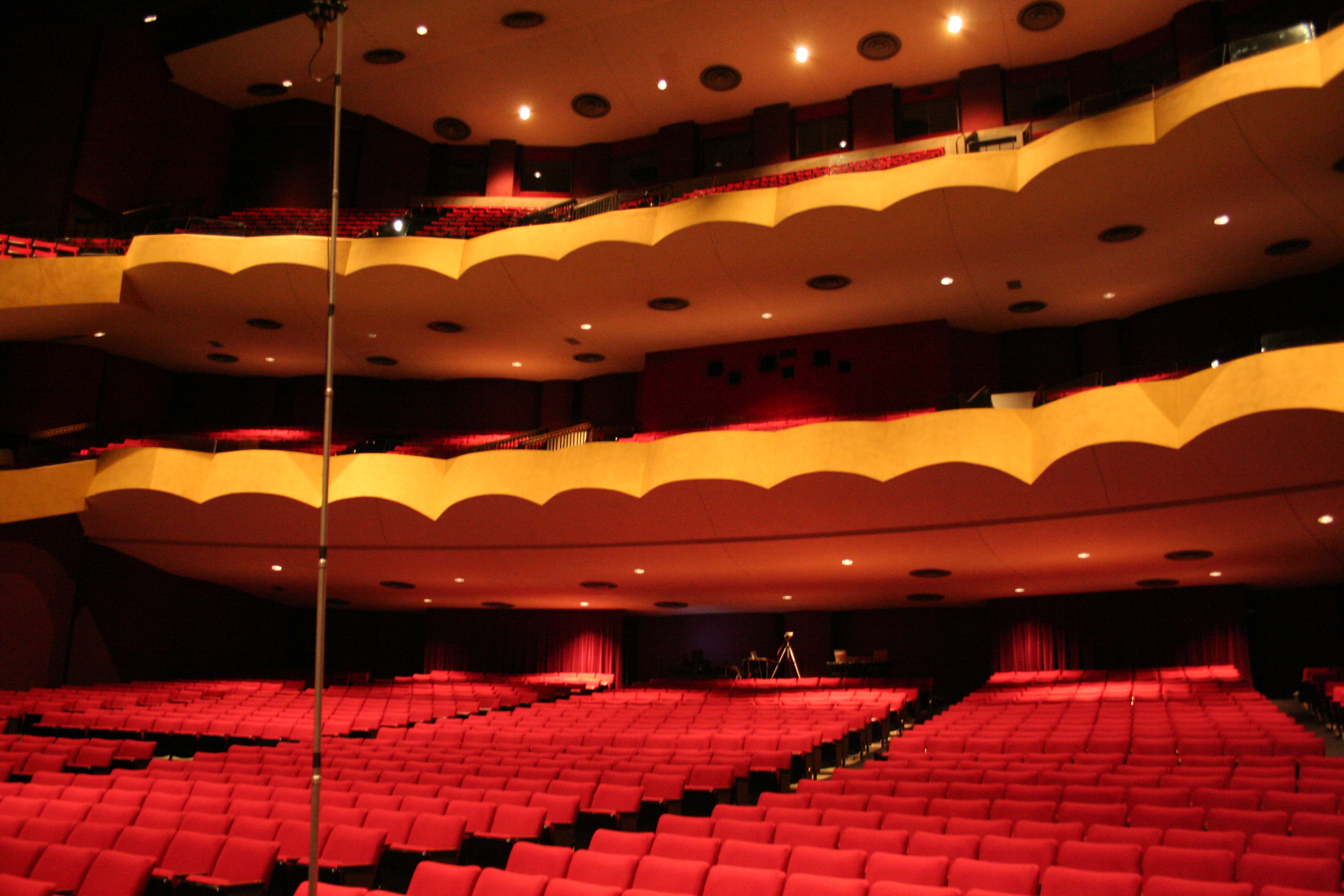
Interior of the Chester Fritz Performing Arts Center

The Chester Fritz Performing Arts Center (CFPAC), formerly known as the Chester Fritz Auditorium, is a performance facility on the campus of the University of North Dakota (UND) located in the city of Grand Forks, North Dakota.

"The Fritz," as it is commonly known, has a maximum capacity of 2,384 and is used for many events including concerts, dance recitals, and popular Broadway musicals. The auditorium also plays host to university events including some commencement ceremonies, lectures, and conferences. The building measures 85 feet (26 m) in height and the facade is constructed mainly of brick and pre-cast concrete sections. It sits on the banks of the English Coulee, which meanders its way through the UND campus.

Chester Fritz (March 25, 1892 – July 28, 1983), a notable alumnus of UND, gave the university $1 million in 1965 for the construction of a "distinctive auditorium" on the campus. The finished auditorium cost $3 million, with additional funds received from the state of North Dakota and private donations. The Chester Fritz Library, the main library at UND, is also named after Chester Fritz. The auditorium was listed on the National Register of Historic Places in 2023.

== Related Reading ==
- Fritz, Chester and Dan Rylance (1982) Ever Westward to the Far East: The Story of Chester Fritz (Grand Forks: University of North Dakota)
