= Skandiabanken =

Swedish online bank

Skandiabanken (founded on October 3, 1994) is a Swedish online bank owned by Skandia. It has its headquarters in Stockholm, and conducts most of its business over the internet and via telephone.

The Norwegian branch of Skandiabanken, founded on April 27, 2000, was separated in 2015. Since November 6, 2017, it is known as Sbanken.

In late 2007, the Danish branch of the company was sold to Eik Bank Danmark.

== See also ==
- List of banks in Sweden
