= John D. Odegard School of Aerospace Sciences =

School within the University of North Dakota

Coordinates: 47°55′18″N 97°05′07″W

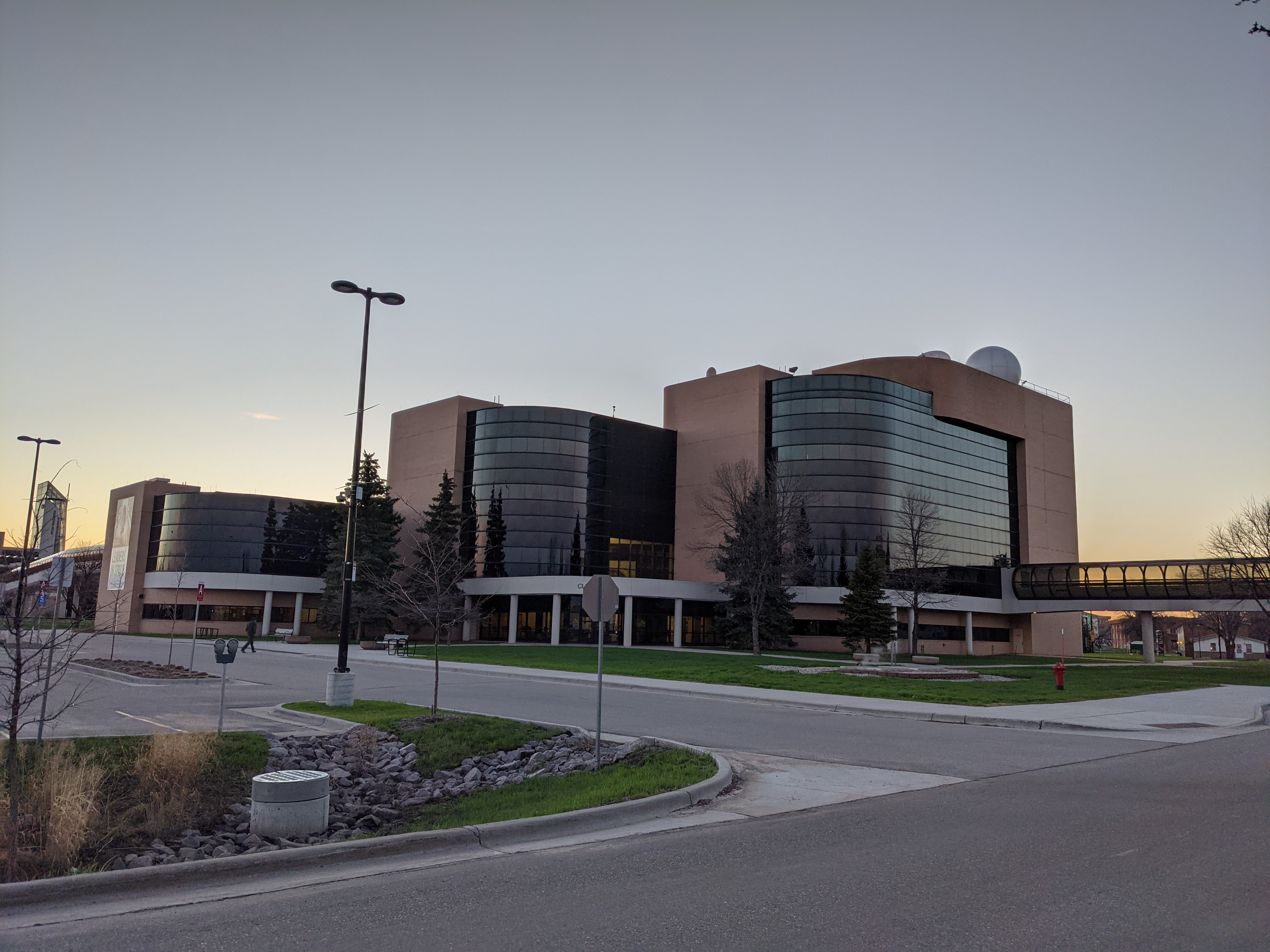
- John D. Odegard School of Aerospace Sciences - Clifford Hall
- Established: 1968
- Dean: Robert Kraus
- Students: 2,100+
- Location: Grand Forks, North Dakota, USA
- Website: aero.und.edu

The John D. Odegard School of Aerospace Sciences (UND Aerospace) is a multidisciplinary college within the University of North Dakota (UND) in Grand Forks, North Dakota. The school was formed in 1968. The majority of the school's fleet of over 120 aircraft is based at nearby Grand Forks International Airport and is the largest fleet of civilian flight training aircraft in North America. UND Aerospace also operates a flight training center at Phoenix–Mesa Gateway Airport in Mesa, Arizona. Today, the school has many aerospace-related programs including commercial aviation (fixed wing and rotorcraft), Unmanned aircraft systems operations, air traffic control, airport management, Space Studies, Computer Science, Atmospheric Sciences, and Earth System Science & Policy. Currently, the school has over 500 faculty and 2,000 students making it the second largest of UND's degree-granting colleges. The present dean of the school is Robert Kraus.

== History ==
John D. Odegard (1941–1998) started the program in 1968 with only two donated aircraft and one other faculty member besides himself. Over time, the program was able to purchase more aircraft and grew dramatically in the number of students enrolled. In 1982, the Center for Aerospace Sciences was established as a result of the growth of UND’s atmospheric research and aviation education programs. In 1997, as part of a 30th anniversary celebration, the school took on its present name in honor of its founder.

The founder of the aviation program at UND, John D. Odegard, logged over 10,000 hours of flight time in his life and was licensed for commercial flight and instrument operations. He was type-rated in Cessna Citations, Learjet, and Beechjet, as well as being a certificated flight instructor (CFI) and certified examiner for commercial, instrument, tailwheel, multiengine, and Citation type-ratings. Having broken the sound barrier in the Concorde (as a passenger) and having flown as a crop-duster to help pay for college, Odegard was no stranger to the varied envelopes of flight. He was quite familiar with the many aspects of aviation and his vision for a well-rounded school that trains pilots in all aspects of flight helped the aviation program at UND become what it is today. Odegard died of cancer in 1998 at the age of 57. He is buried in Grand Forks, less than a mile away from the UND campus.

== Facilities ==
UND Aerospace maintains facilities including 360 degree air traffic control tower simulators, a remote learning classroom, and a wireless network that is available throughout the entire aerospace complex on the main campus and in any of the buildings at the airport. Funding for additional buildings has already been secured.

=== Main campus ===
All School of Aerospace Sciences facilities on the main UND campus are connected by a series of skyways. Buildings here include Odegard Hall, Clifford Hall, Ryan Hall, and Streibel Hall. In July 2016 a fifth building, Robin Hall opened to accommodate the school's growing research and teaching enterprise in unmanned aerial systems. The complex also includes several other buildings including the Center for Entrepreneurship and the Skalicky Tech Incubator.

Odegard Hall is the main building in the School of Aerospace Sciences complex on campus and was the first of the four buildings to be built. The building houses classrooms, a portion of faculty offices for the Department of Aviation, the main office of the School of Aerospace Sciences, a full-motion spatial disorientation simulator, an altitude chamber (used to teach flight students about the effects of high altitude on the human body, especially hypoxia), as well as other specialized laboratories. The centerpiece of the main floor is the 200-seat Arthur P. Anderson Atmospherium Planetarium and Lecture Bowl. The second floor hosts many of the School's administrative offices and the Regional Weather Information Center. Connected to Odegard Hall by a large, enclosed breezeway is Streibel Hall, which formerly housed UND's Computer Science department. Today, Streibel hall is mostly utilized for storage and occasional regional law enforcement training.

Clifford Hall houses the Atmospheric Sciences department, the Space Studies Department, the Department of Earth Systems Science & Policy, the UAS Center administrative offices, the Upper Midwest Aerospace Consortium, and the Scientific Computing Center. Dedicated in May 1992, it was the second addition to the aerospace complex on the Main Campus. A 260-seat auditorium with full audio-visual and recording capability is located on the second floor. The first floor hosts much of UND Aerospace's computing power as well as UND's 360-degree visual Air Traffic Control Tower simulator. Centered on top of Clifford Hall is UND's Polarimetric Doppler Radar used by the Atmospheric Sciences Department.

Ryan Hall is home to UND's air traffic control faculty and UND's 16+ flight simulators, including FAA Level 6 flight training devices for the Garmin G-1000 equipped Piper Archer and Piper Seminole aircraft. Two Alsim jet training devices are used to provide a basic introduction to turbine engine systems as well as to prepare graduate students for the pace of airline training. In addition, there are various simple instrument panel trainers, a basic instrument simulator computer based instruction (CBI) lab, an FAA Knowledge Test Center, and a pair of air traffic control tower simulators. Finally, Ryan Hall is home to the remote classroom and several state of the art digital classrooms.

=== Airport ===
The Grand Forks International Airport campus consists of the dispatch office where students request aircraft and are assigned to practice areas. The dispatch office opens out onto Bravo Ramp where the Seminoles, Cessnas, Decathlons, and some Archers are based. It also connects directly to the display hangar where aircraft not in use are sometimes kept. There are 11 heated hangars lining Bravo and Charlie Ramp all owned by UND. These hangars are capable of housing up to 130 aircraft. South of Charlie Ramp is UND's newest hangar, which houses dispatch, flight planning, and general hangar space for the helicopter department. North of Charlie Ramp is UND's Flight Operations Administrative building, which contains offices for the Standards and Publications Departments, Administrative offices, and a cafeteria.

=== UND-Phoenix ===
The UND Aerospace Foundation operates a UND Aerospace Foundation Flight Training Center in Phoenix, AZ. The center is located at the Phoenix-Mesa Gateway Airport and the flight school is located on the Chandler-Gilbert Community College campus. UND-Phoenix has an accelerated program where students can become a CFI and get FAA credentials in less than a year. There is also a two-year program. Rex Ginder is the associate director in Phoenix.

== Aircraft ==
UND currently operates a fleet of 123 aircraft including 100 airplanes, 7 helicopters, and 9 unmanned aerial vehicles (UAV's). The majority of these aircraft are based at Grand Forks International Airport with the remainder located at the two satellite campuses in the United States. The fleet is primarily made up of 93 Piper Archer equipped with the Garmin G1000 NXi glass cockpit avionics suite. Currently the Archers are used to teach students in obtaining certification as a private pilot and additional training for the instrument rating as well as the more advanced Certified Flight Instructor (CFI) and Certified Flight Instructor - Instrument (CFII) courses. UND Aerospace took delivery of its first Skyhawk, tail number N511ND, in 2008 as a replacement of the earlier Piper PA-28 Warrior III fleet. UND Aerospace always tries to provide new, technologically advanced aircraft to its students. UND modified its fleet to include the Cessna 172 aircraft after Piper discontinued producing new Piper Warrior III's. UND later replaced the Cessna 172 fleet with the Piper Archer TX in 2016 as a part of their fleet renewal program.

Rounding out the fleet, UND Aerospace's Flying Team practices in 3 Cessna 150's. These aircraft were the original aircraft used for pilot training by Odegard. Aerobatic and spin training is provided in 2 American Champion Super Decathlons. Contract students from Air China fly both of the University's King Air aircraft, the BE-90B. Lastly, the Atmospheric Sciences Department employs a Cessna Citation II for weather and atmospheric research.

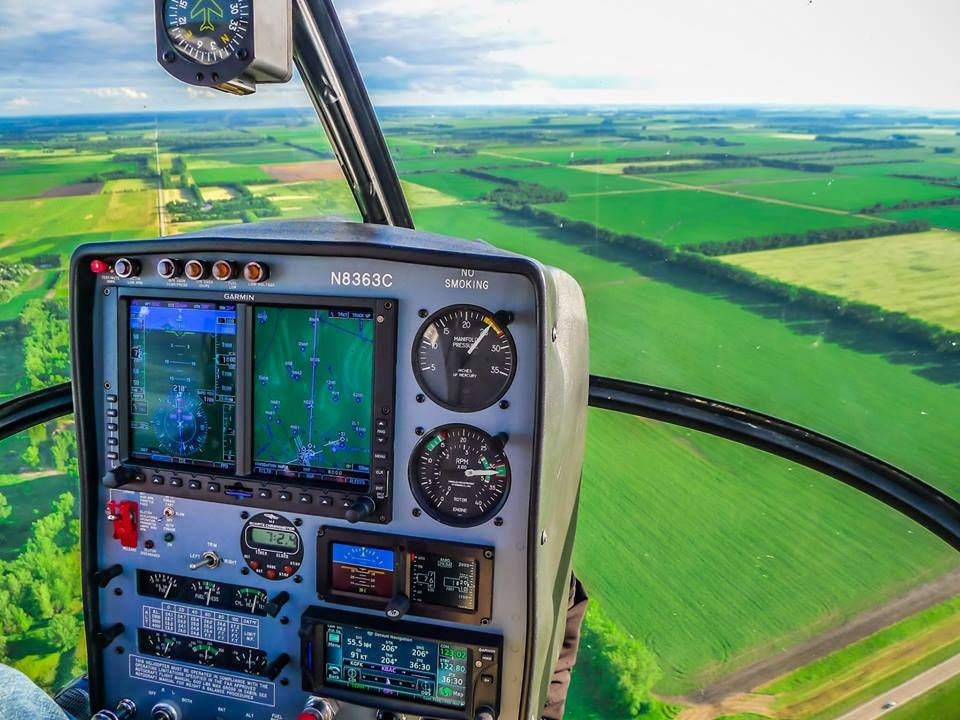
An S-300 helicopter equipped with a Garmin G500H glass display proceeds on a test flight on its way to supplemental type certification from the FAA.

Students seeking helicopter training train in one of 6 Sikorsky 300C two-seat helicopters. In 2013 UND Aerospace developed a Supplemental Type Certificate that allowed the installation of Garmin Avionics G500H suite. UND Aerospace is the current holder for the STC. Having updated avionics allows student to train from Private pilot, Instrument, Commercial, CFI and CFII in the same airframe.

In January 2017 UND Aerospace took delivery of a Robinson R44 Cadet. Equipped with Garmin G500H, GTN 750, and GTX345 it is ideally set up for SFAR transition training as well as Instrument and Instrument Instructor training.

As of September 2011, the Unmanned Aircraft Systems (UAS) department employs nine aircraft for various missions including three CropCam, two Ravan, two Scan Eagle, one Draganflyer, and one Telemaster UAV's. Along with the aircraft, the university provides realistic ground training in UAV flying with its two Reaper, one Predator, and one Scan Eagle flight training devices (FTD).

Past aircraft have included models from various manufactures. Prior to the arrival of the Cessna 172 Skyhawks, UND's primary fleet consisted of a combination of glass and conventional-gauge Piper Warrior IIIs, which were the primary workhorses of the UND fleet from 1989 to 2010. The last conventional-gauge Warrior was retired in March 2010. On March 28, 2008, UND Aerospace took delivery of a new Cessna Citation Mustang business jet, but sold it in order to purchase a second King Air The school also was given a Piper PA-12 Supercruiser that was overhauled to provide students another aircraft to practice tailwheel landings.

In April 2014, UND announced that it would begin phasing out their fleet of Cessna 172 Skyhawks in favor of the Piper Archer, marking a move back to the Piper Cherokee platform for UND's primary flight training. UND's first Piper Archer, N718ND, was delivered in November 2016 featuring the new G1000 NXi avionics suite.

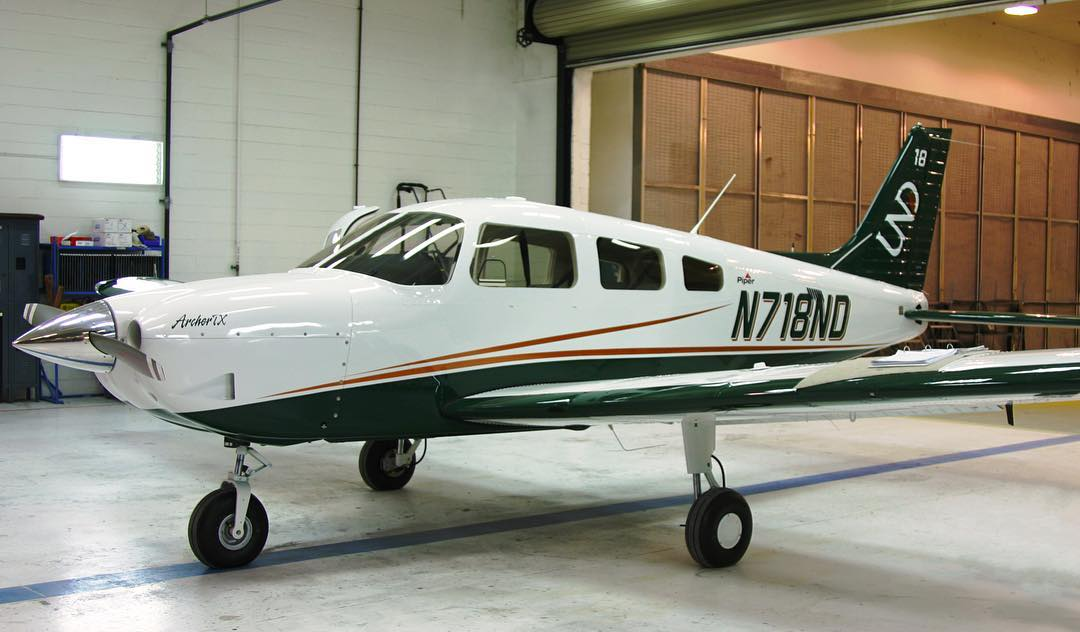
The first UND Piper Archer produced. UND has a fleet order of 112 aircraft, which includes both Piper Archers and Piper Seminoles.

The current UND Aerospace fleet includes the following aircraft (as of July 2021):

- 93 Piper Archer (4 Seats)
- 1 Cessna 172S (4 Seats)
- 15 Piper Seminole (4 Seats)
- 3 Cessna 150 (2 Seats)
- 3 Beech King Air 90 (9 Seats)
- 2 Decathlon (2 Seats)
- 1 Piper CubCrafters CC18-180 Amphibious
- 5 Robinson R44 Cadet (2 seats)

Historical UND Aerospace Fleet has included the following aircraft:

- Aerospatiale (Socata) TB-9 Tampico
- American Champion Super Decathlon
- Beechcraft Baron BE58
- Beechcraft Beechjet 400A
- Beechcraft King Air C90-GTi
- Beechcraft King Air (Owned by local business)
- Beechcraft Premier I (Owned by local business)
- Beechcraft 1900
- Bell 206 BIII
- Cessna 172 Amphibious
- Cessna Citation I
- Cessna Citation II
- Cessna Grand Caravan Amphibious (Owned by local business)
- Cessna Mustang
- Cirrus SR-20
- Diamond Aircraft A-1 Katana DA20-A1
- Diamond Aircraft C-1 Katana DA20-C1
- Diamond Aircraft Katana Motorglider DV20-A1
- Douglas DC-3 (Delivered October, 1968)
- Douglas DC-8-72 (Owned and operated with NASA Dryden Research Facility) (N817NA)
- Piper Archer PA28-181
- Piper Arrow PA28-200
- Piper Seminole PA44-180
- Piper Cadet PA28-161
- Piper SuperCub PA-18-150
- Piper Cheyenne II PA-31T
- Piper Warrior III PA28-161
- Robinson R44
- Sikorsky 300C (2 Seats)
- Schweizer Glider SGU 2-22CK

== Radiotelephony ==
University of North Dakota aircraft have obtained International Civil Aviation Organization (ICAO) company and telephony designators (call signs) for use in air traffic control (ATC) operations. The U.S. Department of Transportation, Federal Aviation Administration, Order JO7340.2E lists the three letter company designator as NDU. The company designator, together with a flight/trip number, serves as the aircraft identification for the ATC system in several situations. The company designator and flight/trip number are used instead of the aircraft registration number for ATC security and operational purposes and may be used for the international telecommunications service when its use is advantageous.

The telephony designator (used instead of phonetically pronouncing the three letter company designator associated with the aircraft call sign) is usually assigned at the same time as the ICAO three letter designator. The call sign, together with a flight/trip number, is the aircraft identification for radio voice communications with air traffic personnel. The call sign for UND aircraft is "Sioux".

== Flying Team ==
The University of North Dakota School of Aerospace Sciences is a member school of the National Intercollegiate Flying Association (NIFA). NIFA is a professional organization that provides a forum of competition and learning for aviation students from colleges all around the United States. In the fall of each year, UND Flying Team students participate in the Region V Safety and Flight Evaluation Conference (SAFECON). The regional SAFECON is hosted each year by one of the five member schools located in the adjacent states of Iowa, Minnesota, North Dakota, South Dakota and Wisconsin. Within Region V, the UND Flying Team consistently dominates the total School Ranking Overall calculated from the 13 various categories in which competition points are awarded.

Likewise, a national SAFECON takes place in the spring season of the new year. Generally, the top three performing teams in each of the regional SAFECONs from the prior year receive an invitation to attend the national SAFECON. Similar to a regional SAFECON, the national SAFECON is hosted by a member school that has been selected among the schools that have submitted an application to host. The host school also receives an automatic invitation to participate in the national SAFECON, regardless of their performance in the regional SAFECON.

Since 1981, when the first complete official competition results of the national SAFECON were recorded, the UND Flying Team has won the NIFA National Championship Trophy a total of 17 times over the course of the last 34 years. Among these 17 championships, the UND Flying Team has recorded a number of multi-year streaks of consecutive championship wins that no other school has been able to match. The first and longest streak was an almost unstoppable seven year championship dynasty from 1985 to 1991. Additionally, since 1985 the UND Flying Team has recorded nine second-place finishes, three third-place finishes, and a fourth-place and sixth-place finish in 1993 and 1992 respectively. Prior to the 1986 national SAFECON, only the top performing national team champions were recorded. The placement of the runner-up teams in those prior years is not available.

== See also ==
- Asteroid 156939 Odegard, named after John D. Odegard
