= Pearl I. Young =

Physicist, technical editor

Pearl Young
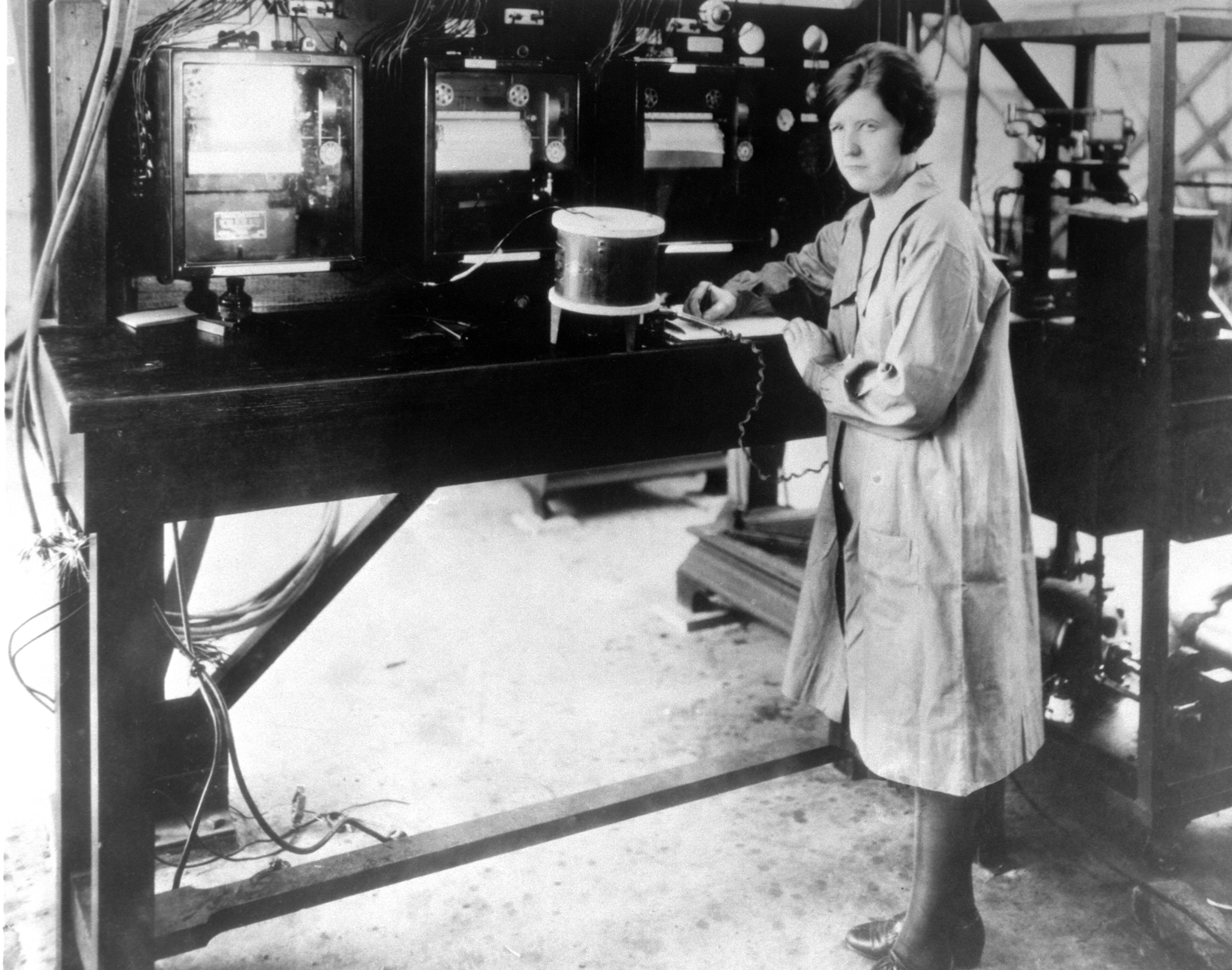
- In NACA's Langley Instrument Research Laboratory, circa 1929
- Education: University of North Dakota
- Known for: early female physicist, technical editor at NACA, historical research on Octave Chanute
- Scientific career
- Workplaces: NACA

Pearl Irma Young (1895 – 1968) became the first female technical employee of the National Advisory Committee for Aeronautics (NACA), which evolved to become today's NASA. She became Chief Technical Editor at NACA's Langley Instrument Research Laboratory, and an engineering professor.

== Early life and education ==
Pearl Irma Young was born October 12, 1895, in Minnesota. She grew up in North Dakota after leaving home at 11. She attended Jamestown College and the University of North Dakota. She graduated with a bachelor's degree in 1919 with honors, a Phi Beta Kappa key and a triple major in physics, chemistry and mathematics. She was hired by the university to teach physics in 1922.

== Career ==
In 1922 Young was hired as a physicist by the National Advisory Committee for Aeronautics (NACA), and was assigned to the Langley Memorial Aeronautical Laboratory's Instrument Research Division under the direction of Henry J.E. Reid. In 1929 Reid appointed Young as Langley's Chief Technical Editor. She established an office, hired staff and formed the research reports and official documents that communicated the extraordinary technical accomplishments of Langley. Young wrote NACA's Style Manual for Engineering Authors, a reference work which had lasting influence at Langley and elsewhere at NACA. In 1943, Young left the Langley lab to go to NACA's new Aircraft Engine Research Laboratory in Cleveland, Ohio, which became the NASA Lewis Research Center. In 1947 she went to Pennsylvania State University to be an assistant professor of engineering physics. She returned to the Lewis Research Center in 1958.

NACA was incorporated into NASA in 1958. Over her 28 years at the NACA and NASA, Young helped define the public image of the NACA and influenced the way the U.S. government's aeronautical engineers communicated in publication. Young retired in 1961 from NASA, and taught physics for another year at Fresno State University. She then turned her full-time attentions to researching a biography of aviation pioneer Octave Chanute. Chanute is one of the most important figures in the history of aviation. In addition to his own experimentation with flight in the late 19th century, he was the "central disseminator of aeronautical developments around the world." She compiled her findings in various article and pamphlets.

== Legacy ==
A theater at NASA Langley was named for Pearl Young in 1995.

Archives of Pearl Young's papers are at the Denver Public Library, the University of Wyoming, and at the University of North Dakota.

== Works ==
- Young, Pearl I (1963). Octave Chanute, 1832-1910; the contributions of an American civil engineer to the improvement of railroads, railroad bridges, timber preservation, and aeronautics; a bibliography (First ed.). San Francisco, CA: E.L. Sterne, aeronautical bookseller.. The publisher printed 255 copies, of which 250 were for sale or distributed to various libraries. The 28-page booklet contains a short biography (3 pages) with the remainder listing writings and speeches by or about Chanute.
- Style Manual for Engineering Authors (NACA)
