= Sally J. Smith =

American business woman

- Born: Sioux Falls, South Dakota
- Education: University of North Dakota (Bachelor of Science in Business Administration and Accounting)
- Occupations: Former President and CEO
- Children: 2

Sally J. Smith (born c. 1958) was the president and former chief executive officer of Buffalo Wild Wings, Inc.

== Early life and education ==
Sally Smith was born in Sioux Falls, South Dakota. She graduated from the University of North Dakota in 1979, earning a Bachelor of Science in business administration and accounting.

== Career ==
Smith was hired by Buffalo Wild Wings in 1994 as the chief financial officer and was promoted to president and CEO in 1996, when the chain had about 70 locations. Under Smith's leadership, the chain restaurant expanded from 35 locations in 1994 to 1175 as of February 2016. In April 2017, Marcato Capital Management, which had acquired a stake in Buffalo Wild Wings the prior year, called on Smith to resign, citing concerns with the restaurant chain's sales and stock performance. In June 2017, Marcato Capital Management announced that Buffalo Wild Wing's shareholders had elected three of its activist investor's nominees to the company's board, including Mick McGuire, Marcato's founder and managing partner. The company announced that Smith would step down at the end of 2017. However, earlier in 2017, Smith had already began negotiations of a potential sale of Buffalo Wild Wings to Roark Capital Group, an Atlanta-based private equity firm, and parent of Arby's Restaurant Group. Smith stayed in her role as CEO through February 2018, overseeing the completion of the sale of Buffalo Wild Wings to Roark, as a strategic acquisition by Roark's Arby's Restaurant Group. Roark Capital agreed to buy Buffalo Wild Wings for about $2.9 billion.

Smith also served as chair of the National Restaurant Association. In 2016, Smith was awarded the TDn2K Workplace Legacy Award, which recognizes leaders in the restaurant industry who have demonstrated success in balancing superior people practices and best-in-class operational results.

In 2017, Smith announced she would retire from her role as CEO at Buffalo Wild Wings.

== Personal life ==
Smith is the daughter of Dick Wold, who was the leader of First National Bank of Grand Forks, which is now Alerus Financial.
