= University of North Dakota School of Medicine and Health Sciences =

Public medical school in Grand Forks, North Dakota, US

Coordinates: 47°55′28″N 97°04′04″W

UND School of Medicine and Health Sciences
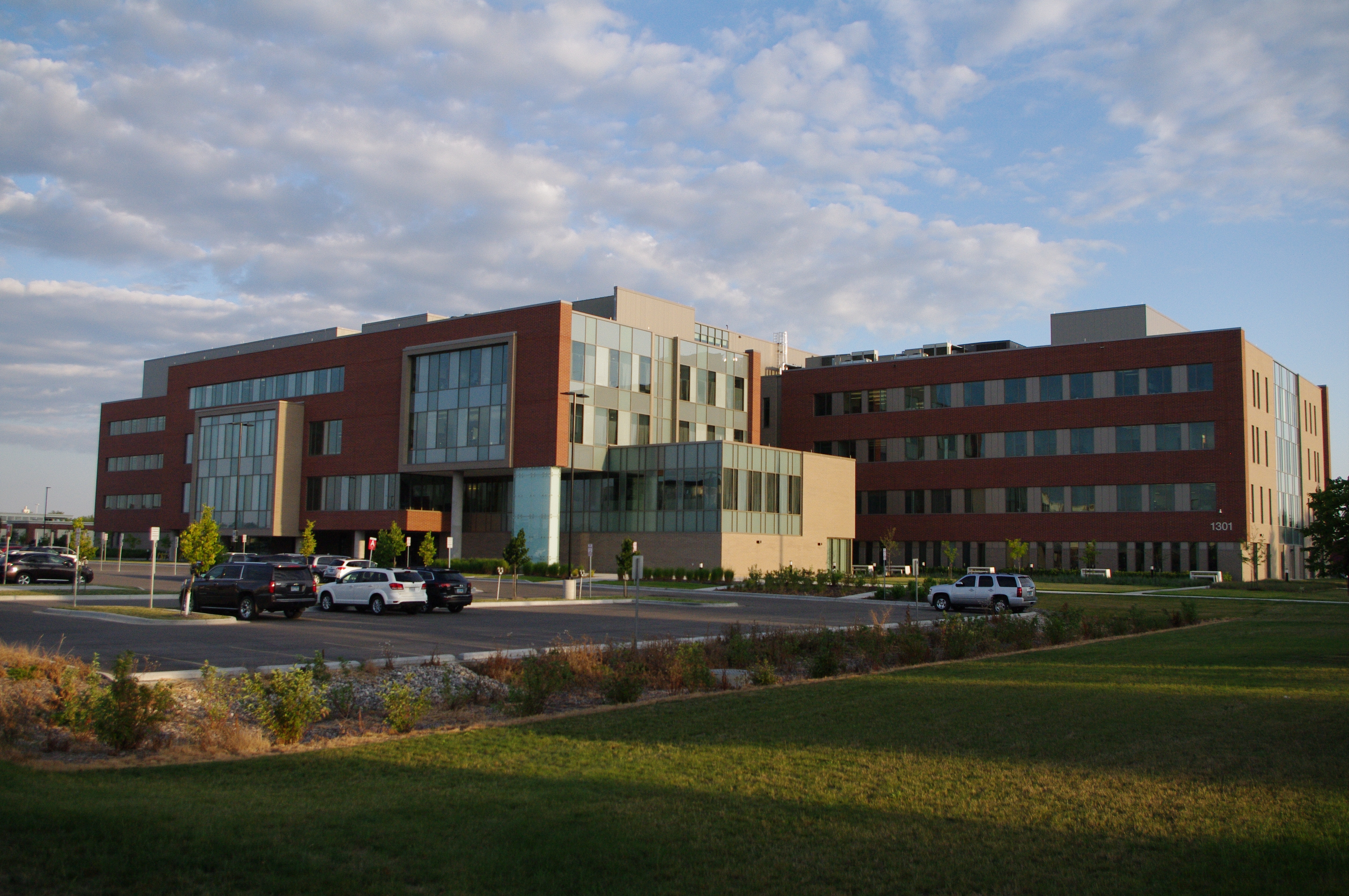
- Type: Public
- Established: 1905
- Dean: Marjorie R. Jenkins, MD, MEdHP, FACP
- Faculty: 180
- Students: 300+ medical students, 400+ health sciences students
- Postgraduates: ~ 100
- Doctoral students: ~ 100
- Location: Grand Forks, North Dakota, USA
- Campus: Urban
- Website: med.UND.edu

The UND School of Medicine & Health Sciences is located in Grand Forks, North Dakota, at the University of North Dakota and is the only school of medicine in the state of North Dakota.

Founded in 1905 as a two-year school offering the Bachelor of Science in Medicine degree, the school today houses a four-year medical doctorate program and houses degree programs for students interested in physician assistant studies, physical therapy, occupational therapy, medical laboratory science, athletic training/sports medicine, and public health. It also offers master and doctoral-level training programs for researchers focused on the biomedical sciences and clinical and translational science.

The community-based medical school has four campuses located throughout North Dakota:

- The Northeast Campus, which is the main campus, is located in Grand Forks.
- The Northwest campus is located in Minot, ND
- The Southeast Campus is located in Fargo, ND
- The Southwest Campus is located in Bismarck, ND

== Research ==
Housing NIH-funded programs studying neurodegenerative conditions, infectious disease, and epigenetics, the School was awarded more than $33 million in extramural research funds in fiscal year 2026.

The School is home to the Center for Rural Health, which doubles as North Dakota's State Office of Rural Health and focuses on the health of rural communities. The Center has been awarded numerous state and federal awards. The Center's programs include the nationally recognized Rural Health Information Hub, the National Resource Center on Native American Aging, and other programs. In 2009, President Barack Obama appointed former Center for Rural Health Director, Dr. Mary Wakefield, the Administrator of the Human Resources and Services Administration (HRSA).

== History ==
The School officially transitioned from a BS Med program to an MD program in 1976. By 1996 the School had changed its name from the UND School of Medicine to the UND School of Medicine & Health Sciences.

In May 2013, the 63rd Assembly of the North Dakota Legislative Assembly approved funding for a new $124 million, 325,000-square-foot, four-story building on the northeast corner of the UND campus. This building was completed in the summer of 2016 and opened on August 1, 2016.
