= Energy and Environmental Research Center =

Research center in North Dakota, US

Coordinates: 47°55′10″N 97°03′41″W

Energy & Environmental Research Center
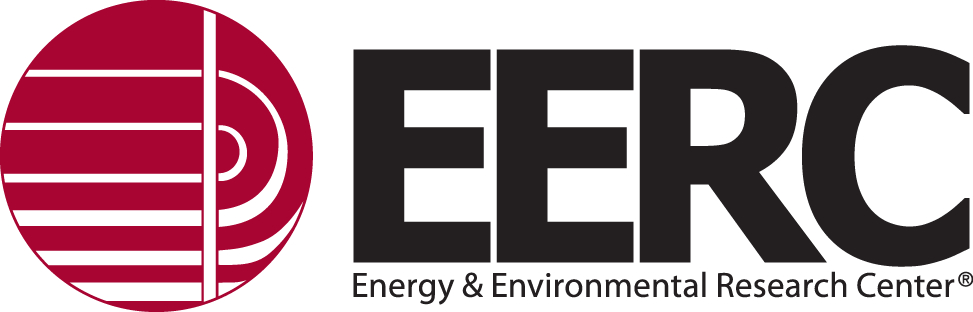
- Established: 1951
- Director: Charles Gorecki
- Staff: 270
- Address: 15 North 23rd Street, Stop 9018; Grand Forks, ND 58202
- Location: Grand Forks, North Dakota, United States
- Website: https://undeerc.org

The Energy & Environmental Research Center (EERC) is a research, development, demonstration, and commercialization facility for energy and environmental technologies development. The center is a nonprofit division of the University of North Dakota, located in Grand Forks, North Dakota, United States.

== History ==
The center was founded in 1951 as the Robertson Lignite Research Laboratory, a federal facility under the United States Bureau of Mines, named after Charles R. Robertson. It became a federal energy technology center under the United States Department of Energy in 1977 and was defederalized in 1983. The center employs approximately 270 employees.

The EERC has a current contract portfolio of over $208.4 million and the EERC's estimated regional economic impact is $78.1 million. Since 1987, the EERC has had more than 1,300 clients in 50 states and 53 countries worldwide.

== Research ==
The EERC conducts research, development, demonstration, and deployment activities involving zero-emissions coal conversion; CO_{2} capture and sequestration; energy and water sustainability; hydrogen and fuel cells; advanced air emission control technologies, emphasizing SO_{x}, NO_{x}, air toxics, fine particulate, CO_{2}, and mercury control; renewable energy; wind energy; water management; flood prevention; global climate change; waste utilization; energy efficiency; and contaminant cleanup.

== Location and facilities ==
The EERC is located on more than 15 acres (61,000 m^{2}) of land on the southeast corner of the UND campus in Grand Forks, North Dakota, and houses 254,000 square feet (23,600 m^{2}) of laboratories, fabrication facilities, technology demonstration facilities, and offices.
