= Wade Dokken =

American financial writer and businessman

Wade Dokken (born March 3, 1960) is an American financial writer and businessman.

Wade Dokken was raised in rural North Dakota and attended the University of North Dakota, where he studied political science and journalism. After graduating, Dokken became an account executive at Paine Webber. Gaining knowledge and expertise in annuities, Dokken went on to become the National Sales Manager at American Skandia. After being named CEO of American Skandia in 2000, Dokken partnered with Goldman Sachs to guide the sale of the company to Prudential Financial in 2003 for $1.2 billion. Dokken now lives in Bozeman, Montana, where he serves as President of Wealthvest, a financial services marketing and distribution firm specializing in fixed- and fixed-index annuities from many high-quality insurance companies.

Wade Dokken is the author of New Century, New Deal: How to Turn Your Wages into Wealth through Social Security Choice. The book criticizes the Social Security system for being unsustainable and suggests individuals invest in private accounts such as annuities, stocks, and bonds.

== Publications ==
New Century, New Deal: How to Turn Your Wages into Wealth through Social Security Choice (Regnery Publishing, 2000). (ISBN 0895262401)
