= Skandia =

Swedish financial services company

- Type: Private company
- Industry: Financial services
- Founded: 1855; 171 years ago
- Headquarters: Stockholm, Sweden
- Area served: Sweden
- Key people: Frans Lindelöw (CEO)
- Products: Life insurance Savings and investment Asset management Banking; Short-term insurance Annuities; Mutual funds
- Number of employees: 2,500 (2013)
- Website: www.skandia.se www.skandia.com

Skandia is a Swedish financial services corporation that provides insurance, banking and asset management services.

Between 2006 and 2015, the financial group underwent major changes. From an insurance company with the main emphasis on non-life insurance to a business that is globally focused on savings, to once again becoming a Nordic banking and insurance group with a focus on security and long-term savings. In February 2006, the South African company Old Mutual took over the majority of shares in the company. In March 2012, Skandia Liv bought Skandia's Nordic operations back from Old Mutual and decided to transform Skandia into a customer-owned, mutual company retaining the Skandia name.

== History ==
Skandia started out as a Swedish insurance company in 1855. It would go on to operates in Europe, Latin America, and Asia. Skandia also operated an internet bank called Skandiabanken in the Nordic region.

In 1979, the company formed a UK subsidiary, Skandia Life.

In 2003, the operations in North America, American Skandia, were acquired by Prudential Financial. The CEO of American Skandia, Wade Dokken partnered with Goldman Sachs and sold the division to Prudential Financial for $1.2 billion.

In 2005 South African financial services group Old Mutual launched a $6.5bn (£3.6bn) bid to acquire majority control of Skandia, which was met with resistance from some of Skandia's shareholders and directors. On 3 February 2006 Old Mutual completed its acquisition of Skandia, which was subsequently delisted from the Stockholm and London stock exchanges.

As of 2013, Skandia's largest operation, in terms of new business and profit, was the United Kingdom which was launched back in 1979. Their UK headquarters was Skandia House in Southampton. Skandia in the UK, along with Old Mutual Global Investors, formed Old Mutual Wealth. As well as in the UK, Old Mutual Wealth had operations in Europe and various international markets, overseeing £78.5 billion in customer investments. Paul Feeney was the Chief Executive Officer of Old Mutual Wealth.

In March 2012 Old Mutual sold the Nordic businesses (Sweden, Denmark, Norway) to the Swedish-based Skandia Liv, a partly mutual assurer, in an all-cash deal for £2.1bn. Skandia UK, Skandia International and the Skandia European businesses outside the Nordic region were rebranded as 'Old Mutual Wealth' in September 2014.

== Operations ==
Following the sale of Skandia in Sweden, Denmark and Norway, the Skandia brand operates independently of Old Mutual.

== Sponsorships ==
Skandia UK was the title sponsor of the world’s largest sailing regatta, Cowes Week, held on the Isle of Wight, UK for 14 years, ending its association in 2008. From April 2006 to March 2013, Skandia UK was the title sponsor of the British sailing team, Skandia Team GBR. The team competed in the Olympic and Paralympic classes and included multiple Olympic gold medal winners such as Ben Ainslie and Iain Percy.

Skandia Poland sponsors the Skandia Marathon, a cycling event organised by Langteam in which over 1000 competitors, aged from 4 to 80 years old, take part.

Skandia International, which specialises in offshore investment, sponsors the Royal Hong Kong Yacht Club and partners the United Arab Emirates Professional Golf Association in Singapore.

== Rebranding ==
Skandia's old logo

Following Old Mutual's takeover, Skandia announced it would be "going green" and underwent a rebranding from January 2008. The company announced that it would take 18 months for the rebranding to complete, with the UK and offshore division being first. The old logo was replaced with a new one to be more in-line with Old Mutual's colours.

Following Old Mutual’s sale the Nordic businesses (Sweden, Denmark, Norway) in March 2012 to the Swedish-based Skandia Liv, a partly mutual assurer, Skandia UK, Skandia International and the Skandia European businesses outside the Nordic region were rebranded as 'Old Mutual Wealth' in September 2014.

== Criticisms ==
Controversy surrounded Skandia in the mid-nineties, mostly due to illegal internal affairs with the Swedish Skandia Life, and for having provided executives with subsidized apartments in Stockholm. The involved executives are among others Lars-Eric Petersson and Ulf Spång. The Skandia trademark and reputation were tainted in Sweden during this time. It was alleged in late 2003 that executives at Skandia had embezzled 13 billion Swedish kronor. Subsequently, the board had to resign and, in 2006, Lars-Eric Petersson was sentenced to two years in prison. However, the case was later appealed to a higher court.

On 19 December 2007, the Court of Appeal dismissed all charges against Lars-Eric Petersson.

The charges by the prosecutor proceeded from the prerequisite that the payments from Skandia’s bonus program, called Wealthbuilder, to the beneficiaries were limited to an amount of SEK 300 million during the time period 1 January 1998 – 31 December 1999. According to the prosecutor, Lars-Eric Petersson had, without the consent of the Board, removed the cap on the bonus programme by signing a document named Appendix 3, and thus causing payments of additionally approx. SEK 156 million to the beneficiaries. According to the Court of Appeal, the prosecutor was not able to prove that the limitation for Wealthbuilder was still in force when Lars-Eric Petersson signed Appendix 3 in December 2000. The charges were therefore dismissed. (Translation of the press release from the Svea Court of Appeal)

On 26 March 2010, the former legal head of Skandia Germany, Michael Wolski, was prosecuted for tax fraud of the Cezanowski family (about EUR 50 million which Michael Wolski cashed in) for 2 years and 6 months jail in Darmstadt, Germany. His wife Karin Wolski, who is a high court judge, resigned on the same day. His wife is driving among others a Bugatti Veyron, which was bought from the "stolen" money.

== List of chief executive officers ==
- 1855–1858 – Carl Gustaf von Koch
- 1858–1861 – C D Jederholm
- 1861–1869 – A W Dufva
- 1869–1886 – Elis Fischer
- 1887–1897 – Gustaf Lagerbring
- 1897–1920 – Karl Herlitz
- 1920–1930 – Oscar Kinnander
- 1930–1944 – Pär Ulmgren
- 1944–1955 – Iwar Sjögren
- 1955–1961 – Bengt Petri
- 1961–1969 – Pehr Gyllenhammar
- 1970–1971 – Pehr G. Gyllenhammar
- 1971–1981 – Arne Lundeborg
- 1981–1996 – Björn Wolrath
- 1997–2003 – Lars-Eric Petersson
- 2003–2004 – Leif Victorin
- 2004–2006 – Hans-Erik Andersson
- 2006–2008 – Julian Roberts
- 2008–2010 – Bertil Hult
- 2010–2012 – Mårten Andersson
- 2012–2015 – Bengt-Åke Fagerman
- 2015–present – Frans Lindelöw
