= John W. Ross (North Dakota architect) =

American architect

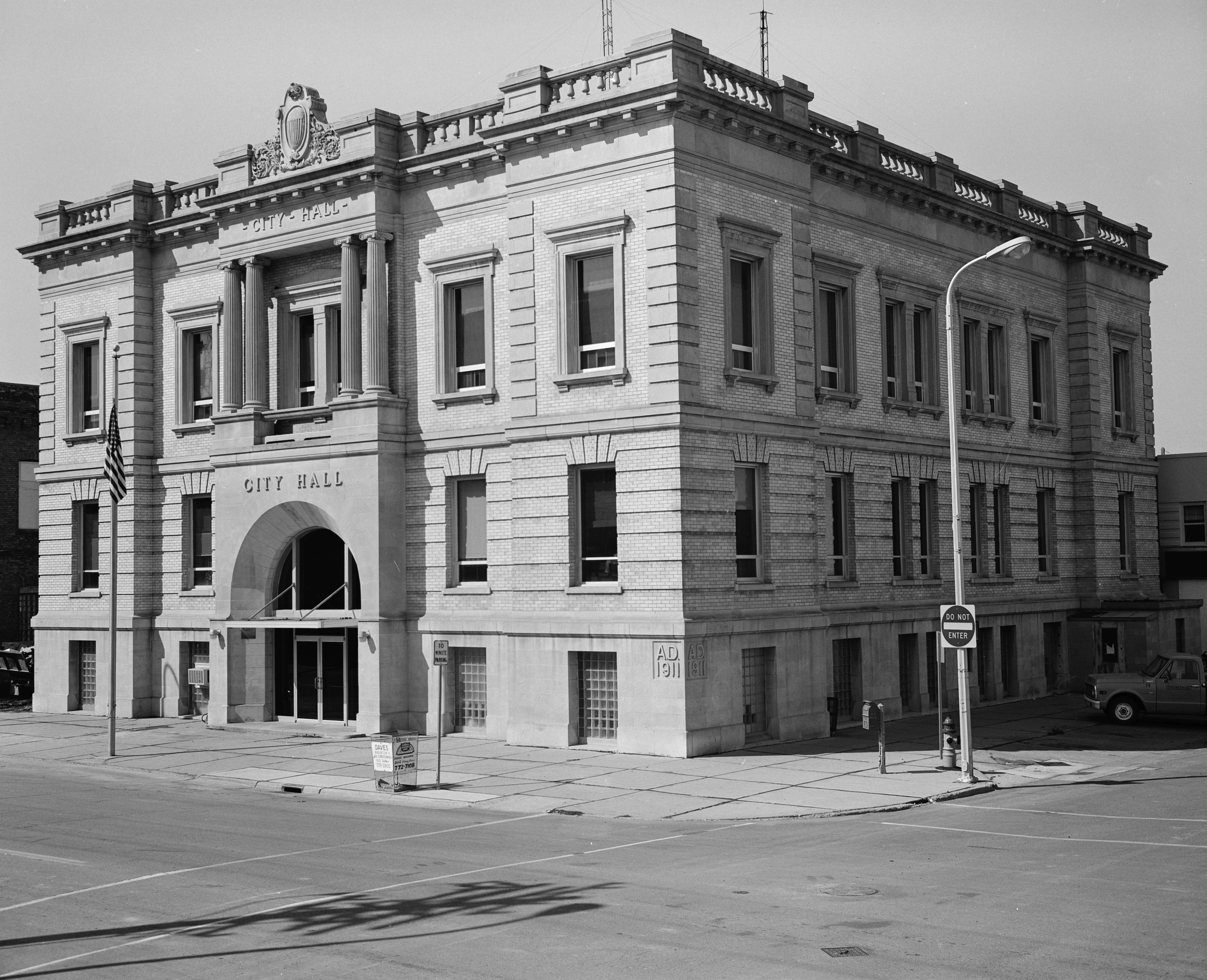
Grand Forks City Hall

John W. Ross (1848–1914) was the first licensed architect in Grand Forks, North Dakota.

== Biography ==
He was born in Germany in 1848, was brought to America by his parents as a young child, and grew up in La Crosse, Wisconsin. He studied architecture under Charles Ross, a leading architect in La Crosse. Ross moved to Grand Forks in the late 1800s. John W. Ross died in Grand Forks in 1914.

Ross designed many buildings in eastern North Dakota, including the 1901 Gothic revival St. Stanislaus Catholic Church in Warsaw and the Larimore City Hall, which was built in 1890.

== Works ==
Ross designed numerous buildings that are listed on the National Register of Historic Places and are preserved. His works include:

- Larimore City Hall, Block 64, bounded by Towner, 3rd, Terry and Main, Larimore, ND (Ross, J.W.)
- Goose River Bank, 45 Main St. E, Mayville, ND (Ross, John W.)
- St. Stanislaus Church (dedicated 1901), in the NRHP-listed St. Stanislaus Church Historic District, off I-29, Warsaw, ND (Ross, John W.)
- Wells County Courthouse, Railway St. N, Fessenden, ND (Ross, John W.)
- Grand Forks City Hall, 404 N. 2nd Ave., Grand Forks, ND (Ross, John W.) This building "is pure Beaux Arts. Rather small in scale and only two storeys over a raised basement, the City Hall is faced with ashlar and was similar in mass, style, and materials to the recently razed Carnegie Library which was located nearby."
- Grand Forks Woolen Mills, 301 N. 3rd St., Grand Forks, ND (Ross, John W.)
- Amos and Lillie Plummer House, 306 W. Caledonia Ave., Hillsboro, ND (Ross, John W.)
- Rudolf Hotel, Central Ave. and 2nd St., Valley City, ND (Ross, John W.)
- Pisek School, E end of Main St. at Lovick Ave., Pisek, ND (Ross, John)
- Renovation of second floor of Finks and Gokey Block, Grand Forks, ND
- Attributed as probable architect of Grand Forks Mercantile Building, Grand Forks, ND, 1898, Early Commercial
