= Chaseley, North Dakota =

Chaseley
- Unincorporated community
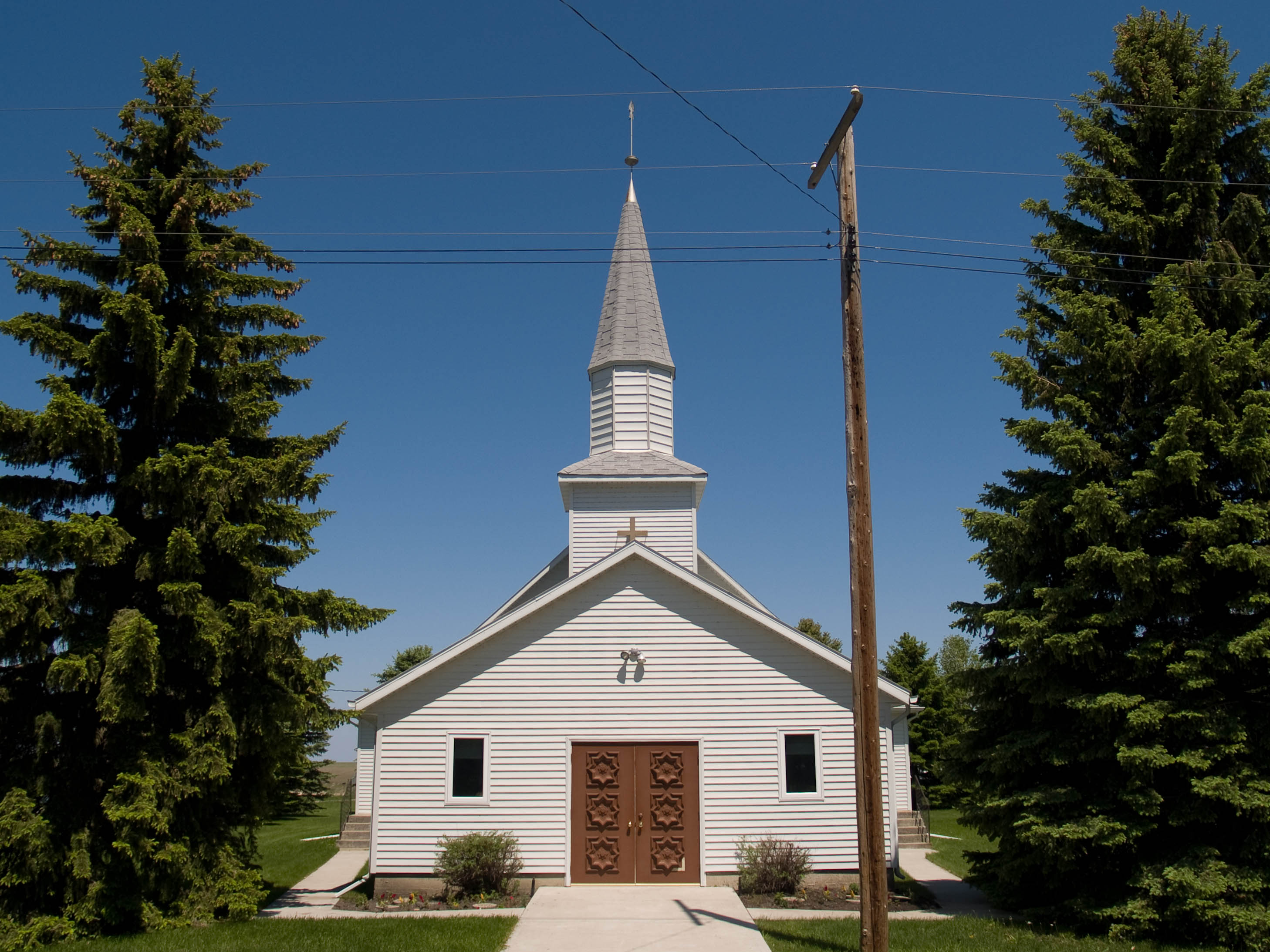
- Church in Chaseley

- Location within the state of North Dakota Chaseley (the United States)
- Coordinates: 47°27′01″N 99°49′12″W
- Country: United States
- State: North Dakota
- County: Wells
- Elevation: 1,867 ft (569 m)
- Time zone: UTC-6 (Central (CST))
  - Summer (DST): UTC-5 (CDT)
- ZIP codes: 58423
- Area code: 701
- GNIS feature ID: 1028349

Chaseley is an unincorporated community in southwestern Wells County, North Dakota, United States. It lies along North Dakota Highway 200 southwest of the city of Fessenden, the county seat of Wells County.

== History ==
It formerly had a post office, with the ZIP code of 58423. The population was 85 in 1940.
