= Gordon Kahl =

American tax resister (1920–1983)

Gordon Wendell Kahl
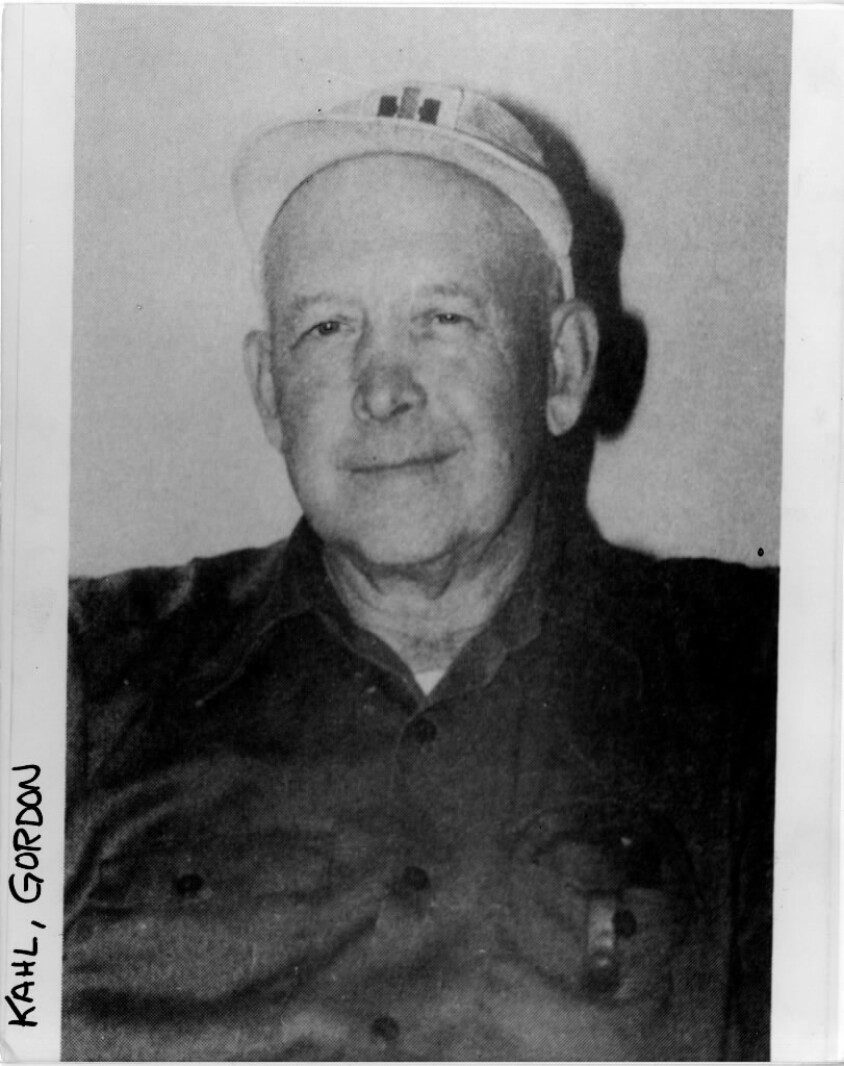
- Kahl in 1981
- Born: January 8, 1920; Wells County, North Dakota, U.S.
- Died: June 4, 1983 (aged 63); Smithville, Arkansas, U.S.
- Cause of death: Gunshot wound
- Resting place: Heaton cemetery, Heaton, North Dakota
- Occupations: Farmer, mechanic, tail gunner, flight engineer, political activist
- Organization: Posse Comitatus
- Known for: Involvement in two shootouts
- Spouse: Joan Seil (m. 1945)
- Children: Two sons and four daughters
- Military career
- Allegiance: United States
- Branch: United States Army Air Corps
- Service years: 1942–1945
- Rank: Staff sergeant
- Conflicts: World War II: North African campaign (WIA); European theater; Pacific War (WIA)
- Awards: Silver Star; Bronze Star Medal; Air Medal; Purple Heart (2); Presidential Unit Citation

Gordon Wendell Kahl (January 8, 1920 – June 3, 1983) was an American World War II veteran, farmer and tax protester who was known for being a one-time member of the Posse Comitatus movement and for his involvement in two fatal shootouts with law enforcement officers in the United States in 1983.

== Early life ==
Gordon Kahl was born in Wells County, North Dakota, on January 8, 1920, to Frederick (1886–1953) and Edna (Laudenslager) Kahl (1892–1967). Kahl had three sisters and one brother. Raised on a farm, Kahl was a highly decorated turret gunner during World War II, shooting down ten enemy planes. After the war, "he had a 400-acre (1.6 km^{2}) farm near Heaton, Wells County, North Dakota, but bounced around the Texas oilfields in later life as a mechanic and general worker."

In 1967, Kahl wrote a letter to the Internal Revenue Service stating that he would no longer "pay tithes to the Synagogue of Satan under the 2nd plank of the Communist Manifesto". In 1975 Kahl organized the first Texas chapter of the Posse Comitatus and became the state coordinator. In 1976 he appeared on a Texas television program with fellow tax protester William M. Rinehart and stated that the income tax was illegal and encouraged others not to pay their income taxes.

== Criminal conviction and prison ==
On November 16, 1976, Kahl was charged with willful failure to file federal income tax returns for the years 1973 and 1974, under 26 U.S.C. § 7203. He was convicted on each count in April and June 1977, and was sentenced to two years in prison and a fine of $2,000. Kahl served eight months in prison in 1977. One year of the sentence was suspended, as was the fine, and the court placed Kahl on probation for five years. Kahl appealed his conviction, but the conviction was affirmed in 1978 by the United States Court of Appeals for the Fifth Circuit.

== Activity after prison ==
Following Kahl's release from prison, he was informed that fellow Posse member William Rhinehart died of a heart attack while in prison and that despite pleas from other prisoners, authorities delayed in providing medical assistance to Rhinehart. Kahl believed that the government had given Rhinehart drugs to induce a heart attack in order to silence him.

Kahl became active in the township movement, an early version of the sovereign citizen movement. This movement sought to form parallel courts and governments purportedly based on English common law and constitutional law, and to withdraw recognition of the U.S. federal government. Township movement supporters attempted to organize among farmers in the American Midwest during the 1980s farm crisis.

== Confrontation and shootout near Medina, North Dakota ==
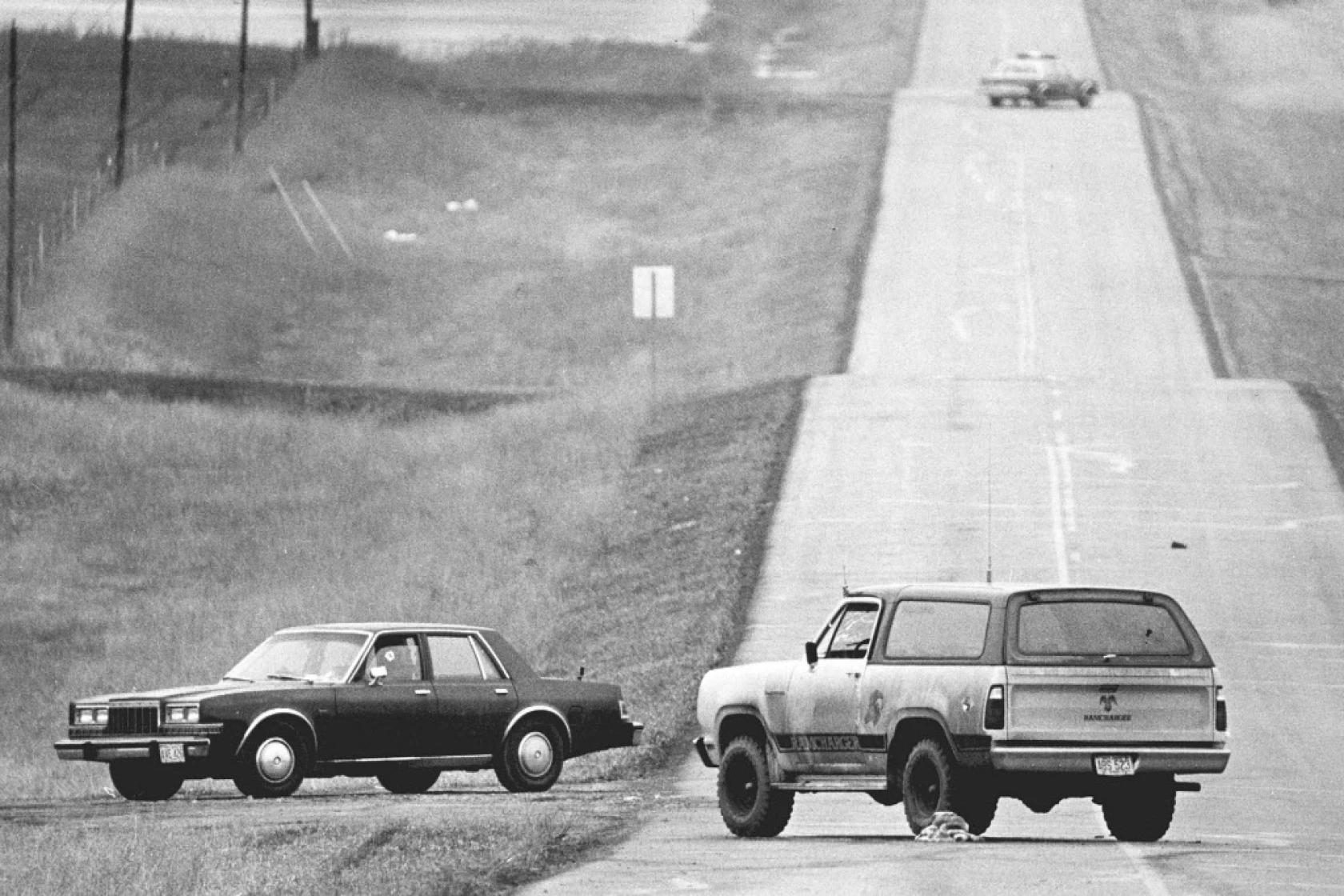
Aftermath of the February shoot out. Muir drove the car on the left while Cheshire drove the one on the right.

On February 13, 1983, the U.S. Marshals attempted to arrest Kahl for violating his parole as he was leaving a Farm Crisis meeting in Medina, North Dakota. In the car with Kahl were his wife Joan, his son Yorie Von, and three others who had been at the meeting. According to Scott Faul's testimony, both Gordon Kahl and Yorie Von Kahl were armed with Ruger Mini-14 rifles. The conflict began when federal marshals created a roadblock a few miles north of Medina. When the Kahl party met the marshals at the roadblock, a short but intense firefight erupted. The gun battle left Marshals Kenneth Muir and Robert Cheshire dead, and Marshal Jim Hopson, Medina Police Department Officer Steve Schnabel, and Stutsman County Sheriff Deputy Bradley Kapp injured. Yorie Von Kahl was also wounded during the firefight. The Kahl party fired over a dozen rounds during the gunfight, while the marshals and officers fired eight. Three lawmen fired their weapons during the confrontation, and only one, Marshal Carl Wigglesworth, escaped the gunfight unharmed by hiding in a ditch.

According to the U.S. Marshals Service, the Kahl party was traveling north out of Medina in two vehicles. Deputy Bradley Kapp and Marshals Robert Cheshire and Jim Hopson followed the Kahl party, while Medina police officer Steven Schnabel and Marshals Kenneth Muir and Carl Wigglesworth moved south towards Medina in two cars to intercept the Kahl party.

At one point, the Kahl party took a wrong turn off of a highway. As they attempted to back out, Cheshire blocked their escape with his vehicle, while Marshal Muir and Officer Schnabel blocked the Kahls from the north. It was then that the arrest attempt was made. The lawmen exited the vehicles with their weapons drawn and ordered Kahl to surrender. Gordon Kahl, his son Yorie Von, and friend Scott Faul exited their vehicles armed with Ruger Mini-14 rifles. Gordon took cover behind his vehicle, Yorie Von took cover behind a telephone pole, and Scott Faul ran from the highway towards a set of trees, seeking better cover. Marshal Wigglesworth ran after Faul and attempted to cut him off but became stuck in a thick swamp. Meanwhile, Cheshire attempted to get Kahl to surrender, but Kahl refused and told the marshals to "back off". The tense standoff continued for several more minutes before a shot was abruptly fired by one of the men.

The U.S. Marshals Service stated that Yorie Von Kahl fired the first shot at Cheshire from behind a telephone pole. The shot struck Cheshire in the chest, fatally wounding him. Yorie Von then fired a second shot at Deputy Bradley Kapp but missed. Kapp returned fire with a shotgun and fired four times at Yorie Von, seriously wounding him in the chest and face. As Kapp turned from the downed Yorie Von, Gordon fired at least one round through the windshield of Kapp's vehicle, wounding Kapp in the forehead with glass fragments. As Kapp fell behind his car door, Gordon fired two or three more times, and a round struck and shattered Kapp's body armor. The fatally wounded Cheshire managed to fire three rounds from his AR-15, all of which missed. Meanwhile, Scott Faul, taking cover in the nearby woods, fired at least seven rounds at Kapp and Cheshire's vehicle. One of Faul's shots hit the already wounded Cheshire a second time, and a bullet blew off Kapp's index finger. A third shot hit the pavement, and a piece of asphalt struck Marshal Hopson in the ear, causing Hopson to suffer permanent brain damage.

Wounded and out of ammunition, Kapp retreated to a ditch, but was unable to reload his shotgun due to the wound in his hand.

With Kapp down, Gordon turned to face US Marshal Kenneth Muir and Medina police officer Steve Schnabel, just as Muir fired off one round from a .38 caliber revolver. Muir's shot hit the already wounded Yorie Von Kahl square in the chest, but the bullet struck a revolver Yorie Von wore on a shoulder holster, and therefore did not penetrate. Before Muir could fire another shot, Kahl fired one round from his rifle at Muir, killing the marshal with a shot to the chest. Schnabel tried to return fire with his shotgun, but Gordon fired three more rounds at the officer as he tried to aim his weapon. One shot ricocheted, striking Schnabel in the back of the leg. The wounded Schnabel retreated to the side of the road and took cover in a ditch. The entire firefight lasted about thirty seconds.

Kahl then moved towards Cheshire's vehicle. As Kahl approached, the wounded Kapp decided to flee and began running south, back towards Medina. Kahl chose not to shoot the fleeing officer, and instead turned to the fatally wounded Cheshire, who was trying to climb back inside his vehicle. Seeing that Cheshire was still alive, Kahl killed the dying marshal with two more shots to the head. Gordon Kahl then walked over to Muir and Schnabel's vehicles as Scott Faul tended to the wounded Yorie Von Kahl. Moving to the side of the road, Kahl approached and confronted the wounded Schnabel, but chose not to kill him. After taking Schnabel's shotgun and revolver, Kahl then took Schnabel's police car and, after leaving the wounded Yorie Von Kahl at a Medina health clinic, fled to Arkansas. Kahl abandoned the stolen police car just outside of Medina. Yorie Von Kahl was immediately arrested after being treated at the clinic, while Scott Faul turned himself in to police.

== Police manhunt ==
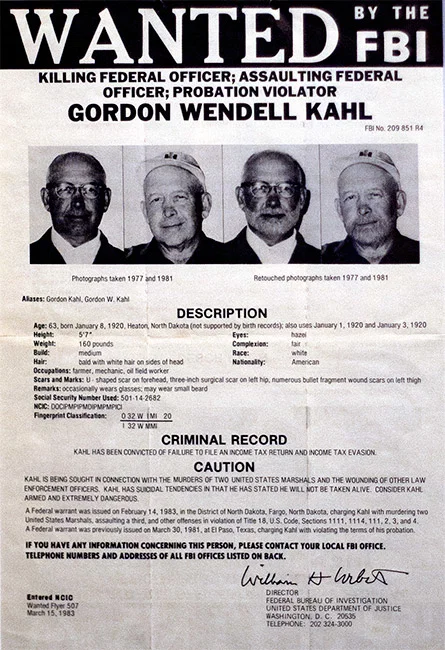
Wanted poster by the FBI

Following the gun battle, Kahl became a wanted fugitive by the FBI, and both local and federal authorities organized a massive manhunt. Several days after the Medina shootout, a SWAT team surrounded Kahl's farmhouse in Heaton, North Dakota. Unaware that the farmhouse had been abandoned, the SWAT team fired hundreds of shots into the home, killing Kahl's dog, and saturated the house with tear gas. After entering the house, the SWAT team found no sign of Kahl but did discover numerous weapons, ammunition, and white supremacist literature printed by the Posse Comitatus.

== Smithville, Arkansas, shootout and death ==
Kahl was being hidden at the property of Arthur H. Russell just outside of Mountain Home, Arkansas. Those who were harboring Kahl were afraid that the U.S. Marshals were getting close to finding out where Kahl was staying, and decided to move him to the residence of Leonard Ginter and his wife Norma Ginter. Kahl hid in their earth-bermed, passive-solar home in Smithville, Arkansas.

Another shootout on June 3, 1983, ended the lives of Kahl and Lawrence County Sheriff Harold Gene Matthews. After FBI agents, U.S. marshals, Arkansas State Police, and local police arrived at the Ginter home, Sheriff Matthews entered the home along with Deputy U.S. Marshal James Hall and Arkansas State Police investigator Ed Fitzpatrick. Matthews entered the kitchen and Kahl emerged from behind a refrigerator; the two men fired almost simultaneously. Kahl fired at least one round, striking Matthews in the chest (the bullet penetrating his heart, severely injuring him); Matthews fired a single .41 Magnum round from his four-inch Smith & Wesson Model 57 revolver, which hit Kahl in the head and instantly killed him. Hall and Fitzpatrick, hearing the gunfire, fired several shotgun blasts inside the house, accidentally striking Matthews in the torso with buckshot. Matthews managed to get to a police cruiser before he collapsed, and he gasped his last words, "I got him." After Matthews stumbled out of the house, a SWAT team — unaware that Kahl was dead — began firing thousands of rounds at the house, eventually setting it ablaze by pouring diesel fuel down the house's chimney. Kahl's burned remains were found the following day. Matthews, critically wounded by the bullet fired from Kahl's Mini-14, was taken to the hospital where he died on the operating table.

== Aftermath ==
Edwin C. Udey, Arthur H. Russell, Leonard Ginter, and Norma Ginter were all indicted for harboring and concealing a fugitive, and for conspiracy to do the same. They were convicted of all charges. The convictions were upheld on appeal. Leonard was convicted and sentenced to a federal prison, while Norma's sentence was suspended. Leonard was released in February 1987.

Leonard and Norma Ginter were each additionally charged with the capital murder of Sheriff Gene Matthews in relation to the federal harboring trial in state court. The capital murder charge was later dropped.

For their part in the Medina shootout, Yorie Von Kahl and Scott Faul were both sentenced to life in prison with eligibility for parole after thirty years. As of June 2024, both have been denied parole at each of their parole hearings. Yorie Von Kahl is serving his sentence at the Federal Correctional Institution at Pekin, Illinois. Scott Faul is serving his sentence at the Federal Correctional Institution at Sandstone, Minnesota.

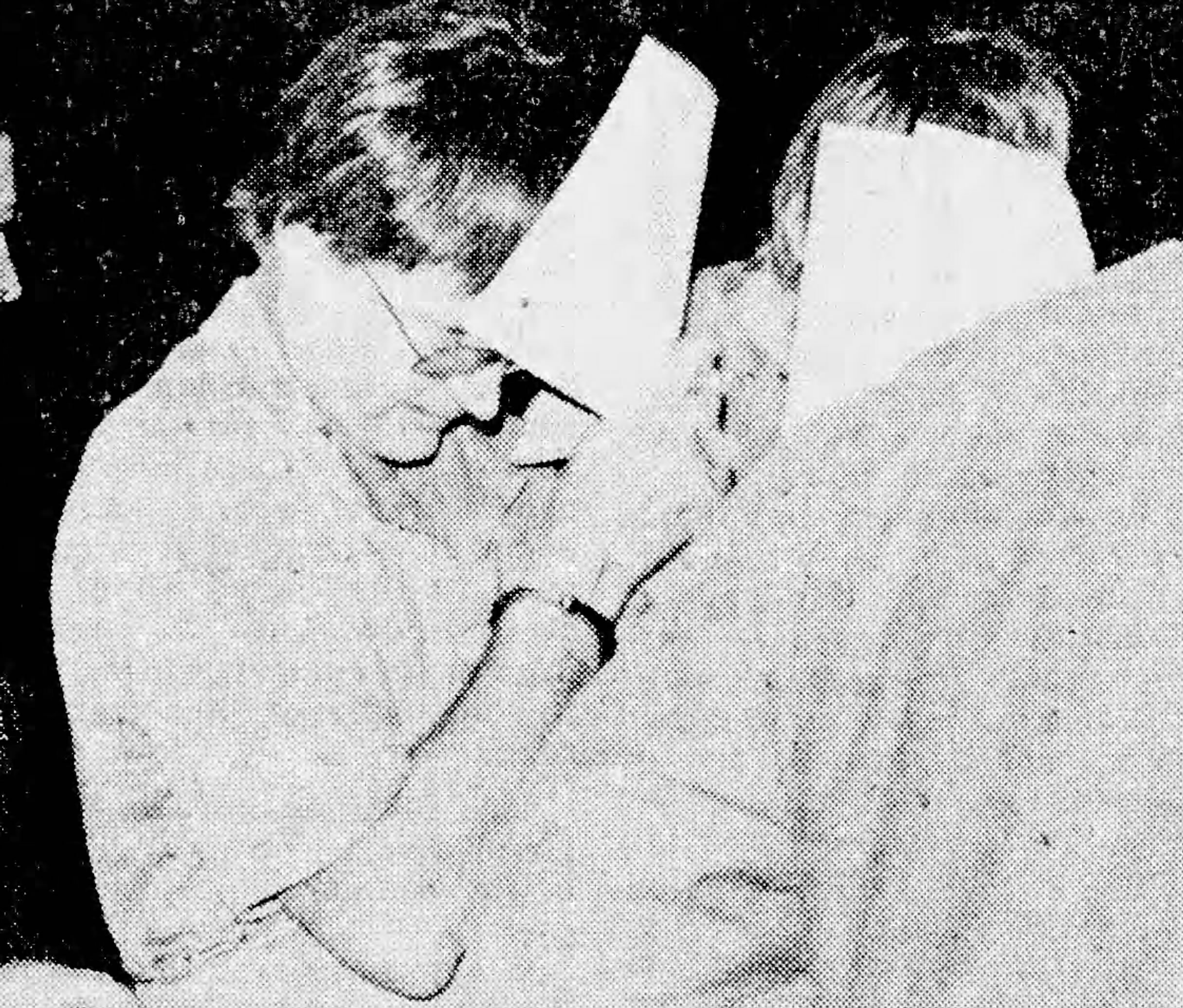
Broer (left) shields his face after being charged

David Ronald Broer (1939–2022) was acquitted of assaulting a police officer but was convicted of harboring and concealing a fugitive, with conspiracy to do the same. He was sentenced to ten years in prison and released in 1993.

Joan Kahl was acquitted.

Gordon Kahl was considered a martyr among tax protester groups, which helped disseminate his views and radicalize the movement.

== Personal life ==
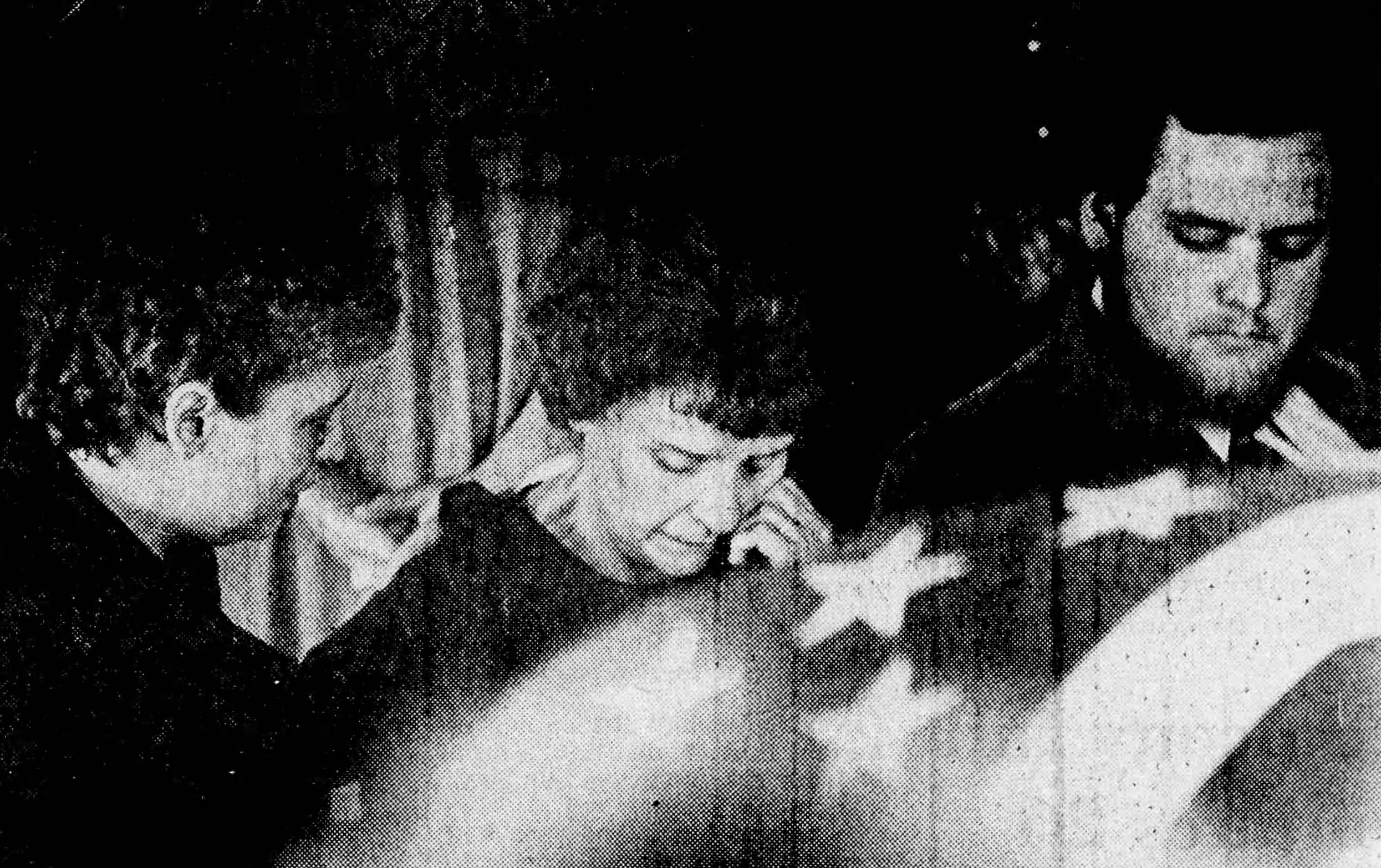
Gordon Kahl's funeral. Left to right: Linda, Joan, and Fred Kahl.

Kahl married Joan Miriam Seil in 1945. They had six children. Linda Kahl Holder, Gordon's eldest daughter, was found dead in her car on March 6, 1984, at the age of thirty-six, after committing suicide with a single self-inflicted gunshot wound to the chest. Joan Kahl died in a nursing home at the age of 93 on January 23, 2020.

== Media ==
A 1991 movie which was based on these events was titled In the Line of Duty: Manhunt in the Dakotas (aka Midnight Murders, and in the Netherlands it was titled In the Line of Duty: The Twilight Murders), starring actor Rod Steiger as Kahl and Michael Gross as the head FBI agent. The events also inspired the making of the documentary film Death & Taxes, which was released in 1993.

In Downtown Owl: A Novel, a book by Chuck Klosterman which is set in North Dakota in 1983 and 1984, the saga of Gordon Kahl is a constant topic of discussion among the residents of the fictional town of Owl, North Dakota.

In the 21st century, a South Dakota–based neo-Nazi podcaster whose real name is Riggin Lynn Scheer used the online monicker Gordon Kahl as a tribute. Scheer played a key role in promoting a pro-Nazi homeschooling network with thousands of members.

== See also ==
- Potentially dangerous taxpayer
- Tax protester history in the United States
