= Wells County Courthouse =

Wells County Courthouse may refer to:

- Wells County Courthouse (Indiana), Bluffton, Indiana
- Wells County Courthouse (North Dakota), Fessenden, North Dakota
