= Bremen, North Dakota =

Bremen
- Unincorporated community
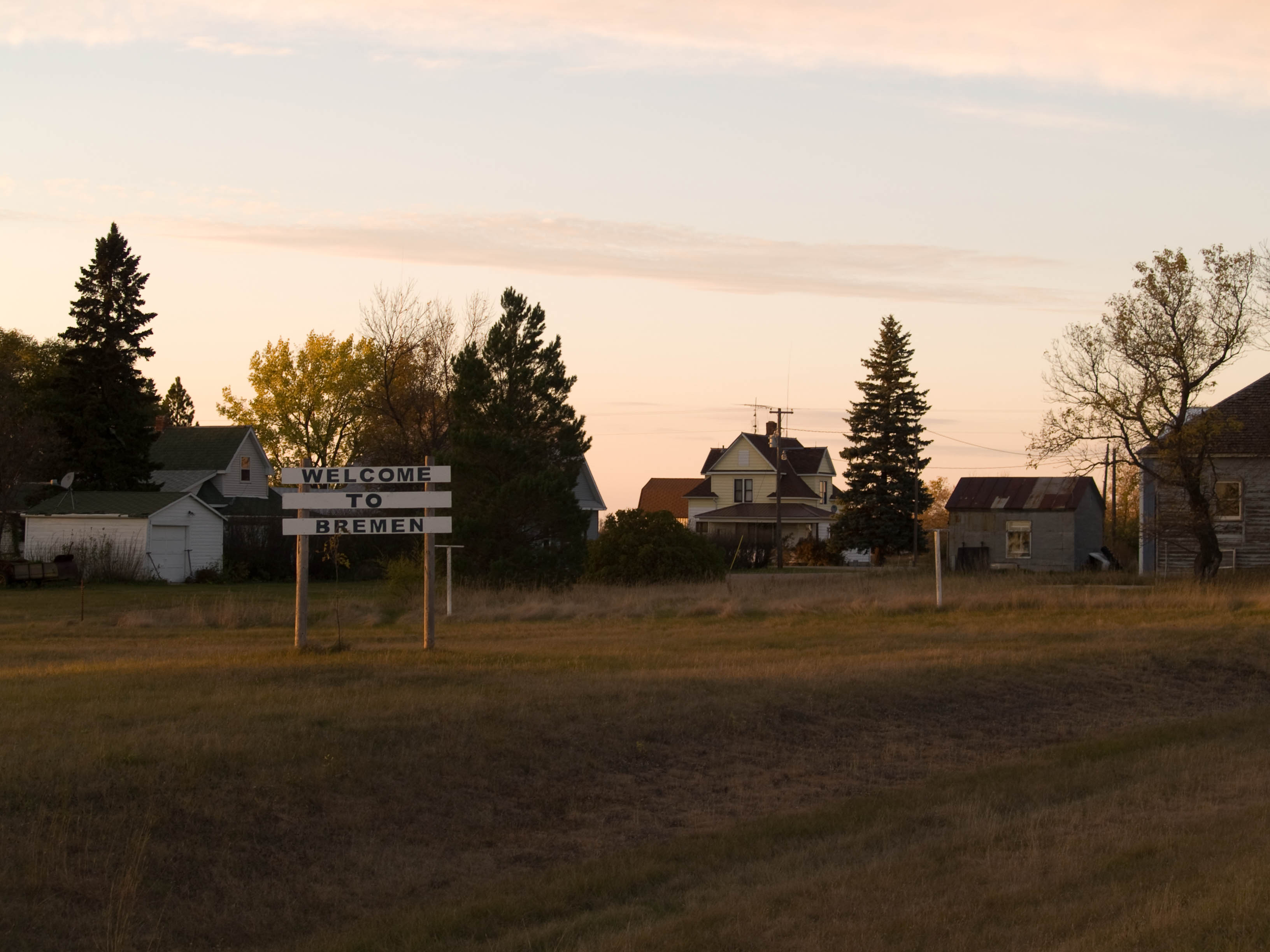
- Bremen

- Location within the state of North Dakota Bremen (the United States)
- Coordinates: 47°44′48″N 99°23′12″W
- Country: United States
- State: North Dakota
- County: Wells
- Elevation: 1,549 ft (472 m)
- Time zone: UTC-6 (Central (CST))
  - Summer (DST): UTC-5 (CDT)
- ZIP codes: 58356
- Area code: 701
- GNIS feature ID: 1033835

Bremen is an unincorporated community in northeastern Wells County, North Dakota, United States. It lies northeast of the city of Fessenden, the county seat of Wells County. The post office has closed, and the residents of the small community use the post office and postal code of New Rockford in neighboring Eddy County.

== History ==
The population was 105 in 1940.
