= Death and Taxes =

Death and Taxes may refer to:

== Idiom ==
- Death and taxes (idiom), a reference to a quotation by Benjamin Franklin

== Literature ==
- Death and Taxes, a 1931 poetry collection by Dorothy Parker
- Death and Taxes, the 1941 debut novel by David F. Dodge
- Death and Taxes, a 1967 novel by Thomas B. Dewey
- Death and Taxes, a 1976 book by Hans Sennholz
- Death and Taxes, a 1990 comic by Frank Miller; see Give Me Liberty
- Lobo: Death & Taxes, a 1996 comic book miniseries of the DC Comics character Lobo
- Groo: Death & Taxes, a four-issue comic book miniseries of Groo the Wanderer

== Media ==
=== Film ===
- Death and Taxes, title of a fictional book written by one of the characters in Stranger than Fiction (2006)
- Death & Taxes (film), a 1993 Jeffery J. Jackson documentary film about Gordon Kahl

=== Video game ===
- Death and Taxes (video game), a 2020 video game

=== Music ===
- "Death and Taxes", a song on the 2000 Kid Dynamite album Shorter, Faster, Louder
- Death & Taxes, a 64k Intro winner of the Scene.org Awards
- "Life After Death and Taxes (Failure II)", a Relient K song
- "Death and Taxes" (song), by Daniel Caesar

=== Television ===
- "Death and Taxes", a 1959 episode of Bat Masterson (TV series)
- "Death and Taxes", a 1986 episode of Magnum, P.I.; see List of Magnum, P.I. episodes
- "Death and Taxes'" a 1990 episode of Mancuso, F.B.I.
- "Death and Taxes", a 1991 episode of Zorro; see List of Zorro episodes (1990 series)
- "Death and Taxes", a 1994 episode of The Bill; see List of The Bill episodes (series 10)
- "Death and Taxes", a 1999 episode of Twice in a Lifetime
- "Death and Taxes", a 2001 episode of Blue Murder; see List of Blue Murder episodes
- "Death and Taxes", a 2003 episode of ER; see ER (season 10)
- "Death & Taxes", a Death & Taxes", a 2007 episode of Theme Time Radio Hour; see Theme Time Radio Hour Season One
- Death and Taxes: Joe Stack's Attack on the IRS, a 2010 CNN TV documentary about the 2010 Austin suicide attack

=== Websites ===
- Death and Taxes, a music and culture website owned by Prometheus Global Media

== Products ==
- Death & Taxes, a beer produced by Moonlight Brewing Company
