= Heimdal, North Dakota =

- Census-designated place & Unincorporated community
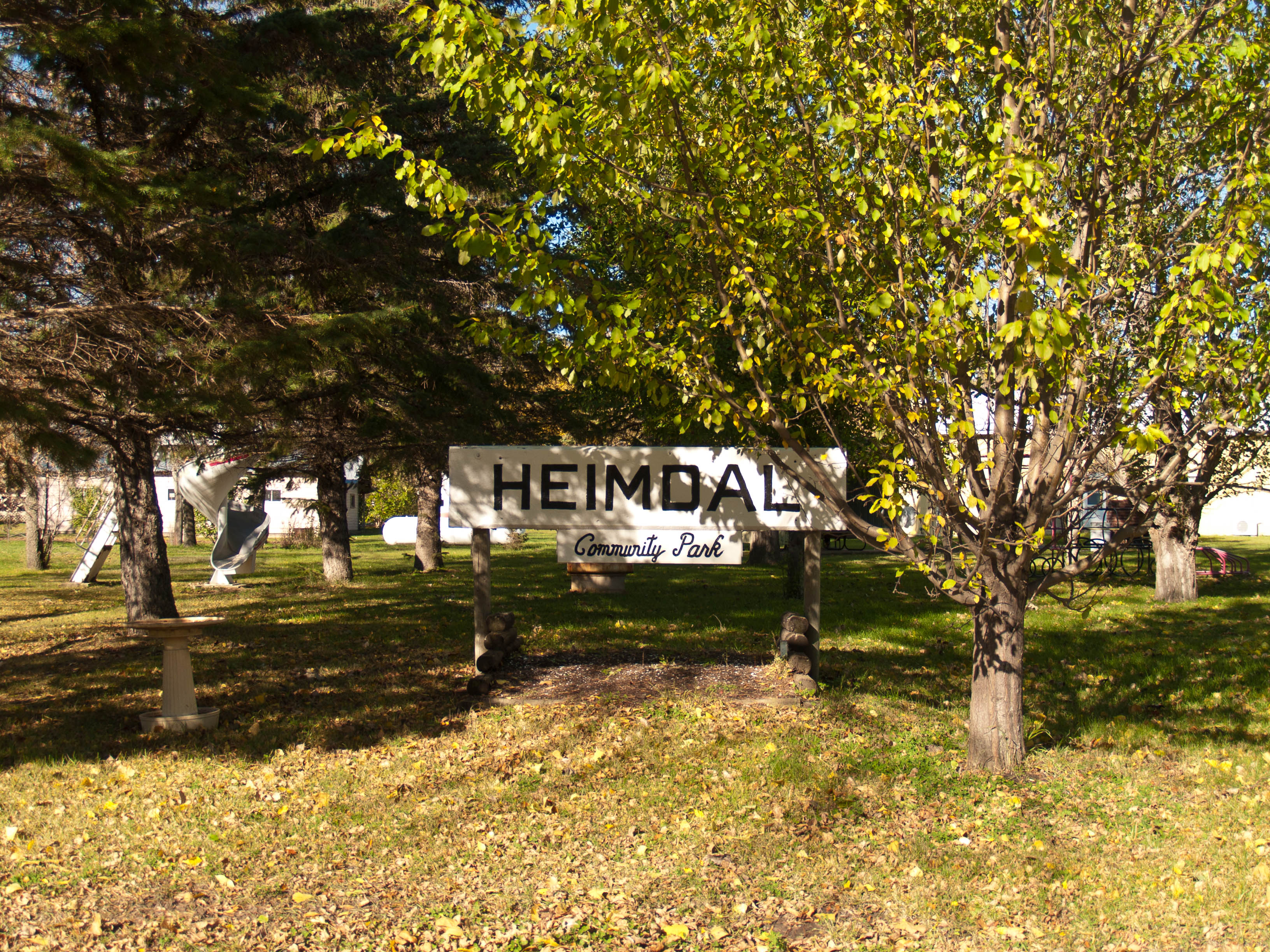
- Sign for Heimdal Community Park

- Location within North Dakota
- Coordinates: 47°47′34″N 99°39′10″W
- Country: United States
- State: North Dakota
- County: Wells

Area
  - Total: 0.47 sq mi (1.22 km^{2})
  - Land: 0.47 sq mi (1.22 km^{2})
  - Water: 0 sq mi (0.00 km^{2})
- Elevation: 1,588 ft (484 m)

Population (2020)
  - Total: 16
  - Density: 34.1/sq mi (13.15/km^{2})
- Time zone: UTC-6 (Central (CST))
  - Summer (DST): UTC-5 (CDT)
- ZIP code: 58341
- Area code: 701
- FIPS code: 38-37020
- GNIS feature ID: 2584347

Heimdal (/haɪmdɔːl/) is a census-designated place and unincorporated community in Wells County, North Dakota, United States. Its population was 16 as of the 2020 census.

== History ==
On May 6, 2015, a train carrying oil derailed and caught fire near Heimdal.

== Geography ==
According to the United States Census Bureau, the CDP has a total area of 0.47 square miles (1.22 km^{2}), all land.

== Demographics ==
Historical population
| Census | Pop. | Note | %± |
|---|---|---|---|
| 2020 | 16 | | — |
U.S. Decennial Census

=== 2010 census ===
As of the census of 2010, there were 27 people, 13 households, and 6 families residing in the CDP. The population density was 57.4 inhabitants per square mile (22.2/km^{2}). There were 33 housing units at an average density of 70.2 per square mile (27.1/km^{2}). The racial makeup of the CDP was 100.0% White.

There were 13 households, of which 23.1% had children under the age of 18 living with them, 38.5% were married couples living together, 7.7% had a female householder with no husband present, and 53.8% were non-families. 46.2% of all households were made up of individuals, and 38.5% had someone living alone who was 65 years of age or older. The average household size was 2.08 and the average family size was 3.17.

The median age in the CDP was 43.8 years. 29.6% of residents were under the age of 18; 3.7% were between the ages of 18 and 24; 22.2% were from 25 to 44; 11.1% were from 45 to 64; and 33.3% were 65 years of age or older. The gender makeup of the CDP was 33.3% male and 66.7% female.
