= Pisek School =

- U.S. National Register of Historic Places
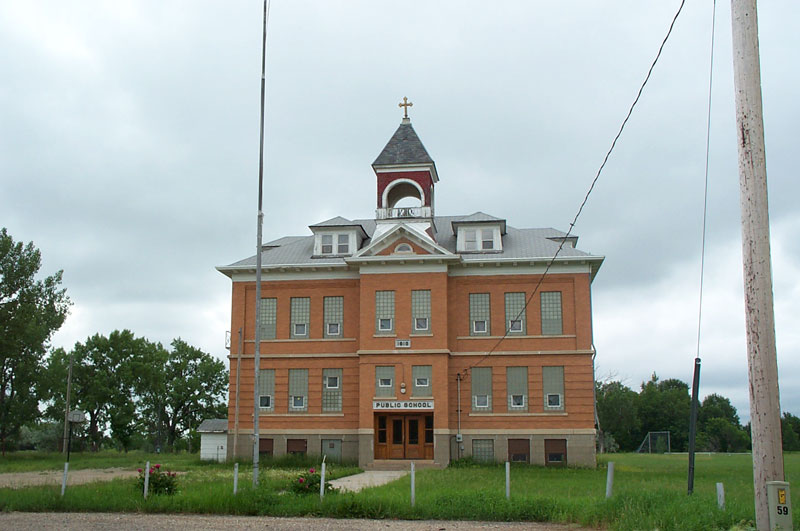

- Location within North Dakota Location within the United States
- Location: E end of Main St. at Lovick Ave., Pisek, North Dakota
- Coordinates: 48°18′37″N 97°42′21″W
- Area: 1.8 acres (0.73 ha)
- Built: 1913
- Built by: Melby & Standahl
- Architect: John W. Ross
- Architectural style: Classical Revival
- NRHP reference No.: 94000220
- Added to NRHP: March 17, 1994

The Pisek School in Pisek, North Dakota is a Classical Revival building. Pisek School was listed on the National Register of Historic Places in 1994.

Pisek School was built in 1913. It was designed by John W. Ross (1848-1914). Born in Germany, Ross came to America in 1852 with his parents who settled in Sauk City, Wisconsin. Later he studied architecture under his brother, Charles Ross, then a noted architect in LaCrosse. In 1880, John Ross moved to Grand Forks where he opened his architectural office. Ross designed buildings in and around Grand Forks from 1880 until he died in 1914. Ross also designed schools in Minto, Minot, Williston, Hamilton, and Hallock.

== Related reading ==
- Clement Augustus Lounsberry (1919) Early History of North Dakota: Essential Outlines of American History (Liberty Press)
