= Sykeston, North Dakota =

Sykeston
- City
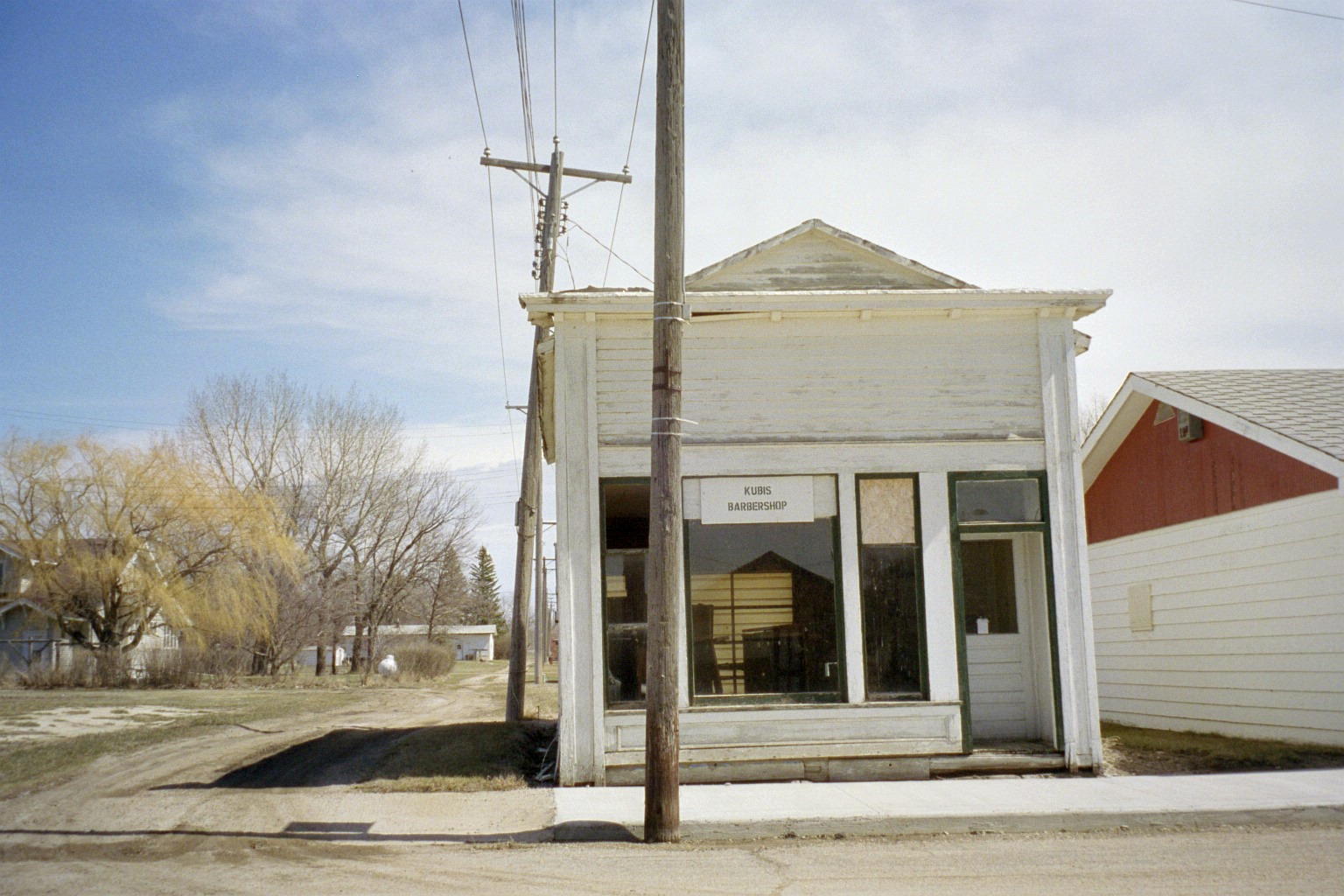
- Kubis Barbershop in Sykeston

- Location of Sykeston, North Dakota
- Coordinates: 47°27′58″N 99°23′58″W
- Country: United States
- State: North Dakota
- County: Wells
- Founded: 1883

Area
  - Total: 0.39 sq mi (1.02 km^{2})
  - Land: 0.39 sq mi (1.02 km^{2})
  - Water: 0 sq mi (0.00 km^{2})
- Elevation: 1,634 ft (498 m)

Population (2020)
  - Total: 105
  - Estimate (2022): 100
  - Density: 265.6/sq mi (102.54/km^{2})
- Time zone: UTC-6 (Central (CST))
  - Summer (DST): UTC-5 (CDT)
- ZIP code: 58486
- Area code: 701
- FIPS code: 38-77660
- GNIS feature ID: 1036291
- Website: www.sykestonnd.com

Sykeston is a city in Wells County, North Dakota, United States. The population was 105 at the 2020 census.

Sykeston was founded in 1883 by Richard Sykes, a prominent landowner and founder of several other cities in the state. The city was the county seat of Wells County from 1884 to 1894, when Fessenden took over that role.

As of 2010, the center of population of North Dakota was located approximately 9 miles (14 km) southeast of Sykeston.

== Geography ==
According to the United States Census Bureau, the city has a total area of 0.38 square miles (0.98 km^{2}), all land.

== Demographics ==
Historical population
Census	Pop.	Note	%±
1910	276		—
1920	367		33.0%
1930	327		−10.9%
1940	273		−16.5%
1950	272		−0.4%
1960	236		−13.2%
1970	232		−1.7%
1980	193		−16.8%
1990	167		−13.5%
2000	153		−8.4%
2010	117		−23.5%
2020	105		−10.3%
2022 (est.)	100		−4.8%
U.S. Decennial Census; 2020 Census

=== 2010 census ===
As of the census of 2010, there were 117 people, 65 households, and 36 families residing in the city. The population density was 307.9 inhabitants per square mile (118.9/km^{2}). There were 85 housing units at an average density of 223.7 per square mile (86.4/km^{2}). The racial makeup of the city was 98.3% White, 0.9% Asian, and 0.9% from two or more races.

There were 65 households, of which 13.8% had children under the age of 18 living with them, 38.5% were married couples living together, 9.2% had a female householder with no husband present, 7.7% had a male householder with no wife present, and 44.6% were non-families. 36.9% of all households were made up of individuals, and 16.9% had someone living alone who was 65 years of age or older. The average household size was 1.80 and the average family size was 2.25.

The median age in the city was 53.9 years. 11.1% of residents were under the age of 18; 3.5% were between the ages of 18 and 24; 19.6% were from 25 to 44; 36.7% were from 45 to 64; and 29.1% were 65 years of age or older. The gender makeup of the city was 48.7% male and 51.3% female.

=== 2000 census ===
As of the census of 2000, there were 153 people, 74 households, and 40 families residing in the city. The population density was 407.8 inhabitants per square mile (157.5/km^{2}). There were 95 housing units at an average density of 253.2 per square mile (97.8/km^{2}). The racial makeup of the city was 99.35% White, and 0.65% from two or more races.

There were 74 households, out of which 21.6% had children under the age of 18 living with them, 45.9% were married couples living together, 5.4% had a female householder with no husband present, and 45.9% were non-families. 43.2% of all households were made up of individuals, and 23.0% had someone living alone who was 65 years of age or older. The average household size was 2.07 and the average family size was 2.83.

In the city, the population was spread out, with 24.8% under the age of 18, 2.6% from 18 to 24, 22.2% from 25 to 44, 23.5% from 45 to 64, and 26.8% who were 65 years of age or older. The median age was 46 years. For every 100 females, there were 109.6 males. For every 100 females age 18 and over, there were 113.0 males.

The median income for a household in the city was $21,500, and the median income for a family was $28,750. Males had a median income of $21,000 versus $15,625 for females. The per capita income for the city was $11,342. About 10.5% of families and 14.3% of the population were below the poverty line, including 7.5% of those under the age of eighteen and 17.1% of those 65 or over.

== Notable people ==
- Travis Hafner, Major League Baseball player
- Larry Woiwode, distinguished author, North Dakota Poet Laureate.

== Climate ==
This climatic region is typified by large seasonal temperature differences, with warm to hot (and often humid) summers and cold (sometimes severely cold) winters. According to the Köppen Climate Classification system, Sykeston has a humid continental climate, abbreviated "Dfb" on climate maps.
