= Goose River Bank =

- U.S. National Register of Historic Places
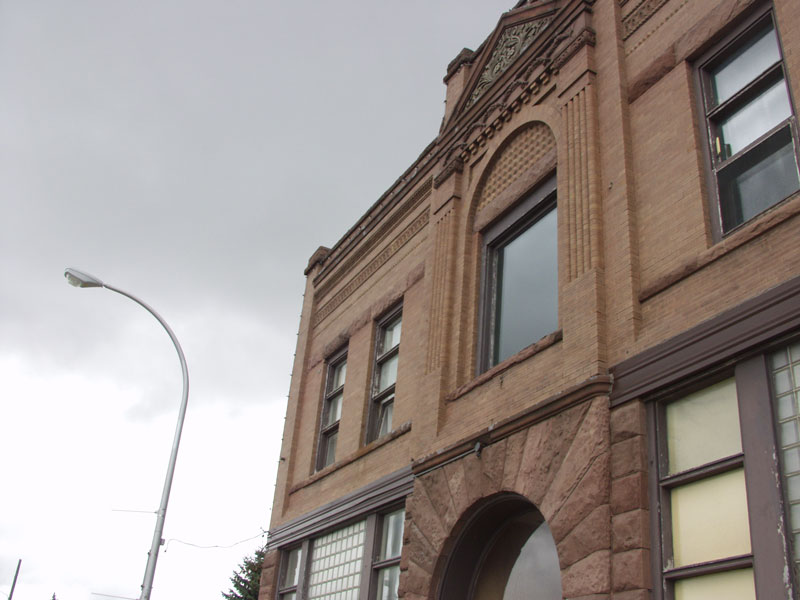
- Building in 2006

- Location within North Dakota Location within the United States
- Location: 45 Main St. E, Mayville, North Dakota
- Coordinates: 47°30′0″N 97°19′29″W
- Area: 0.2 acres (0.081 ha)
- Built: 1898
- Architect: John W. Ross, Eberhardt Coockin
- Architectural style: Richardsonian Romanesque
- NRHP reference No.: 85002793
- Added to NRHP: November 14, 1985

The Goose River Bank in Mayville, North Dakota was designed by John W. Ross and was built in 1898. It was listed on the National Register of Historic Places in 1985.
