= Amos and Lillie Plummer House =

Historic house in North Dakota, United States

- U.S. National Register of Historic Places
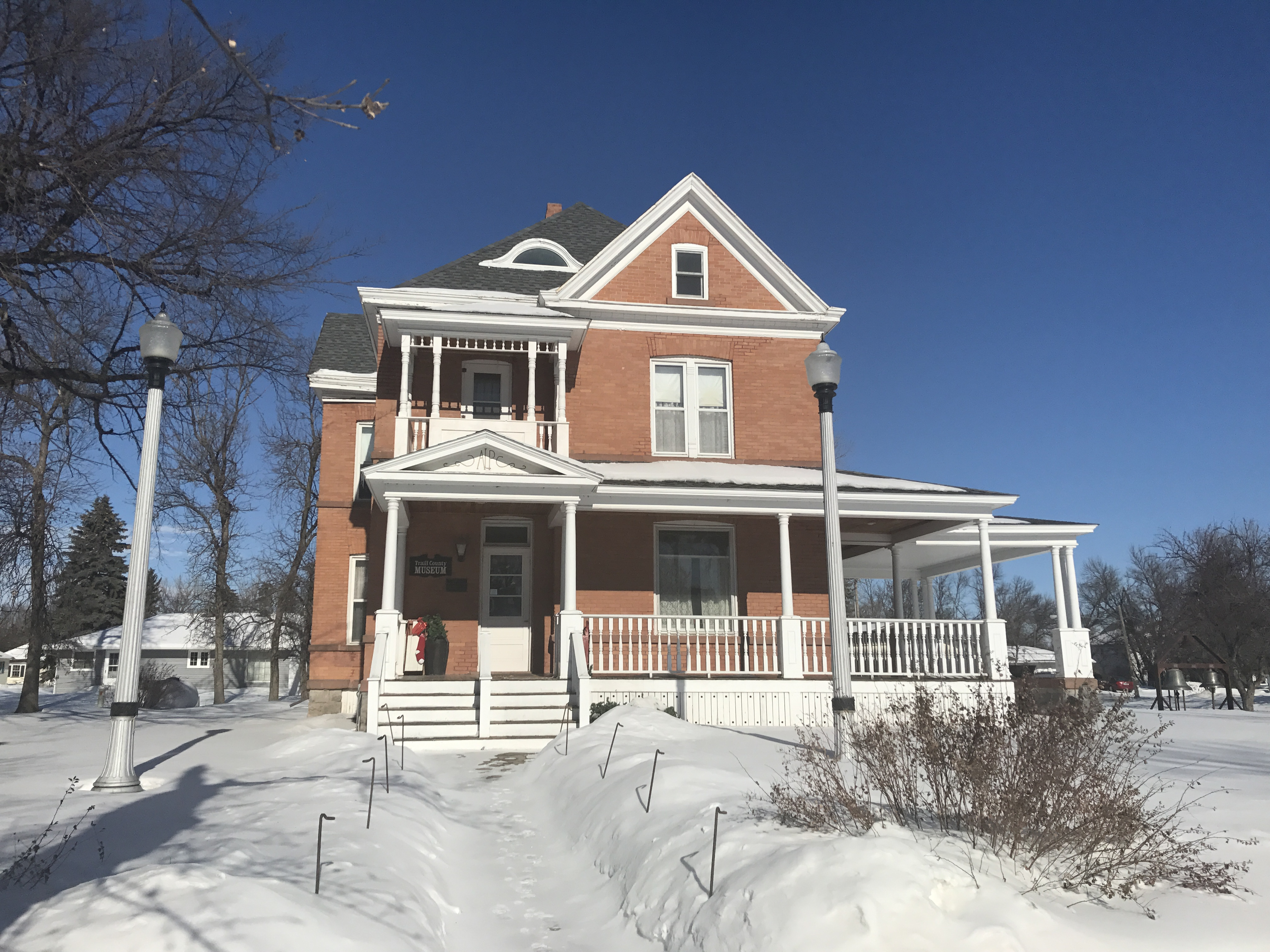

- Location within North Dakota Location within the United States
- Location: 306 W. Caledonia Ave., Hillsboro, North Dakota
- Coordinates: 47°24′11″N 97°3′58″W
- Area: less than one acre
- Built: 1897
- Architect: Ross, John W.
- Architectural style: Queen Anne
- NRHP reference No.: 95001488
- Added to NRHP: January 4, 1996

The Amos and Lillie Plummer House in Hillsboro, North Dakota, now also known as the Traill County Historical Society Museum, was built in 1897. It was listed on the National Register of Historic Places in 1996.

== History ==
It is a Queen Anne style house designed by John W. Ross. Amos L. Plummer (1836–1903) operated a general store and also farmed land in Traill County, North Dakota. In 1886, Plummer married Lillie Wilson (1860–1911). They established a bank and other businesses in Hillsboro. In 1894, Plummer was elected mayor of Hillsboro.

In 1965, the former Plummer residence was donated to the Traill County Historical Society in 1965 by the Daughters of Dakota Pioneers. It is now operated as the Traill County Historical Society Museum.
