= Rudolf Hotel =

- U.S. National Register of Historic Places
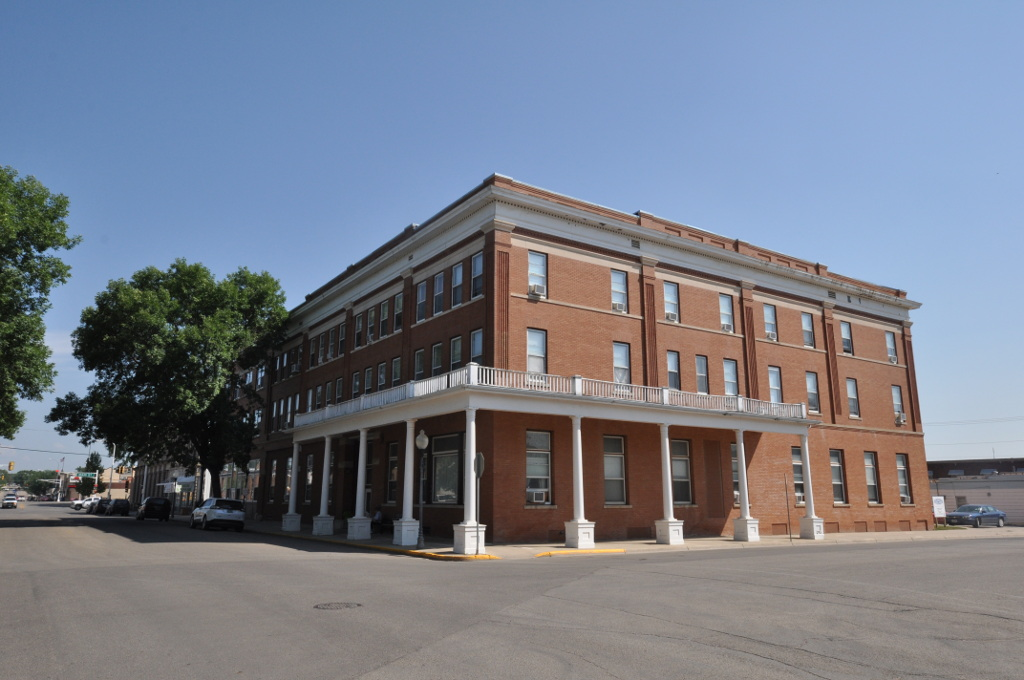
- Hotel Rudolf, 2017

- Location within North Dakota Location within the United States
- Location: Central Ave. and 2nd St., Valley City, North Dakota
- Coordinates: 46°55′21″N 98°0′9″W
- Area: less than one acre
- Built: 1907
- Architect: Ross, John W.
- Architectural style: Classical Revival
- NRHP reference No.: 83001926
- Added to NRHP: February 10, 1983

The Rudolf Hotel in Valley City, North Dakota is a three-story hotel building that was built in 1907. It was designed by John W. Ross in Classical Revival style. It was listed on the National Register of Historic Places in 1983.

Its significance recognized in the listing was for its association with Rudolph Giselius (1872-1944), for its example of work by North Dakota architect John W. Ross (1848–1914), for it being the oldest hotel in Valley City, and for its role in the local business and social community through the years. At the listing date in 1983, it had been vacant since 1977.

Its basement was site of Kiwanis Club meetings, and the first meeting of the North Dakota Aberdeen-Angus Breeders Association (in 1942).

It has since been converted to senior-living apartments, named Rudolf Square.
