= Larimore City Hall =

- U.S. National Register of Historic Places
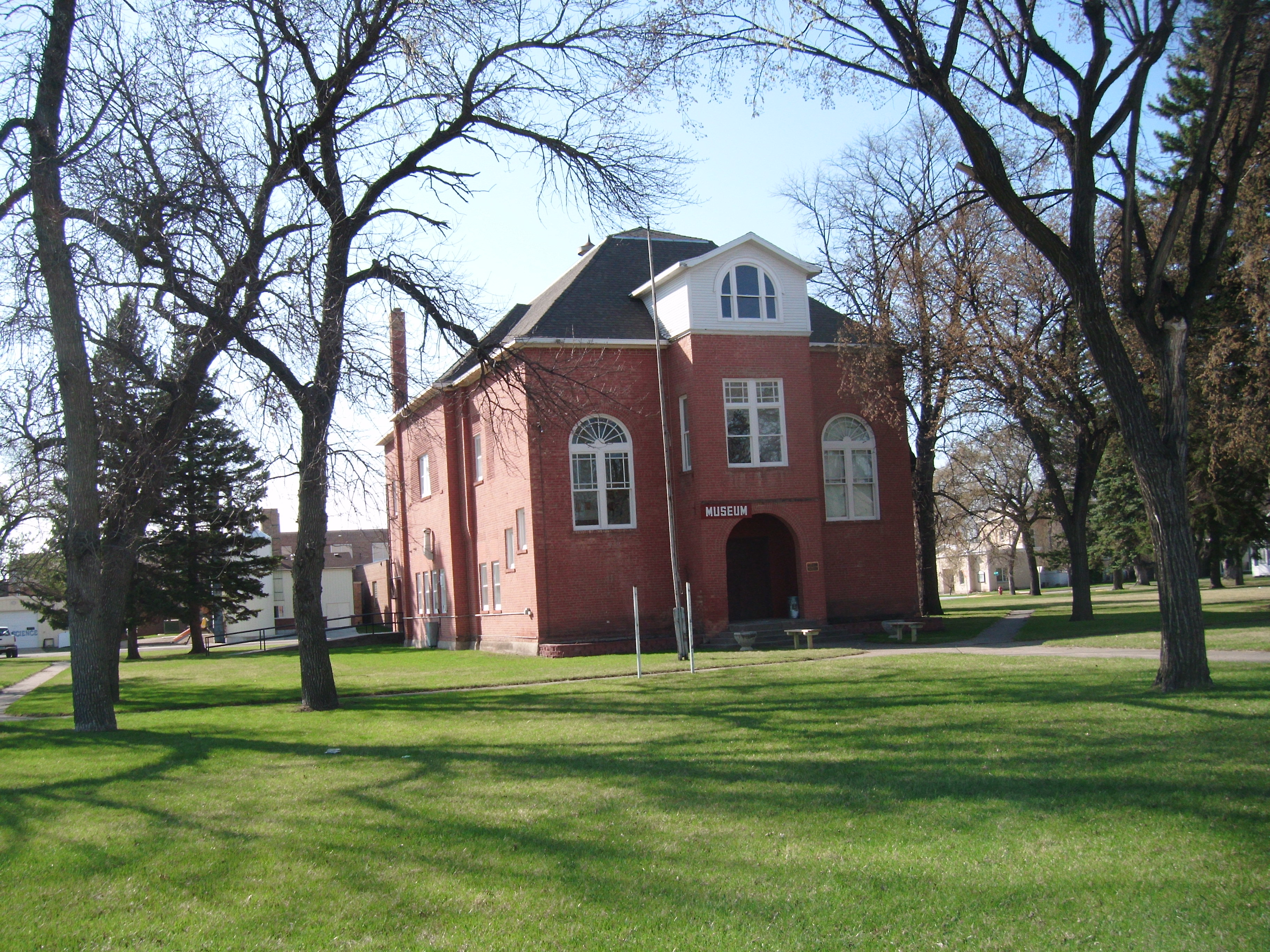

- Location within North Dakota Location within the United States
- Location: Block 64, bounded by Towner, 3rd, Terry and Main, Larimore, North Dakota
- Coordinates: 47°54′23″N 97°37′58″W
- Area: less than 1 acre (0.40 ha)
- Built: 1890
- Architect: John W. Ross
- Architectural style: Colonial Revival, Georgian Revival
- NRHP reference No.: 90000600
- Added to NRHP: May 31, 1990

The Larimore City Hall is a building in Larimore, North Dakota that was listed on the National Register of Historic Places in 1990. It "may be described as a two-and-a-half story rectangular structure of red-painted buff brick which rises to a hipped roof."

It was built in 1890, and five years later was also dubbed the Larimore Opera House, as it had by then housed multiple concerts and stage events.

It was designed by Grand Forks architect John W. Ross, the first licensed architect in the area. It was built by M.J. Moran, contractor. It was the first brick structure in the community and is the oldest surviving civic building. It includes Colonial Revival, Georgian Revival and other architecture.
