= Finks and Gokey Block =

- U.S. National Register of Historic Places
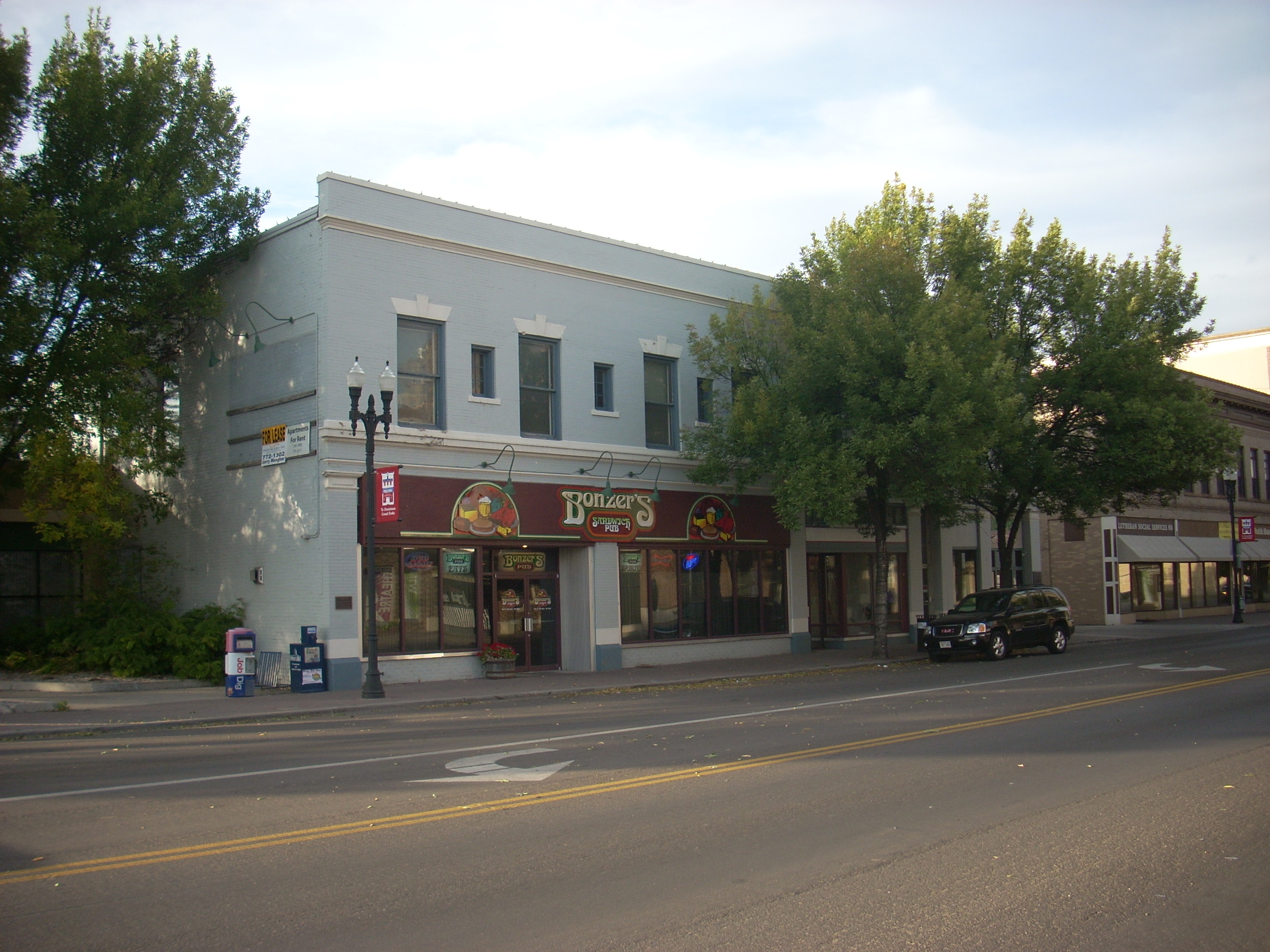
- Building in 2009

- Location within North Dakota Location within the United States
- Location: 414–420 DeMers Ave., Grand Forks, North Dakota
- Coordinates: 47°55′27″N 97°1′55″W
- Area: less than 1 acre (0.40 ha)
- Built: 1881
- MPS: Downtown Grand Forks MRA
- NRHP reference No.: 83001935
- Added to NRHP: April 20, 1983

Finks and Gokey Block, built in 1881, is "one of the earliest brick commercial buildings" in Grand Forks, North Dakota. It was listed on the National Register of Historic Places in 1983.

Its second floor was remodeled by architect John W. Ross.

The listing is described in its North Dakota Cultural Resources Survey document, and it was covered in a 1981 study of Downtown Grand Forks historical resources.
