= Beiseker Mansion =

Historic house in North Dakota, United States

- U.S. National Register of Historic Places
- Location within North Dakota Location within the United States
- Location: 2nd St. and Roberts Ave., Fessenden, North Dakota
- Coordinates: 47°38′56″N 99°37′17″W
- Area: 1.9 acres (0.77 ha)
- Built: 1899
- Built by: Beiseker, Henry J.
- Architectural style: Single Style, Queen Anne
- NRHP reference No.: 77001036
- Added to NRHP: April 13, 1977

The Beiseker Mansion in Fessenden, North Dakota was listed on the National Register of Historic Places in 1977. The listing included two contributing buildings.

== History ==
Beiseker Mansion was built in 1899. Built for Thomas Lincoln Beiseker, it has also been known as T. L. Beiseker Mansion and as Order of the Eastern Star (O.E.S.) Home. It includes Shingle Style and Queen Anne architecture. Beiseker Mansion was "described at the time of its construction as one of the finest houses in North Dakota (Wells County Free Press, July 27, 1899) [and it] has survived since then with its original architectural character remarkably intact."

Thomas Lincoln Beiseker (1866-1941) was a banker and land speculator. He was the founder of the land companies Beiseker & Davidson Ltd., and the Calgary Colonization Company. Thomas Beiseker was the namesake of Beiseker, Alberta .
