= Grand Forks Woolen Mills =

- U.S. National Register of Historic Places
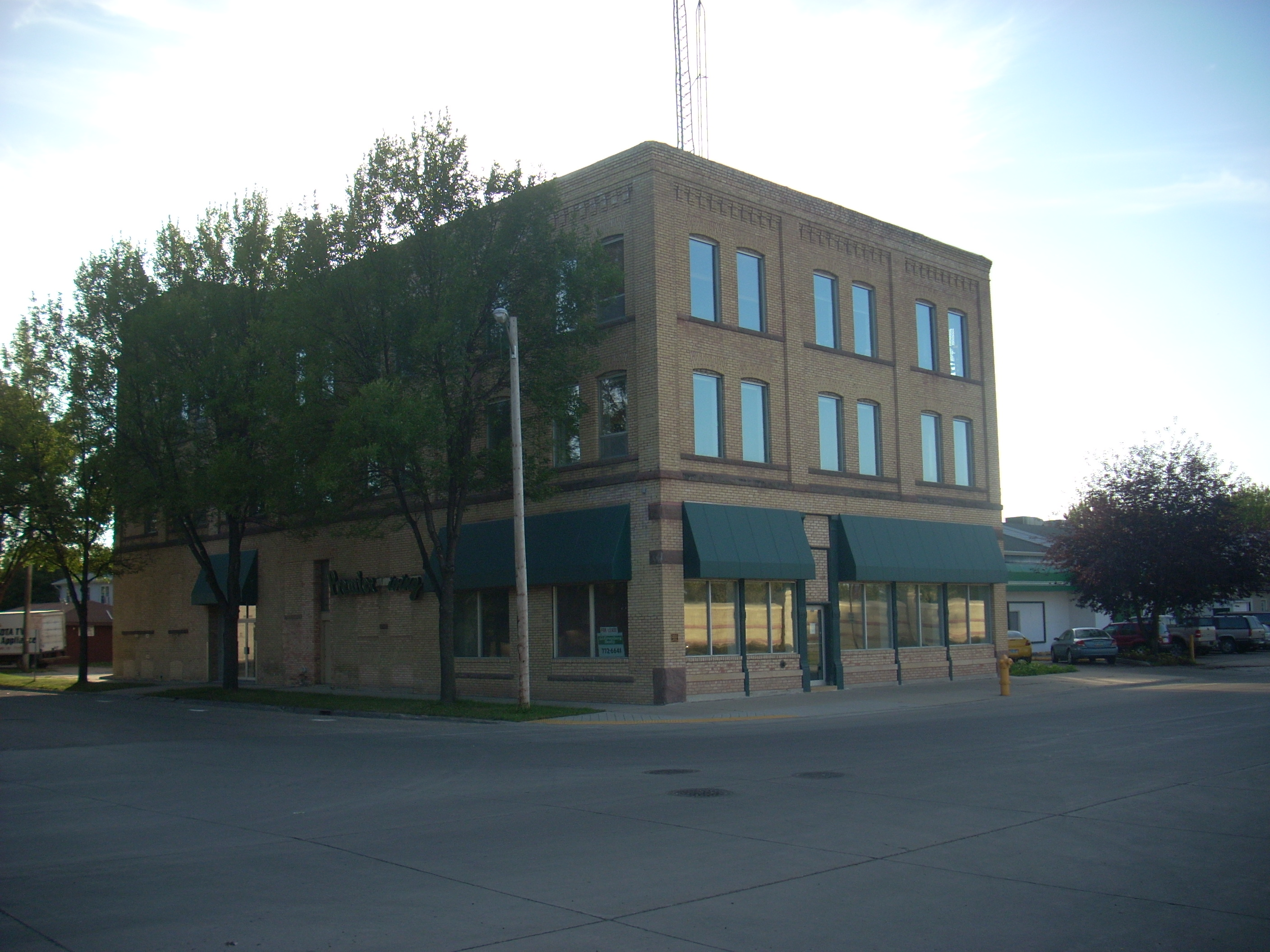

- Location within North Dakota Location within the United States
- Location: 301 N. 3rd St., Grand Forks, North Dakota
- Coordinates: 47°55′38″N 97°2′2″W
- Area: less than 1 acre (0.40 ha)
- Built: 1895
- Architect: Ross, John W.
- Architectural style: Commercial vernacular
- MPS: Downtown Grand Forks MRA
- NRHP reference No.: 83001936
- Added to NRHP: October 26, 1983

Grand Forks Woolen Mills is a building located on the corner of Third Avenue North and North Third Street in Grand Forks, North Dakota, designed by architect John W. Ross. A three-story construction approximately 50 feet (15 m) by 100 feet (30 m) in size, it is recorded as being built in 1895. Constructed of brick, the architectural style has been described as Commercial vernacular.

The building, which is at the northern extremity of the historic commercial district, was listed on the National Register of Historic Places in 1983.

== History ==
The building was constructed at a cost of US$17,000 for a woolen mill business that had started to trade in 1892. It was situated on a 100 feet (30 m) x 140 feet (43 m) plot, which was a typical size for a development area in Grand Forks at that time. It was used for various processes involved in the conversion of wool to cloth, including carding, spinning, weaving, dyeing and sewing. It also contained offices and retail space. A historical survey observed that the building was "the object of intense pride ... a local symbol of economic independence from Minnesota, and the focus of Grand Forks' hopes of becoming a manufacturing center." The presence of the mill removed the necessity to ship wool to Minneapolis for conversion, and so it enabled both higher payments to local farmers for their raw materials and lower prices to consumers.

The woolen business, which at one point employed 75 people, was a fairly short-lived venture. It ceased operations some time between 1901 and 1906 as it became impossible for it to compete with larger enterprises such as the North Star Woolen Mill in Minneapolis, its Grand Forks location being too distant both from sufficient supplies of raw wool and from consumer markets.

A single-story extension was added on the northern aspect. In 1916 the building was gutted by fire. Following the fire, the one-story addition was destroyed. However, with the walls still standing, the main building was rebuilt using a fire-proof construction method in 1918 and at that point included a concrete floor. It was then used for many years as a garage for Hanson Ford.
