= Grand Forks City Hall =

- U.S. National Register of Historic Places
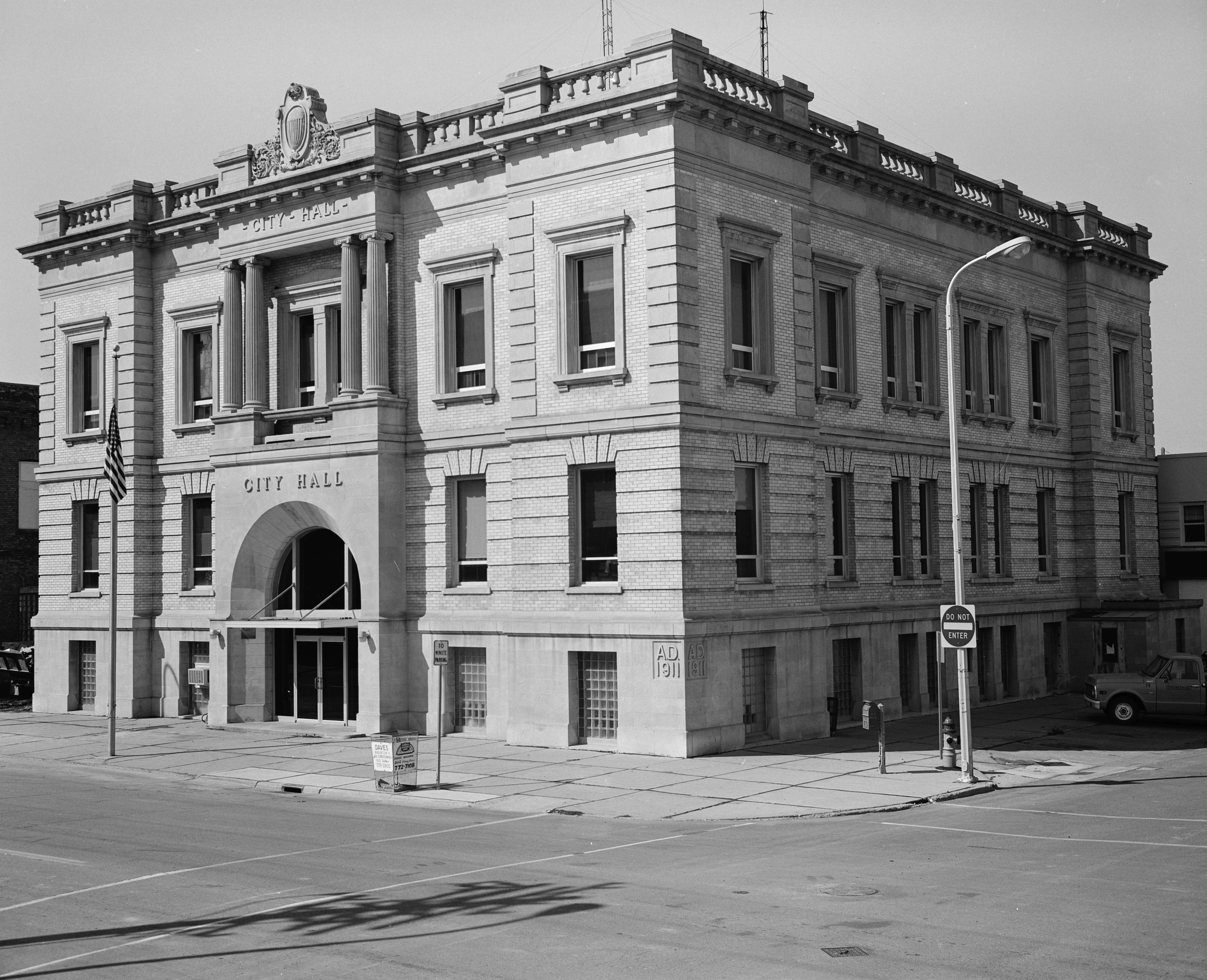
- HABS pic from 1981

- Location within North Dakota Location within the United States
- Location: 404 N. 2nd Ave., Grand Forks, North Dakota
- Coordinates: 47°55′33″N 97°2′3″W
- Area: less than 1 acre (0.40 ha)
- Built: 1911
- Architect: Ross, John W.; Northern Construction & Engineering
- Architectural style: Beaux Arts
- MPS: Downtown Grand Forks MRA
- NRHP reference No.: 82001325
- Added to NRHP: October 26, 1982

Grand Forks City Hall is a building in Grand Forks, North Dakota that was listed on the National Register of Historic Places in 1982.

It was built in 1911.

It was designed by Grand Forks architect John W. Ross and was built by Northern Construction & Engineering.

In a 1981 survey of Downtown Grand Forks historical resources, it was stated this building "is pure Beaux Arts. Rather small in scale and only two storeys over a raised basement, the City Hall is faced with ashlar and was similar in mass, style, and materials to the recently razed Carnegie Library which was located nearby."

The listing was for an area of less than one acre with just the one building.
