= Wells County Fairgrounds =

Coordinates: 47°38′39.44″N 99°37′36.8″W

- U.S. National Register of Historic Places
- U.S. Historic district
- Location within North Dakota Location within the United States
- Location: Jct. of US 52 and ND 15, Fessenden, North Dakota
- Area: 35 acres (14 ha)
- NRHP reference No.: 91000073
- Added to NRHP: February 28, 1991

The Wells County Fairgrounds in Fessenden, North Dakota was listed on the National Register of Historic Places in 1991. The listing included 18 contributing buildings and one other contributing object on 35 acres (14 ha).

It includes a horse barn and many other individual features.

== Wells County Museum ==
The Wells County Museum, operated by the Wells County Historical Society, occupies one of the buildings at the fairgrounds.

Displays include pioneer tools and household artifacts, farm equipment, jewelry, clothing, Native American artifacts, tools, dollhouses, weapons, dresses, Norwegian artifacts, newspapers and antique vehicles. The Pony Gulch County School is also available to tour.

The museum is open during the fair and at other times by appointment.
