= Hamberg, North Dakota =

- City
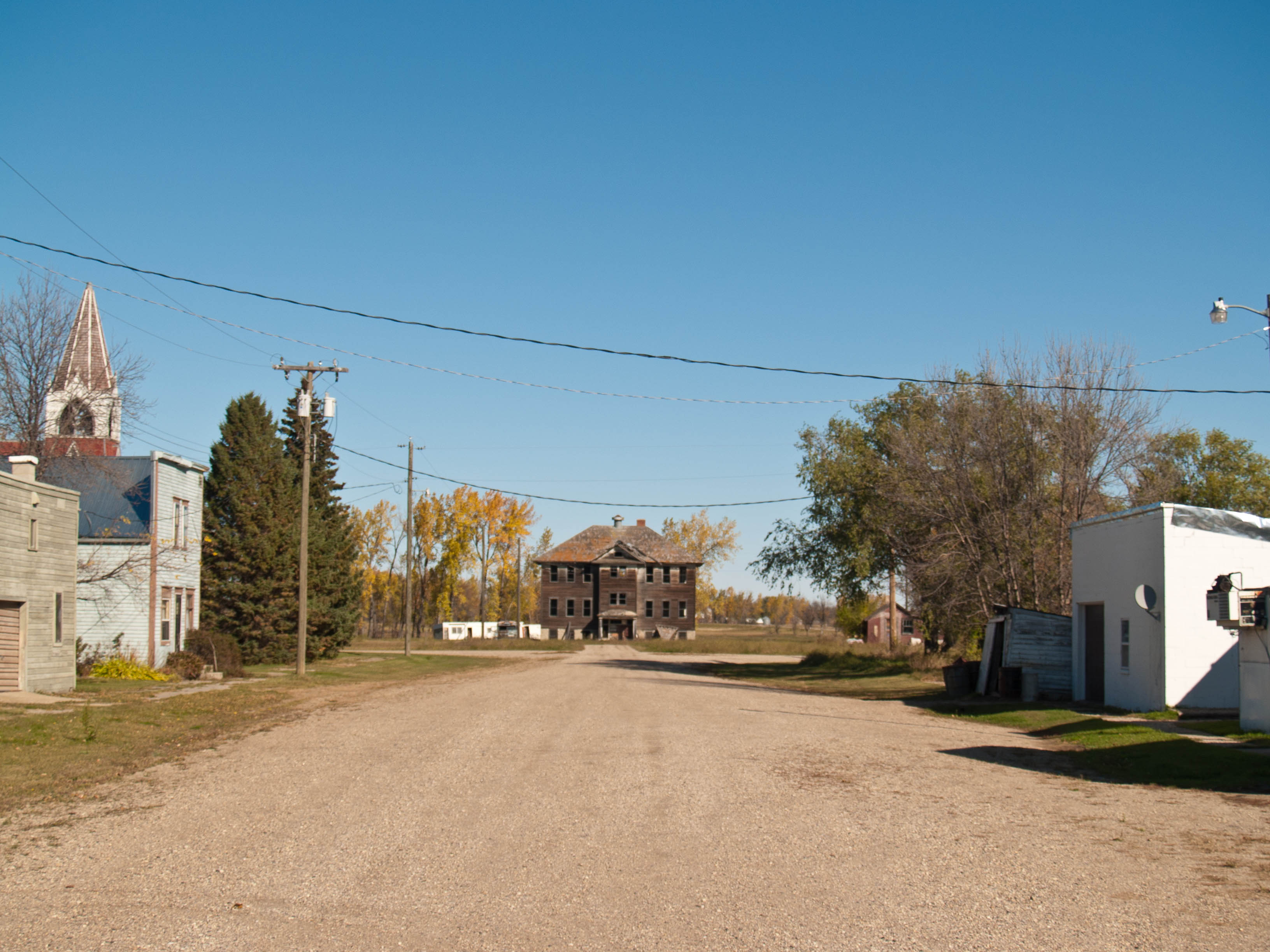
- Buildings in Hamberg

- Location of Hamberg, North Dakota
- Coordinates: 47°45′48″N 99°30′57″W
- Country: United States
- State: North Dakota
- County: Wells
- Founded: 1910

Area
  - Total: 0.41 sq mi (1.05 km^{2})
  - Land: 0.41 sq mi (1.05 km^{2})
  - Water: 0 sq mi (0.00 km^{2})
- Elevation: 1,549 ft (472 m)

Population (2020)
  - Total: 11
  - Estimate (2024): 12
  - Density: 27.0/sq mi (10.43/km^{2})
- Time zone: UTC–6 (Central (CST))
  - Summer (DST): UTC–5 (CDT)
- ZIP Code: 58337
- Area code: 701
- FIPS code: 38-34460
- GNIS feature ID: 1036074

Hamberg is a city in Wells County, North Dakota, United States. The population was 11 at the 2020 census.

== Geography ==
According to the United States Census Bureau, the city has a total area of 0.40 square miles (1.04 km^{2}), all land.

== Demographics ==
Historical population
Census	Pop.	Note	%±
1930	187		—
1940	164		−12.3%
1950	124		−24.4%
1960	64		−48.4%
1970	51		−20.3%
1980	41		−19.6%
1990	19		−53.7%
2000	28		47.4%
2010	21		−25.0%
2020	11		−47.6%
2024 (est.)	12		9.1%
U.S. Decennial Census; 2020 Census

=== 2010 census ===
As of the census of 2010, there were 21 people, 11 households, and 5 families residing in the city. The population density was 52.5 inhabitants per square mile (20.3/km^{2}). There were 15 housing units at an average density of 37.5 per square mile (14.5/km^{2}). The racial makeup of the city was 100.0% White.

There were 11 households, of which 9.1% had children under the age of 18 living with them, 36.4% were married couples living together, 9.1% had a male householder with no wife present, and 54.5% were non-families. 54.5% of all households were made up of individuals, and 18.2% had someone living alone who was 65 years of age or older. The average household size was 1.91 and the average family size was 3.00.

The median age in the city was 56.3 years. 9.5% of residents were under the age of 18; 4.9% were between the ages of 18 and 24; 14.3% were from 25 to 44; 38% were from 45 to 64; and 33.3% were 65 years of age or older. The gender makeup of the city was 71.4% male and 28.6% female.

=== 2000 census ===
As of the census of 2000, there were 28 people, 13 households, and 6 families. The population density was 72.3 inhabitants per square mile (27.9/km^{2}). There were 15 housing units at an average density of 38.7 per square mile (14.9/km^{2}). The racial makeup of the city was 100.00% White.

There were 13 households, out of which 23.1% had children under the age of 18 living with them, 38.5% were married couples living together, 7.7% had a female householder with no husband present, and 46.2% were non-families. 46.2% of all households were made up of individuals, and 23.1% had someone living alone who was 65 years of age or older. The average household size was 2.15 and the average family size was 3.14.

In the city, the population was spread out, with 14.3% under the age of 18, 14.3% from 18 to 24, 21.4% from 25 to 44, 28.6% from 45 to 64, and 21.4% who were 65 years of age or older. The median age was 45 years. For every 100 females, there were 180.0 males. For every 100 females age 18 and over, there were 200.0 males.

The median income for a household in the city was $28,750, and the median income for a family was $29,375. Males had a median income of $21,250 versus $0 for females. The per capita income for the city was $30,100. There were no families and 28.6% of the population living below the poverty line, including no under eighteens and none of those over 64.
