= Wells County, North Dakota =

County in North Dakota, United States

- County
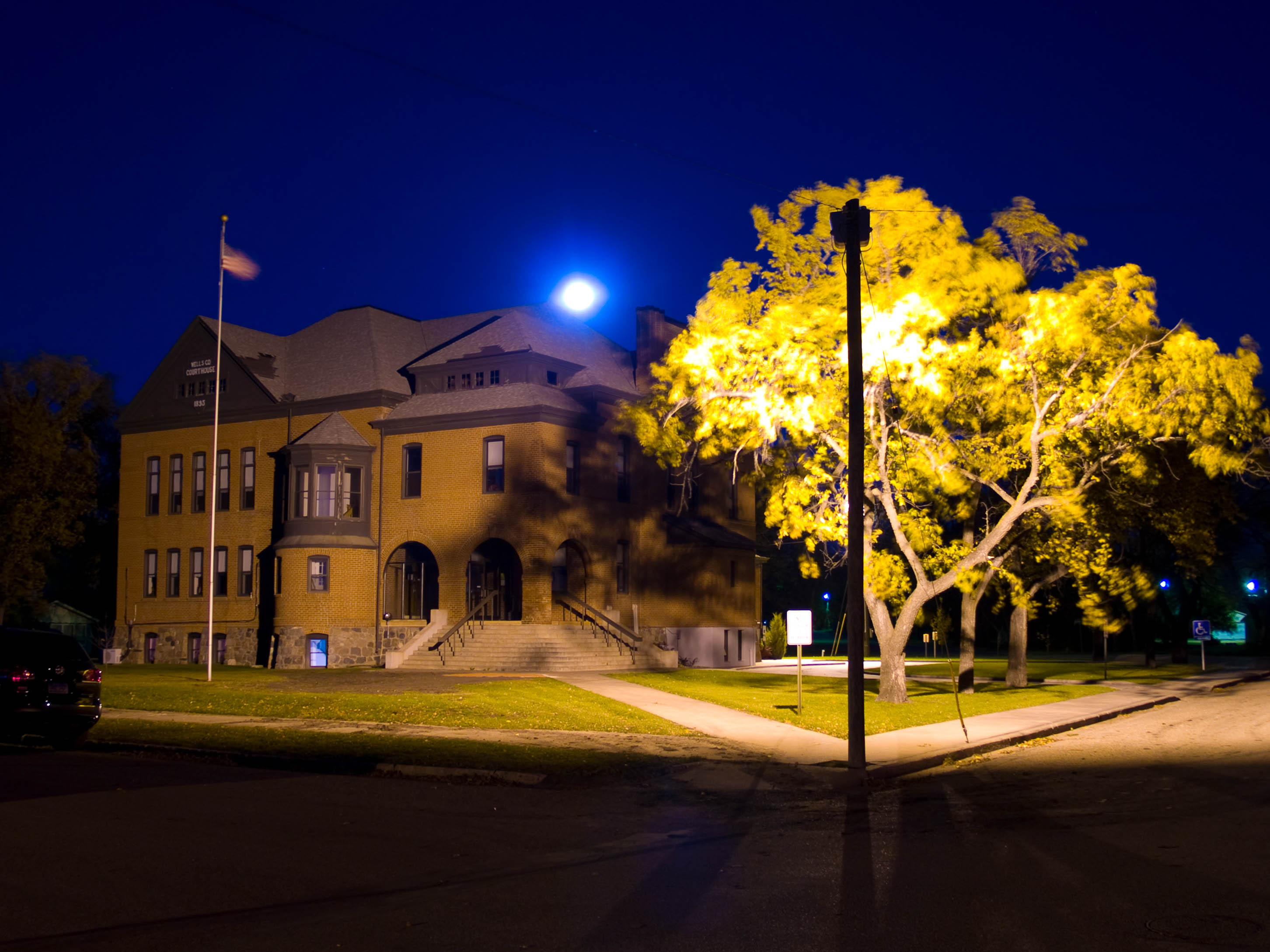
- The Wells County Courthouse in Fessenden

- Location within the U.S. state of North Dakota
- Coordinates: 47.580851°N 99.682213°W
- Country: United States
- State: North Dakota
- Founded: January 4, 1873 (created); August 28, 1884 (organized)
- Named for: Edward Payson Wells
- Seat: Fessenden
- Largest city: Harvey

Area
  - Total: 1,290.289 sq mi (3,341.83 km^{2})
  - Land: 1,270.533 sq mi (3,290.67 km^{2})
  - Water: 19.756 sq mi (51.17 km^{2}) 1.53%

Population (2020)
  - Total: 3,982
  - Estimate (2025): 3,729 ▼
  - Density: 2.994/sq mi (1.156/km^{2})
- Time zone: UTC−6 (Central)
  - Summer (DST): UTC−5 (CDT)
- Area code: 701
- Congressional district: At-large
- Website: wellscountynd.com

Wells County is a county in the U.S. state of North Dakota. As of the 2020 census, the population was 3,982, and was estimated to be 3,729 in 2025. The county seat is Fessenden and the largest city is Harvey.

== History ==
The Dakota Territory legislature created the county on January 4, 1873. Its government was not organized at that time, nor was it attached for administrative or judicial purposes to another county. It was named Gingras County; this name continued until February 26, 1881, when the name was changed to Wells County, named for Edward Payson Wells, a Jamestown banker, early promoter of the James River Valley, and member of the legislature in 1881.

The county government was organized on August 28, 1884, with Sykeston as the county seat. In 1894 the county seat was transferred to Fessendon. The county boundary was altered in 1883 when a parcel was transferred to Foster County and again in 1885 when it received land from Foster County. Its boundary has remained unchanged since 1885.

The center of population of North Dakota is located in the extreme southeastern corner of Wells County, about 9 miles (14 km) southeast of Sykeston.

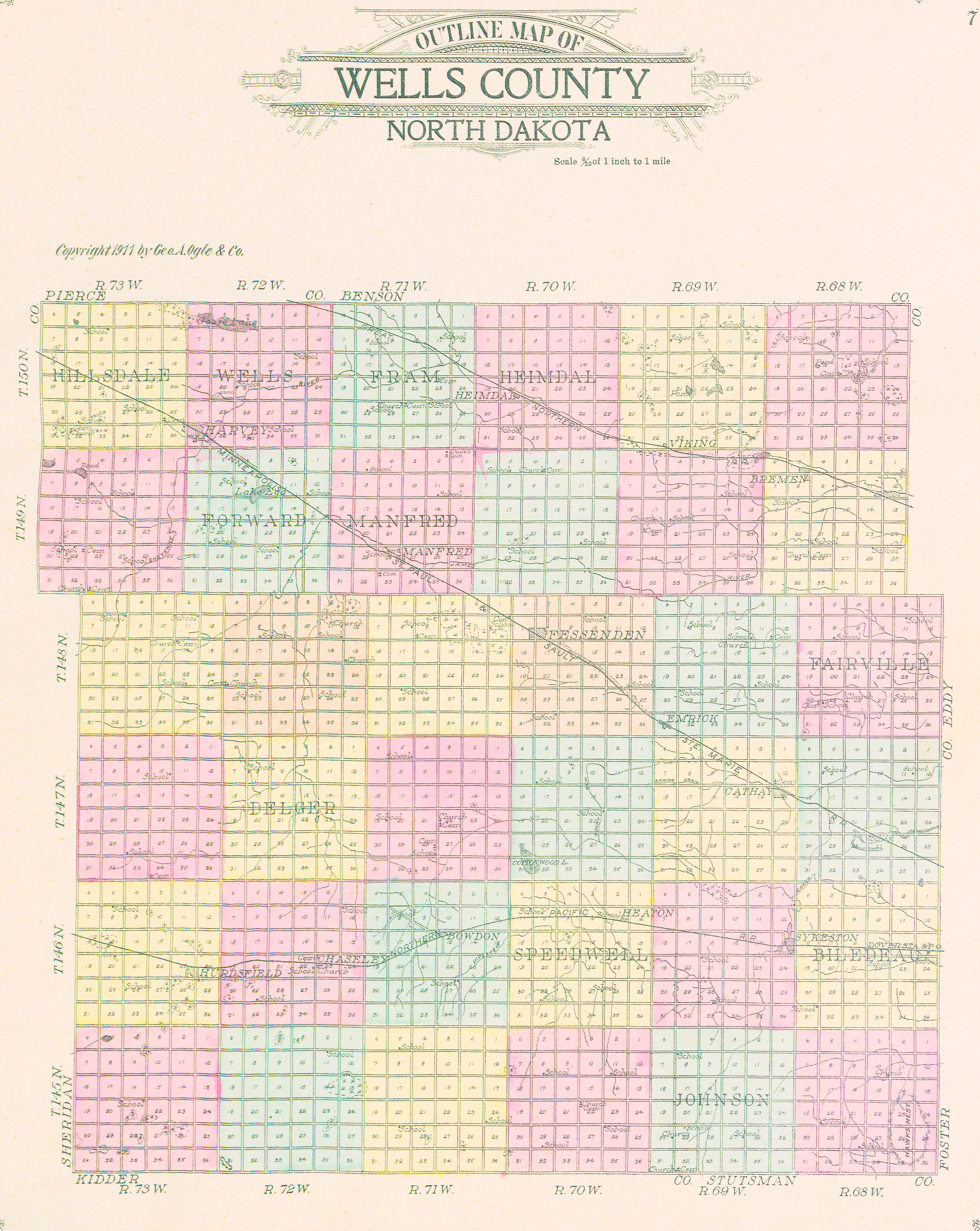
Outline map of Wells County, North Dakota, 1911

== Geography ==
The James River flows east-northeasterly through Wells County. The county terrain consists of rolling hills with occasional protuberances, dotted with lakes and ponds in its SW portion. The terrain slopes to the east and north; its highest point is a protuberance near the southwestern corner, at 2,182 ft (665 m) ASL.

According to the United States Census Bureau, the county has a total area of 1,290.289 square miles (3,341.83 km^{2}), of which 1,270.533 square miles (3,290.67 km^{2}) is land and 19.756 square miles (51.17 km^{2}) (1.53%) is water. It is the 23rd largest county in North Dakota by total area.

=== Major highways ===
- U.S. Highway 52
- US 52 Bus.
- North Dakota Highway 3
- North Dakota Highway 15
- North Dakota Highway 30
- North Dakota Highway 91
- North Dakota Highway 200
- County 1
- County 5
- Wells County Route 52

=== Adjacent counties ===
- Benson County - north
- Eddy County - east
- Foster County - east
- Stutsman County - southeast
- Kidder County - south
- Sheridan County - west
- Pierce County - northwest

=== Protected areas ===
- Karl T. Frederick State Game Management Area
- Upland State Game Refuge

=== Lakes ===
- Big Slough
- Crystal Lake
- Egg Lake
- Lake Hiawatha
- Lake Ontario
- Silver Lake
- Sorenson Lake

== Demographics ==
Historical population
Census	Pop.	Note	%±
1890	1,212		—
1900	8,310		585.6%
1910	11,814		42.2%
1920	12,957		9.7%
1930	13,285		2.5%
1940	11,198		−15.7%
1950	10,417		−7.0%
1960	9,237		−11.3%
1970	7,847		−15.0%
1980	6,979		−11.1%
1990	5,864		−16.0%
2000	5,102		−13.0%
2010	4,207		−17.5%
2020	3,982		−5.3%
2025 (est.)	3,729	▼	−6.4%
U.S. Decennial Census; 1790–1960 1900–1990; 1990–2000 2010–2020

As of the fourth quarter of 2024, the median home value in Wells County was $112,737.

As of the 2023 American Community Survey, there are 1,808 estimated households in Wells County with an average of 2.12 persons per household. The county has a median household income of $61,346. Approximately 12.1% of the county's population lives at or below the poverty line. Wells County has an estimated 59.6% employment rate, with 22.3% of the population holding a bachelor's degree or higher and 91.8% holding a high school diploma.

The top five reported ancestries (people were allowed to report up to two ancestries, thus the figures will generally add to more than 100%) were English (97.5%), Spanish (0.9%), Indo-European (1.2%), Asian and Pacific Islander (0.3%), and Other (0.1%).

The median age in the county was 47.9 years.

Wells County, North Dakota – racial and ethnic composition
Note: the US Census treats Hispanic/Latino as an ethnic category. This table excludes Latinos from the racial categories and assigns them to a separate category. Hispanics/Latinos may be of any race.

Race / ethnicity (NH = non-Hispanic)	Pop. 1980	Pop. 1990	Pop. 2000	Pop. 2010	Pop. 2020
White alone (NH)	6,949 (99.57%)	5,846 (99.69%)	5,044 (98.86%)	4,143 (98.48%)	3,784 (95.03%)
Black or African American alone (NH)	0 (0.00%)	2 (0.03%)	7 (0.14%)	3 (0.07%)	18 (0.45%)
Native American or Alaska Native alone (NH)	7 (0.10%)	6 (0.10%)	12 (0.24%)	13 (0.31%)	17 (0.43%)
Asian alone (NH)	3 (0.04%)	3 (0.05%)	12 (0.24%)	4 (0.10%)	12 (0.30%)
Pacific Islander alone (NH)	—	—	0 (0.00%)	0 (0.00%)	0 (0.00%)
Other race alone (NH)	1 (0.01%)	0 (0.00%)	0 (0.00%)	0 (0.00%)	4 (0.10%)
Mixed race or multiracial (NH)	—	—	12 (0.24%)	23 (0.55%)	109 (2.74%)
Hispanic or Latino (any race)	19 (0.27%)	7 (0.12%)	15 (0.29%)	21 (0.50%)	38 (0.95%)
Total	6,979 (100.00%)	5,864 (100.00%)	5,102 (100.00%)	4,207 (100.00%)	3,982 (100.00%)

=== 2024 estimate ===
As of the 2024 estimate, there were 3,803 people and 1,808 households residing in the county. There were 2,330 housing units at an average density of 1.83 per square mile (0.7/km^{2}). The racial makeup of the county was 97.1% White (95.7% NH White), 0.2% African American, 0.8% Native American, 0.4% Asian, 0.0% Pacific Islander, _% from some other races and 1.4% from two or more races. Hispanic or Latino people of any race were 1.7% of the population.

=== 2020 census ===
As of the 2020 census, there were 3,982 people, 1,852 households, and 1,107 families residing in the county. The population density was 3.13 inhabitants per square mile (1.2/km^{2}). There were 2,338 housing units at an average density of 1.84 per square mile (0.7/km^{2}).

Of the residents, 20.1% were under the age of 18 and 28.6% were 65 years of age or older; the median age was 52.4 years. For every 100 females there were 99.4 males, and for every 100 females age 18 and over there were 98.1 males. Of the 1,852 households, 20.6% had children under the age of 18 living with them and 24.5% had a female householder with no spouse or partner present. About 37.5% of all households were made up of individuals and 18.9% had someone living alone who was 65 years of age or older.

There were 2,338 housing units, of which 20.8% were vacant. Among occupied housing units, 80.1% were owner-occupied and 19.9% were renter-occupied. The homeowner vacancy rate was 4.0% and the rental vacancy rate was 17.2%.

The racial makeup of the county was 95.5% White, 0.5% Black or African American, 0.4% American Indian and Alaska Native, 0.3% Asian, 0.3% from some other race, and 3.1% from two or more races. Hispanic or Latino residents of any race comprised 1.0% of the population.

=== 2010 census ===
As of the 2010 census, there were 4,207 people, 1,943 households, and 1,223 families residing in the county. The population density was 3.31 inhabitants per square mile (1.3/km^{2}). There were 2,481 housing units at an average density of 1.95 per square mile (0.8/km^{2}). The racial makeup of the county was 98.88% White, 0.07% African American, 0.31% Native American, 0.10% Asian, 0.02% Pacific Islander, 0.05% from some other races and 0.57% from two or more races. Hispanic or Latino people of any race were 0.50% of the population.

In terms of ancestry, 65.9% were German, 25.9% were Norwegian, 6.7% were Irish, and 1.8% were American.

Of the 1,943 households, 19.7% had children under the age of 18 living with them, 54.1% were married couples living together, 5.6% had a female householder with no husband present, 37.1% were non-families, and 34.3% of all households were made up of individuals. The average household size was 2.10 and the average family size was 2.67. The median age was 51.5 years.

The median income for a household in the county was $40,136 and the median income for a family was $52,400. Males had a median income of $38,442 versus $25,597 for females. The per capita income for the county was $23,531. About 6.1% of families and 10.3% of the population were below the poverty line, including 12.5% of those under age 18 and 17.1% of those age 65 or over.

== Communities ==
=== Cities ===
- Bowdon
- Cathay
- Fessenden (county seat)
- Hamberg
- Harvey
- Hurdsfield
- Sykeston

=== Census-designated place ===
- Heimdal

=== Unincorporated communities ===
- Bremen
- Chaseley
- Dover
- Emrick
- Heaton (ghost town)
- Manfred
- Wellsburg

=== Townships ===
- Berlin
- Bilodeau
- Bremen
- Bull Moose
- Cathay
- Chaseley
- Crystal Lake
- Delger
- Fairville
- Forward
- Fram
- Germantown
- Haaland
- Hamburg
- Hawksnest
- Heimdal
- Hillsdale
- Johnson
- Lynn
- Manfred
- Norway Lake
- Oshkosh
- Pony Gulch
- Progress
- Rusland
- Saint Anna
- Silver Lake
- South Cottonwood
- Speedwell
- Sykeston
- Valhalla
- Wells
- West Norway
- West Ontario
- Western
- Woodward

== Politics ==
Wells County voters have been Republican-leaning for several decades. In no national election since 1964 has the county selected the Democratic Party candidate.

United States presidential election results for Wells County, North Dakota
Year	Republican		Democratic		Third party(ies)	
Year	No.	%	No.	%	No.	%
1900	966	69.90%	388	28.08%	28	2.03%
1904	1,330	80.90%	209	12.71%	105	6.39%
1908	1,243	68.07%	535	29.30%	48	2.63%
1912	356	23.58%	494	32.72%	660	43.71%
1916	1,226	58.58%	810	38.70%	57	2.72%
1920	3,202	85.71%	456	12.21%	78	2.09%
1924	1,644	44.40%	138	3.73%	1,921	51.88%
1928	2,364	52.39%	2,123	47.05%	25	0.55%
1932	1,062	21.50%	3,823	77.40%	54	1.09%
1936	1,263	23.84%	3,114	58.78%	921	17.38%
1940	3,335	63.74%	1,878	35.89%	19	0.36%
1944	2,529	61.59%	1,557	37.92%	20	0.49%
1948	2,385	59.83%	1,492	37.43%	109	2.73%
1952	3,709	77.89%	1,016	21.34%	37	0.78%
1956	2,912	66.87%	1,434	32.93%	9	0.21%
1960	2,641	58.24%	1,885	41.57%	9	0.20%
1964	1,875	44.76%	2,314	55.24%	0	0.00%
1968	2,266	59.92%	1,265	33.45%	251	6.64%
1972	2,519	64.42%	1,297	33.17%	94	2.40%
1976	1,941	51.53%	1,742	46.24%	84	2.23%
1980	2,660	73.91%	746	20.73%	193	5.36%
1984	2,426	69.20%	1,036	29.55%	44	1.25%
1988	1,901	58.65%	1,317	40.64%	23	0.71%
1992	1,171	40.16%	888	30.45%	857	29.39%
1996	1,192	46.89%	962	37.84%	388	15.26%
2000	1,610	66.80%	661	27.43%	139	5.77%
2004	1,654	64.58%	858	33.50%	49	1.91%
2008	1,468	61.76%	841	35.38%	68	2.86%
2012	1,654	69.53%	673	28.29%	52	2.19%
2016	1,796	75.37%	419	17.58%	168	7.05%
2020	1,893	79.74%	442	18.62%	39	1.64%
2024	1,815	80.56%	405	17.98%	33	1.46%

== See also ==
- National Register of Historic Places listings in Wells County, North Dakota
