= Heaton, North Dakota =

- Unincorporated community
- Location within the state of North Dakota Heaton (the United States)
- Coordinates: 47°28′42″N 99°32′52″W
- Country: United States
- State: North Dakota
- County: Wells
- Elevation: 1,706 ft (520 m)

Population (2000)
  - Total: 1
- Time zone: UTC-6 (Central (CST))
  - Summer (DST): UTC-5 (CDT)
- ZIP codes: 58418
- Area code: 701
- GNIS feature ID: 1029377

Heaton is an unincorporated community in Wells County, North Dakota, United States. It is located 20 miles west of Carrington. Heaton was heavily damaged by a tornado in 1910, and some blame the decline of the town on that event. The storm killed two people and destroyed both of the town's grain elevators, and demolished the hardware store, the pool hall, the city hall, the depot, and many residences. Nonetheless, by 1930 Heaton's population was 400, double the population it had before the 1910 tornado, suggesting that the tornado was not the cause of the community's decline.

Anti-government tax protester Gordon Kahl was born in Heaton.

Starting in the late 1990s, and picking up speed in the mid-late 2000s, all remaining abandoned buildings on the townsite have been demolished, one by one. The reason is said to be because many of the properties were forfeited to the county due to unpaid property taxes, and Speedwell township took over and razed many of the properties due to health hazards. The former gas station was purchased and turned into a meat processing business, Miller Game Processing. As of 2016, the town population was 1.
