= Death & Taxes (film) =

- Directed by: Jeffrey J. Jackson
- Written by: Jeffrey J. Jackson
- Release date: 1993
- Running time: 113 minutes
- Country: United States
- Language: English

Death & Taxes is a 1993 documentary film directed by Jeffrey F. Jackson about Gordon Kahl, a tax protester who was killed in a shootout with local law enforcement officials in Smithville, Arkansas in 1983.

== Synopsis ==
The documentary focuses on Kahl, a tax protester that was killed as part of a shootout in Arkansas in 1983. It utilized interviews and archive material, as well as footage from Kahl's exhumation and the 1991 made-for-TV movie In the Line of Duty: Manhunt in the Dakotas starring Rod Steiger.

== Reception ==
Variety reviewed the documentary, writing that it was "a hard-hitting reinvestigation of the 1983 Gordon Kahl case, about which questions still linger. Jackson's unfazed, investigative reporting style approach and inventive handling of familiar material make this a controversial item for fests and progressive webs." Billboard also looked at the film and noted that it "has only a slim potential audience, but provides plenty of fodder for those interested in its subject matter."
