= Pisek, North Dakota =

- City
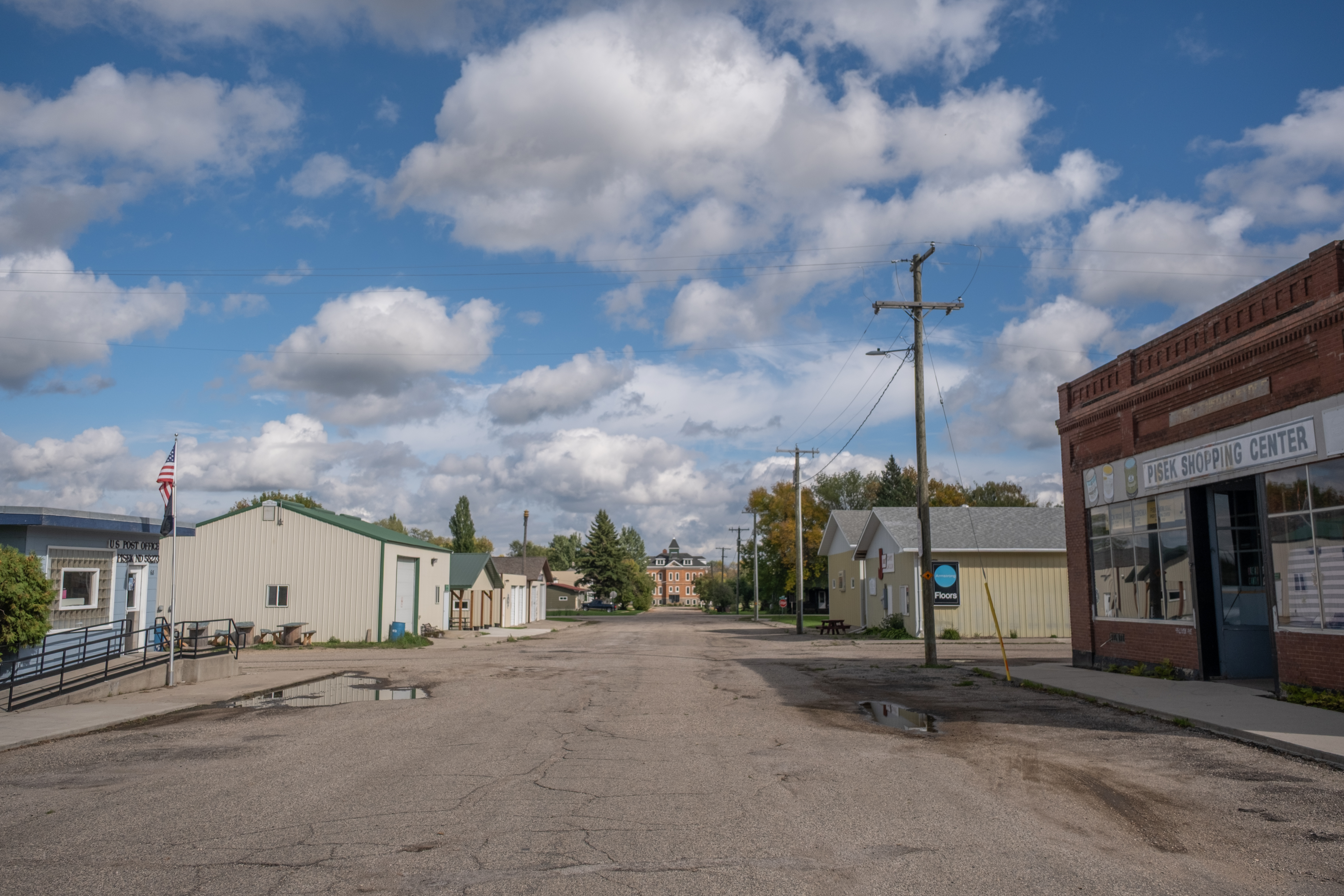
- Lovcik Ave.

- Location of Pisek, North Dakota
- Coordinates: 48°18′38″N 97°42′37″W
- Country: United States
- State: North Dakota
- County: Walsh
- Founded: 1882

Area
  - Total: 0.12 sq mi (0.30 km^{2})
  - Land: 0.12 sq mi (0.30 km^{2})
  - Water: 0 sq mi (0.00 km^{2})
- Elevation: 988 ft (301 m)

Population (2020)
  - Total: 89
  - Estimate (2022): 88
  - Density: 778/sq mi (300.4/km^{2})
- Time zone: UTC-6 (Central (CST))
  - Summer (DST): UTC-5 (CDT)
- ZIP code: 58273
- Area code: 701
- FIPS code: 38-62780
- GNIS feature ID: 1036223
- Website: www.piseknd.gov

Pisek (/ˈpiːsɪk/ PEES-ik) is a city in Walsh County, North Dakota, United States. The population was 89 at the 2020 census.

== History ==
Pisek was founded in 1882 by Bohemian settlers who had come from the town of Písek in the modern Czech Republic. Additionally, as Pisek means "sand" in Czech, the name of the new city may have also been influenced by a sand ridge that is located nearby. The Pisek School was founded in 1913.

== Geography ==
According to the United States Census Bureau, the city has a total area of 0.12 square miles (0.31 km^{2}), all land.

== Demographics ==
Historical population
Census	Pop.	Note	%±
1900	132		—
1910	312		136.4%
1920	300		−3.8%
1930	225		−25.0%
1940	242		7.6%
1950	215		−11.2%
1960	176		−18.1%
1970	154		−12.5%
1980	156		1.3%
1990	130		−16.7%
2000	96		−26.2%
2010	106		10.4%
2020	89		−16.0%
2022 (est.)	88		−1.1%
U.S. Decennial Census; 2020 Census

=== 2010 census ===
As of the census of 2010, there were 106 people, 51 households, and 28 families living in the city. The population density was 883.3 inhabitants per square mile (341.0/km^{2}). There were 60 housing units at an average density of 500.0 per square mile (193.1/km^{2}). The racial makeup of the city was 93.4% White, 4.7% Native American, and 1.9% from two or more races. Hispanic or Latino of any race were 2.8% of the population.

There were 51 households, of which 23.5% had children under the age of 18 living with them, 39.2% were married couples living together, 3.9% had a female householder with no husband present, 11.8% had a male householder with no wife present, and 45.1% were non-families. 43.1% of all households were made up of individuals, and 15.7% had someone living alone who was 65 years of age or older. The average household size was 2.08 and the average family size was 2.79.

The median age in the city was 38.7 years. 23.6% of residents were under the age of 18; 6.5% were between the ages of 18 and 24; 27.3% were from 25 to 44; 26.4% were from 45 to 64; and 16% were 65 years of age or older. The gender makeup of the city was 52.8% male and 47.2% female.

=== 2000 census ===
As of the census of 2000, there were 96 people, 48 households, and 27 families living in the city. The population density was 825.6 inhabitants per square mile (318.8/km^{2}). There were 60 housing units at an average density of 516.0 per square mile (199.2/km^{2}). The racial makeup of the city was 96.88% White, 1.04% Native American, 2.08% from other races. Hispanic or Latino of any race were 2.08% of the population.

There were 48 households, out of which 16.7% had children under the age of 18 living with them, 54.2% were married couples living together, and 41.7% were non-families. 41.7% of all households were made up of individuals, and 25.0% had someone living alone who was 65 years of age or older. The average household size was 2.00 and the average family size was 2.71.

In the city, the population was spread out, with 15.6% under the age of 18, 5.2% from 18 to 24, 25.0% from 25 to 44, 24.0% from 45 to 64, and 30.2% who were 65 years of age or older. The median age was 47 years. For every 100 females, there were 92.0 males. For every 100 females age 18 and over, there were 88.4 males.

The median income for a household in the city was $38,125, and the median income for a family was $40,625. Males had a median income of $27,500 versus $18,125 for females. The per capita income for the city was $31,215. There were no families and 3.4% of the population living below the poverty line, including no under eighteens and 15.0% of those over 64.
