= Wells County Courthouse (North Dakota) =

- U.S. National Register of Historic Places
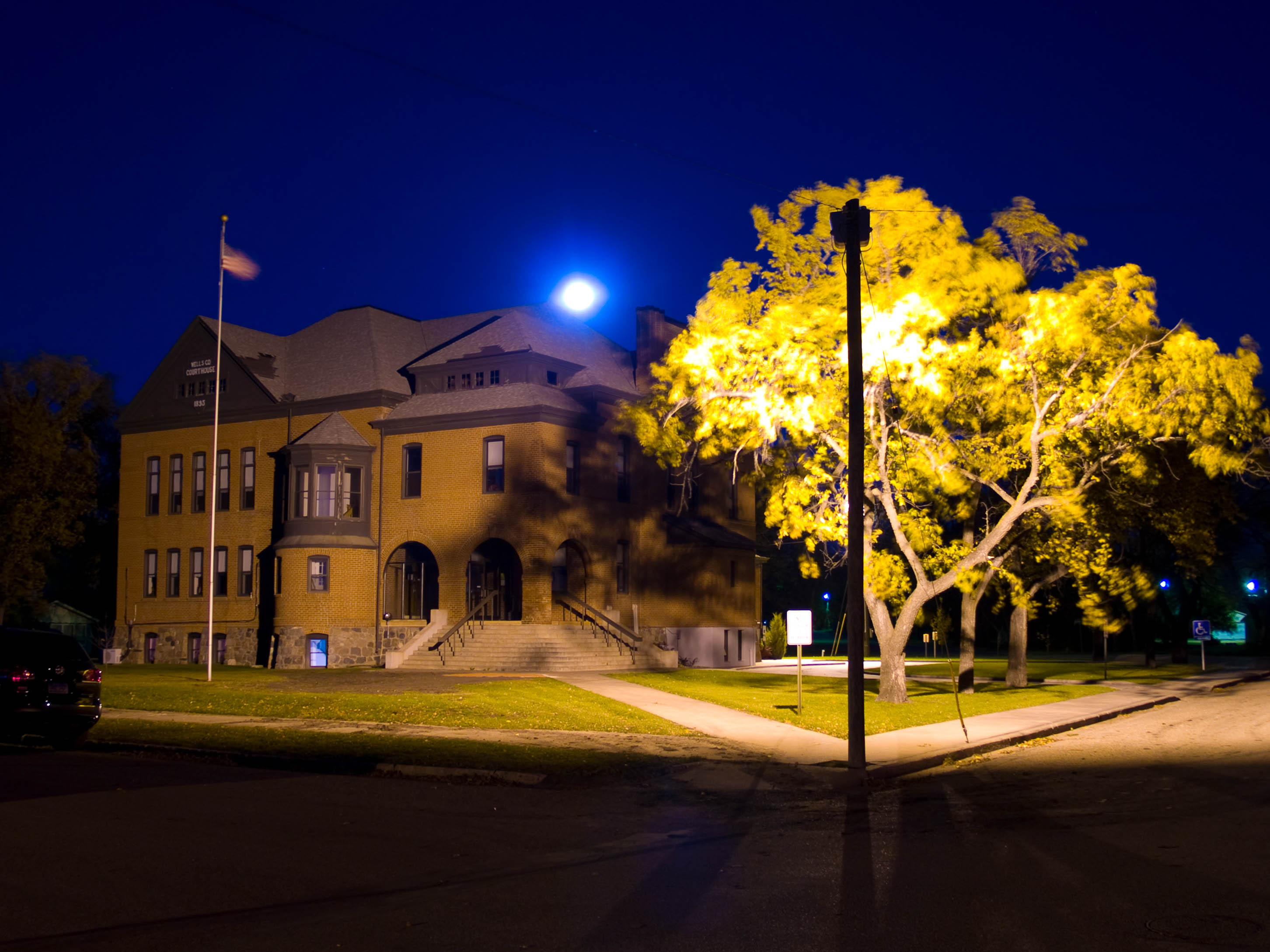

- Location within North Dakota Location within the United States
- Interactive map showing the location of Wells County Courthouse
- Location: Railway St., N., Fessenden, North Dakota
- Coordinates: 47°38′56″N 99°37′29″W
- Built: 1895
- Architect: Ross, John W.
- Architectural style: Queen Anne
- MPS: North Dakota County Courthouses TR (AD)
- NRHP reference No.: 77001037
- Added to NRHP: September 15, 1977

Wells County Courthouse in Fessenden, North Dakota, United States, is a two-story Queen Anne style courthouse built in 1895. It was listed on the National Register of Historic Places in 1977.

It was designed by John W. Ross (1848-1914). According to its NRHP nomination, the building "is stylistically significant for its Queen Anne design, and particularly so as an uncommon example in the state of the "urban" expression of that mode: brick fabric, with soaring, parapeted chimneys."

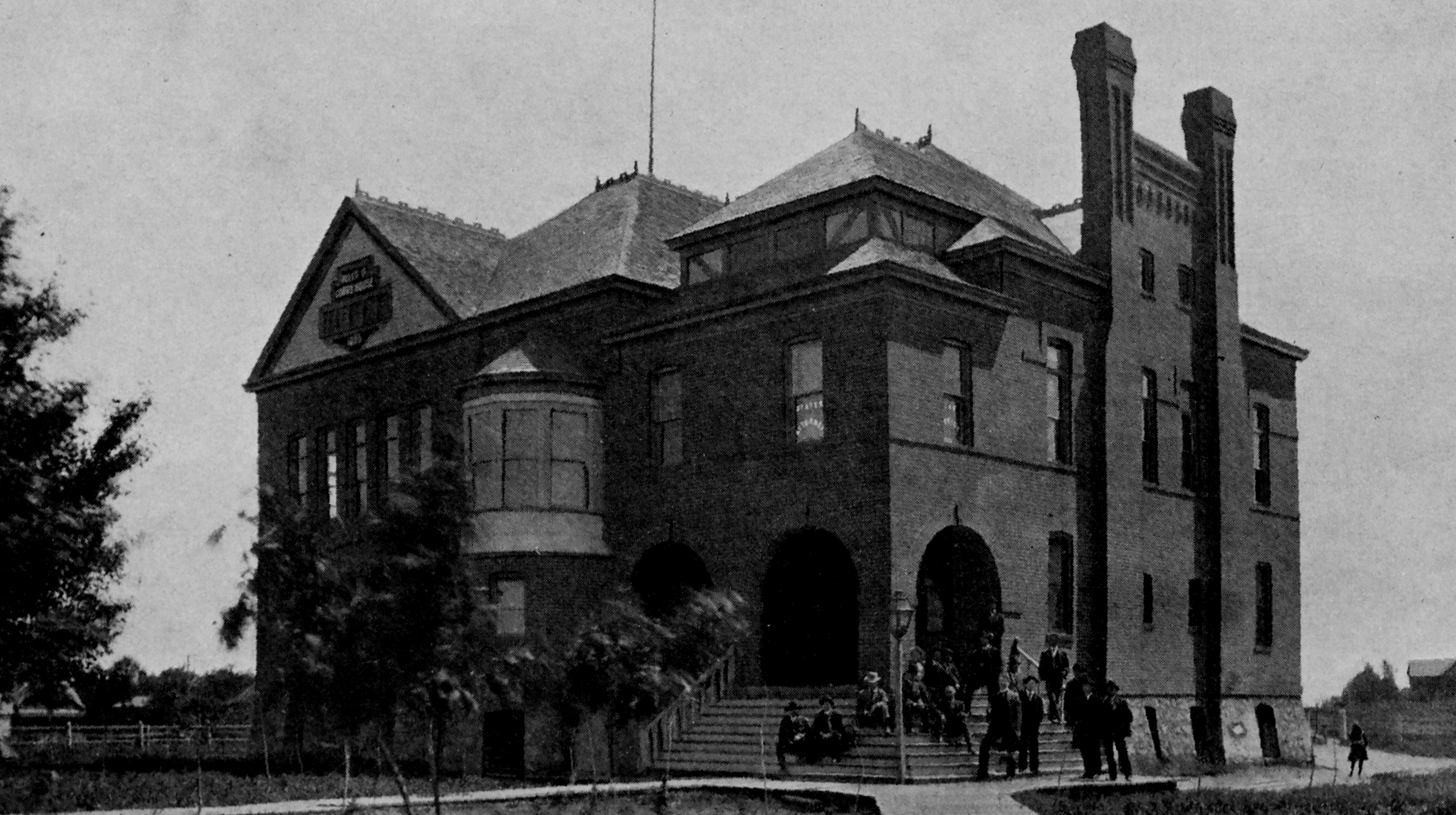
Wells County Courthouse, North Dakota, early 1900s
