= Fessenden, North Dakota =

- City
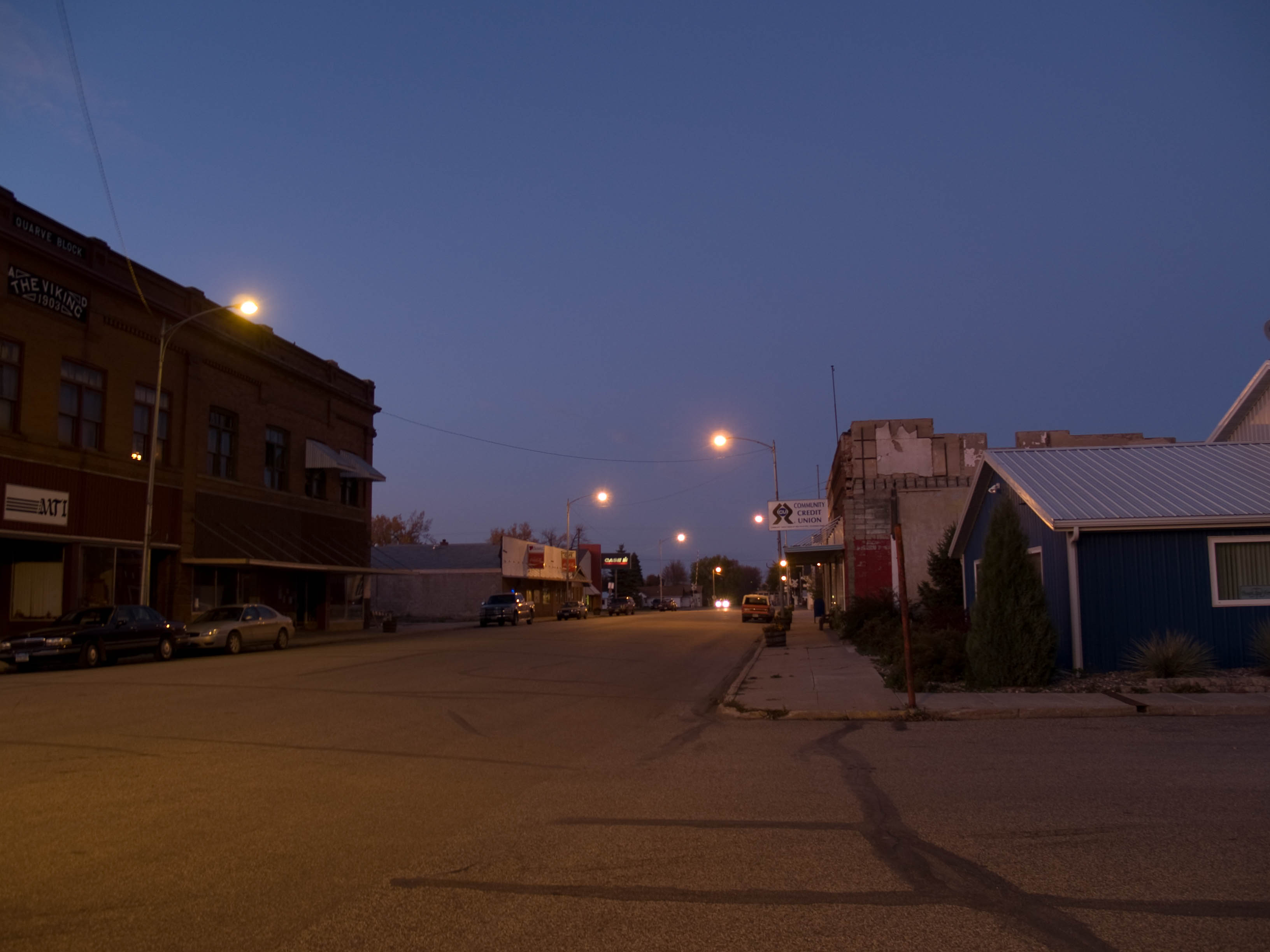
- Night view of Fessenden

- Logo
- Motto: "Proud Of Our Past Excited About Our Future..."
- Location of Fessenden, North Dakota
- Coordinates: 47°38′58″N 99°37′34″W
- Country: United States
- State: North Dakota
- County: Wells
- Founded: 1893

Government
  - Mayor: Kevin Roller

Area
  - Total: 0.44 sq mi (1.14 km^{2})
  - Land: 0.44 sq mi (1.14 km^{2})
  - Water: 0 sq mi (0.00 km^{2})
- Elevation: 1,611 ft (491 m)

Population (2020)
  - Total: 462
  - Estimate (2022): 458
  - Density: 1,047.1/sq mi (404.27/km^{2})
- Time zone: UTC−6 (Central (CST))
  - Summer (DST): UTC−5 (CDT)
- ZIP Code: 58438
- Area code: 701
- FIPS code: 38-26180
- GNIS feature ID: 1036031
- Website: www.fessendennd.org

Fessenden is a city in and the county seat of Wells County, North Dakota, United States. It was founded in 1893 and is home of the Wells County Fair. The population was 462 at the 2020 census.

== History ==
Fessenden was founded in 1893 with the arrival of the Minneapolis, St. Paul and Sault Ste. Marie Railroad into the area. In 1894, the county seat was transferred to Fessenden from Sykeston, North Dakota and the Wells County Courthouse was built the next year. It was named for ex-Surveyor General Fessenden, who had surveyed the county.

Fessenden Auditorium building on Main Ave. between Railway Street South and 1 Street South has collapsed on July 3, 2007. On April 16, 2009 there was a fire that destroyed a bar, bowling alley, and a cafe, as well as doing some damage to the medical center in Fessenden. Fessenden celebrated its centennial in July 1993.

== Geography ==
According to the United States Census Bureau, the city has a total area of 0.45 square miles (1.17 km^{2}), all land.

=== Climate ===
According to the Köppen Climate Classification system, Fessenden has a warm-summer humid continental climate, abbreviated "Dfb" on climate maps. The hottest temperature recorded in Fessenden was 116 °F (46.7 °C) on July 7, 1936, while the coldest temperature recorded was −47 °F (−43.9 °C) on February 15, 1936.

Climate data for Fessenden, North Dakota, 1991–2020 normals, extremes 1911–2012
Month	Jan	Feb	Mar	Apr	May	Jun	Jul	Aug	Sep	Oct	Nov	Dec	Year
Record high °F (°C)	56 (13)	63 (17)	80 (27)	97 (36)	108 (42)	107 (42)	116 (47)	106 (41)	106 (41)	96 (36)	76 (24)	67 (19)	116 (47)
Mean maximum °F (°C)	41.3 (5.2)	42.6 (5.9)	59.1 (15.1)	78.9 (26.1)	86.6 (30.3)	89.4 (31.9)	93.2 (34.0)	94.4 (34.7)	88.3 (31.3)	78.0 (25.6)	58.7 (14.8)	42.0 (5.6)	97.2 (36.2)
Mean daily maximum °F (°C)	18.8 (−7.3)	23.6 (−4.7)	35.7 (2.1)	53.5 (11.9)	66.8 (19.3)	75.2 (24.0)	80.4 (26.9)	80.5 (26.9)	71.6 (22.0)	55.4 (13.0)	36.2 (2.3)	23.1 (−4.9)	51.7 (11.0)
Daily mean °F (°C)	10.0 (−12.2)	14.4 (−9.8)	26.3 (−3.2)	41.4 (5.2)	54.3 (12.4)	63.8 (17.7)	68.5 (20.3)	67.3 (19.6)	58.7 (14.8)	44.1 (6.7)	27.4 (−2.6)	14.7 (−9.6)	40.9 (4.9)
Mean daily minimum °F (°C)	1.2 (−17.1)	5.3 (−14.8)	17.0 (−8.3)	29.3 (−1.5)	41.8 (5.4)	52.5 (11.4)	56.5 (13.6)	54.2 (12.3)	45.9 (7.7)	32.9 (0.5)	18.6 (−7.4)	6.3 (−14.3)	30.1 (−1.0)
Mean minimum °F (°C)	−24.5 (−31.4)	−19.2 (−28.4)	−6.6 (−21.4)	14.6 (−9.7)	26.9 (−2.8)	41.0 (5.0)	46.2 (7.9)	42.5 (5.8)	30.2 (−1.0)	14.1 (−9.9)	−3.4 (−19.7)	−18.7 (−28.2)	−28.4 (−33.6)
Record low °F (°C)	−44 (−42)	−47 (−44)	−33 (−36)	−8 (−22)	9 (−13)	28 (−2)	34 (1)	26 (−3)	15 (−9)	−10 (−23)	−26 (−32)	−42 (−41)	−47 (−44)
Average precipitation inches (mm)	0.37 (9.4)	0.44 (11)	0.46 (12)	0.90 (23)	2.74 (70)	3.22 (82)	2.91 (74)	2.04 (52)	2.08 (53)	1.08 (27)	0.56 (14)	0.47 (12)	17.27 (439.4)
Average snowfall inches (cm)	7.5 (19)	5.2 (13)	4.6 (12)	1.8 (4.6)	0.1 (0.25)	0.0 (0.0)	0.0 (0.0)	0.0 (0.0)	0.0 (0.0)	0.6 (1.5)	4.5 (11)	9.2 (23)	33.5 (84.35)
Average precipitation days (≥ 0.01 in)	3.5	3.5	2.5	3.8	7.3	7.7	6.0	5.4	4.0	3.3	2.1	3.3	52.4
Average snowy days (≥ 0.1 in)	3.4	2.9	2.1	0.6	0.1	0.0	0.0	0.0	0.0	0.1	1.4	3.5	14.1
Source 1: NOAA
Source 2: National Weather Service (mean maxima/minima 1981–2010)

== Demographics ==
Historical population
Census	Pop.	Note	%±
1910	713		—
1920	731		2.5%
1930	738		1.0%
1940	902		22.2%
1950	917		1.7%
1960	920		0.3%
1970	815		−11.4%
1980	761		−6.6%
1990	655		−13.9%
2000	625		−4.6%
2010	479		−23.4%
2020	462		−3.5%
2022 (est.)	458		−0.9%
U.S. Decennial Census; 2020 Census

=== 2010 census ===
As of the census of 2010, there were 479 people, 236 households, and 138 families residing in the city. The population density was 1,064.4 inhabitants per square mile (411.0/km^{2}). There were 289 housing units at an average density of 642.2 per square mile (248.0/km^{2}). The racial makeup of the city was 98.7% White, 0.2% African American, 0.2% Native American, and 0.8% from two or more races.

There were 236 households, of which 17.4% had children under the age of 18 living with them, 48.3% were married couples living together, 6.8% had a female householder with no husband present, 3.4% had a male householder with no wife present, and 41.5% were non-families. 37.3% of all households were made up of individuals, and 20.3% had someone living alone who was 65 years of age or older. The average household size was 2.03 and the average family size was 2.62.

The median age in the city was 52.7 years. 17.3% of residents were under the age of 18; 4.4% were between the ages of 18 and 24; 15.7% were from 25 to 44; 32.3% were from 45 to 64; and 30.3% were 65 years of age or older. The gender makeup of the city was 50.1% male and 49.9% female.

=== 2000 census ===
As of the census of 2000, there were 625 people, 279 households, and 171 families residing in the city. The population density was 1,378.4 inhabitants per square mile (532.2/km^{2}). There were 306 housing units at an average density of 674.9 per square mile (260.6/km^{2}). The racial makeup of the city was 99.20% White, 0.32% Native American, and 0.48% from two or more races. Hispanic or Latino of any race were 0.16% of the population.

There were 279 households, out of which 24.7% had children under the age of 18 living with them, 52.3% were married couples living together, 6.8% had a female householder with no husband present, and 38.7% were non-families. 36.9% of all households were made up of individuals, and 20.4% had someone living alone who was 65 years of age or older. The average household size was 2.22 and the average family size was 2.91.

In the city, the population was spread out, with 25.8% under the age of 18, 3.7% from 18 to 24, 22.7% from 25 to 44, 22.9% from 45 to 64, and 25.0% who were 65 years of age or older. The median age was 44 years. For every 100 females, there were 92.9 males. For every 100 females age 18 and over, there were 89.4 males.

The median income for a household in the city was $31,750, and the median income for a family was $38,304. Males had a median income of $26,111 versus $16,250 for females. The per capita income for the city was $17,303. About 8.2% of families and 10.3% of the population were below the poverty line, including 10.9% of those under age 18 and 17.4% of those age 65 or over.

== Climate ==
This climatic region is typified by large seasonal temperature differences, with warm to hot (and often humid) summers and cold (sometimes severely cold) winters. According to the Köppen Climate Classification system, Fessenden has a humid continental climate, abbreviated "Dfb" on climate maps.

== Notable people ==
- C. A. Bottolfsen, 17th and 19th Governor of Idaho
- Otto Krueger, North Dakota State Treasurer, North Dakota Insurance Commissioner, and U.S. Representative from North Dakota

== See also ==
- Beiseker Mansion
