= National Register of Historic Places listings in Grand Forks County, North Dakota =

Location of Grand Forks County in North Dakota

This is a list of the National Register of Historic Places listings in Grand Forks County, North Dakota. This is intended to be a complete list of the properties and districts on the National Register of Historic Places in Grand Forks County, North Dakota, United States. The locations of National Register properties and districts for which the latitude and longitude coordinates are included below, may be seen in an online map.

With 68 properties and districts listed on the National Register, Grand Forks County has more listings than any of the state's other 52 counties.

The city of Grand Forks has been damaged by floods and fires numerous times, including by floods of the Red River, overflowing its banks in record floods in 1882, 1893, 1897, 1950, 1965, 1966, 1969, 1975, 1978, and 1979." Many of the historic buildings listed on the National Register date from the 1890s period. Many buildings of that era were designed by architects Joseph Bell DeRemer and others; over 60 percent of the commercial buildings were built by the Dinnie Brothers, bricklayers. Other notable architects whose work is reflected in the listings include: Buechner & Orth, Theodore B. Wells, George Hancock and John W. Ross.

A large number of buildings were identified as worth preserving in a 1981 study of Downtown Grand Forks historical resources. This led to many individual buildings being NRHP-listed, and to the listing of several large historic districts. The 1997 flood and fire destroyed some of the National Register-listed buildings.

In 2005, despite the flood and fire damage to the area, the Downtown Grand Forks Historic District was listed. The most recent listings, in 2010, are the University of North Dakota Historic District and WPA Stone Structures in Memorial Park and Calvary Cemetery, and in 2011, The Kegs Drive-In.

A large number of the listings were prepared by Dr. Norene Roberts, of North Dakota State University. Additional notes for many are archived at the university.

Contents: Counties in North Dakota
Adams | Barnes | Benson | Billings | Bottineau | Bowman | Burke | Burleigh | Cass | Cavalier | Dickey | Divide | Dunn | Eddy | Emmons | Foster | Golden Valley | Grand Forks | Grant | Griggs | Hettinger | Kidder | LaMoure | Logan | McHenry | McIntosh | McKenzie | McLean | Mercer | Morton | Mountrail | Nelson | Oliver | Pembina | Pierce | Ramsey | Ransom | Renville | Richland | Rolette | Sargent | Sheridan | Sioux | Slope | Stark | Steele | Stutsman | Towner | Traill | Walsh | Ward | Wells | Williams

This National Park Service list is complete through NPS recent listings posted November 6, 2026.

== Current listings ==
	Name on the Register	Image	Date listed	Location	City or town	Description
1	Administration Building for the City of Grand Forks at the Grand Forks Airport	Administration Building for the City of Grand Forks at the Grand Forks Airport	December 3, 2020 (#100005844)	802 North 43rd St. 47°55′40″N 97°05′28″W	Grand Forks	
2	Avalon Theater	Avalon Theater	February 4, 1991 (#90002191)	210 Towner Ave. 47°54′19″N 97°37′25″W	Larimore	Art Deco style movie theater built in 1938 as a 350 seat theater
3	Baukol Historic District	Baukol Historic District	October 11, 2023 (#100009437)	Bounded by 405 Alpha Ave., 1801-1927 North 4th St., 1803-1815 North 3rd St., and 301-407 Park Ave. 47°56′18″N 97°02′45″W	Grand Forks	
4	Harriet and Thomas Beare House	Harriet and Thomas Beare House	April 20, 1995 (#95000469)	420 Reeves Dr. 47°55′04″N 97°01′36″W	Grand Forks	Victorian house built in 1901 for real estate man Thomas Beare, exemplifying the conspicuous consumption of the cities' elite during the Progressive Era and the growth of the Second Dakota Boom.
5	R.S. Blome Granitoid Pavement in Grand Forks	R.S. Blome Granitoid Pavement in Grand Forks	November 5, 1991 (#91001583)	Roughly Lewis Boulevard south of Conklin Ave. and the area around the junctions of Walnut St. and 3rd Ave. and Minnesota Ave. and 5th St. 47°55′27″N 97°01′58″W	Grand Forks	Paved area of a historic road surface, a Portland cement–aggregate combination that was intended to bridge the gap between the needs of Horse-drawn vehicles, which required sure footing, and automobiles, which needed a hard, resilient surface, in the early 1900s. Boundary decreased on August 30, 2010.
6	B'nai Israel Synagogue and Montefiore Cemetery	B'nai Israel Synagogue and Montefiore Cemetery	October 13, 2011 (#11000745)	601 Cottonwood St. and 1450 N. Columbia Rd. 47°56′02″N 97°04′00″W	Grand Forks	
7	Building at 201 S. 3rd St.	Building at 201 S. 3rd St.	October 26, 1982 (#82001315)	201 S. 3rd St. 47°55′23″N 97°01′37″W	Grand Forks	Built in 1888, "one of three frame storefront buildings in Grand Forks dating from the early period of frame construction along South Third Street, which was the original main thoroughfare in the city between 1870 and the coming of the railroad and the great Dakota Boom in the 1880s. It represents the first period of early boom town building in the city." Relocated to 216 S. 3rd St. after the 1997 Red River flood
8	Building at 312 Kittson Ave.	Building at 312 Kittson Ave.	October 26, 1982 (#82001317)	312 Kittson Ave. 47°55′27″N 97°01′45″W	Grand Forks	
9	Thomas D. Campbell House	Thomas D. Campbell House	September 29, 1987 (#87002010)	2405 Belmont Rd. 47°53′47″N 97°01′38″W	Grand Forks	Gothic Revival style log and wood frame home built in 1879, now a house museum.
10	George B. Clifford House	George B. Clifford House	September 30, 1986 (#86002655)	406 Reeves Dr. 47°55′06″N 97°01′36″W	Grand Forks	
11	Dakota Block	Dakota Block	October 26, 1982 (#82001320)	21 S. 4th St. 47°55′26″N 97°01′48″W	Grand Forks	
12	Joseph Bell DeRemer House	Joseph Bell DeRemer House	June 9, 1983 (#83001933)	625 Belmont Rd. 47°54′57″N 97°01′42″W	Grand Forks	
13	Dinnie Apartments	Dinnie Apartments	June 3, 1994 (#94000555)	102-108 4th Ave., S. 47°55′07″N 97°01′33″W	Grand Forks	Part of Downtown Grand Forks MRA.
14	Downtown Grand Forks Historic District	Downtown Grand Forks Historic District	December 28, 2005 (#05001475)	Downtown Grand Forks, at the Red River of the North; 47°55′35″N 97°01′51″W	Grand Forks	
15	Edgar Building	Edgar Building	April 15, 1983 (#83001934)	314 Kittson Ave. 47°55′27″N 97°01′46″W	Grand Forks	
16	Finks and Gokey Block	Finks and Gokey Block	April 20, 1983 (#83001935)	414-420 DeMers Ave. 47°55′27″N 97°01′55″W	Grand Forks	
17	First National Bank	First National Bank	October 26, 1982 (#82001323)	322 DeMers Ave. 47°55′29″N 97°01′52″W	Grand Forks	Damaged by fire during the 1997 Red River flood. Only burned structure to survive.
18	Ben Franklin Elementary School	Ben Franklin Elementary School	July 17, 2020 (#100005260)	1016 South 20th St. 47°54′43″N 97°03′20″W	Grand Forks	
19	Chester Fritz Auditorium	Chester Fritz Auditorium	October 20, 2023 (#100009452)	3475 University Ave. (University of North Dakota); 47°55′18″N 97°04′44″W	Grand Forks	
20	Carlott Funseth Round Barn		October 7, 1986 (#86002752)	ND 38; 47°46′46″N 97°35′56″W	Kempton	
21	Grand Forks City Hall	Grand Forks City Hall	October 26, 1982 (#82001325)	404 N. 2nd Ave. 47°55′33″N 97°02′03″W	Grand Forks	
22	Grand Forks County Courthouse	Grand Forks County Courthouse	November 25, 1980 (#80002913)	S. 5th St; 47°55′22″N 97°01′46″W	Grand Forks	
23	Grand Forks County Fairgrounds WPA Structures	Grand Forks County Fairgrounds WPA Structures	April 21, 2009 (#08001262)	2300 Gateway Dr. 47°55′59″N 97°03′34″W	Grand Forks	
24	Grand Forks Herald	Grand Forks Herald	November 30, 1982 (#82001326)	120-124 N. 4th St. 47°55′33″N 97°01′58″W	Grand Forks	Destroyed by the 1997 Red River flood and subsequent fire.
25	Grand Forks Mercantile Building 1898	Grand Forks Mercantile Building 1898	July 14, 2004 (#04000700)	112-118 N. 3rd St. 47°55′42″N 97°01′56″W	Grand Forks	
26	Grand Forks Mercantile Co.	Grand Forks Mercantile Co.	October 26, 1982 (#82001327)	124 N. 3rd St. 47°55′36″N 97°01′56″W	Grand Forks	
27	Grand Forks Near Southside Historic District	Grand Forks Near Southside Historic District	July 28, 2004 (#04000757)	Roughly bounded by ND 697, the Red River, 13th Ave., and Cottonwood St.; also 1216 Belmont Rd. 47°55′03″N 97°01′37″W	Grand Forks	Belmont Road address represents a boundary increase
28	Grand Forks Riverside Neighborhood Historic District	Grand Forks Riverside Neighborhood Historic District	November 15, 2007 (#07000181)	North of U.S. Route 2 (Gateway Dr. and west of the Red River); 47°56′14″N 97°02′32″W	Grand Forks	
29	Grand Forks Woolen Mills	Grand Forks Woolen Mills	October 26, 1983 (#83001936)	301 N. 3rd St. 47°55′38″N 97°02′02″W	Grand Forks	
30	Great Northern Freight Warehouse and Depot	Great Northern Freight Warehouse and Depot	January 29, 1990 (#89002031)	899 2nd Ave., N. 47°55′15″N 97°02′15″W	Grand Forks	
31	Hariman Sanatorium	Hariman Sanatorium	August 28, 2013 (#13000633)	2002 University Ave. 47°55′21″N 97°03′21″W	Grand Forks	
32	Hook and Ladder No. 1 and Hose Co. No. 2	Hook and Ladder No. 1 and Hose Co. No. 2	October 26, 1982 (#82001328)	215 S. 4th St. 47°55′21″N 97°01′38″W	Grand Forks	
33	Iddings Block	Iddings Block	October 26, 1982 (#82001329)	9 N. 3rd St. 47°55′32″N 97°01′52″W	Grand Forks	
34	The Kegs Drive-In	The Kegs Drive-In	August 24, 2011 (#11000603)	901 N. 5th St. 47°55′48″N 97°02′39″W	Grand Forks	
35	J. Nelson Kelly House	J. Nelson Kelly House	February 18, 1994 (#94000058)	521 S. 5th St. 47°55′10″N 97°01′28″W	Grand Forks	
36	Larimore City Hall	Larimore City Hall	May 31, 1990 (#90000600)	Block 64, bounded by Towner, 3rd, Terry, and Main; 47°54′23″N 97°37′58″W	Larimore	
37	Lewis and Clark Elementary School	Lewis and Clark Elementary School	July 17, 2020 (#100005261)	1100 13th Ave. South; 47°54′32″N 97°02′34″W	Grand Forks	
38	Martin V. Linwell House		February 28, 1980 (#80002914)	316 S. Raymond St. 47°43′56″N 97°34′05″W	Northwood	
39	Masonic Temple	Masonic Temple	October 26, 1982 (#82001331)	413-421 Bruce Ave. 47°55′18″N 97°01′43″W	Grand Forks	
40	Metropolitan Opera House	Metropolitan Opera House	August 27, 1999 (#99001048)	116 S. 3rd St. 47°55′26″N 97°01′41″W	Grand Forks	
41	Midway Bridge	Midway Bridge	February 27, 1997 (#97000176)	Unnamed county road across an unnamed creek, approximately 1.5 miles south and 2 miles west of Johnstown; 48°07′50″N 97°30′50″W	Johnstown	
42	North Dakota Mill and Elevator	North Dakota Mill and Elevator	May 11, 1992 (#92000433)	1823 Mill Rd. 47°56′21″N 97°03′21″W	Grand Forks	
43	Northern Pacific Depot and Freight House	Northern Pacific Depot and Freight House	October 26, 1982 (#82001333)	202 N. 3rd St. 47°55′37″N 97°01′58″W	Grand Forks	
44	Odd Fellows Block	Odd Fellows Block	October 26, 1982 (#82001334)	23-25 S. 4th St. 47°55′26″N 97°01′47″W	Grand Forks	
45	Ost Valle Bridge	Ost Valle Bridge	February 27, 1997 (#97000178)	Unnamed county road across an unnamed tributary of the Red River, approximately 6 miles east and 1 mile north of Thompson; 47°47′18″N 96°58′57″W	Thompson	
46	Oxford House	Oxford House	May 2, 1973 (#73001384)	University of North Dakota campus 47°55′19″N 97°04′26″W	Grand Forks	
47	Roller Office Supply	Roller Office Supply	October 26, 1982 (#82001336)	7 N. 3rd St. 47°55′31″N 97°01′51″W	Grand Forks	
48	St. John's Block Commercial Exchange	St. John's Block Commercial Exchange	October 26, 1982 (#82001338)	2 N. 3rd St. 47°55′32″N 97°01′49″W	Grand Forks	
49	St. Michael's Church	St. Michael's Church	June 30, 1988 (#88000983)	520 N. 6th St. 47°55′37″N 97°02′21″W	Grand Forks	
50	St. Michael's Hospital and Nurses' Residence	St. Michael's Hospital and Nurses' Residence	April 20, 1995 (#95000468)	813 Lewis Boulevard; 47°55′57″N 97°02′22″W	Grand Forks	
51	St. Michael's Parochial School	St. Michael's Parochial School	July 18, 2016 (#16000457)	504 N. 5th Ave. 47°55′39″N 97°02′23″W	Grand Forks	
52	Skarsbo Apartments	Skarsbo Apartments	August 27, 2013 (#13000634)	204 & 210 N. 6th St. 47°55′29″N 97°02′10″W	Grand Forks	
53	Sorlie Memorial Bridge	Sorlie Memorial Bridge	July 19, 1999 (#99000844)	Eastern end of Demers Ave. 47°55′37″N 97°01′40″W	Grand Forks	
54	South Junior High School	South Junior High School	March 5, 1999 (#99000274)	1224 Walnut St. 47°54′33″N 97°01′55″W	Grand Forks	
55	Speed Printing	Speed Printing	October 26, 1982 (#82001337)	220 S. 3rd St. 47°55′23″N 97°01′35″W	Grand Forks	
56	Stratford Building	Stratford Building	October 26, 1982 (#82001339)	311 DeMers Ave. 47°55′29″N 97°01′50″W	Grand Forks	
57	Telephone Co. Building	Telephone Co. Building	October 26, 1982 (#82001340)	24 N. 4th St. 47°55′31″N 97°01′55″W	Grand Forks	
58	U.S. Post Office and Courthouse	U.S. Post Office and Courthouse	June 3, 1976 (#76001354)	102 N. 4th St. 47°55′32″N 97°01′57″W	Grand Forks	
59	United Lutheran Church	United Lutheran Church	December 30, 1991 (#91001906)	324 Chestnut St. 47°55′07″N 97°01′49″W	Grand Forks	
60	University of North Dakota Historic District	University of North Dakota Historic District	January 13, 2010 (#08001233)	University of North Dakota; 47°55′21″N 97°04′14″W	Grand Forks	
61	Valley Junior High School	Valley Junior High School	July 17, 2020 (#100005262)	2100 5th Ave. North; 47°55′27″N 97°03′23″W	Grand Forks	
62	Viking Elementary School	Viking Elementary School	July 17, 2020 (#100005263)	809 22nd Ave. South; 47°53′55″N 97°02′17″W	Grand Forks	
63	Washington School	Washington School	February 24, 1992 (#92000035)	422 N. 6th St. 47°55′34″N 97°02′18″W	Grand Forks	
64	Wells-Denbrook Architects Office Building	Wells-Denbrook Architects Office Building	November 4, 2014 (#14000900)	1701 Cherry St. 47°54′13″N 97°02′08″W	Grand Forks	
65	Dr. Henry Wheeler House	Dr. Henry Wheeler House	January 16, 1986 (#86000166)	420 Franklin St. 47°55′13″N 97°01′33″W	Grand Forks	
66	Wilder Elementary School	Wilder Elementary School	July 17, 2020 (#100005265)	1009 North 3rd St. 47°55′58″N 97°02′38″W	Grand Forks	
67	WPA Stone Structures in Memorial Park and Calvary Cemetery	WPA Stone Structures in Memorial Park and Calvary Cemetery	July 6, 2010 (#10000424)	Southeast corner from intersection of Gateway Dr. and N Columbia Rd. 47°55′59″N 97°04′00″W	Grand Forks	
68	Wright Block	Wright Block	October 26, 1982 (#82001342)	408-412 DeMers Ave. 47°55′28″N 97°01′54″W	Grand Forks	

== Former listings ==
	Name on the Register	Image	Date listed	Date removed	Location	City or town	Description
1	BPOE Lodge: Golden Block		October 26, 1982 (#82001314)	September 23, 2004	12 N. 4th St.	Grand Forks	Early Commercial/vernacular style building that was designed and/or built by Josep Bell DeRemer. Destroyed by the 1997 Red River flood.
2	Building at 205 DeMers Ave.		October 26, 1982 (#82001316)	July 13, 2018	205 DeMers Ave. 47°55′32″N 97°01′46″W	Grand Forks	Destroyed by the 1997 Red River flood
3	Building at 317 S. 3rd St.		October 26, 1982 (#82001318)	June 27, 2018	317 S. 3rd St. 47°55′21″N 97°01′30″W	Grand Forks	Destroyed by the 1997 Red River flood
4	Clifford Annex		October 26, 1982 (#82001319)	September 23, 2004	407-411 DeMers Ave.	Grand Forks	Destroyed by the 1997 Red River flood and subsequent fire.
5	Dinnie Block		October 26, 1982 (#82001321)	September 23, 2004	109 N. 3rd Ave.	Grand Forks	Destroyed by the 1997 Red River flood.
6	Electric Construction Co. Building		October 26, 1982 (#82001322)	September 23, 2004	16 S. 4th St.	Grand Forks	Destroyed by the 1997 Red River flood.
7	Flatiron Building		October 26, 1982 (#82001324)	September 23, 2004	323 Kittson Ave.	Grand Forks	Destroyed by the 1997 Red River flood.
8	House at 1648 Riverside Drive		September 2, 1994 (#94001074)	October 12, 2023	1648 Riverside Dr. 47°56′09″N 97°02′11″W	Grand Forks	Destroyed by the 1997 Red River flood.
9	Lyons Garage	Lyons Garage	October 26, 1982 (#82001330)	October 12, 2023	214-218 N. 4th St. 47°55′35″N 97°02′03″W	Grand Forks	Demolished 2022
10	New Hampshire Apartments	New Hampshire Apartments	October 26, 1982 (#82001332)	June 27, 2018	105 N. 3rd St. 47°55′34″N 97°01′55″W	Grand Forks	Classically-detailed, Early Commercial building designed by Joseph DeRemer, constructed by Dinnie Brothers in 1904; destroyed by the 1997 Red River flood, A historical marker indicates that the building was destroyed in the 1997 Red River flood and fire.
11	Northwood Bridge		February 27, 1997 (#97000175)	June 10, 2021	Unnamed county road across the Goose River, 1.5 miles southwest of Northwood; 47°43′03″N 97°36′25″W	Northwood	Destroyed by overweight load 7/22/2019.
12	Red River Valley Brick Co.		October 26, 1982 (#82001335)	September 23, 2004	215 S. 3rd St.	Grand Forks	Destroyed by the 1997 Red River flood.
13	Viets Hotel		October 26, 1982 (#82001341)	June 27, 2018	309-311 3rd St., S. 47°55′22″N 97°01′30″W	Grand Forks	Damaged by the 1997 Red River flood and destroyed by fire in September 2000
14	West Elementary School		July 17, 2020 (#100005264)	January 15, 2026	615 North 25th St. 47°55′32″N 97°03′46″W	Grand Forks	Demolished December 2021.

== See also ==
- List of National Historic Landmarks in North Dakota
- National Register of Historic Places listings in North Dakota
