= Grand Forks station (disambiguation) =

Grand Forks station is an active train station in Grand Forks, North Dakota. Other uses:

- Grand Forks station (Northern Pacific Railway), a historic train station in Grand Forks, North Dakota
- Grand Forks freight station, a historic freight house in Grand Forks, North Dakota
