= Lyons Garage =

Lyons Garage may refer to:

- Lyons Garage (Grand Forks, North Dakota), listed on the National Register of Historic Places
- Lyons Garage, Torrington, Connecticut, a contributing building in the Downtown Torrington Historic District, which is listed on the National Register of Historic Places
