= Dakota Block =

Dakota Block may refer to:

- Dakota Block (Grand Forks, North Dakota), a historic commercial building
- Dakota Block, a character in the 2007 film Grindhouse
- Dakota Block, a character in the 2014 TV series From Dusk till Dawn: The Series
