= Graber House =

Graber House may refer to:

- John P.O. Graber House, Hutchinson, Kansas, listed on the National Register of Historic Places (NRHP) in Reno County, Kansas
- House at 1648 Riverside Drive, Grand Forks, North Dakota, NRHP-listed and also known as Graber Residence

== See also ==
- Graber Olive House, olive-packer in Ontario, California
