= Grand Forks Riverside Neighborhood Historic District =

Historic district in North Dakota, United States

- U.S. National Register of Historic Places
- U.S. Historic district
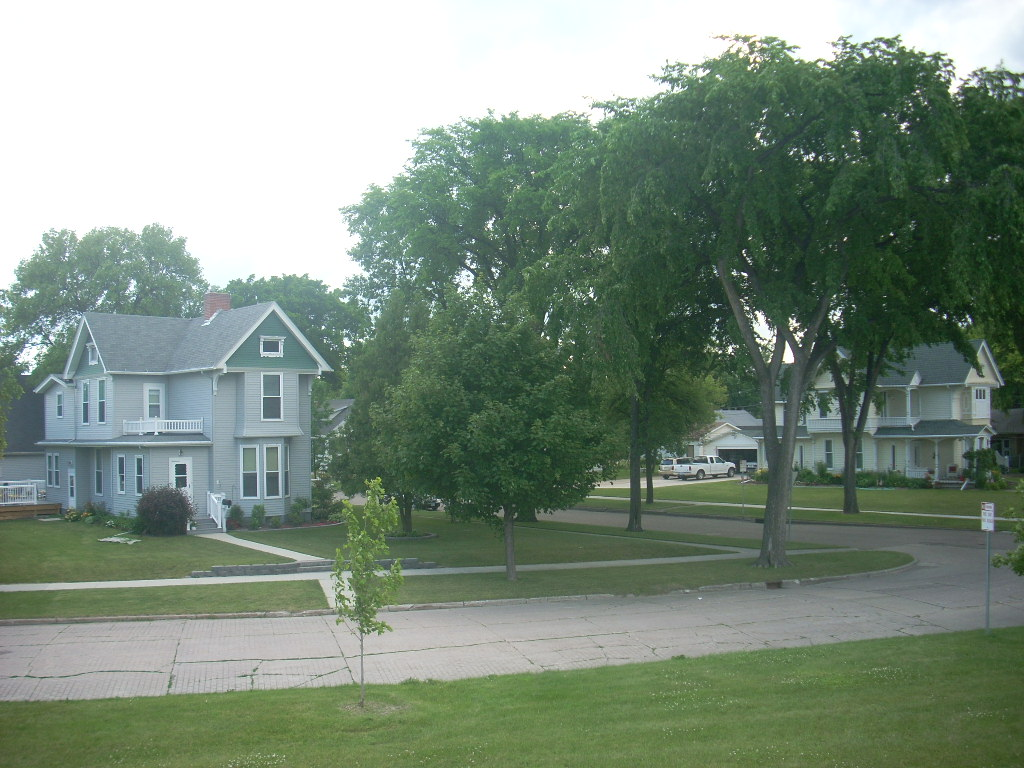
- Homes on Granitoid-paved Lewis Boulevard within the historic district.

- Location within North Dakota Location within the United States
- Location: N of US 2 Gateway Dr. and W of the Red River, Grand Forks, North Dakota
- Coordinates: 47°56′14″N 97°2′32″W
- Area: 112 acres (45 ha)
- Built: 1883, 1905 and 1909
- Architect: Henry L. Sage, et al.
- Architectural style: Late 19th and 20th Century Revivals and Late 19th and Early 20th Century American Movements
- NRHP reference No.: 07000181
- Added to NRHP: November 15, 2007

The Grand Forks Riverside Neighborhood Historic District is a 112-acre (45 ha) historic district in Grand Forks, North Dakota that was listed on the National Register of Historic Places in 2007.

According to The Herald, citing Peg O'Leary, coordinator of the Grand Forks Historic Preservation Commission:

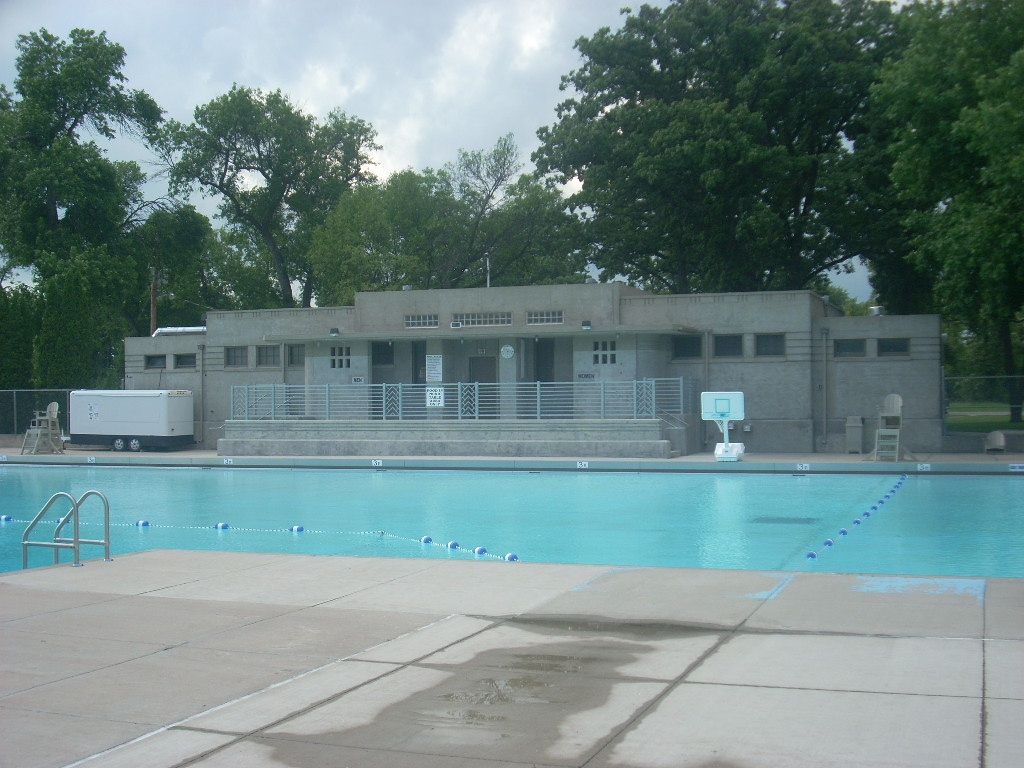
Riverside Pool, a contributing element of the historic district.

The Riverside area is significant for its "mechanics' cottages," working-class homes with simple yet distinctive designs built in the '20s and '30s, O'Leary said, and for some homes of early residents dating back as far as the 1880s.

About 70 percent of private homes in the Riverside area - which stretches from near Seward Avenue north through Riverside Park and from North Third Street east to the Red River - are listed as "contributing elements" in the historic registry, as are the Riverside Pool and the park itself, O'Leary said.

Many homes in that area were lost during the 1997 flood, O'Leary said, but the remaining homes were sufficient to win the neighborhood the coveted federal status. The designation also comes with some requirements if the city uses federal money in the neighborhood, she said."

It is the third historic district designated in Grand Forks (the others are the Downtown Grand Forks Historic District and the Grand Forks Near Southside Historic District).The district includes Late 19th and 20th Century Revivals and Late 19th and Early 20th Century American Movements architecture.

When listed, the district included 116 contributing buildings, two contributing structures, and one contributing site. Also included are 54 non-contributing buildings.
