= St. Michael's Parochial School =

- U.S. National Register of Historic Places
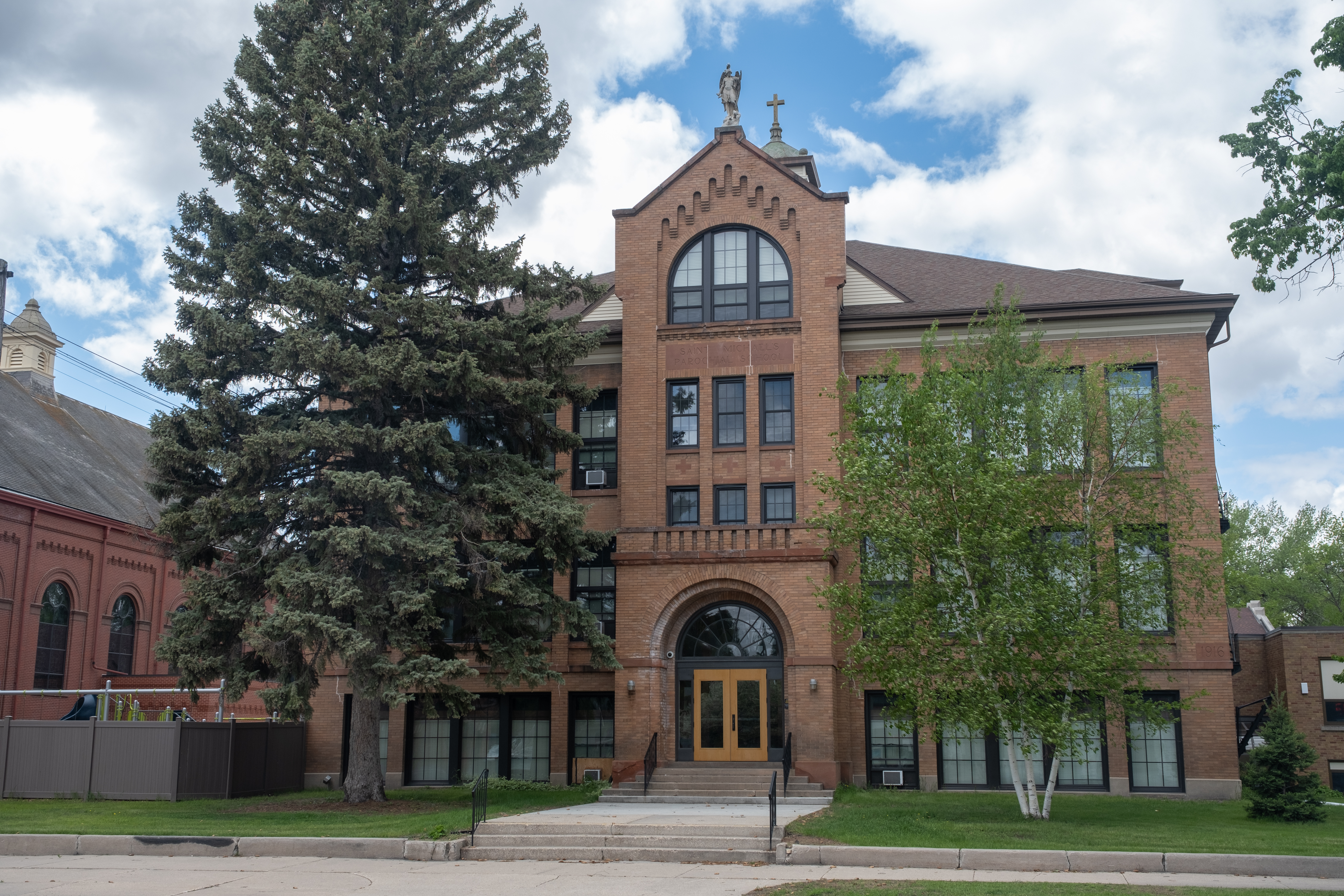

- Location within North Dakota Location within the United States
- Location: 504 N. 5th Ave., Grand Forks, North Dakota
- Coordinates: 47°55′39″N 97°02′23″W
- Built: 1916, 1949, 1953
- Built by: Dinnie Brothers
- Architect: William J. Edwards, Ursa L. Freed
- NRHP reference No.: 16000457
- Added to NRHP: July 18, 2016

The St. Michael's Parochial School at 504 N. 5th Ave. in Grand Forks, North Dakota, USA, also known as St. Michael's School, is a school complex which was listed on the National Register of Historic Places in 2016.

Its original building was designed by Grand Forks architect William J. Edwards and was built in 1916 by the Dinnie Brothers contractors. Two additions to the complex in 1949 and 1953 were designed by South Dakota architect Ursa L. Freed.

William J. Edwards also designed the Washington School in Grand Forks, which is also NRHP-listed.
