= Odd Fellows Block (Grand Forks, North Dakota) =

- U.S. National Register of Historic Places
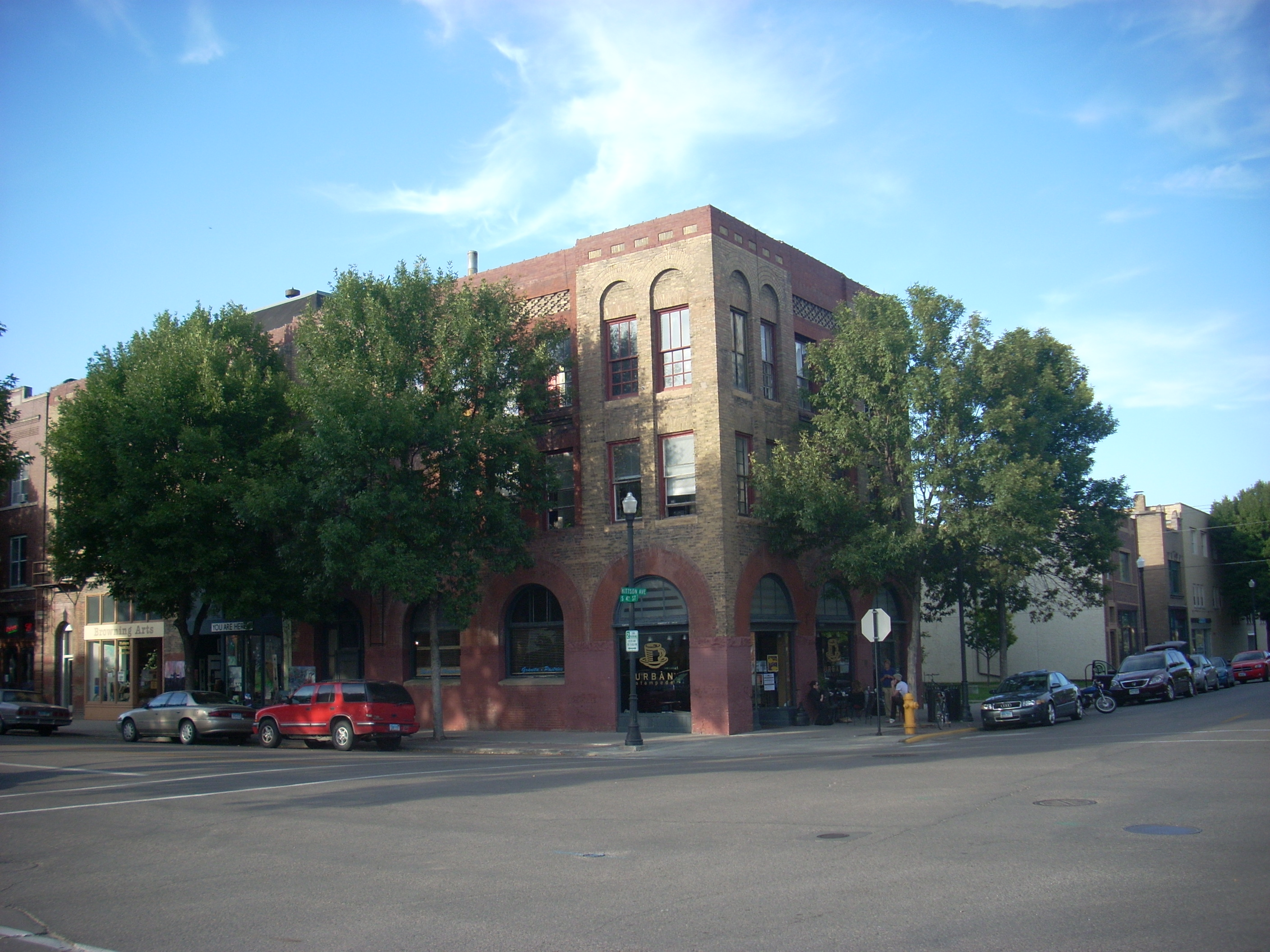
- Odd Fellows Block, 2009

- Location within North Dakota Location within the United States
- Location: 23-25 S. 4th St., Grand Forks, North Dakota
- Coordinates: 47°55′26″N 97°1′47″W
- Area: less than one acre
- Built: 1888
- Architectural style: Romanesque
- MPS: Downtown Grand Forks MRA
- NRHP reference No.: 82001334
- Added to NRHP: October 26, 1982

The Odd Fellows Block, located at 23-25 S 4th st and 324 Kittson Ave in the Downtown Grand Forks Historic District of Grand Forks, North Dakota is a historic building built in 1888 as a home for the Odd Fellows meeting hall, which was situated on the third floor. The hall was fitted with a large and well-appointed lodge room, a banquet hall, and numerous smaller rooms.

== History ==
The Odd Fellows Block is architecturally significant in that it is one of two remaining Richardsonian Romanesque buildings extant in Grand Forks along with the St John's Block. These buildings were, along with the now demolished Security Building, the most impressive in Grand Forks in the late 19th century. The south (principal) and west elevations of the building feature cream brick towers framing recessed red brick bays along with stone details and decorative brick panels. Visible above the roof is a large wire frame skylight, now covered over with tar paper, which once lit the meeting hall below. The second floor apartments date to the original construction.

The Odd Fellows Block played a significant role in the social and civic life of Grand Forks in the last decades of the 19th century serving as a meeting place for three Odd Fellows' lodges and the Daughters of Rebekah, as well as for lodges of the Ancient Order of United Workmen, the Knights of the Maccabees, the Order of Foresters, the Grand Army of the Republic, and the Royal Arcanum.

The Odd Fellows block serves as the southwestern anchor of the historic district in downtown Grand Forks.
