= Flatiron Building (Grand Forks, North Dakota) =

- Formerly listed on the U.S. National Register of Historic Places
- Location within North Dakota Location within the United States
- Location: 323 Kittson Ave., Grand Forks, North Dakota
- Coordinates: 47°55′25.3″N 97°1′47.2″W
- Area: less than 1 acre (0.40 ha)
- Built: 1906
- Architectural style: Early Commercial; Vernacular-Gothic Details; and Other
- MPS: Downtown Grand Forks MRA
- NRHP reference No.: 82001324
- Removed from NRHP: September 23, 2004

The Flatiron Building was an historic building in Grand Forks, North Dakota, that was built in 1906 and was destroyed by the 1997 Red River flood. It was listed on the National Register of Historic Places but was removed from the Register in 2004 because it had been destroyed.

Built adjacent to the Great Northern railroad, the building was first used as office space for the Grand Forks Ice Company. The company had been established in 1877 by John Lynch to supply ice to local customers, but by the turn of the 20th century it had grown to become a supplier of ice and coal for a larger region. As such, it was dependent on access to rail transport.

By 1981, the Flatiron Building was still owned by the Lynch family. Its architecture is characterized as Early Commercial and "Vernacular-Gothic Details."

Two other wholesale buildings in Grand Forks that were listed on the National Register, within the N. Third Street wholesale district, are the Grand Forks Mercantile Co. building, built in 1893, and the Iddings Block, built in 1892.

== See also ==
- List of ice companies
