= Electric Construction Co. Building =

- Formerly listed on the U.S. National Register of Historic Places
- Location within North Dakota Location within the United States
- Location: 16 S. 4th St., Grand Forks, North Dakota
- Coordinates: 47°55′28.1″N 97°1′52.2″W
- Area: less than 1 acre (0.40 ha)
- Built: 1908
- Architectural style: Early Commercial, Vernacular, and Other
- MPS: Downtown Grand Forks MRA
- NRHP reference No.: 82001322
- Removed from NRHP: September 23, 2004

The Electric Construction Co. Building is or was a property in Grand Forks, North Dakota. It was removed from the National Register of Historic Places in 2004.

It was built or has other significance in 1908. The listing described Early Commercial, Vernacular, and other architecture. The listing was for an area of less than one acre with just one contributing building.

The property was covered in a 1981 study of Downtown Grand Forks historical resources.

Its listing status is "RN", which means removed from National Register.
