= BPOE Lodge: Golden Block =

- Formerly listed on the U.S. National Register of Historic Places
- Location within North Dakota Location within the United States
- Location: 12 N. 4th St., Grand Forks, North Dakota
- Coordinates: 47°55′31″N 97°01′57″W
- Area: less than 1 acre (0.40 ha)
- Built: c. 1910
- Architect: Joseph Bell DeRemer
- Architectural style: Early Commercial; Vernacular
- MPS: Downtown Grand Forks MRA
- NRHP reference No.: 82001314
- Removed from NRHP: September 23, 2004

The BPOE Lodge: Golden Block, also referred to as Golden Square, was a building in Grand Forks, North Dakota that was listed on the National Register of Historic Places, but was removed from the National Register in 2004.

Also known as Golden Block, the Benevolent and Protective Order of Elks clubhouse was built c. 1910. It was designed by Joseph Bell DeRemer. It included Early Commercial, Vernacular, and other architecture.

Along with Wright Block, the Telephone Co. Building, the Dinnie Block, and Clifford Annex, the Golden Block was one of many "commercial vernacular brick buildings with classical revival details" that were built during a major building boom, with high quality brickwork.
