= Wright Block =

- U.S. National Register of Historic Places
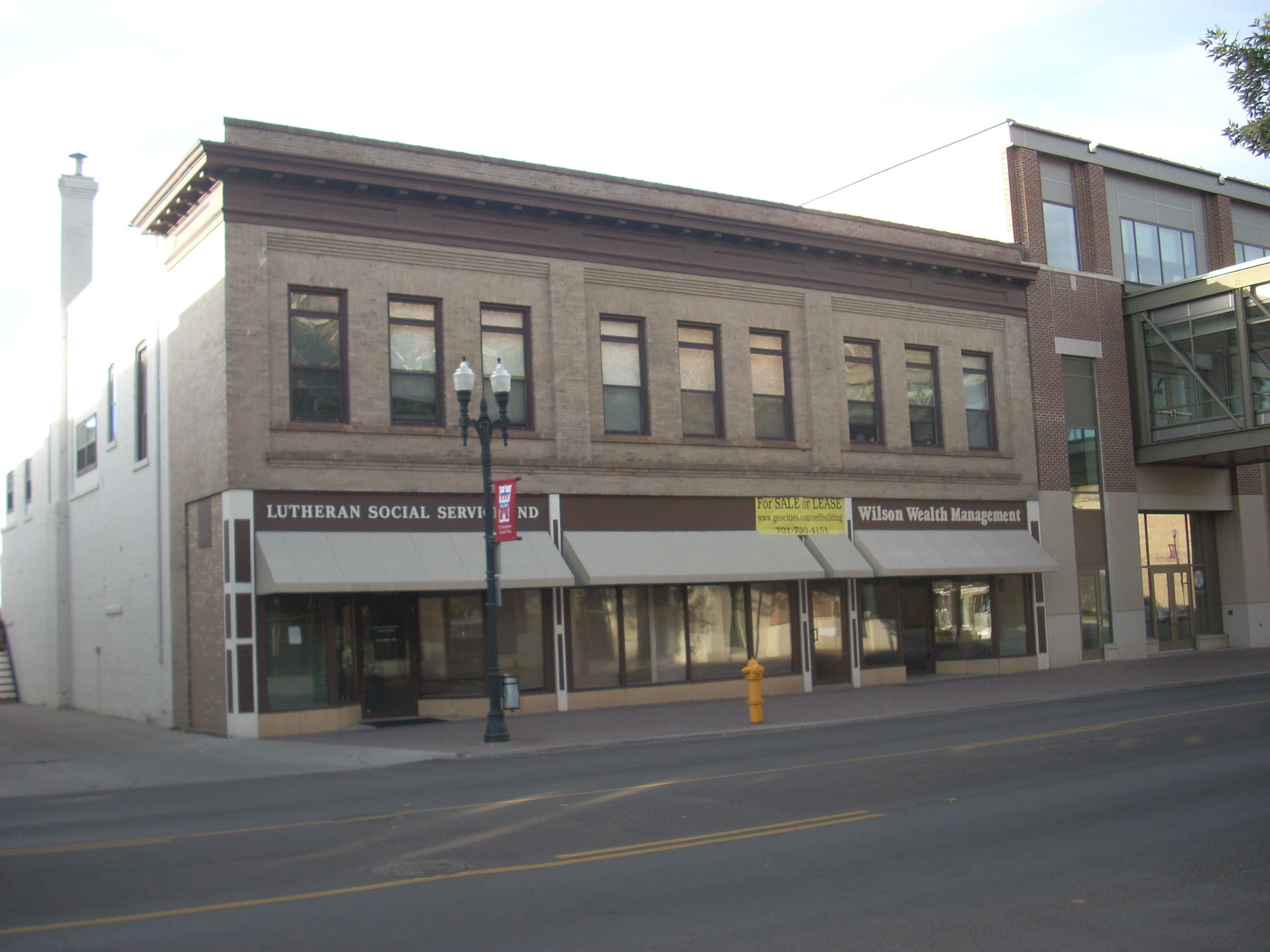

- Location within North Dakota Location within the United States
- Location: 408-412 DeMers Ave., Grand Forks, North Dakota
- Coordinates: 47°55′28″N 97°1′54″W
- Area: less than 1 acre (0.40 ha)
- Built: 1909
- Architectural style: Early Commercial
- MPS: Downtown Grand Forks MRA
- NRHP reference No.: 82001342
- Added to NRHP: October 26, 1982

Wright Block is a property in Grand Forks, North Dakota that was listed on the National Register of Historic Places in 1982.

Also known as Neil's Block, it was built in 1909. It includes Early Commercial architecture style.

When listed the property included just the one contributing building. The listing is for an area of less than 1 acre (0.40 ha).

Along with Clifford Annex, the Telephone Co. Building, the Dinnie Block, and Golden Square, the Wright Block was one of many "commercial vernacular brick buildings with classical revival details" that were built during a major building boom, with high quality brickwork.

The listing is described in its NRHP nomination document.
