= Skarsbo Apartments =

- U.S. National Register of Historic Places
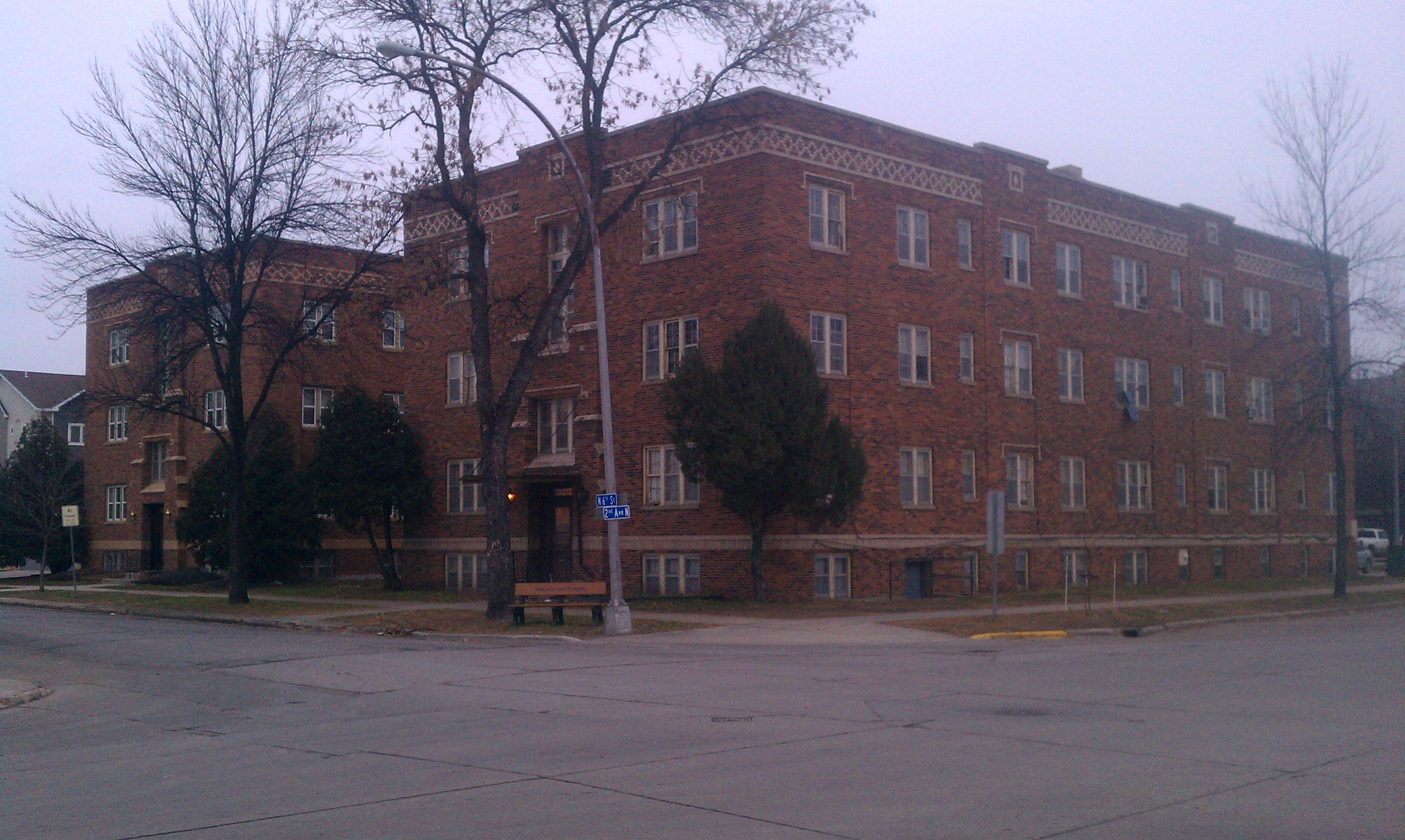

- Location within North Dakota
- Location: 204 and 210 North Sixth Street, Grand Forks, North Dakota
- Coordinates: 47.924596°N 97.03596°W
- Built: 1928
- Architect: Theodore B. Wells
- Architectural style: Late 19th & 20th Century Revivals
- NRHP reference No.: 13000634
- Added to NRHP: August 27, 2013

The Skarsbo Apartments is a group of buildings located at 204 and 210 North Sixth Street, Grand Forks, North Dakota which were added to the National Register of Historic Places on 27 August 2013. The complex consists of two nearly identical brick apartment buildings and an associated caretakers cottage. The buildings are considered to be excellent examples of apartment buildings built in Grand Forks in the late 1920s.
