= Viets Hotel =

- Formerly listed on the U.S. National Register of Historic Places
- Location within North Dakota Location within the United States
- Location: 309–311 3rd St., S., Grand Forks, North Dakota
- Coordinates: 47°55′22″N 97°1′30″W
- Area: less than 1 acre (0.40 ha)
- Built: 1876
- Architectural style: Greek Revival, Vernacular
- MPS: Downtown Grand Forks MRA
- NRHP reference No.: 82001341

Significant dates
- Added to NRHP: October 26, 1982
- Removed from NRHP: July 13, 2018

Viets Hotel was an 1876 vernacular Greek Revival building in Grand Forks, North Dakota. In proceeding years it had been the Richardson House (by 1884), a subdivided residence (by 1896), the Hall Hotel (from around 1906 until at least 1938), Hotel Apartments (1940), Hall Apartments (1942–88), and Bachellor Apartments (1989–97).

The listing was proposed in a 1981 study of Downtown Grand Forks historical resources., and it was listed on the National Register of Historic Places in 1982.

The structure was heavily damaged after the 1997 Red River flood and destroyed by fire in 2000. The location is now occupied by a dike. It was officially delisted from the National Register in 2018.

== See also ==
- Building at 317 S. 3rd St., which sometimes housed overflow hotel patrons
