= Speed Printing =

- U.S. National Register of Historic Places
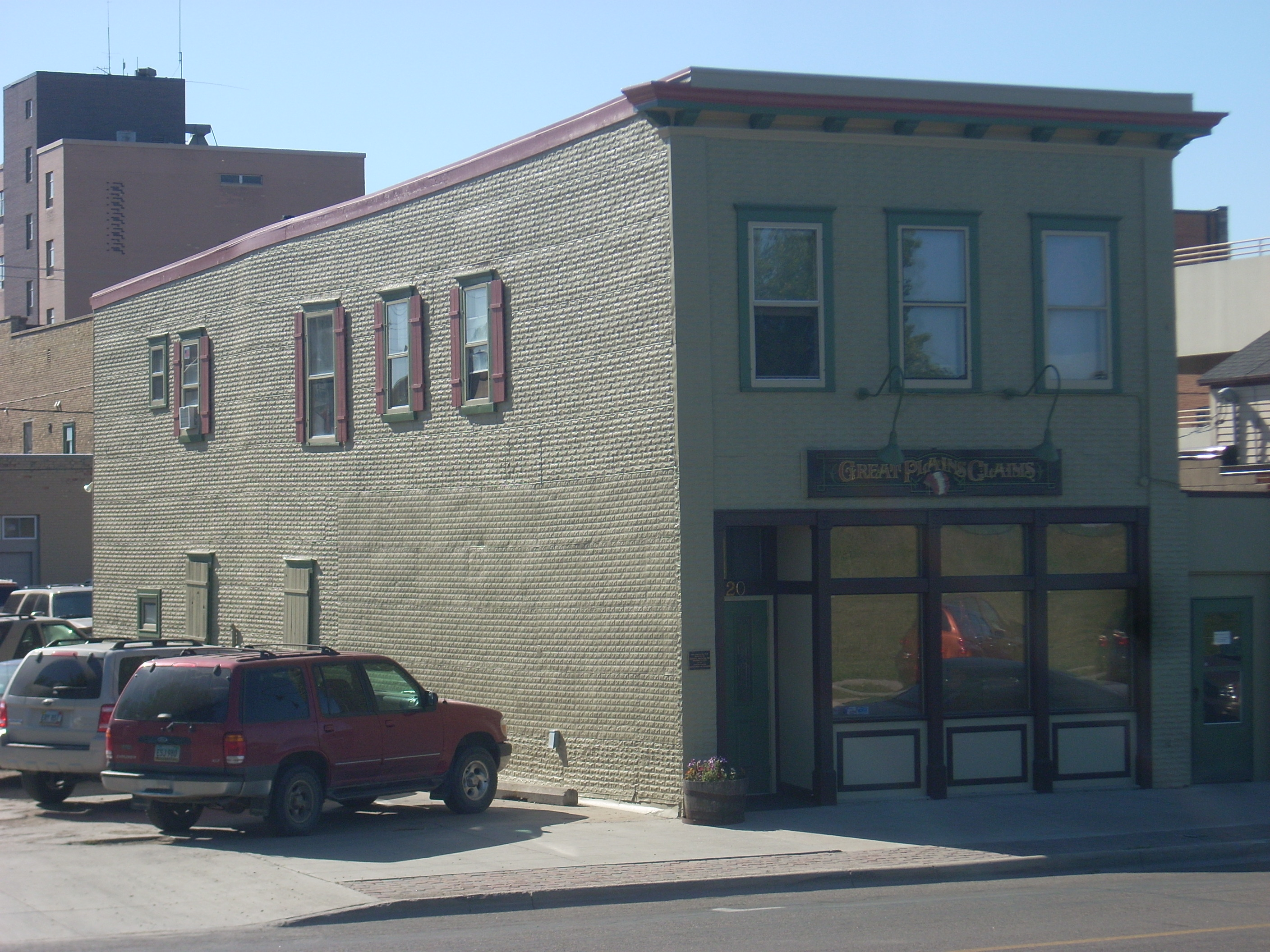

- Location within North Dakota Location within the United States
- Location: 220 S. 3rd St., Grand Forks, North Dakota
- Coordinates: 47°55′23″N 97°1′35″W
- Area: less than 1 acre (0.40 ha)
- Built: 1889
- Architectural style: Early Frame Vernacular
- MPS: Downtown Grand Forks MRA
- NRHP reference No.: 82001337
- Added to NRHP: October 26, 1982

Speed Printing is a building in Grand Forks, North Dakota that was listed on the National Register of Historic Places in 1982.

It was built in 1889, as part of a construction boom resulting from the completion of the railroad, and includes "Early Frame Vernacular" architecture.
