= Roller Office Supply =

Coordinates: 47°55′31.3″N 97°1′51.7″W

- U.S. National Register of Historic Places
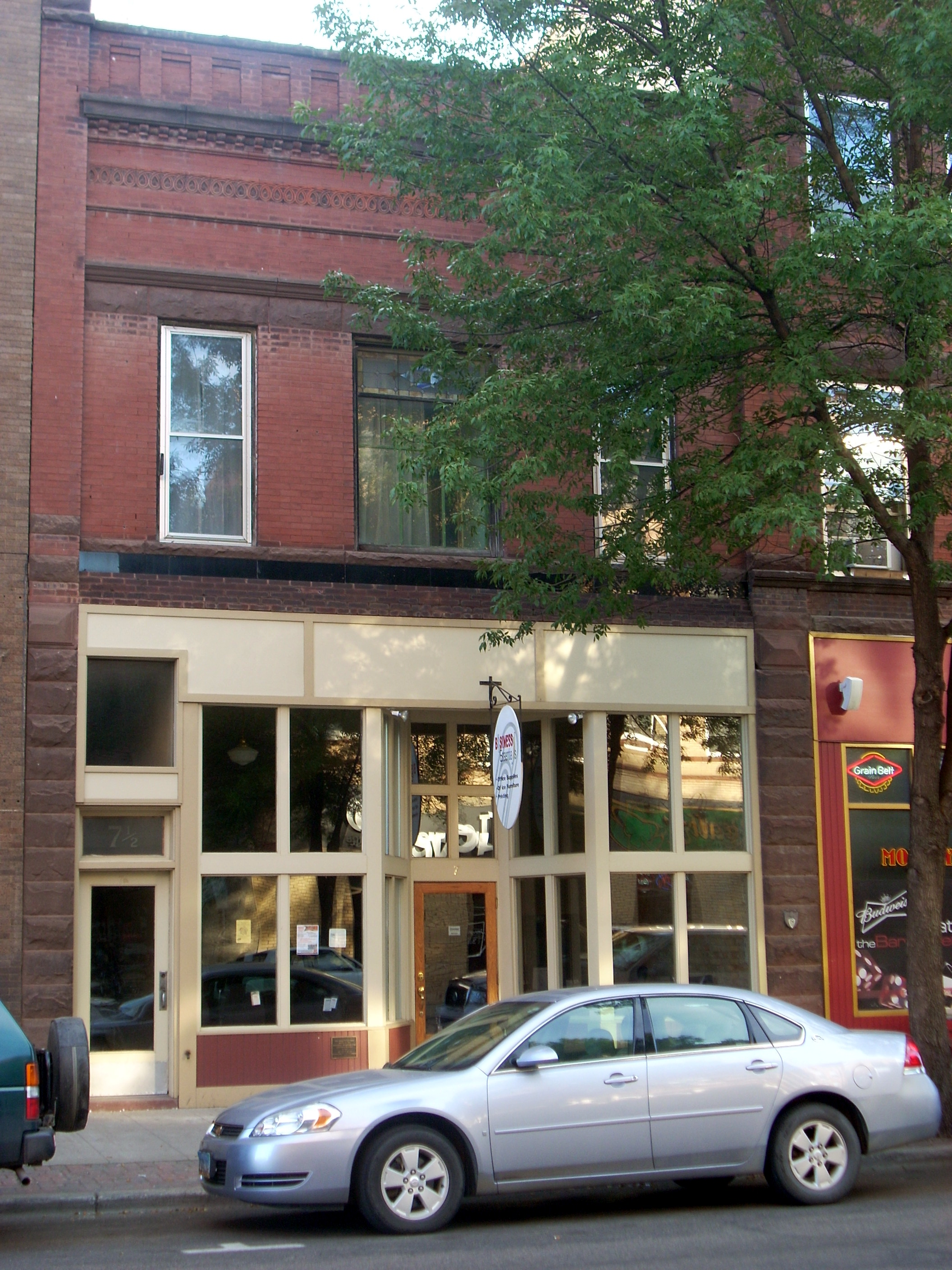

- Location within North Dakota Location within the United States
- Location: 7 N. 3rd St., Grand Forks, North Dakota
- Area: less than 1 acre (0.40 ha)
- Architectural style: Early Commercial Vernacular
- MPS: Downtown Grand Forks MRA
- NRHP reference No.: 82001336
- Added to NRHP: October 26, 1982

Roller Office Supply is a property in Grand Forks, North Dakota that was listed on the National Register of Historic Places in 1982. It was deemed significant architecturally as one of just two red brick / stone trimmed commercial buildings in Grand Forks from the 1888-1892 period (the other is Iddings Block).

It is an Early Commercial-style two-story brick rectangular-plan building.

The listing was for an area of less than one acre with just the one contributing building.

The property was covered in a 1981 study of Downtown Grand Forks historical resources.

== See also ==
- Iddings Block
