= Martin V. Linwell House =

Historic house in North Dakota, United States

- Linwell, Martin V., House
- U.S. National Register of Historic Places
- Location within North Dakota Location within the United States
- Location: 316 S. Raymond St., Northwood, North Dakota
- Coordinates: 47°43′56″N 97°34′5″W
- Area: less than 1 acre (0.40 ha)
- Built: 1895
- Architectural style: Queen Anne
- NRHP reference No.: 80002914
- Added to NRHP: February 28, 1980

The Martin V. Linwell House is "one of the finest remaining examples of Late Victorian architecture in North Dakota." It is a property in Northwood, North Dakota that was listed on the National Register of Historic Places in 1980. It was built in 1895 and includes Queen Anne architecture.
