= 312 Kittson Avenue =

- Building at 312 Kittson Ave.
- U.S. National Register of Historic Places
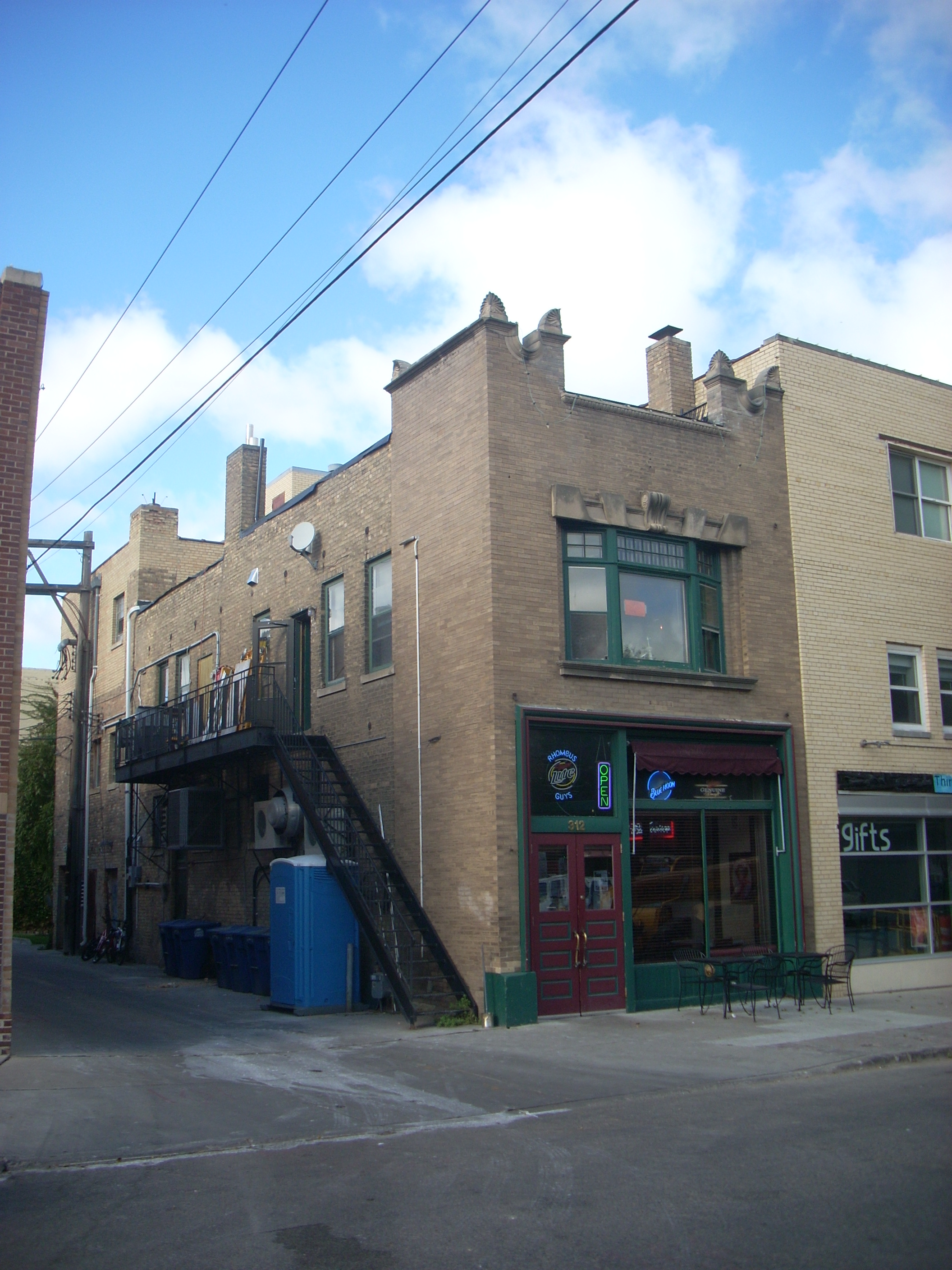
- Building at 312 Kittson Avenue, Grand Forks, North Dakota.

- Location within North Dakota Location within the United States
- Location: 312 Kittson Ave., Grand Forks, North Dakota
- Coordinates: 47°55′27″N 97°1′45″W
- Area: less than one acre
- Built: 1907
- Architect: Johnson, Sander; Larson, Pete
- Architectural style: Early Commercial
- MPS: Downtown Grand Forks MRA
- NRHP reference No.: 82001317
- Added to NRHP: October 26, 1982

The building at 312 Kittson Ave, Grand Forks, North Dakota is a two-story brick commercial vernacular style building with classical details built by Swedish-American builder Sander Johnson in 1907. It is part of the Downtown Grand Forks Historic District.

The building is constructed of brick, Hebron on the front and common on the sides and back. Its quality of workmanship, brickwork, and carpentry are notable. The first floor consists of a common wood store front with a limestone molding. The second floor features a bay window flanked by recessed brick work with a stone sill and a limestone keystone arch. The roof line is decorated with an egg-and-dart limestone cap decorated with a wrought-iron crest incorporating the building date. This cresting is flanked by two corner merlons which are capped by limestone moldings and antefixes. The second floor originally held an apartment.

The builder, Sander Johnson, moved to North Dakota from Sweden in 1902, building 312 Kittson Ave just five years later. The building has a European ambiance. This building was the first built by Johnson in his 60-year career as a builder and contractor in North Dakota and the Red River Valley. Johnson and his building companies also built the Grand Forks Masonic Temple and the Chester Fritz Library.
