= Building at 201 S. 3rd St. =

- U.S. National Register of Historic Places
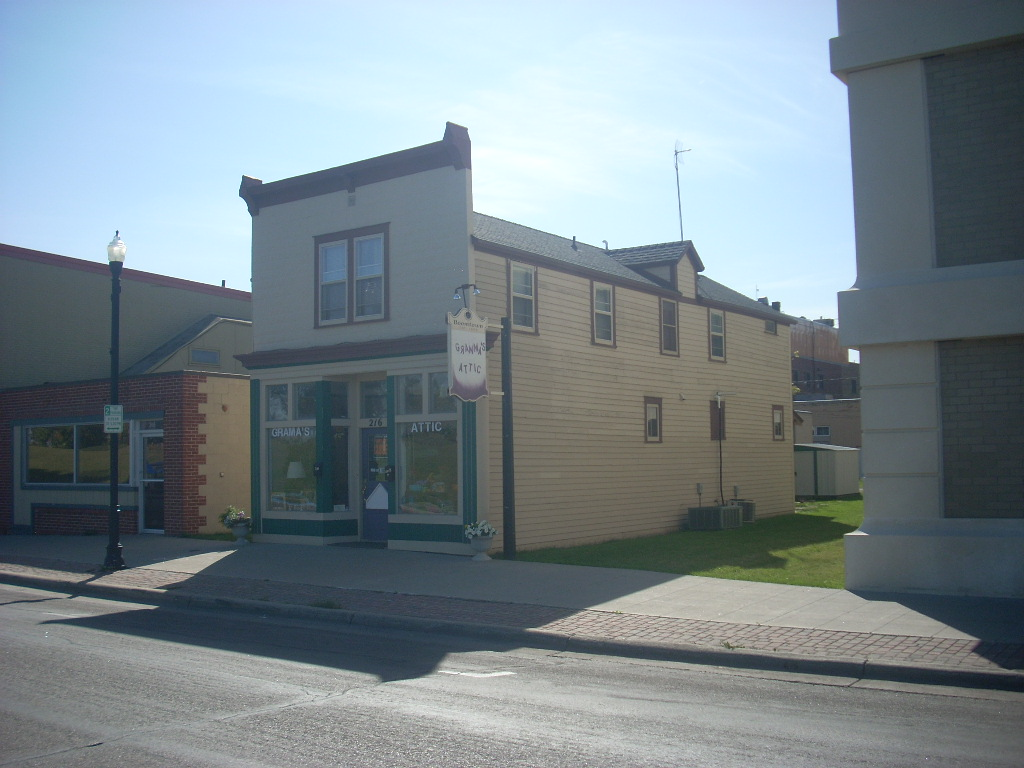

- Location within North Dakota Location within the United States
- Location: 201 S. 3rd St., Grand Forks, North Dakota
- Coordinates: 47°55′25″N 97°1′37″W
- Area: less than 1 acre (0.40 ha)
- Built: 1888
- MPS: Downtown Grand Forks MRA
- NRHP reference No.: 82001315
- Added to NRHP: October 26, 1982

The Building at 201 S. 3rd St. is a property in Grand Forks, North Dakota that was listed on the National Register of Historic Places in 1982.

It is a 1 1/2-story commercial building that was built in 1888, when it replaced a small frame building that had housed a harness shop. It is "one of three frame storefront buildings in Grand Forks dating from the early period of frame construction along South Third Street, which was the original main thoroughfare in the city between 1870 and the coming of the railroad and the great Dakota Boom in the 1880s. It represents the first period of early boom town building in the city."

The listing is just for the one building, on an area of less than 1 acre (0.40 ha). At the time of listing, the building was vacant.

The listing is described in its North Dakota Cultural Resources Survey document.

The property was covered in a 1981 study of Downtown Grand Forks historical resources.

After the Red River Flood of 1997, the building was moved in its entirety across the street to 216 S. 3rd, between a parking ramp and a pre-existing brick building, keeping the structure's integrity intact.
