= Red River Valley Brick Co. =

- Formerly listed on the U.S. National Register of Historic Places
- Location within North Dakota Location within the United States
- Location: 215 S. 3rd St., Grand Forks, North Dakota
- Coordinates: 47°55′25″N 97°1′37″W
- Area: less than 1 acre (0.40 ha)
- Built: 1909
- Architectural style: Early Commercial, Vernacular
- MPS: Downtown Grand Forks MRA
- NRHP reference No.: 82001335
- Removed from NRHP: September 23, 2004

Red River Valley Brick Co. is or was a property in Grand Forks, North Dakota that was removed from the National Register of Historic Places in 2004.

It was built or has other significance in 1909. The listing described Early Commercial, Vernacular, and other architecture. When listed the property included just one contributing building on an area of less than 1 acre (0.40 ha).

The property was covered in a 1981 study of Downtown Grand Forks historical resources.
