= Building at 205 DeMers Ave. =

- Formerly listed on the U.S. National Register of Historic Places
- Location within North Dakota Location within the United States
- Location: 205 DeMers Ave., Grand Forks, North Dakota
- Coordinates: 47°55′32″N 97°1′46″W
- Area: less than 1 acre (0.40 ha)
- Built: 1888
- Architectural style: Early Commercial, Vernacular
- MPS: Downtown Grand Forks MRA
- NRHP reference No.: 82001316

Significant dates
- Added to NRHP: October 26, 1982
- Removed from NRHP: July 13, 2018

The building at 205 DeMers Ave. is a property in Grand Forks, North Dakota that was listed on the National Register of Historic Places in 1982. It was destroyed by the 1997 Red River flood, and was officially delisted in 2018.

It was built in 1888, but its first occupant is not known. It was later occupied by a harness-maker shop. According to Joe and Norene Roberts, the building is significant for its architecture, as "one of two early brick-veneered frame commercial buildings which represent the first generation of substantial business blocks in the city of Grand Forks."

It includes Early Commercial, vernacular, and other architecture.

The listing was for an area of less than one acre with just one contributing building.

The listing is described in the North Dakota Cultural Resources Survey document.

The property was covered in a 1981 study of Downtown Grand Forks historical resources.
