= Telephone Co. Building (Grand Forks, North Dakota) =

- U.S. National Register of Historic Places
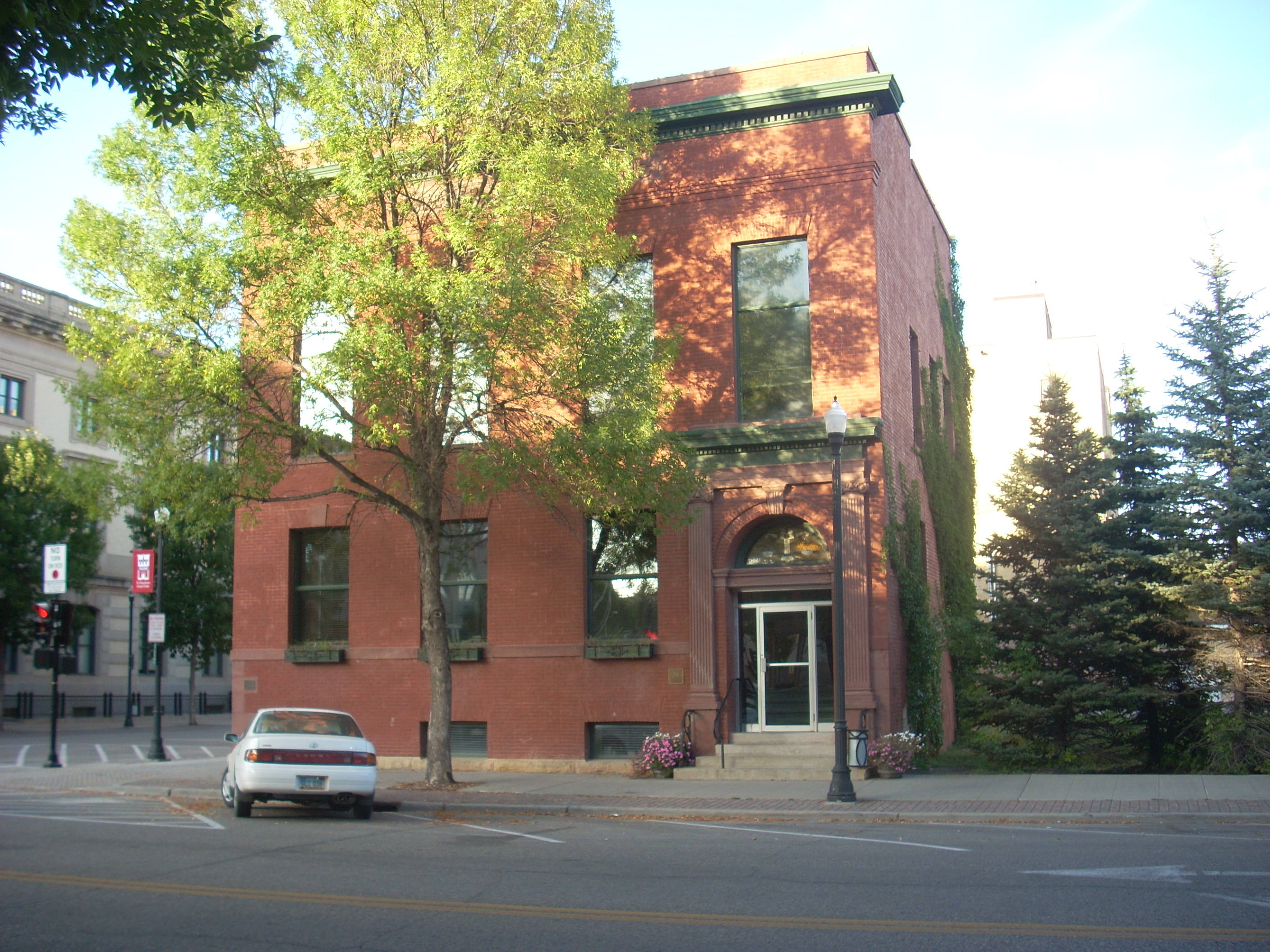
- Location: 24 N. 4th St., Grand Forks, North Dakota
- Coordinates: 47°55′31″N 97°1′55″W
- Area: less than 1 acre (0.40 ha)
- Built: 1904
- Architectural style: Early Commercial; Vernacular-Classical
- MPS: Downtown Grand Forks MRA
- NRHP reference No.: 82001340
- Added to NRHP: October 26, 1982

The Telephone Co. Building in Grand Forks, North Dakota, United States, was built in 1904. It was listed on the National Register of Historic Places in 1982.

It includes Early Commercial, "Vernacular-Classical Detail", and other architecture.

When listed the property included just the one contributing building on an area of less than 1 acre (0.40 ha).

The listing is described in its North Dakota Cultural Resources Survey document.

Along with Wright Block, the Clifford Annex, the Dinnie Block, and Golden Square, the Telephone Co. Building was one of many "commercial vernacular brick buildings with classical revival details" that were built during a major building boom, with high quality brickwork. It was built in 1904 by the Northwestern Telephone Exchange Company, which later became Northwestern Bell. This replaced a previous exchange that was located on the fourth floor of an office building, which had some accessibility problems. A 1901 author pointed out that the cable ran into the office from a nearby pole and was unsightly, and that the wiring inside the building was not very orderly either. The building was rather crowded. The company was in the process of buying a lot for the new exchange building.
