= Dinnie Block =

- Formerly listed on the U.S. National Register of Historic Places
- Location within North Dakota Location within the United States
- Location: 109 N. 3rd Ave., Grand Forks, North Dakota
- Coordinates: 47°55′34.2″N 97°1′56.5″W
- Area: less than 1 acre (0.40 ha)
- Built: 1907
- Architectural style: Early Commercial, Vernacular-Classical ornamen(tation?), Other
- MPS: Downtown Grand Forks MRA
- NRHP reference No.: 82001321
- Removed from NRHP: September 23, 2004

Dinnie Block was a property in Grand Forks, North Dakota. It was removed from the National Register of Historic Places in 2004.

Along with Wright Block, the Telephone Co. Building, the Clifford Annex, and Golden Square, the Dinnie Block was one of many "commercial vernacular brick buildings with classical revival details" that were built during a major building boom, with high quality brickwork. The Dinnie Block was built in 1907.

The National Register listing covered Early Commercial, "Vernacular-Classical ornamen"(tation?), and Other architecture. The listing was for an area of less than one acre with just one contributing building.

Its listing status is RN, which means removed from National Register.

== See also ==
- 1997 Red River flood in the United States
