= Administration Building for the City of Grand Forks at the Grand Forks Airport =

- Grand Forks City Hall
- U.S. National Register of Historic Places
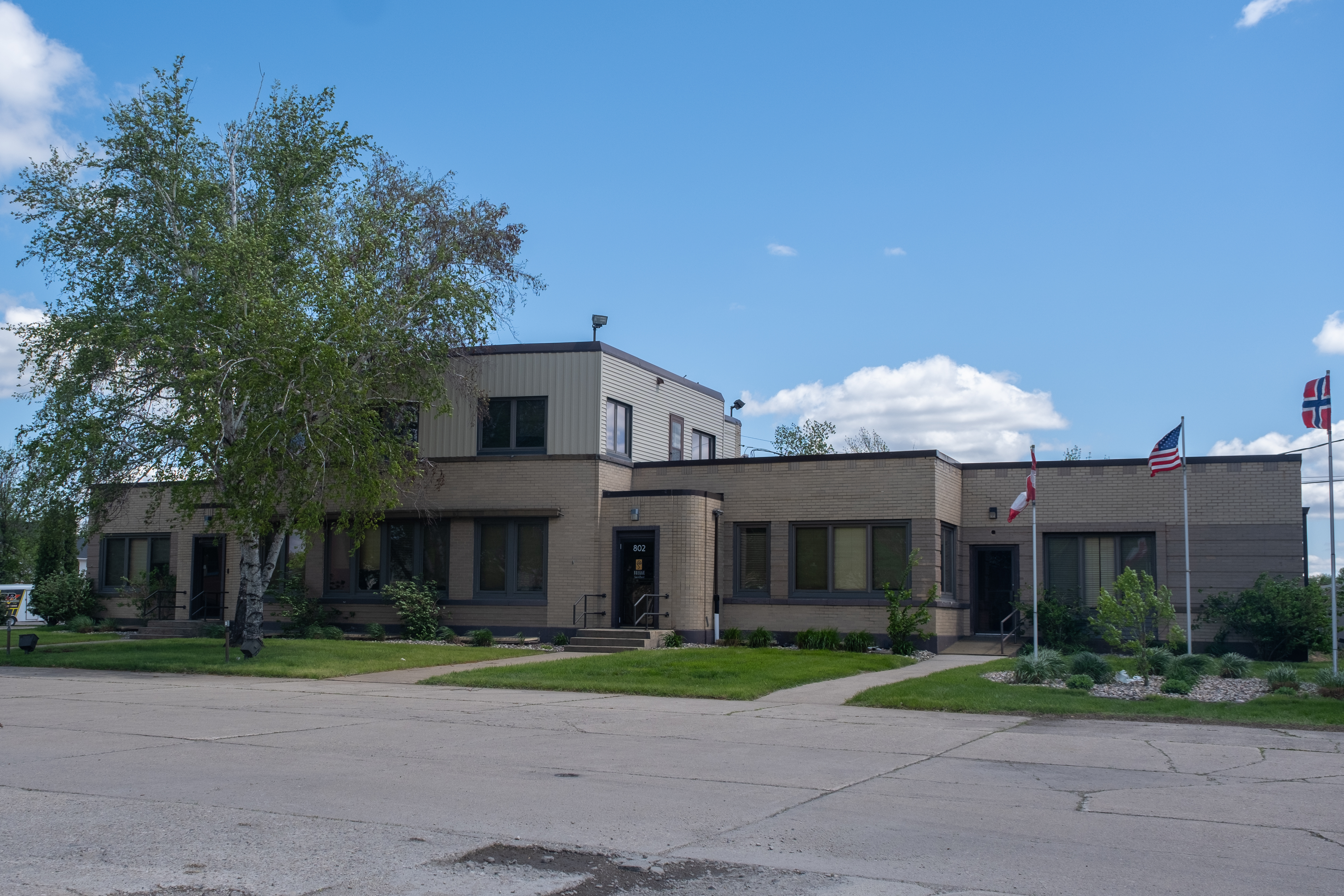

- Location within North Dakota
- Location: 802 North 43rd St., Grand Forks, North Dakota
- Coordinates: 47°55′40″N 97°05′28″W
- Built: 1941-43; 1949
- Architectural style: WPA Modern, Streamline Moderne
- MPS: Federal Relief Construction in North Dakota, 1931-1943, MPS
- NRHP reference No.: 100005844
- Added to NRHP: December 3, 2020

The Administration Building for the City of Grand Forks at the Grand Forks Airport was listed on the National Register of Historic Places in 2020. It is a Streamline Moderne- and WPA Moderne-style building, constructed in 1941–43 and expanded in 1949.

The building was the terminal for the airport, and identified the location for arriving passengers. It had "Grand Forks N.D." emblazened across the top of its second floor, with "Municipal Air Port" in smaller letters below.

It has also been known as the Grand Forks Municipal Airport Administration Building and Terminal, and, in 2020, is Brekke Tours and Travel.

It was used for some period as a police station, and had holding cells in its basement. It was bought from the City of Grand Forks by travel company owner Arne Brekke in 1977, after which it was known as the Brekke Building. It remains, in 2020, office space for Brekke Tours and Travel and other leased-out space.

Its listing on the National Register was a project of the Grand Forks Historic Preservation Commission, which commissioned the NRHP nomination.

It is consistent with MPS study Federal Relief Construction in North Dakota, 1931-1943.

It is located approximately 2.5 miles (4.0 km) to the northwest of Grand Fork's, close to Interstate 29, which was put in approximately over one of the runways, the north–south runway upon which the terminal donne sur, of the former airport.

Its current address is 802 N 43rd Street, but it was previously accessed from 42nd Street.

It was deemed significant:

the Administration Building functioned as the airport’s terminal. It is an illustrative example of WPA (Work Projects Administration) Modern and Streamline Moderne architecture. This WPA-built airport terminal facilitated air travel that modernized and connected the community regionally and beyond. The Grand Forks airport’s role in military aviation training contributed to national defense and war efforts. Although airport services were eventually transferred to a new location, and the Administration Building repurposed, the building stands as a reminder of Grand Forks’ early aviation history at the site of the city’s original airport. The terminal, with its modest design indicative of New Deal architecture, is a symbolic reminder of President Franklin D. Roosevelt’s economic relief and jobs-building programs, which, in part, helped to transform American air transportation as the United States strived to dig itself out of the Great Depression and defeat fascism abroad during World War II."
