= Edgar Building =

- U.S. National Register of Historic Places
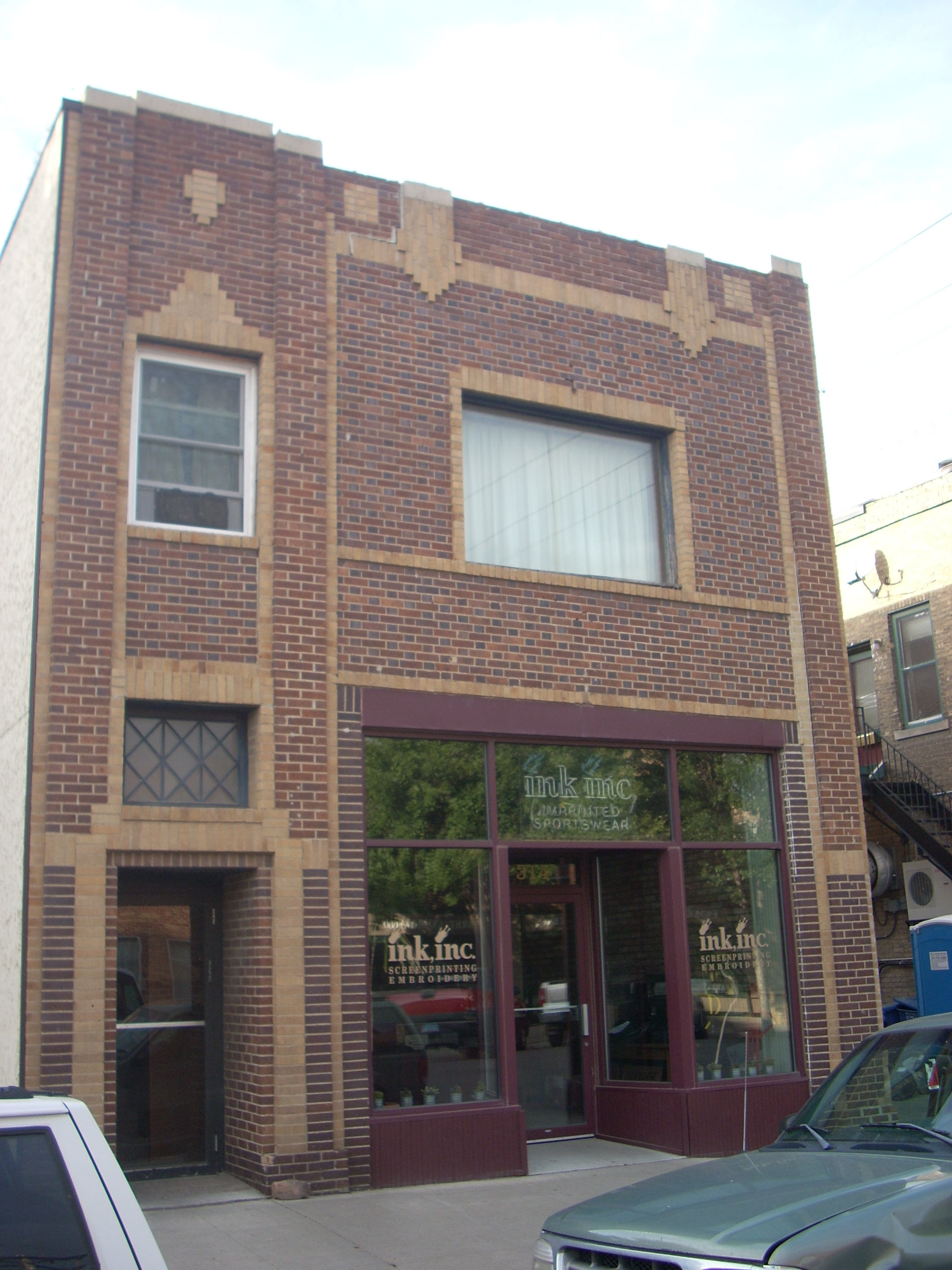
- Edgar Building, 314 Kittson Ave, Grand Forks, North Dakota. Listed on the National Register of Historic Places on April 15, 1983.

- Location within North Dakota Location within the United States
- Location: 314 Kittson Ave., Grand Forks, North Dakota
- Coordinates: 47°55′27″N 97°1′46″W
- Area: less than 1 acre (0.40 ha)
- Built: c.1890-c.1906
- Architectural style: Zig zag moderne
- MPS: Downtown Grand Forks MRA
- NRHP reference No.: 83001934
- Added to NRHP: April 15, 1983

The Edgar Building is located in Grand Forks, North Dakota that was listed on the National Register of Historic Places in 1983. Its construction date is unclear.

It features Zig zag Moderne architecture.

The listing was for an area of less than one acre, with just one contributing building.

The listing is described in the North Dakota Cultural Resources Survey document.

The property was included in a 1981 study of historical resources in Downtown Grand Forks.
