= Building at 317 S. 3rd St. =

- Formerly listed on the U.S. National Register of Historic Places
- Location within North Dakota Location within the United States
- Location: 317 S. 3rd St., Grand Forks, North Dakota
- Coordinates: 47°55′21″N 97°1′30″W
- Built: c. 1884
- Architectural style: Early Commercial, Vernacular
- MPS: Downtown Grand Forks MRA
- NRHP reference No.: 82001318

Significant dates
- Added to NRHP: October 26, 1982
- Removed from NRHP: July 13, 2018

The Building at 317 S. 3rd St. in Grand Forks, North Dakota was built circa 1884 in a style that has been described as Early Commercial and Vernacular.

Among other uses it lodged overflow patrons of the next door Richardson House.

The building was listed on the National Register of Historic Places in 1982. It was destroyed by the 1997 Grand Forks Flood, and was officially delisted in 2018.
