= Grand Forks Mercantile Building 1898 =

- U.S. National Register of Historic Places
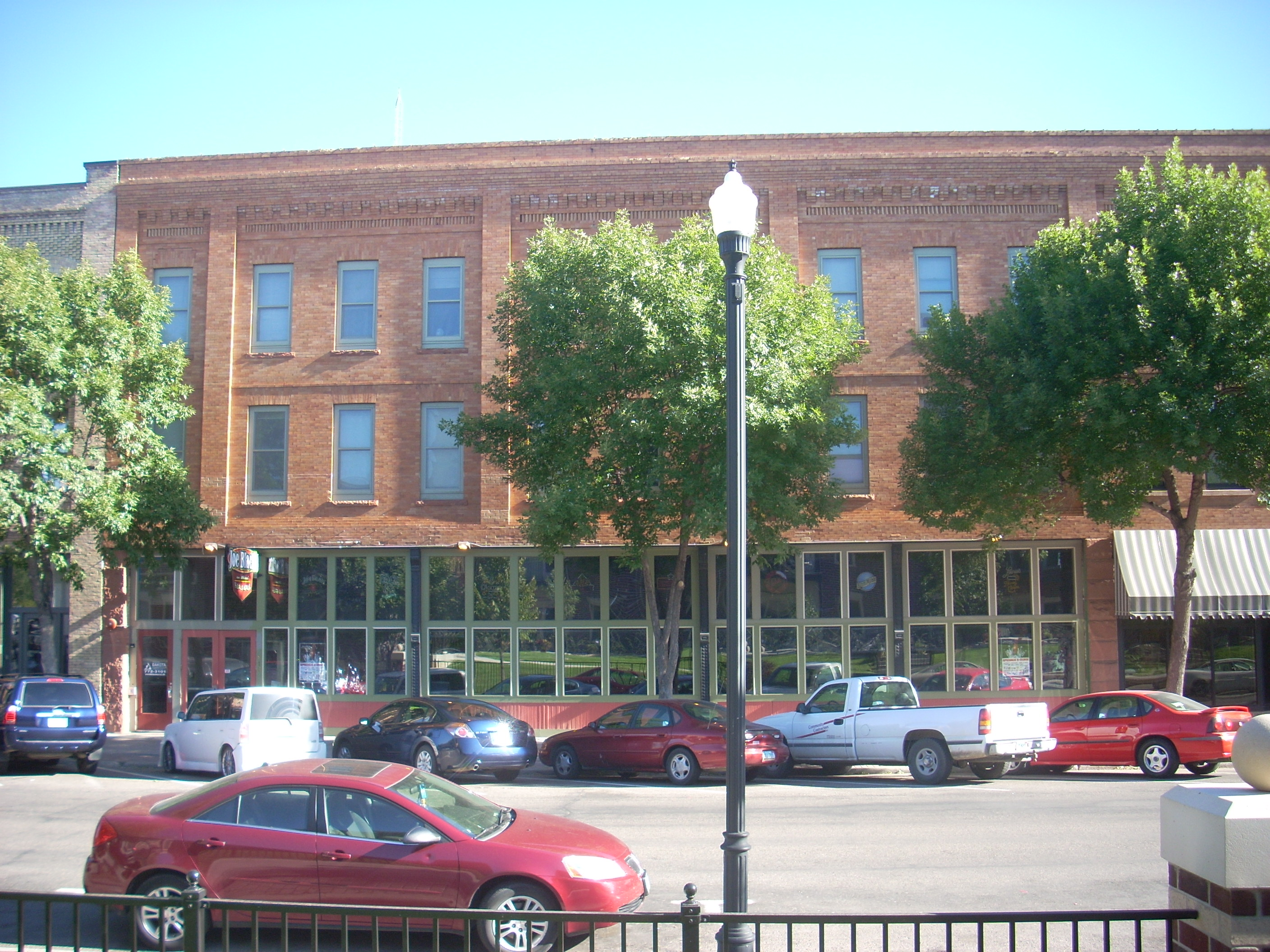
- Grand Forks Mercantile Building in 2009

- Location within North Dakota Location within the United States
- Location: 112–118 N. Third St., Grand Forks, North Dakota
- Coordinates: 47°55′42″N 97°1′56″W
- Area: less than 1 acre (0.40 ha)
- Built: 1898
- Architect: Stoltze & Schick
- Architectural style: Early Commercial
- MPS: Downtown Grand Forks MRA
- NRHP reference No.: 04000700
- Added to NRHP: July 14, 2004

Grand Forks Mercantile Building is a property in Grand Forks, North Dakota that was listed on the National Register of Historic Places (NRHP) in 2004. Built in 1898, the building includes Early Commercial architecture. Though the design has in the past been attributed to Grand Forks architect John W. Ross, the architects were Stoltze & Schick of La Crosse, Wisconsin.

It is located at 112–118 N Third Street in Grand Forks. Another building, at 124 N 3rd Street, named the Grand Forks Mercantile Co., was built in 1893 and is also listed on the NRHP. Although both buildings are within the Downtown Grand Forks area, only the 1893 one was identified for NRHP listing in a 1981 study of the area. The 1893 one was listed on the NRHP in 1982.

== See also ==
- Grand Forks Mercantile Co.
