= Grand Forks Mercantile Co. =

- U.S. National Register of Historic Places
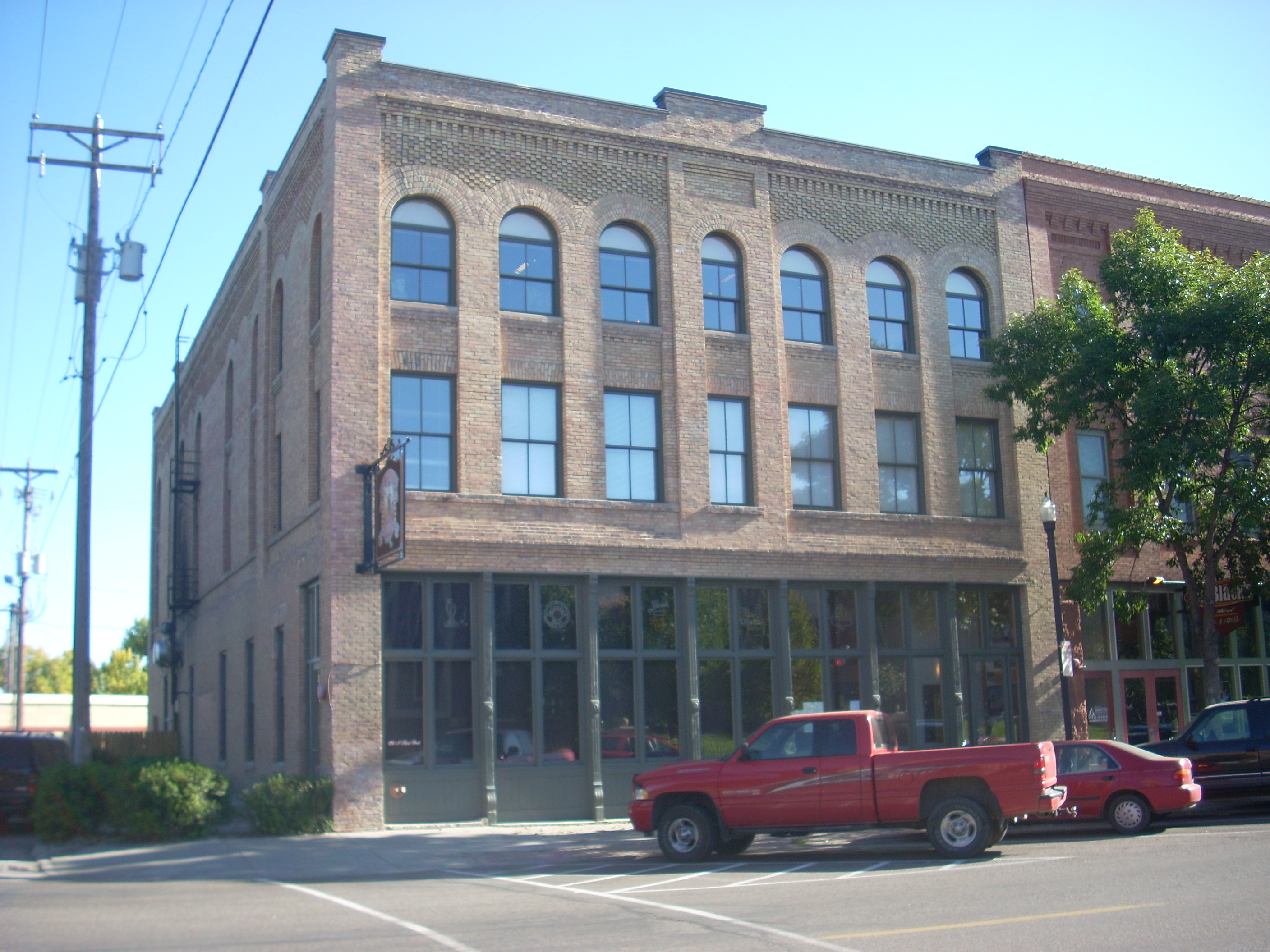
- Grand Forks Mercantile Company in 2009

- Location within North Dakota Location within the United States
- Location: 124 N. 3rd St, Grand Forks, North Dakota
- Coordinates: 47°55′36″N 97°1′56″W
- Area: less than 1 acre (0.40 ha)
- Built: 1893
- Architectural style: Early Commercial and Italianate
- MPS: Downtown Grand Forks MRA
- NRHP reference No.: 82001327
- Added to NRHP: October 26, 1982

Grand Forks Mercantile Company is a property in Grand Forks, North Dakota that was listed on the National Register of Historic Places in 1982. Built in 1893, the building includes Early Commercial and Italianate architecture.

The Flatiron Building, built in 1906, and the Iddings Block, built in 1892, are two other wholesale buildings in Grand Forks that were listed on the National Register, within the N. Third Street wholesale district.

It housed a wholesale grocery business.

== See also ==
- Grand Forks Mercantile Building 1898
