= Clifford Annex =

Building in Grand Forks, North Dakota, U.S.

- Formerly listed on the U.S. National Register of Historic Places
- Location: 407-411 DeMers Ave., Grand Forks, North Dakota
- Area: less than 1 acre (0.40 ha)
- Built: 1906
- Architectural style: Early Commercial, Vernacular, and Other
- MPS: Downtown Grand Forks MRA
- NRHP reference No.: 82001319
- Removed from NRHP: September 23, 2004

Clifford Annex was a building in Grand Forks, North Dakota. It was listed on the U.S. National Register of Historic Places, but was destroyed in the 1997 Red River flood, and was delisted in 2004.

Along with Wright Block, the Telephone Co. Building, the Dinnie Block, and Golden Square, the Clifford Annex was one of many "commercial vernacular brick buildings with classical revival details" that were built during a major building boom, with high quality brickwork.

The Clifford Annex was built in 1906. It included Early Commercial, vernacular, and other architecture.
