= The Kegs Drive-In =

- U.S. National Register of Historic Places
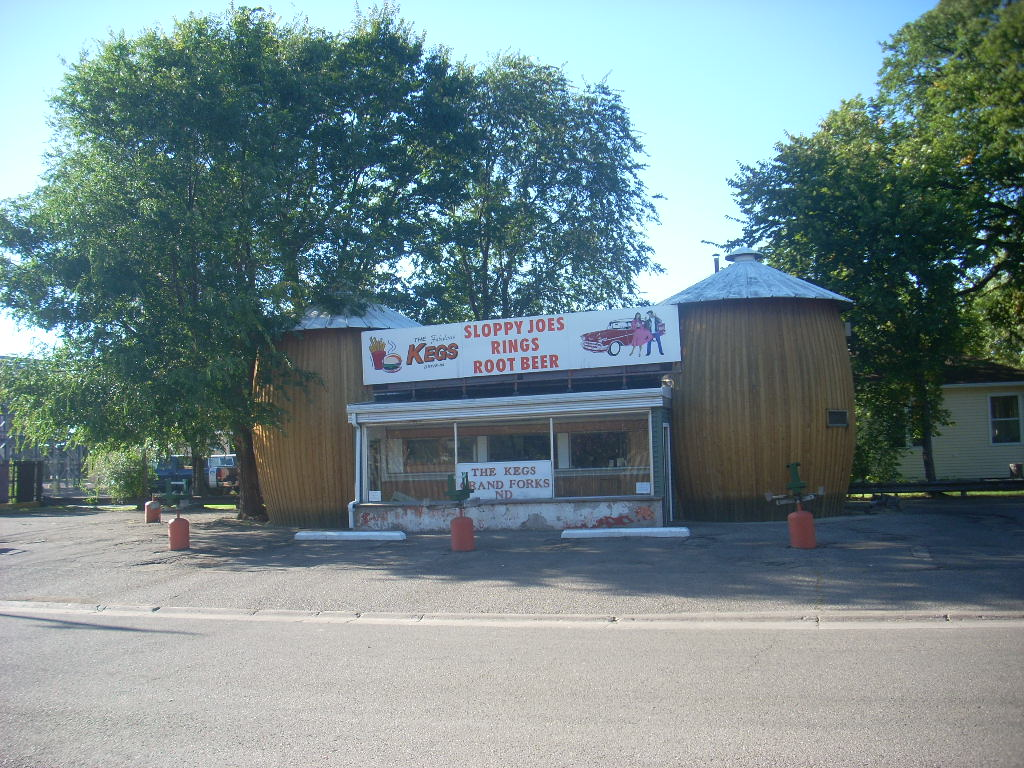

- Location within North Dakota
- Location: 901 N 5th St, Grand Forks, North Dakota
- Coordinates: 47°55′48″N 97°2′39.63″W
- Built: 1935, moved to current location 1946
- Built by: William Harry Muzzy
- Architectural style: Novelty architecture
- NRHP reference No.: 11000603
- Added to NRHP: August 24, 2011

The Kegs is a historic drive-in located in Grand Forks, North Dakota. The restaurant takes the form of two large wooden barrels. The barrel structures were originally built in 1935 as part of a chain of seven walk-up root beer stands called The Barrel by William Harry Muzzy. In 1946 the current drive-in came into being when the barrels were moved to their current location and joined by the rectangular section housing the front counter. The building was listed on the National Register of Historic Places in 2011.
