= Iddings Block =

- U.S. National Register of Historic Places
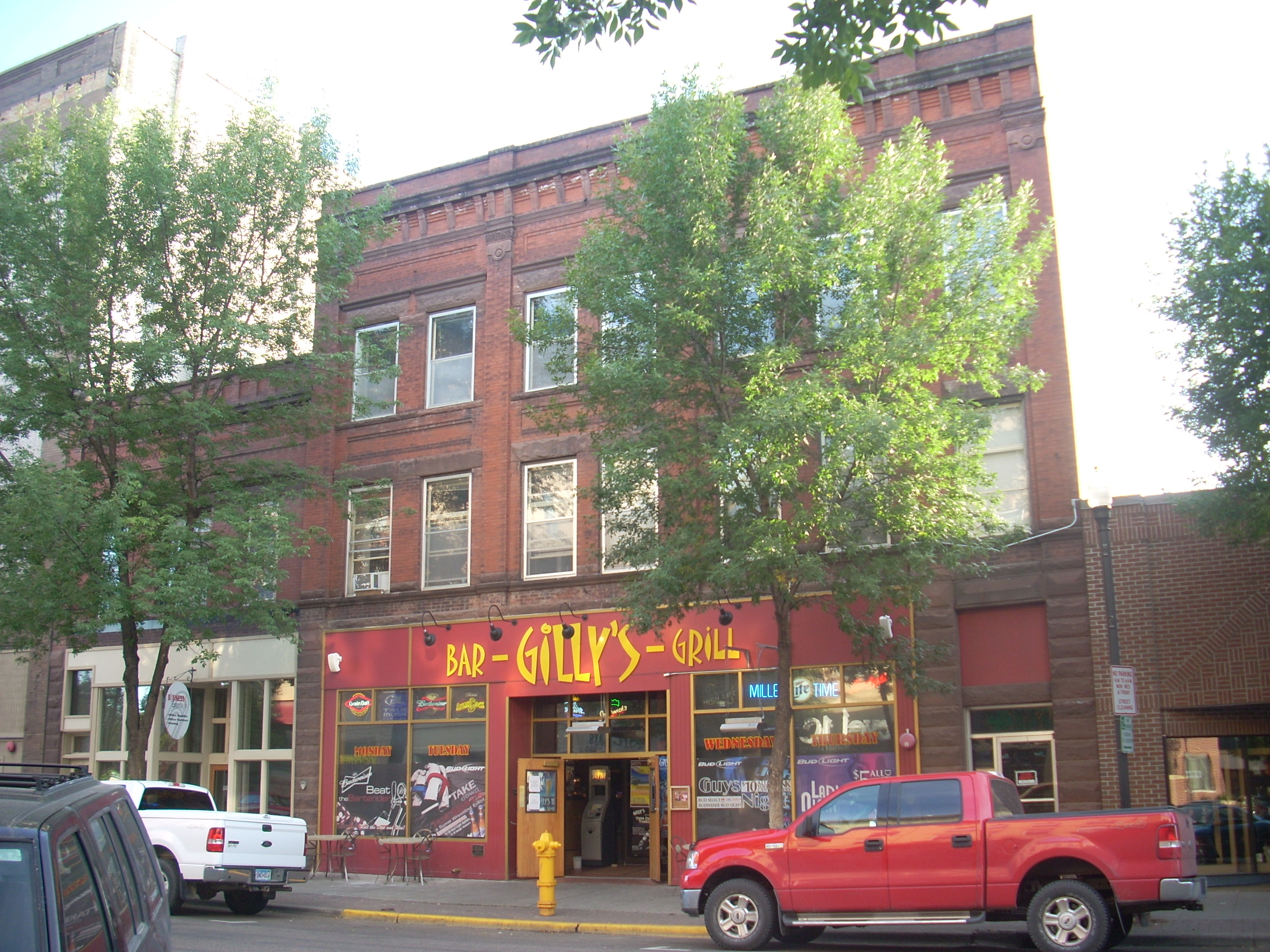

- Location within North Dakota Location within the United States
- Location: 9 N. 3rd St., Grand Forks, North Dakota
- Coordinates: 47°55′32″N 97°1′52″W
- Area: less than 1 acre (0.40 ha)
- Built: 1892
- Architectural style: Early Commercial, Vernacular
- MPS: Downtown Grand Forks MRA
- NRHP reference No.: 82001329
- Added to NRHP: October 26, 1982

The Iddings Block is a property in Grand Forks, North Dakota that was listed on the National Register of Historic Places in 1982. It was one of 13 new commercial business block buildings built in Grand Forks in 1892, and is one of just two surviving from the 1888-1892 era. During 1892 to approximately 1906-1909, it was the location of Iddings and Company, the largest bookstore and stationer in the state in that period. In 1981, it housed Ruettell's.

It includes Early Commercial.

The listing was for an area of less than one acre with just one contributing building.

The listing is described in its North Dakota Cultural Resources Survey document.

The Flatiron Building, built in 1906, and the Grand Forks Mercantile Co., built in 1893, are two other wholesale buildings in Grand Forks that were listed on the National Register, within the N. Third Street wholesale district.

== See also ==
- Roller Office Supply
