= Lyons Garage (Grand Forks, North Dakota) =

- Formerly listed on the U.S. National Register of Historic Places
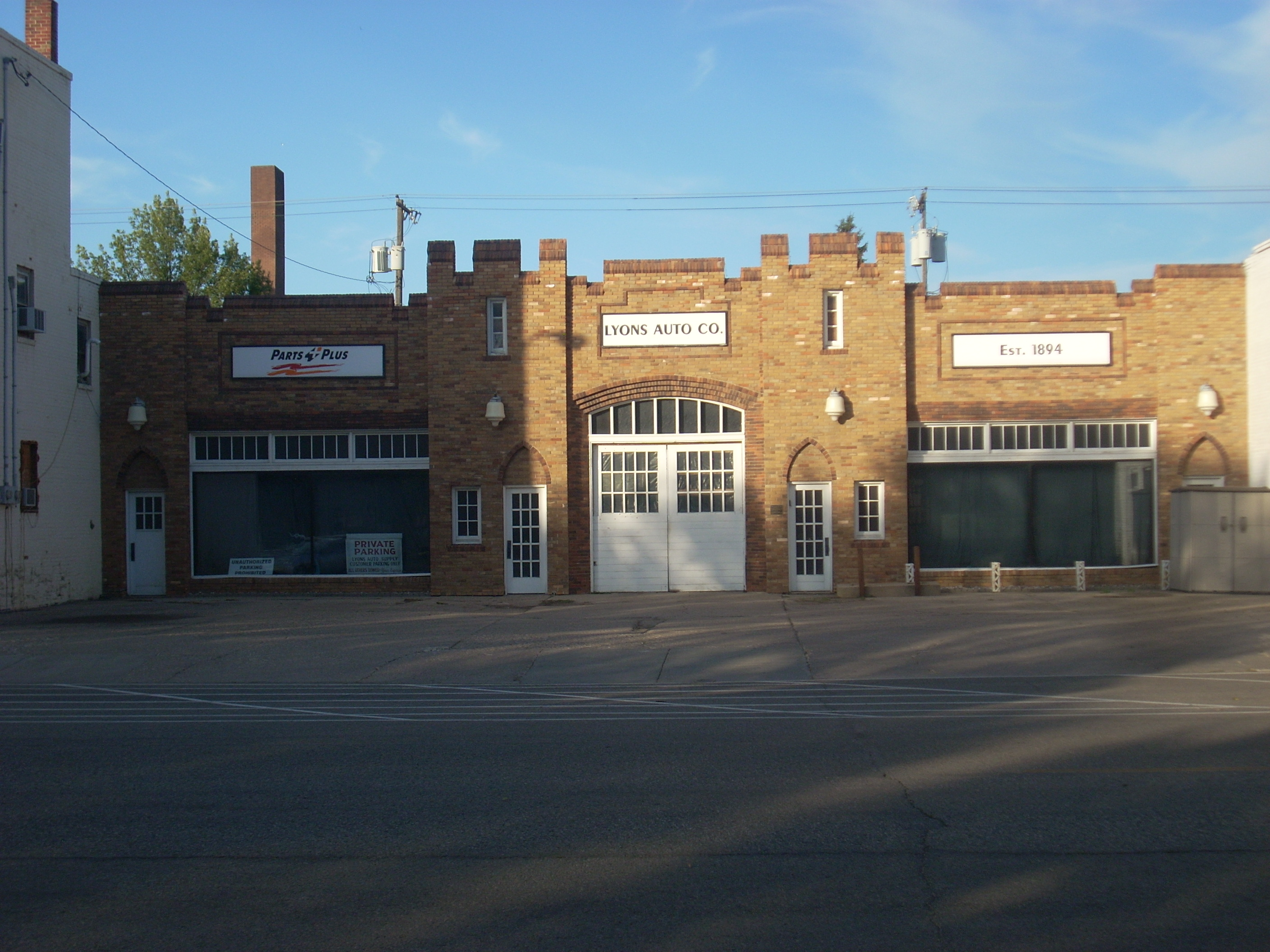

- Location within North Dakota Location within the United States
- Location: 214-218 N. 4th St., Grand Forks, North Dakota
- Coordinates: 47°55′35″N 97°2′3″W
- Area: less than 1 acre (0.40 ha)
- Built: 1929
- Architectural style: Tudor Revival
- MPS: Downtown Grand Forks MRA
- NRHP reference No.: 82001330

Significant dates
- Added to NRHP: October 26, 1982
- Removed from NRHP: October 12, 2023

Lyons Garage was a building in Grand Forks, North Dakota that was built in 1929 and was listed on the National Register of Historic Places in 1982. The rectangular building was built as an expansion of an adjacent Lyons Auto Supply company building that had been built in 1912. The 1912 building was not included in the National Register listing.

The Lyons Garage was one of two "outstanding" buildings, both one story and both "done in polychrome brick of yellow and red", that "represent the Tudor Revival", within the Downtown Grand Forks area whose historic resources were surveyed in 1981; the Northern Pacific Depot and Freight House is the other.

There had been reported paranormal activity in the building, including the apparition of small man in overalls carrying an old oil can.

The property was demolished in February 2022, and was delisted from the National Register in 2023.
