= Washington School (Grand Forks, North Dakota) =

- U.S. National Register of Historic Places
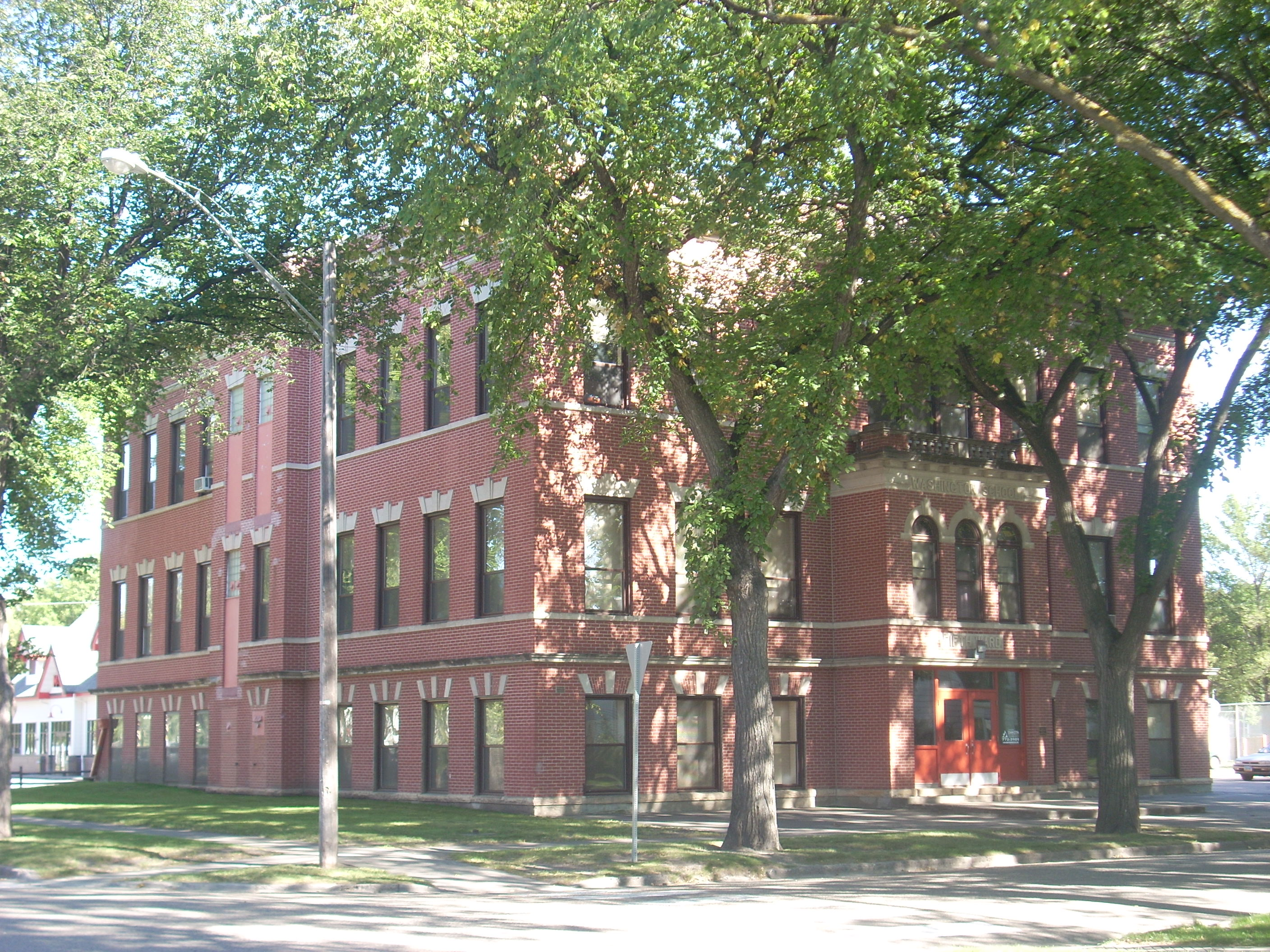
- School in 2009

- Location within North Dakota Location within the United States
- Location: 422 N. Sixth St., Grand Forks, North Dakota
- Coordinates: 47°55′34″N 97°2′18″W
- Area: 1 acre (0.40 ha)
- Built: 1907
- Architect: Edwards, William J.; Melby & Standahl
- Architectural style: Classical Revival
- NRHP reference No.: 92000035
- Added to NRHP: February 24, 1992

Washington School is a building in Grand Forks, North Dakota that was built in 1907. It was listed on the National Register of Historic Places in 1992.

It was designed by William J. Edwards in Classical Revival style, and was built by contractors Melby & Standahl. Rusticated limestone forming walls of the basement level is the only true stone used in the building; the ornamental details on the upper stories are made of cast stone.

The listing is for an area of 1 acre (0.40 ha) with just the one contributing building.
