= Grand Forks station (Northern Pacific Railway) =

- Northern Pacific Depot and Freight House
- U.S. National Register of Historic Places
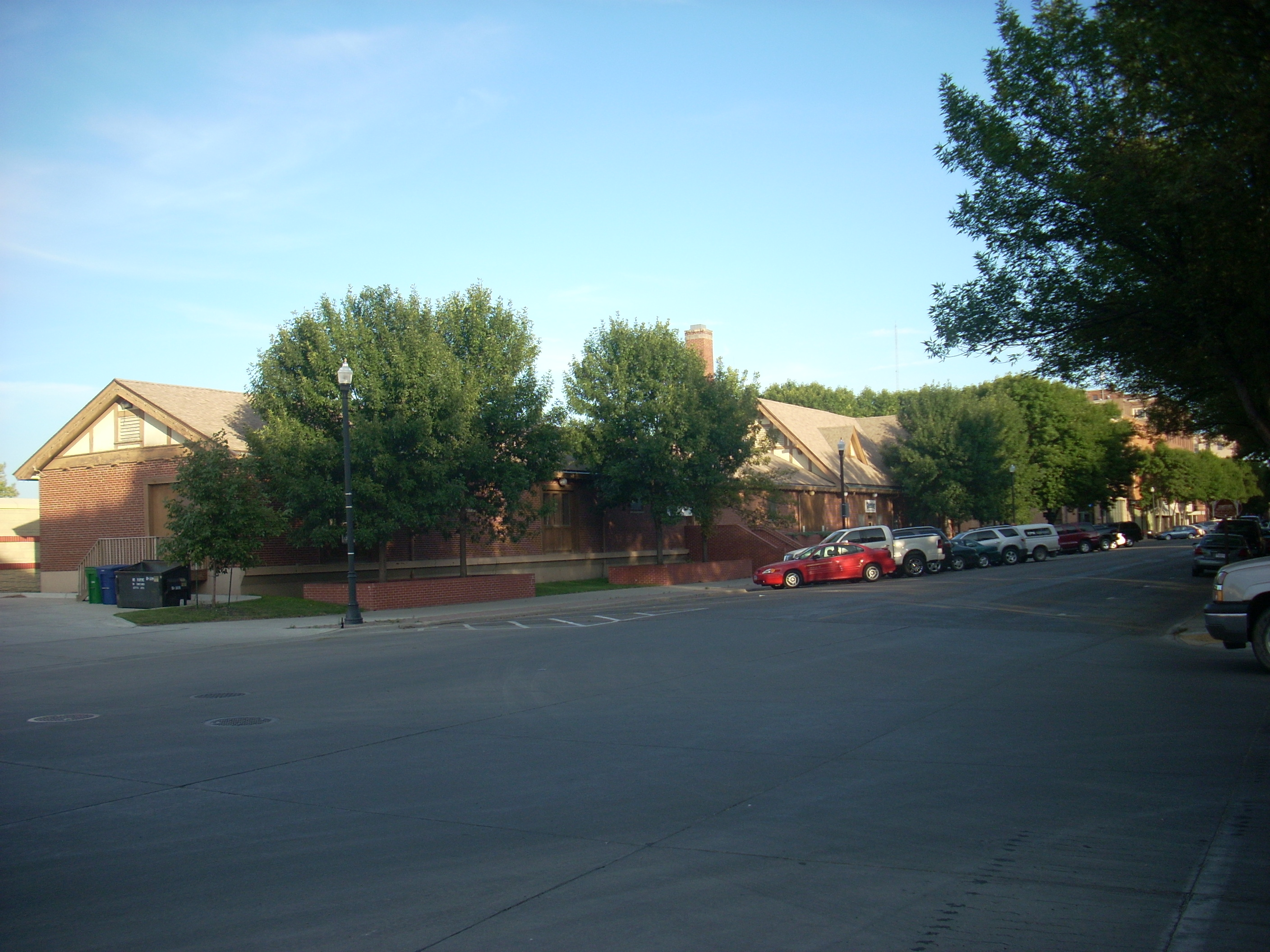
- Depot in 2009

- Location within North Dakota Location within the United States
- Location: 202 N. 3rd St., Grand Forks, North Dakota
- Coordinates: 47°55′37″N 97°1′58″W
- Area: less than 1 acre (0.40 ha)
- Built: 1929
- Architectural style: Tudor Revival
- MPS: Downtown Grand Forks MRA
- NRHP reference No.: 82001333
- Added to NRHP: October 26, 1982

Grand Forks station is a property in Grand Forks, North Dakota, United States, that was listed on the National Register of Historic Places in 1982 as the Northern Pacific Depot and Freight House. It was used both as a passenger station and a freight warehouse/depot by the Northern Pacific Railway.

The station was built in 1929 and includes Tudor Revival architecture. The listing was for an area of less than one acre with just one contributing building.

The listing is described in its North Dakota Cultural Resources Survey document. It is one of two "outstanding" buildings, both one story, that "represent the Tudor Revival", within the Downtown Grand Forks area whose historic resources were surveyed in 1981; the Lyons Garage is the other. Both are "done in polychrome brick of yellow and red".

== See also ==
- Great Northern Freight Warehouse and Depot, also NRHP-listed in Grand Forks

Preceding station	Northern Pacific Railway	Following station
Bolack toward Winnipeg	Winnipeg – St. Paul	East Grand Forks toward St. Paul
