= Dakota Block (Grand Forks, North Dakota) =

Building in North Dakota, USA

- U.S. National Register of Historic Places
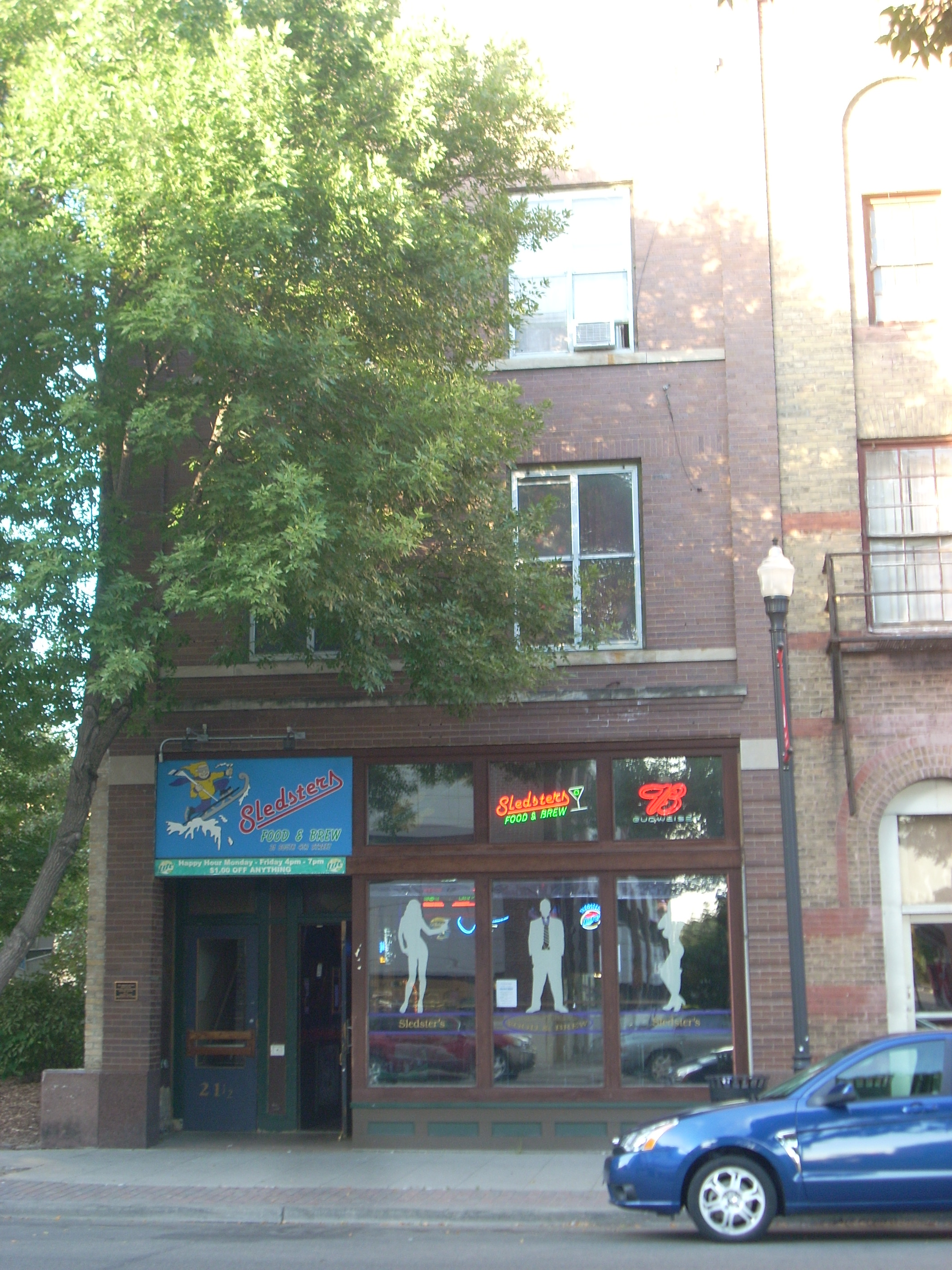

- Location within North Dakota Location within the United States
- Location: 21 S. 4th St., Grand Forks, North Dakota
- Coordinates: 47°55′26″N 97°1′48″W
- Area: less than one acre
- Built: 1916
- Architectural style: Early Commercial, Vernacular
- MPS: Downtown Grand Forks MRA
- NRHP reference No.: 82001320
- Added to NRHP: October 26, 1982

The Dakota Block is a three-story commercial vernacular style building built in 1916. It is within the Downtown Historic District in Grand Forks, North Dakota.

The principal facade of the Dakota Block consists of Hebron brick laid in a running bond. It features a single recessed bay delineated by corbelled brick and a stone cornice. The first floor has rusticated corner piers supporting pilaster strips which extend to the top of the building. Topping the front is a stone coping with a raised central parapet holding a name block inscribed "Dakota Block". The rear and sides of the building are constructed of common brick and are devoid of embellishment, save for a cast iron fire escape.
