= Grand Forks freight station =

- Great Northern Freight Warehouse and Depot
- U.S. National Register of Historic Places
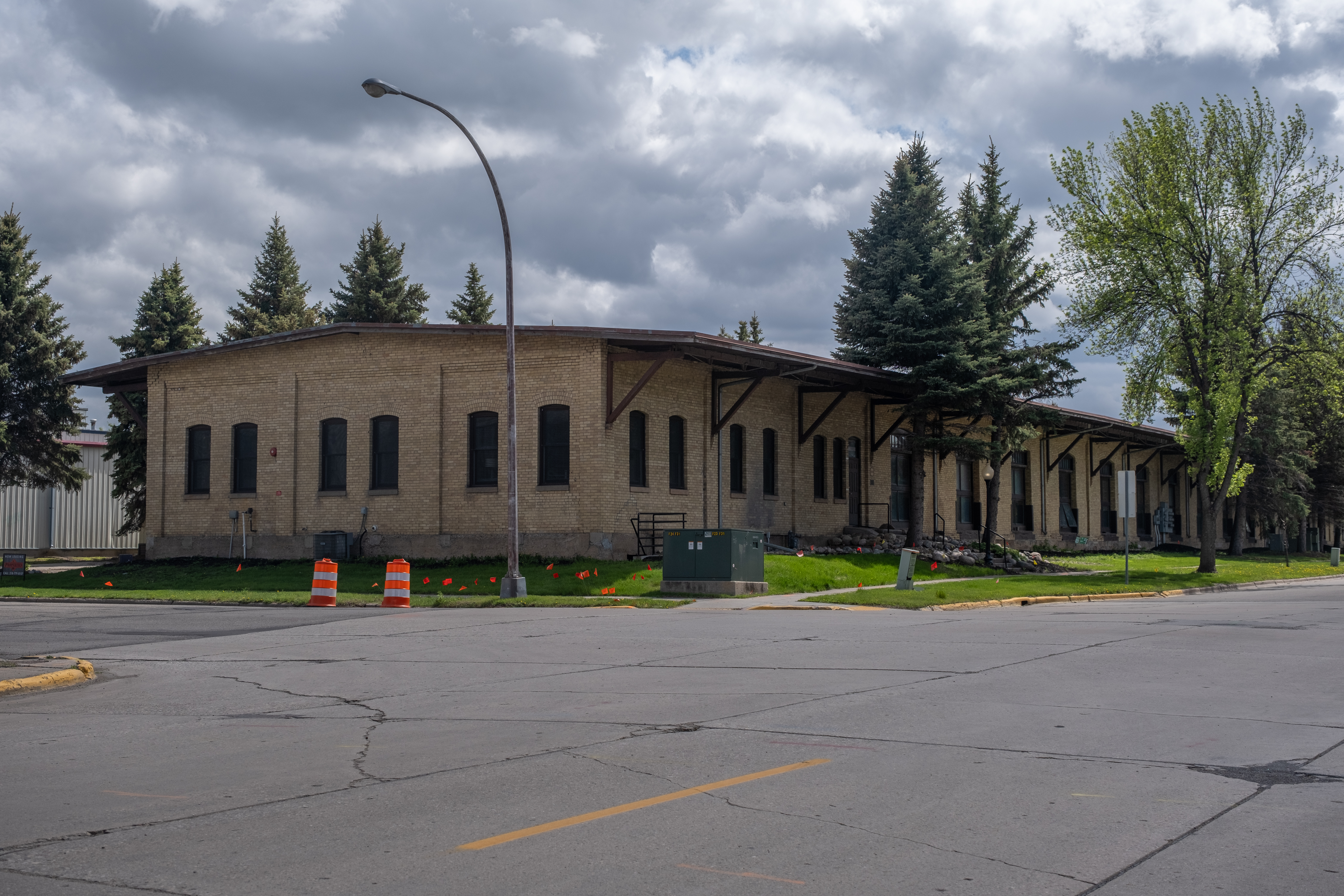

- Location within North Dakota Location within the United States
- Location: 899 Second Ave. N., Grand Forks, North Dakota
- Coordinates: 47°55′19.2″N 97°2′17.5″W
- Area: less than 1 acre (0.40 ha)
- Built: 1904
- Architect: Great Northern Railway
- NRHP reference No.: 89002031
- Added to NRHP: January 29, 1990

Grand Forks freight station is a former freight warehouse in Grand Forks, North Dakota, United States, built for the Great Northern Railway in 1904, during the Second Dakota Boom.

It was listed on the National Register of Historic Places (NRHP) in 1990 as the Great Northern Freight Warehouse and Depot, at which time it was being renovated into rental apartments.

== See also ==
- Northern Pacific Depot and Freight House, also NRHP-listed in Grand Forks
