= St. John's Block Commercial Exchange =

- U.S. National Register of Historic Places
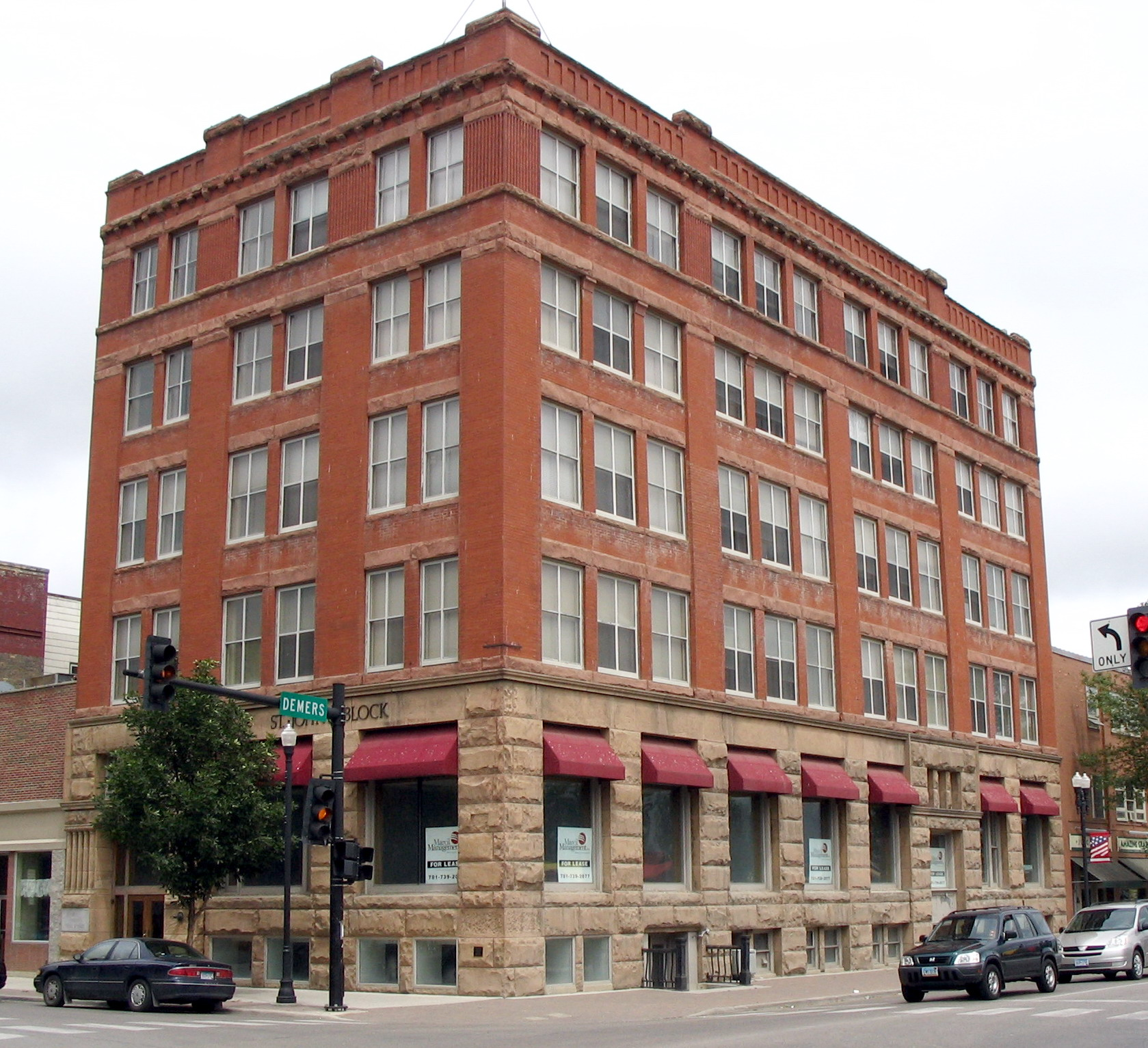
- Building, in 2006

- Location within North Dakota Location within the United States
- Location: 2 N. 3rd St., Grand Forks, North Dakota
- Coordinates: 47°55′32″N 97°1′49″W
- Area: less than 1 acre (0.40 ha)
- Built: 1890-1891
- Architectural style: Romanesque
- MPS: Downtown Grand Forks MRA
- NRHP reference No.: 82001338
- Added to NRHP: October 26, 1982

St. John's Block Commercial Exchange is a Richardsonian Romanesque building in Grand Forks, North Dakota, United States. It is a five-story brick and ashlar building, built during 1890–1891. It is smaller than one acre. It was listed on the National Register of Historic Places (NRHP) in 1982.

It was included in a 1981 study of Downtown Grand Forks historical resources that led to a large number of NRHP listings.
