= House at 1648 Riverside Drive =

Historic house in North Dakota, United States

Coordinates: 47°56′05″N 97°2′19″W

- Formerly listed on the U.S. National Register of Historic Places
- Location within North Dakota Location within the United States
- Location: 1648 Riverside Dr., Grand Forks, North Dakota
- Area: 1 acre (0.40 ha)
- Built: 1883
- Architectural style: Queen Anne
- NRHP reference No.: 94001074

Significant dates
- Added to NRHP: September 2, 1994
- Removed from NRHP: October 12, 2023

The House at 1648 Riverside Drive, also known as the Graber Residence and as 1648 Viets Avenue, was a 1 acre (0.40 ha) property consisting of two buildings in Grand Forks, North Dakota, that was listed on the National Register of Historic Places in 1994 and delisted in 2023.

It included Queen Anne style architecture.

The house was lost in the 1997 Red River flood.
