= R.S. Blome Granitoid Pavement in Grand Forks =

- R. S. Blome Granitoid Pavement in Grand Forks
- U.S. National Register of Historic Places
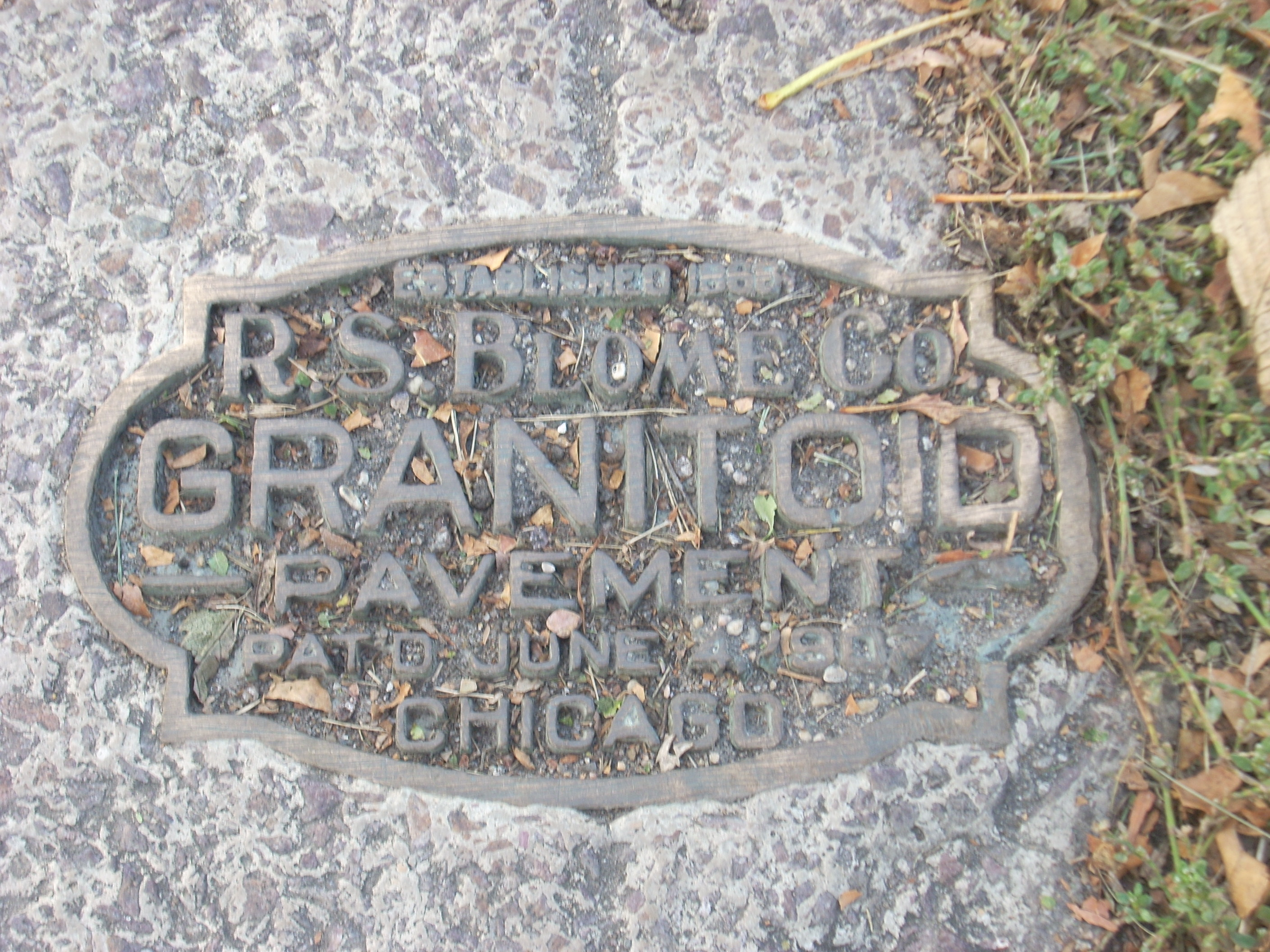

- Location within North Dakota Location within the United States
- Location: Roughly, Lewis Blvd. S of Conklin Ave. and area around jcts. of Walnut St. and 3rd Ave. and Minnesota Ave. and 5th St., Grand Forks, North Dakota
- Coordinates: 47°55′27″N 97°1′58″W
- Area: 55 acres (22 ha) (original)
- Built: 1910-1911
- Architect: Blome, R.S., Co. of Chicago
- NRHP reference No.: 91001583 and 10000605
- Added to NRHP: November 5, 1991 (original); August 30, 2010 (decrease) Grand Forks, 10000605,

R.S. Blome Granitoid Pavement is a historic road surface, as well as the associated cut sandstone curbs in a few sections, found in three of the oldest residential sections of Grand Forks, North Dakota. It is a Portland cement–aggregate combination that was intended to bridge the gap between the needs of Horse-drawn vehicles, which required sure footing, and automobiles, which needed a hard, resilient surface, in the earliest part of the 20th century.

R.S. Blome Granitoid was made from a mixture of Portland cement and angular granite chips along with other stone and sand, laid down over an appropriately arched prepared road bed followed by a six-inch layer of loose gravel (macadam). It was laid in five-foot sections which were sealed at the joints with an asphalt and rubber mix to allow for expansion. Another intended benefit of laying the pavement in these sections was that it allowed for removal of only necessary portions for utility work. However it would appear that this intention was ignored as indicated by the presence of utility cuts and mismatched concrete and asphalt patching in the Grand Forks examples.

Over these sections was laid a two-inch finish layer of Portland cement and carefully screened angular granite chips measuring between 1/8 and 3/8 of an inch. Angular chips of granite were specified over rounded river gravel to ensure a firm bond and prohibit the dislodging of gravel common to concrete. As the surface dried it was brushed and scored to resemble cut stone, providing a good non-slip surface for horses. Though the Blome Company patent specified a gridded pattern of scoring, the Grand Forks pavement exhibits a running bond pattern.

Also surviving are a number of bronze name plates embedded into the paving surface which read "Established 1888. GRANITOID. R.S. Blome. Chicago. 1907."

This pavement type was selected after a lively discussion by city residents as a solution to the problem of ankle-deep mud which was an annual result of the spring thaw and rains. The residents determined to have a quality pavement that would last long "after it was paid for". Their choice has been validated as the Granitoid is still quite serviceable and well suited to modern automobile traffic after nearly a century of use.

Out of several extant locations where Blome Granitoid has been found, such as Duluth, Minnesota, Calumet, Michigan and Spokane and Seattle, Washington, there are several characteristics which make the Grand Forks sections particularly significant. There is more surviving Granitoid and the associated brass name plates in Grand Forks, encompassing a number of streets in three distinct neighborhoods, than in any of the other locations. Another important difference is the aforementioned use of the running bond pattern in the scoring, which is unique among all of the remaining examples. It suggests a desire among the residents for an aesthetic, as well as functional, pavement.

A 55-acre (22 ha) area was listed on the National Register in 1991. However, the listing was modified in 2010 to decrease the listed area.

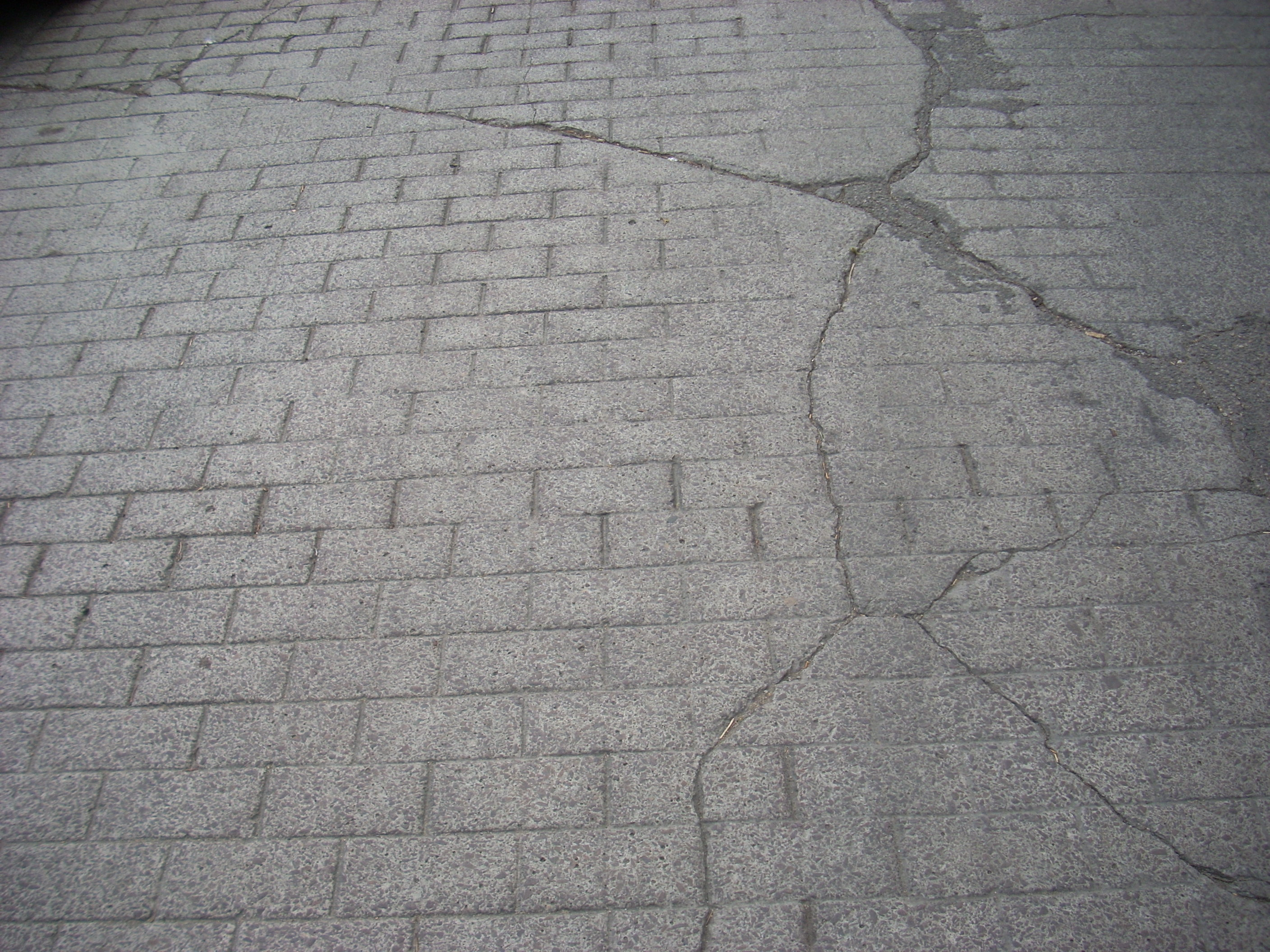
A section of R.S. Blome Granitoid pavement located on Chestnut St, Grand Forks, North Dakota.
