= Sykes =

"Sykes" is a surname of Anglo-Saxon English origins, which generally has topographical roots as it’s original linguistic origin. The name derives from the Old Norse word "sík" or "síkja", meaning a small stream, marshy hollow, or gully. It eventually was used to describe an individual who resided near such a topological feature. In time, this would evolve into "syke" or "sykes" in Middle English. As a surname, it began showing up in English records as early as the 13th century. It is relatively more common in the north of England, reflecting the Norse linguistic influence in that region.

The surname Sykes is also relatively common among African Americans, which often reflects the legacy of slavery in both the Americas and the rest of the world. Enslaved people were frequently given the surnames of the families who enslaved them, so many African American Sykes families can trace their surnames to a region of the American Deep South.

Sykes may refer to:

== People ==
- Sir Alan Sykes, 1st Baronet, businessman and British politician
- Annette Sykes, New Zealand human rights lawyer and Māori activist
- Bob Sykes (American football), American football player
- Bob Sykes (baseball), American baseball pitcher
- Bob Sykes (ice hockey), Canadian ice hockey player
- Bobbi Sykes, Australian author and land rights activist
- Bryan Sykes, British academic and geneticist
- Christopher Sykes (author), British author
- Christopher Sykes (politician), British politician
- Diane S. Sykes, judge on the United States Court of Appeals
- Edmund Sykes, Catholic martyr
- Emilia Sykes, American politician
- Eric Sykes, comedic writer and actor
- Eric A. Sykes, developer of the Fairbairn-Sykes fighting knife
- Ernest Sykes (VC), recipient of the Victoria Cross
- Ernest Ruthven Sykes (1867–1954), malacologist from Great Britain
- Eugene O. Sykes (1876–1945), justice on the Mississippi Supreme Court
- Frederick Henry Sykes (1863–1917), Canadian-American educator and college president
- Sir Frederick Hugh Sykes, British military officer and politician
- Gary Sykes, English professional boxer
- George Sykes, U.S. Army general
- Gresham Sykes (1922–2010), American sociologist and criminologist
- Homer Sykes, Canadian-born British photographer
- Congressman James Sykes (Continental Congress), lawyer and American politician
- Governor James Sykes (governor), physician and American politician
- John Sykes (1959–2024), English singer and guitarist
- John Sykes (American football) (1949–2019), American football player
- John Sykes (composer) (1909–1962), English composer and music teacher, born in India
- John Sykes (politician), British politician
- John H. Sykes Tampa Bay area businessman and founder of Sykes inc.
- Keifer Sykes (born 1993), American basketball player
- Lucy Sykes (born 1969), British-American socialite
- Lynn Sykes (born 1937), American seismologist
- Sir Mark Sykes, British politician and diplomatic advisor
- Mark Sykes (footballer) (born 1997) Irish footballer
- Melanie Sykes (born 1970), English television and radio presenter, and model
- Nathan Sykes (born 1993), member of boy band The Wanted
- Norman Sykes (1936–2009), English footballer
- Oliver Sykes, frontman of Bring Me the Horizon
- Paul Sykes (boxer) (1946–2007), English heavyweight boxer of the 1970s and 1980s
- Paul Sykes (businessman) (born 1943), English Eurosceptic businessman, and political donor
- Paul Sykes (rugby league) (born 1981), rugby league footballer of the 1990s, 2000s and 2010s
- Paul Sykes (singer), American folksinger of the 1960s
- Sir Percy Sykes, British soldier, geographer and travel writer
- Peter Sykes (director) (1939–2006), Australian/British film director
- Peter Sykes (chemist) (1923–2003), British chemist
- Plum Sykes (born 1969) British fashion journalist and novelist
- Sir Richard Sykes (biochemist), businessman and university rector
- Sir Richard Sykes (diplomat), diplomat assassinated in 1979
- Richard Sykes (rugby union), Rugby player and Dakota landowner
- Rod Sykes (1929–2025), Canadian politician from Alberta
- Ronald Sykes (1899–1977), British aviator
- Stephen Sykes (1939–2014), ecclesiologist
- Tatton Sykes (disambiguation)
- Thomas Sykes (Mississippi politician), African-American legislator in Mississippi during Reconstruction
- Thomas A. Sykes, African-American legislator in North Carolina and Tennessee during Reconstruction
- Thomas Hardcastle Sykes, businessman
- Timothy Sykes (born 1981), penny stock trader
- Tom Sykes, British motorcycle racer
- Wanda Sykes, comedian and actress
- William Sykes (businessman) (1852–1910), English businessman
- Colonel William Henry Sykes, military officer, politician, and ornithologist
- William Robert Sykes, British railway signal engineer
- Sykes, South African singer-songwriter

== Companies ==
- Sykes Bleaching Company
- Sykes Enterprises, Incorporated, a family of global companies delivering business process outsourcing services

== Characters ==
- Bill Sykes, antagonist from the animated Disney film Oliver & Company
- Fredrick Sykes, one of the main antagonists of the 1993 action film The Fugitive
- Mr. Sykes, a character from the film Shark Tale, voiced by Martin Scorsese
- Sgt. Michael "Psycho" Sykes, the main character in the game Crysis Warhead, and a secondary character in Crysis
- Reverend Sykes, a character from Harper Lee's novel To Kill a Mockingbird
- Robert "Pliers" Sykes, character in the game Wing Commander IV

== Places ==
- Sykes, Lancashire, England
- Sykesville, Maryland, USA
- Forward Operating Base Sykes, a U.S. military base in Iraq
- Sykes Camp, a campground in California

== Other ==
- 4438 Sykes, an asteroid
- Sykes (dog), a dog actor from Clifton, Oxfordshire, England
- Sykes (TV series), a British sitcom that aired on BBC 1 from 1972 to 1979
- Sykes baronets, four separate baronetcies of Great Britain or the United Kingdom

== See also ==
- Sikes (disambiguation)
- Syke (disambiguation)
