= Ella Sykes =

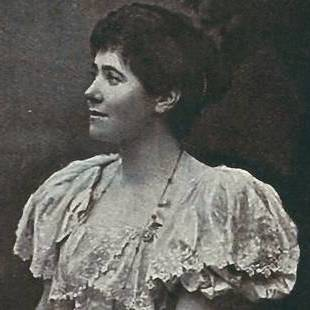
- Born: 11 November 1863; Stoke
- Died: 23 March 1939 (aged 75); London
- Occupations: Writer, companion, photographer
- Known for: travel writing

Ella Sykes or Ella Constance Sykes (11 November 1863 – 23 March 1939) was a traveller and writer from the United Kingdom.

== Life ==
Sykes was born in Stoke near Plymouth in 1863. Her parents were Army chaplain Rev. William Sykes (born 1829) and his wife Mary, daughter of Captain Anthony Oliver Molesworth, of the Royal Artillery, descended from Robert Molesworth, 1st Viscount Molesworth. Her father was honorary chaplain to Queen Victoria. Her sister Ethel Sykes was also a writer, and their only brother Percy Sykes became a brigadier, diplomat and writer. Her father William was the second son of Richard Sykes, of Edgeley House, Stockport, owner of the Sykes Bleaching Company; Percy Sykes was thus the nephew of Richard Sykes, the rugby player who founded towns in America, and cousin of Sir Alan Sykes, 1st Baronet who was MP for Knutsford, Cheshire.

She was educated at Plymouth High School and then the boarding school Royal School for Daughters of Officers of the Army in Bath. She then joined the recently opened Oxford college for women Lady Margaret Hall in 1881 and left in 1883. Her sister, who had a nearly identical education, left in 1884.

She had enough money that she did not need to work. In 1894 her brother Percy was tasked with establishing consulates in Kerman and Baluchistan and he invited her to come along. They spent two years travelling. When she returned she used her experiences to write Through Persia on a Side-Saddle, which was published in 1898.

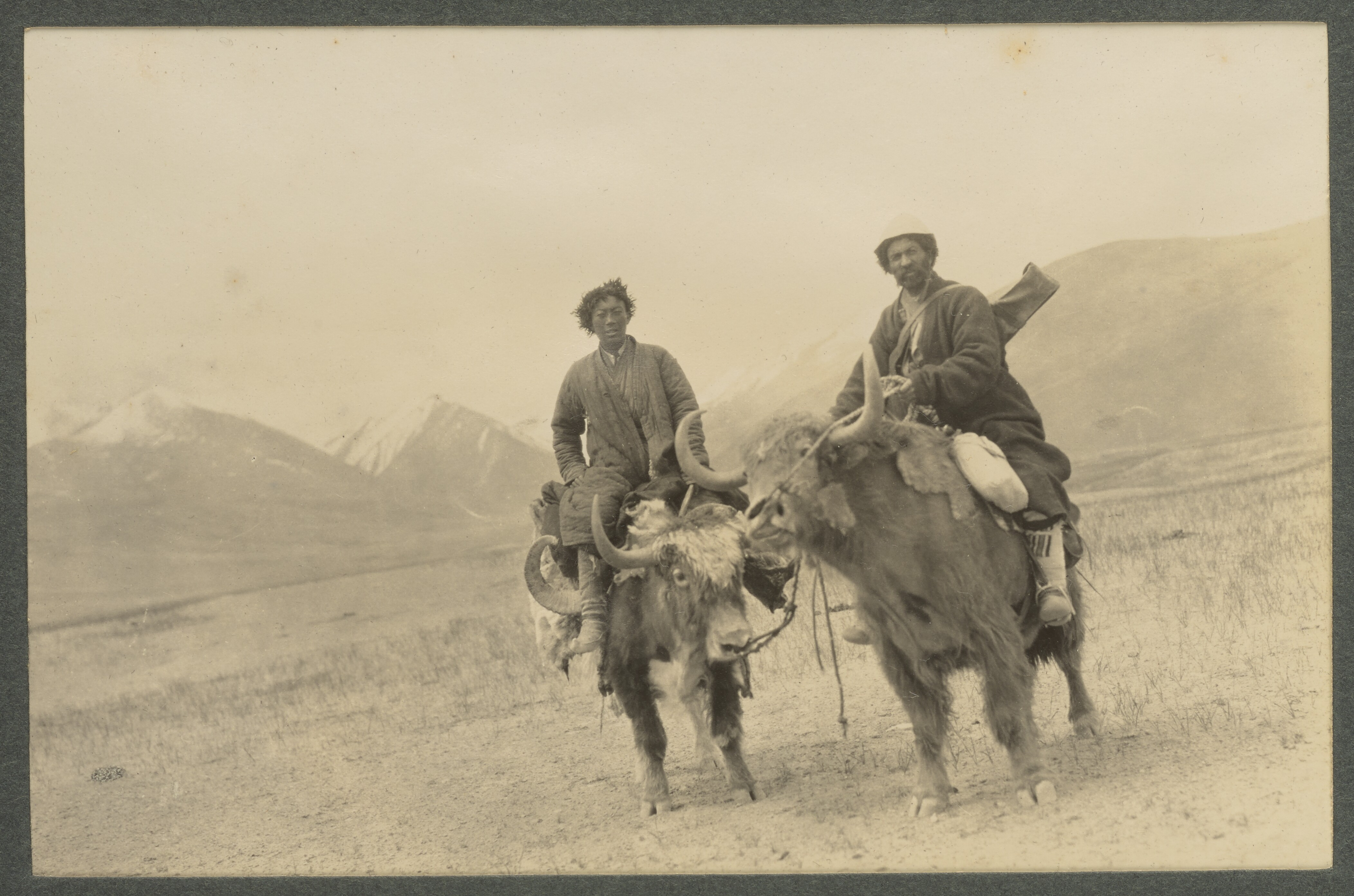
Two men on yaks - an illustration from her and her brother's book Through Deserts and Oases of Central Asia

She also took photographs whilst on the journey, and an album of photographs was published but these were all taken by her brother.

In 1915 she set off again to accompany her brother. He had been asked to become the temporary consul replacing Sir George Macartney in Kashgar whilst he and Catherine Macartney took a vacation. They had to journey to Tashkent and then proceed by pony over passes 12,000 feet above sea level to find Kashgar in Turkestan. The journey took them over a month. Whilst they were there they travelled further in some places this was exploration. She was the first British woman to pass through the "Katta Dawan" pass that was 13,000 feet high. Their journey home also took a month and these journeys were recorded in photographs. In 1920 she and her brother Percy published Through Deserts and Oases of Central Asia.

Sykes died in her home in London in 1939.
