= Thomas Sykes =

Thomas Sykes may refer to:

- Thomas Sykes (academic) (died 1705), English academic
- Thomas Sykes (Mississippi politician) (fl. 1870s), American politician in Mississippi
- Thomas A. Sykes (c. 1835–?), American politician in North Carolina and Tennessee
- Thomas Hardcastle Sykes, English bleacher and businessman
