= Ethel Sykes =

British teacher and writer (1864–1945)

- Born: 30 October 1864; Stoke
- Died: 8 March 1945 (aged 80); Hurstpierpoint

Ethel Sykes or Ethel Rosalie Sykes (30 October 1864 – 8 March 1945) was a British teacher and writer. She managed the thousands of women who worked at Lloyds Bank during the first world war. She was retained when many of them were laid off as the soldiers returned.

== Life ==
Sykes was born in Stoke. Her parents were Army chaplain Rev. William Sykes (born 1829) and his wife Mary, daughter of Captain Anthony Oliver Molesworth, of the Royal Artillery, descended from Robert Molesworth, 1st Viscount Molesworth. Her father was honorary chaplain to Queen Victoria. Her sister Ella Sykes was a traveller and writer, and their only brother Percy Sykes became a brigadier, diplomat and writer. Her father, William was the second son of Richard Sykes, of Edgeley House, Stockport, owner of the Sykes Bleaching Company; Percy Sykes was thus the nephew of Richard Sykes the rugby player who founded towns in America, and cousin of Sir Alan Sykes, 1st Baronet who was MP for Knutsford, Cheshire.

She was educated at Plymouth High School and then the boarding school Royal School for Daughters of Officers of the Army in Bath. She then joined the recently opened Oxford college for women Lady Margaret Hall in 1881 and left in 1884. Her sister who had a nearly identical education left in 1883.

She had enough money that she did not need to work, but in 1910 she got a job teaching at the recently renamed Queen Mary College in Lahore. She would be there until 1912.

In 1915 she published Readings from Indian History for Boys and Girls in two volumes. In 1917 she was appointed by Lloyds Bank to be their "supervisor of women". This was a time of change as the pre-war small number of women employees was swelled during the war as 3,300 women took on the jobs made available by men being recruited into the forces. At the end of the war the situation was reversed and women would no longer be recruited as clerks. By 1920 there was about 1,500 women employees and they were generally filing and typing. She did charity work at what was St Mary Abbots Hospital and she represented Lady Margaret Hall on the University Women's Club in London - where women could have a "gentleman's club".

Sykes died in a nursing home in Hurstpierpoint and she left a substantial legacy to the sisterhood at Oxford Mission Church in what is now Bangladesh.
