= Edgeley (disambiguation) =

Edgeley is an area of Stockport, in Greater Manchester, England. Edgeley may also refer to:

- Edgeley, North Dakota, in the United States
- Edgeley, Ontario, in Canada
- Edgeley, Saskatchewan, in Canada
