= Sikes =

== People ==
- Alfred C. Sikes (born 1939), American chairman of the Federal Communications Commission
- Bartholomew Sikes (died 1803), British excise officer, inventor of the standard hydrometer for alcohol proof
- Bob Sikes (1906–1994), American politician from Florida
- Cynthia Sikes (born 1954), American actress
- Dan Sikes (1929–1987), American golfer
- David Sikes, American politician
- Elisabeth Sikes, American geoscientist
- Grant Sikes, American internet personality
- James Sikes, driver of a runaway Toyota Prius
- Jules V. Sikes (1904–1964), American athlete and coach
- Simon Sikes, American racing driver
- Stuart Sikes, American recording engineer
- Wirt Sikes (1836–1883), American journalist and writer

== Fictional people ==
- Bill Sikes, from the novel Oliver Twist by Charles Dickens

== Places in the United States ==
- Sikes, Louisiana
- Sikes Township, Mountrail County, North Dakota

== See also ==
- Sike (disambiguation)
- Sykes (disambiguation)
