= C. H. Sykes =

C. H. Sykes may refer to:

- Christopher Sykes (writer), British writer
- Charles Henry Sykes, American cartoonist
- Charles H. Sykes, American politician

== See also ==
- Sykes (disambiguation)
