= Dora's Dunking Doughnuts =

1933 film

- Directed by: Harry Edwards
- Written by: Ernest Pagano; Ewart Adamson
- Starring: Shirley Temple; Ethel Sykes; Andy Clyde
- Cinematography: Dwight Warren
- Music by: Alfonso Corelli
- Production company: Educational Pictures
- Release date: 1933
- Running time: 20 minutes
- Country: United States
- Language: English

Dora's Dunking Doughnuts is a 1933 American short subject directed by Harry Edwards and starring Shirley Temple, Ethel Sykes and Andy Clyde. Part of the "Andy Clyde Shorts" series, it was written by Ernest Pagano and Ewart Adamson.

== Plot ==
Teacher Andy is fixated on both Dora who runs a bakery and her doughnuts that he has every morning on his way to teach school. He proposes using the musical talent of his students to perform on a radio show to advertise the bakery. Once on the air bickering mothers of the students fight and brawl with the manager leading listeners to believe the show is a comedy.

== Cast ==
- Andy Clyde as Andy
- Ethel Sykes as Dora
- Shirley Temple as Shirley
- Bud Jamison as radio station manager
- Fern Emmett as woman at radio station
- Florence Gill as singer on radio program
- The Meglin Kiddies Band
