= George Sykes (disambiguation) =

George Sykes (1822–1880) was an American Civil War major general in the Union Army.

George Sykes may also refer to:

- George Sykes (footballer) (born 1994), English/Scottish footballer
- George Sykes (New Hampshire politician) (born 1951), member of the New Hampshire House of Representatives
- George Sykes (New Jersey politician) (1802–1880), U.S. Representative from New Jersey
- George Sykes (New Zealand politician) (1867–1957), New Zealand Member of Parliament
- George Sykes (Wisconsin politician) (1816–1881), member of the Wisconsin State Assembly

== See also ==
- Sykes (disambiguation)
