= List of tallest buildings in Vaughan =

Skyline of Vaughan
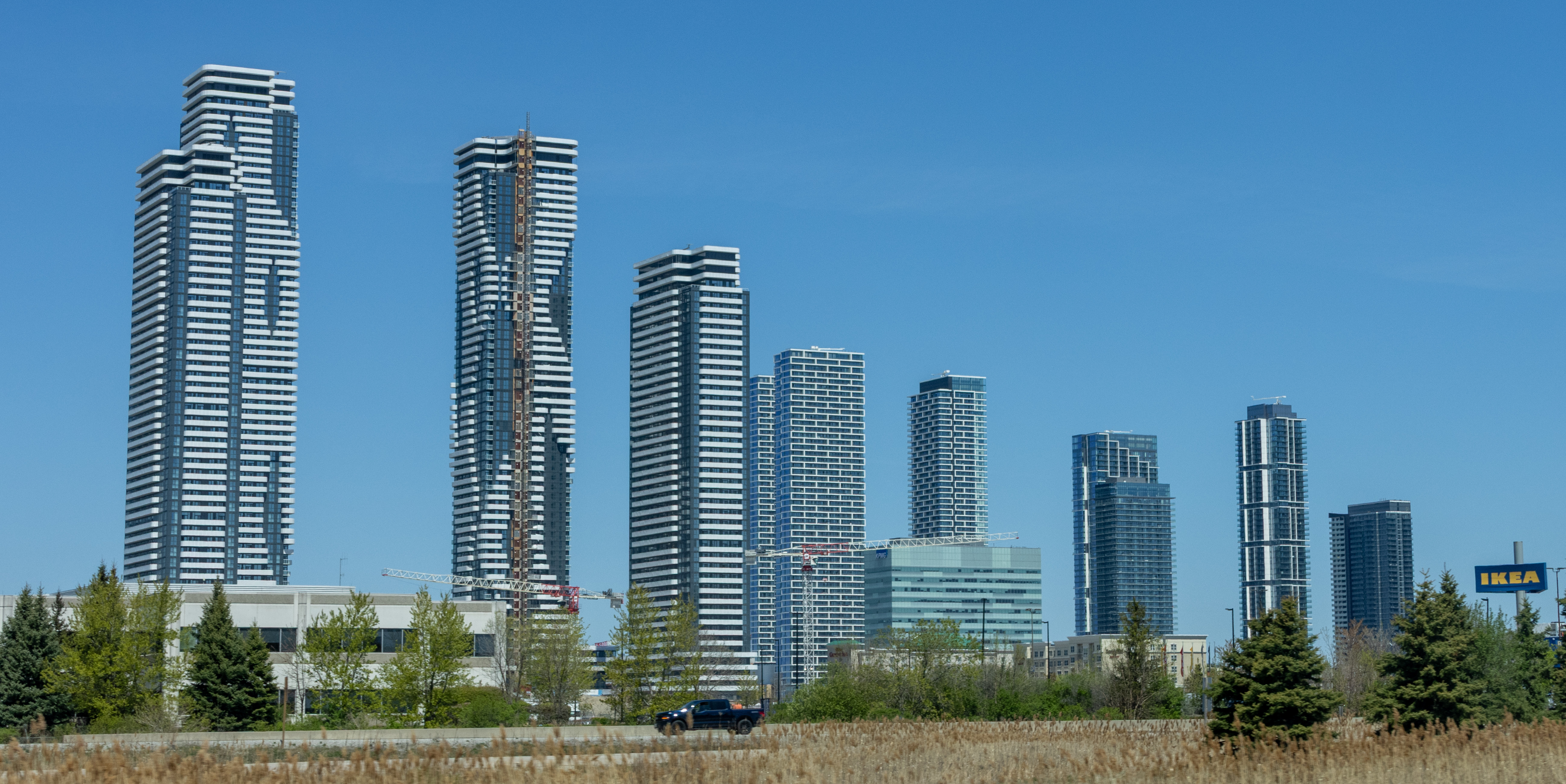
- Residential skyscrapers of Vaughan Metropolitan Centre from Highway 407 in 2025
- Tallest building: CG Tower (2024)
- Tallest building height: 189.8 m (623 ft)
- First 150 m+ building: Transit City Condominiums (2021) (Note: Three skyscrapers taller than 150 m (492 ft) in Transit City were completed in 2021.)

Number of tall buildings (2026)
- Taller than 100 m (328 ft): 19
- Taller than 150 m (492 ft): 8

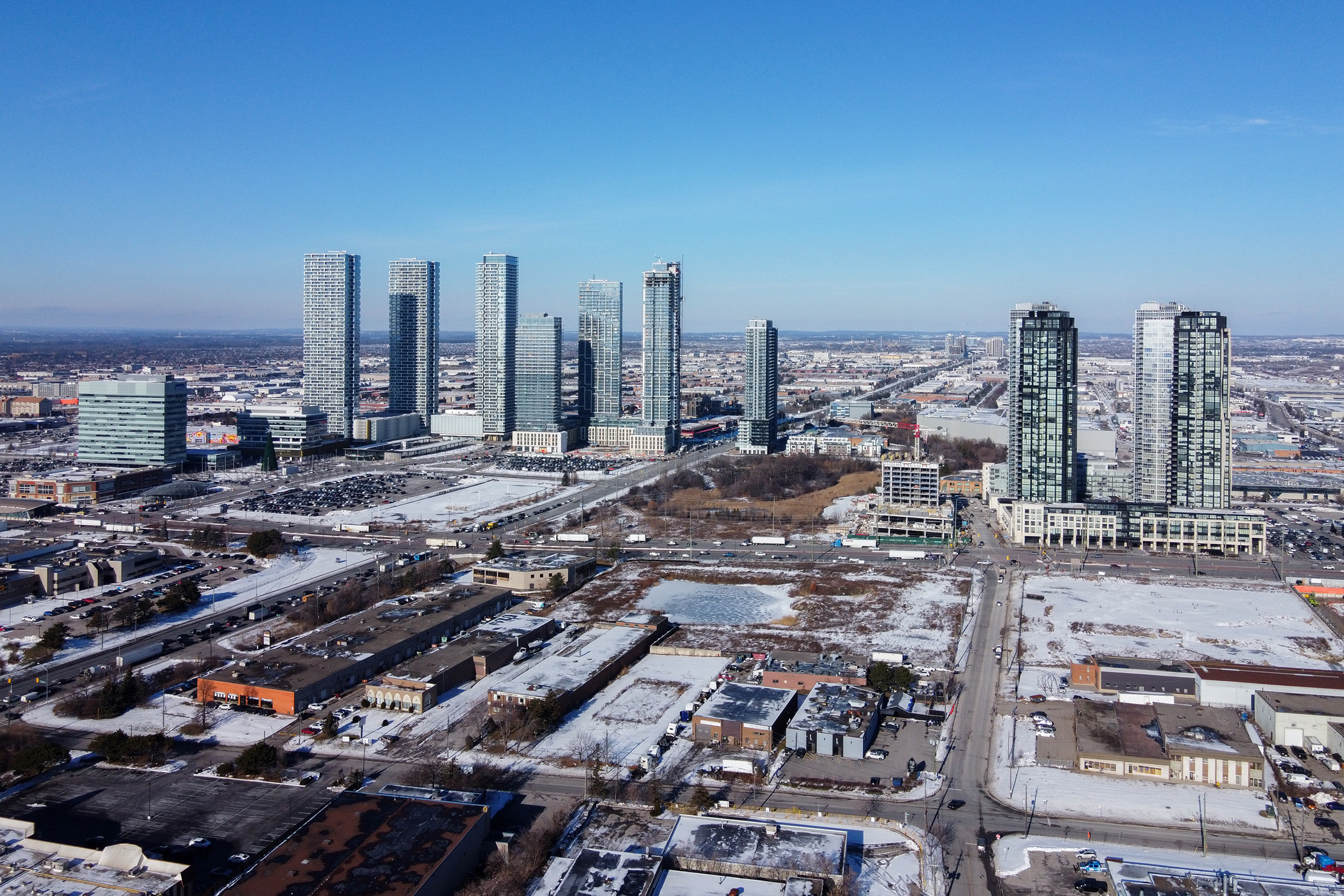
Aerial view of Vaughan Metropolitan Centre in 2022

Vaughan is a city in the Canadian province of Ontario. Part of the Greater Toronto Area (GTA), Vaughan has seen a surge in high-rise construction in the early 21st century, almost all of which is residential. The city is home to 19 buildings taller than 100 m (328 ft) as of 2026. Eight of them exceed 150 m (492 ft) in height, the second most in Ontario after Toronto. Alongside Mississauga, Vaughan has one of the largest collections of tall buildings in the GTA outside of Toronto. The tallest building in Vaughan is the 190 m (623 ft), 59-storey CG Tower.

The earliest high-rises in Vaughan appeared in the 1980s. Vaughan was incorporated into a city in 1991, and plans emerged for a new business and commercial centre at the intersection of Highway 7 and Jane Street. The Vaughan Corporate Centre, as the district was then branded, was approved in 1998 to become a focal point for business activity and major commercial development. The area was renamed Vaughan Metropolitan Centre (VMC) in 2009. In the 2010s, new buildings in Vaughan started to reach over 100 m (328 ft) in height. This accelerated when Vaughan Metropolitan Centre station, which opened in 2017 when the western branch of the Toronto subway's Line 1 Yonge-University was extended to the area, improved the new city centre's connectivity to Toronto.

The height of new developments increased substantially in the 2020s, with multiple towers surpassing 150 m (492 ft) in height. Major projects include the Transit City and Festival Condos developments, which consist of five and three towers respectively. CG Tower, completed in 2024 as Vaughan's tallest building, is noted for its shape, resembling stacked, cantilevered boxes, as well as the brick-embedded precast panels on its façade. The 3131 Highway 7 plan, one of several proposed schemes for Vaughan, includes skyscrapers up to 74 storeys tall.

Vaughan's tallest buildings are mainly located in Vaughan Metropolitan Centre, located near the city's southern border with Toronto. There are a smaller number of high-rises around the Promenade shopping centre, east of VMC. The tallest building there is Promenade Park Tower II.

== History ==
Number of buildings by height in Vaughan by the end of each year, based on the information in this article. Click on the legend to toggle a specific height on or off. View chart definition.

== Map of tallest buildings ==
The map below shows the location of buildings taller than 100 m (328 ft) in the Vaughan Metropolitan Centre. Each marker is numbered by the building's height rank, and colored by the decade of its completion. There is one building in Vaughan exceeding 100 m (328 ft) in height that is located outside of the map, Promenade Park Towers II.

Buildings taller than 100 m (328 ft) in Vaughan. An asterisk (*) next to the building's name indicates it is located outside the map.
- 2010s
- 2020s
1 CG Tower
2 Festival Tower A
3 Transit City Condominiums 3
4 Festival Tower C
5 Transit City Condominiums 2
6 Transit City Condominiums 1
7 TC5
8 Festival Tower B
9 TC4
10 Festival Tower D
11 Nord East
12 Nord West
13 The Millway at Transit City
14 Expo 1
15 Expo 2
16 The Met
17 Centro Square East
18 Promenade Park Towers II*
19 Centro Square West

== Tallest buildings ==
This list ranks completed buildings in Vaughan that stand at least 100 m (328 ft) tall as of 2026, based on standard height measurement. This includes spires and architectural details but does not include antenna masts. The “Year” column indicates the year of completion. Buildings tied in height are sorted by year of completion with earlier buildings ranked first, and then alphabetically.

Was the tallest building in Vaughan upon completion

Rank	Name	Image	Location	Height m (ft)	Floors	Year	Purpose	Notes
1	CG Tower		43°47′44″N 79°31′19″W	189.8 (623)	59	2024	Residential	Tallest building in Vaughan. Tallest building in Ontario outside of Toronto and Mississauga. Tallest building completed in Vaughan in the 2020s.
2	Festival Tower A		43°47′31″N 79°31′58″W	187.6 (615)	59	2025	Residential	Also known as Festival Condominiums I.
3	Transit City Condominiums 3		43°47′52″N 79°31′41″W	179.8 (590)	57	2021	Residential	Tallest building in Vaughan from 2021 to 2024.
4	Festival Tower C		43°47′32″N 79°31′53″W	177.6 (583)	55	2024	Residential	Also known as Festival Condominiums III.
5	Transit City Condominiums 2		43°47′48″N 79°31′45″W	177 (581)	56	2021	Residential	Part of the Transit City development.
6	Transit City Condominiums 1		43°47′51″N 79°31′45″W	176.5 (579)	56	2021	Residential	Part of the Transit City development.
7	TC5		43°47′51″N 79°31′33″W	174.3 (572)	50	2023	Residential	Part of the Transit City development.
8	Festival Tower B		43°47′29″N 79°31′58″W	150.5 (494)	48	2024	Residential	Also known as Festival Condominiums II.
9	TC4		43°47′52″N 79°31′36″W	148.1 (486)	45	2023	Residential	Part of the Transit City development.
10	Festival Tower D		43°47′30″N 79°31′52″W	134.5 (441)	41	2024	Residential	Also known as Festival Condominiums IV.
11	Nord East		43°47′48″N 79°31′14″W	123.5 (405)	38	2020	Residential	Tallest building in Vaughan briefly from 2020 to 2021 alongside Nord West.
12	Nord West		43°47′47″N 79°31′17″W	123.5 (405)	38	2020	Residential	Tallest building in Vaughan briefly from 2020 to 2021 alongside Nord East.
13	The Millway at Transit City		43°47′50″N 79°31′37″W	118.6 (389)	35	2023	Residential	
14	Expo 1		43°47′45″N 79°31′13″W	117.5 (385)	37	2015	Residential	Tallest building in Vaughan from 2015 to 2020. From 2016 to 2020, it shared this title with Expo 2. Tallest building completed in Vaughan in the 2010s alongside Expo 1.
15	Expo 2		43°47′44″N 79°31′16″W	117.5 (385)	37	2016	Residential	Tallest building in Vaughan from 2016 to 2020 alongside Expo 1. Tallest building completed in Vaughan in the 2010s alongside Expo 1.
16	The Met		43°47′53″N 79°31′30″W	113 (371)	35	2020	Residential	
17	Centro Square East	–	43°47′24″N 79°32′46″W	112 (367)	33	2017	Residential	
18	Promenade Park Towers II	–	43°48′18″N 79°27′08″W	105.2 (345)	35	2025	Residential	Tallest building in Vaughan outside VMC or the immediate area
19	Centro Square West	–	43°47′25″N 79°32′49″W	102 (335)	30	2017	Residential	

== Tallest under construction or approved ==
=== Under construction ===
The following table includes buildings under construction in Vaughan that are planned to be at least 100 m (328 ft) tall as of 2026, based on standard height measurement. The “Year” column indicates the expected year of completion. Buildings that are on hold are not included.

Name	Height m (ft)	Floors	Year	Purpose	Notes
Bravo I at Festival	138.4 (454)	40	2028	Residential	
Artwalk I	131 (430)	38	2026	Residential	
Vincent Condominiums I	129 (423)	37	2026	Residential	
SXSW Condominiums I	108.8 (357)	32	2026	Residential	

== Timeline of tallest buildings ==
Name	Image	Years as tallest	Height m (ft)	Floors	Notes
Expo 1		2015–2020	117.5 (385)	37	
Expo 2		2016–2020	117.5 (385)	37	
Nord East		2020–2021	123.5 (405)	38	
Nord West		2020–2021	123.5 (405)	38	
Transit City Condominiums 3		2021–2024	179.8 (590)	57	
CG Tower		2024–present	189.8 (623)	59	

== See also ==
- List of tallest buildings in Toronto
- List of tallest buildings in Markham
- List of tallest buildings in Mississauga
- List of tallest buildings in Canada
