= Bowdon, North Dakota =

- City
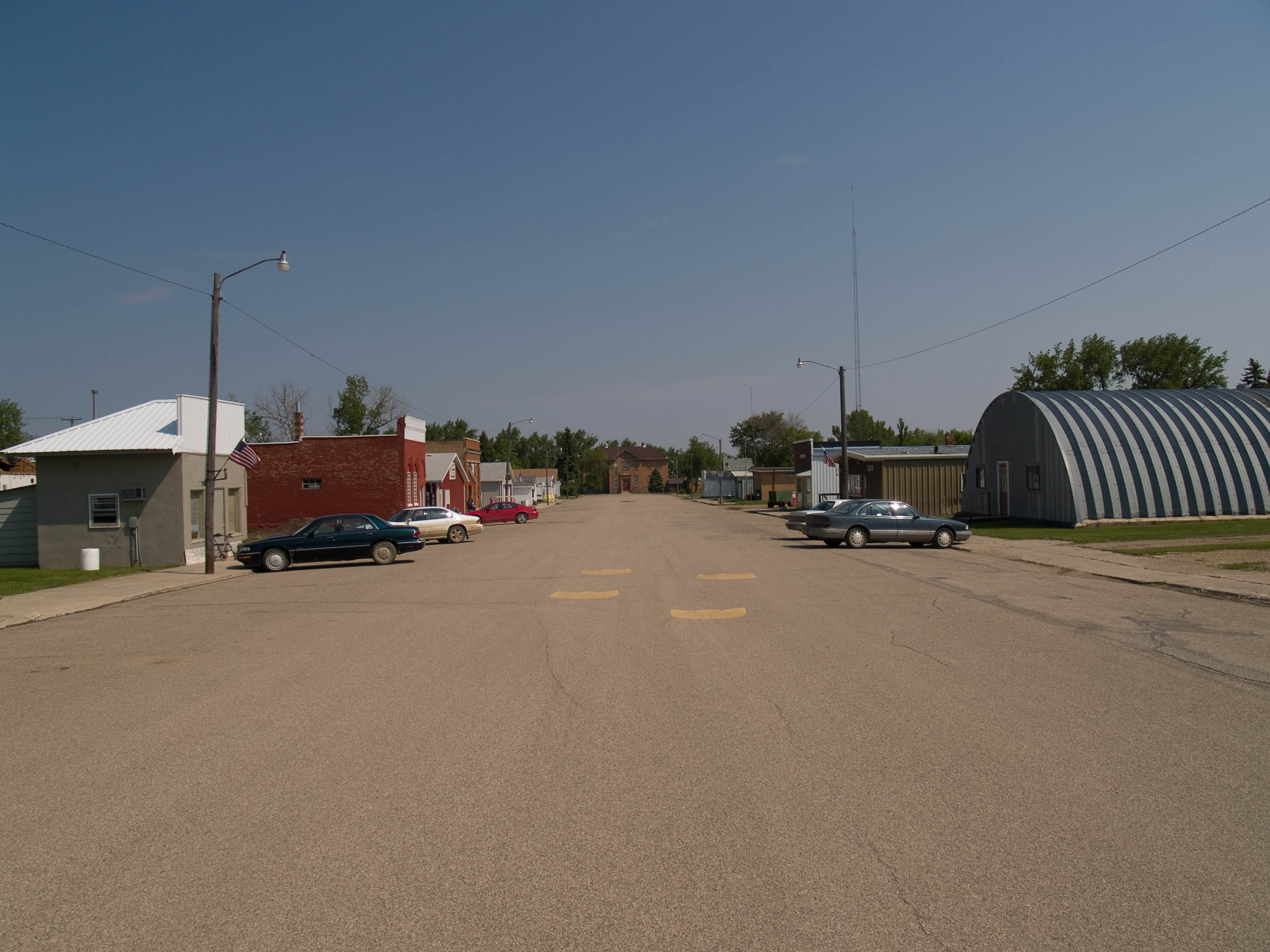
- Business district of Bowdon

- Logo
- Motto: "Come Experience Our Good Nature"
- Location of Bowdon, North Dakota
- Coordinates: 47°28′07″N 99°42′32″W
- Country: United States
- State: North Dakota
- County: Wells
- Founded: 1899

Government
  - Mayor: Hans Widicker

Area
  - Total: 0.25 sq mi (0.65 km^{2})
  - Land: 0.25 sq mi (0.65 km^{2})
  - Water: 0 sq mi (0.00 km^{2})
- Elevation: 1,811 ft (552 m)

Population (2020)
  - Total: 137
  - Estimate (2022): 137
  - Density: 545.3/sq mi (210.53/km^{2})
- Time zone: UTC-6 (Central (CST))
  - Summer (DST): UTC-5 (CDT)
- ZIP code: 58418
- Area code: 701
- FIPS code: 38-08580
- GNIS feature ID: 1035938

Bowdon is a city in Wells County, North Dakota, United States. The population was 137 at the 2020 census.

Bowdon was founded in 1899 by Richard Sykes, a landowner from England who named it after Bowdon, near Manchester where he lived.

== Geography ==
According to the United States Census Bureau, the city has a total area of 0.25 square miles (0.65 km^{2}), all land.

== Demographics ==
Historical population
Census	Pop.	Note	%±
1910	302		—
1920	306		1.3%
1930	303		−1.0%
1940	348		14.9%
1950	348		0.0%
1960	259		−25.6%
1970	229		−11.6%
1980	220		−3.9%
1990	196		−10.9%
2000	139		−29.1%
2010	131		−5.8%
2020	137		4.6%
2022 (est.)	137		0.0%
U.S. Decennial Census; 2020 Census

=== 2010 census ===
As of the census of 2010, there were 131 people, 77 households, and 37 families residing in the city. The population density was 524.0 inhabitants per square mile (202.3/km^{2}). There were 94 housing units at an average density of 376.0 per square mile (145.2/km^{2}). The racial makeup of the city was 99.2% White and 0.8% Native American. Hispanic or Latino of any race were 1.5% of the population.

There were 77 households, of which 6.5% had children under the age of 18 living with them, 40.3% were married couples living together, 6.5% had a female householder with no husband present, 1.3% had a male householder with no wife present, and 51.9% were non-families. 49.4% of all households were made up of individuals, and 29.9% had someone living alone who was 65 years of age or older. The average household size was 1.70 and the average family size was 2.41.

The median age in the city was 63.9 years. 7.6% of residents were under the age of 18; 0.1% were between the ages of 18 and 24; 11.4% were from 25 to 44; 32.2% were from 45 to 64; and 48.9% were 65 years of age or older. The gender makeup of the city was 43.5% male and 56.5% female.

=== 2000 census ===
As of the census of 2000, there were 139 people, 83 households, and 43 families residing in the city. The population density was 544.4 inhabitants per square mile (210.2/km^{2}). There were 104 housing units at an average density of 407.3 per square mile (157.3/km^{2}). The racial makeup of the city was 99.28% White and 0.72% African American.

There were 83 households, out of which 4.8% had children under the age of 18 living with them, 44.6% were married couples living together, 6.0% had a female householder with no husband present, and 47.0% were non-families. 45.8% of all households were made up of individuals, and 33.7% had someone living alone who was 65 years of age or older. The average household size was 1.67 and the average family size was 2.25.

In the city, the population was spread out, with 7.9% under the age of 18, 2.9% from 18 to 24, 16.5% from 25 to 44, 19.4% from 45 to 64, and 53.2% who were 65 years of age or older. The median age was 66 years. For every 100 females, there were 93.1 males. For every 100 females age 18 and over, there were 88.2 males.

The median income for a household in the city was $22,375, and the median income for a family was $31,250. Males had a median income of $30,250 versus $21,250 for females. The per capita income for the city was $24,843. There were 6.5% of families and 17.2% of the population living below the poverty line, including 33.3% of under eighteens and 17.6% of those over 64.

== Event ==
- Duck Fest October

== Notable people ==
- Phyllis Bryn-Julson, opera singer
