= Edgeley =

Suburb of Stockport, in Greater Manchester, England

Coordinates: 53.401°N 2.173°W

- Location within Greater Manchester
- Area: 3.01 km^{2} (1.16 sq mi)
- Population: 14,182
  - Density: 4,712/km^{2} (12,200/sq mi)
- Metropolitan borough: Stockport
- Metropolitan county: Greater Manchester
- Region: North West
- Country: England
- Sovereign state: United Kingdom
- Post town: STOCKPORT
- Postcode district: SK3
- Dialling code: 0161
- Police: Greater Manchester
- Fire: Greater Manchester
- Ambulance: North West

Edgeley is a suburb of Stockport, in Greater Manchester, England. It is characterised largely by Victorian terraced housing around Alexandra Park. The population in 2021 was 14,182.

== History ==
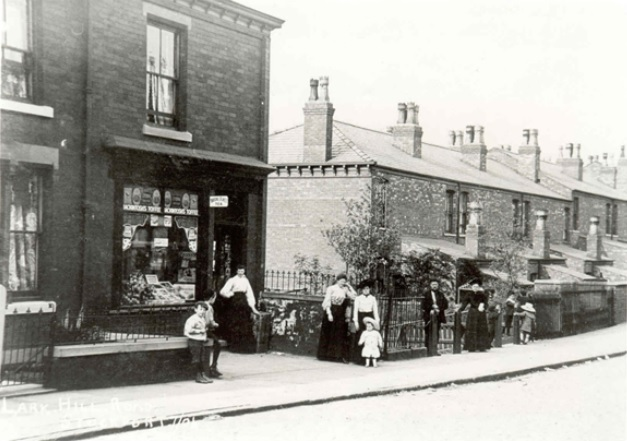
Lark Hill Road, c. 1906

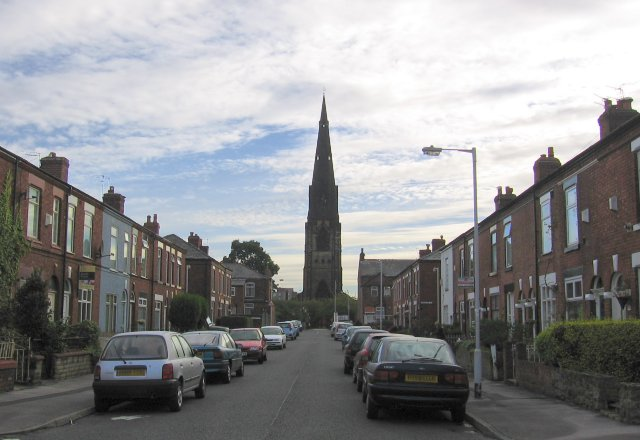
St Matthew's Church, Edgeley, 2005

References to Edgeley, or "Eddyshelegh", are recorded in the early part of the 13th century. However, the main history of the area dates from the beginning of the Industrial Revolution where it was a working class hub, after the decline of industrial Britain, Edgeley, like many northern urban areas, suffered economically and the area fell into decay; after some subtle investment the area is slowly showing signs of improvement.

On 27 November 1792, an advertisement appeared in the Manchester Mercury to let land at Edgeley as:

An Eligible situation for Bleach Ground or Print Field in which there are a number of Fine White Sand Springs with a Rivulet capable of Turning Wash Wheels etc. The Grounds lie very contiguous to the populous Manufacturing Town of Stockport where Bleachers and Printers are both much wanted and every encouragement will be given to a good tenant

William Sykes took the land and established the Sykes Bleaching Company. There were few trees in the area but, as wood was needed in the drying process, he undertook extensive tree-planting in the area. He built a "stately house", Edgeley House, which was the home of the family for succeeding generations until it became Alexandra Park. Wells were sunk including the "Silver Well", and by 1830 these had quadrupled the water supply. Reservoirs were also built. These undertakings were of great value to people in the area in times of excessive drought. The Sykes family originally owned most of the land in Edgeley and employed many people. They invested their wealth back into the area with parks, churches, schools and Edgeley Park.

The Brinksway Chapel, built in 1823, was nicknamed the 'Beef–Steak Chapel' as it was built to encourage vegetarianism by men with shares of one pound each. Saint Matthew's Church was built on the site in 1843.

== Amenities ==
The commercial centre of Edgeley is Castle Street.

Alexandra Park is on the former site of Edgeley House and contains a bowling green, a children's play area, a tennis, basketball and football court and a skate park. The Sykes' reservoir, which originally served the bleaching works, backs onto the Park. The regeneration of the area has seen the mill pond developed into a public space popular with anglers.

Edgeley Park is home to Stockport County F.C..

== Transport ==
Edgeley is served by Stockport railway station (also known as "Stockport Edgeley" or "Edgeley"). It was opened on 15 February 1843 by the Manchester and Birmingham Railway, following completion of Stockport Viaduct just to its north. It is served by Avanti West Coast inter-city services between Manchester Piccadilly and London Euston, with routes to other major locations in Great Britain by other operators; in addition, Northern Trains operates local services within Greater Manchester, Derbyshire and Cheshire.

Bus services are operated by Stagecoach Manchester, Diamond Bus North West and Metroline Manchester; routes connect the area with Stockport Interchange, Altrincham, Cheadle and Wythenshawe.

== Notable people ==
- John Axon GC (1900–1957), a train driver from Edgeley depot, who died while trying to stop a runaway freight train on a 1 in 58 gradient at Chapel-en-le-Frith, in Derbyshire, after a brake failure.
- John Axon (1960–2008), grandson of above, who played Nigel Harper in the ITV series The Royal and attended Avondale High School.
- Sidney Gilliat (1908–1994), English film director, born in Edgeley.
- Peter Hope (b. 1930), composer and arranger, born in Edgeley.
- Daz Sampson (b. 1974), 2006 UK Eurovision Song Contest contestant, grew up in Stockport and attended Avondale High School.
- Richard Sykes (1839–1923), a member of the Sykes family at Edgeley House, founded the town of Edgeley, in North Dakota, United States, in tribute to his birthplace. Other members of the Sykes family include Thomas Hardcastle Sykes (1833–1901), Percy Sykes (1867–1945) and Alan Sykes (1868–1950).
