= South Persia Rifles =

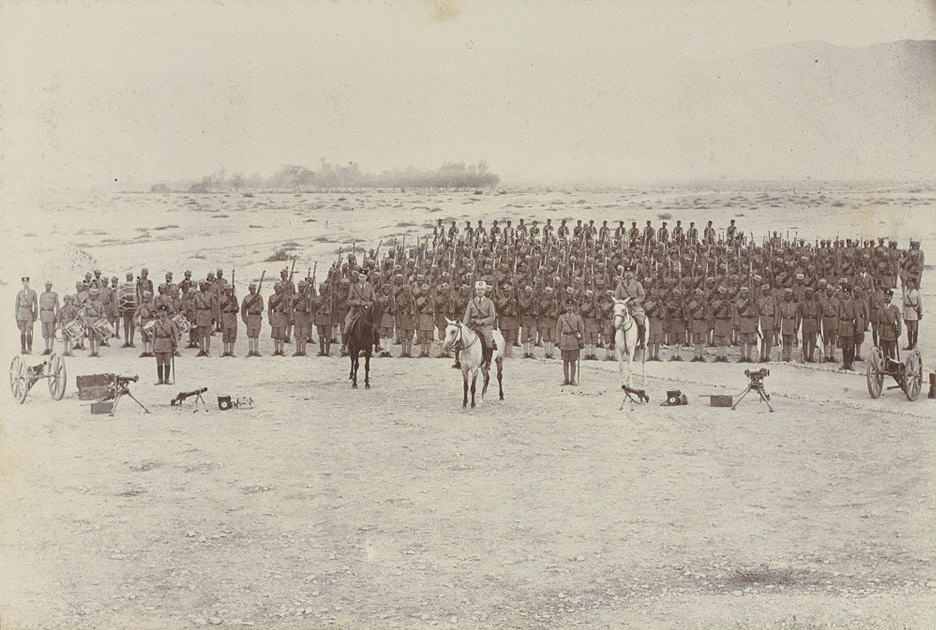
- Officers and men of the South Persia Rifles, c. 1917
- Active: 1916–1921
- Disbanded: 1921
- Country: Iran (Persia)
- Allegiance: British
- Type: infantry with mounted detachments
- Size: approved establishment of up to 11,000
- Part of: British and Persian
- Equipment: British Indian

Commanders
- Notable commanders: Percy Sykes

Insignia
- Uniform: Khaki drill

The South Persia Rifles (Persian: تپانچه‌داران جنوب پارس), also known as SPR, was a Persian military force recruited by the British in 1916 and under British command. They participated in the Persian Campaign of World War I.

== History ==
The British formed the South Persia Rifles in response to German influence in southern Iran in 1915 and early 1916. The German agents influenced tribal groups who were already in rebellion against the British. As a result, the British had to divert troops to Iran rather than Ottoman Iraq. The South Persia Rifles was a measure to use locally raised troops rather than British or Indian units, so that the latter could be sent to the main campaign against the Ottomans in Iraq. With the assent of the Shah’s government, the British were allowed to form a military force of up to 11,000 men to quell the resistive tribes and maintain order.

Sir Percy Sykes was selected by the British to command the new force. In March 1916 he landed in Bandar-Abbas with a few British officers and non-commissioned officers, a company of Indian soldiers, and quantities of weapons and ammunition to equip the troops he recruited. Most of his early recruits came from pro-British tribes. Sykes and his men spread out to cities in southern Iran such as Yazd, Esfahan and Shiraz, as well as Bandar-Abbas. Through the summer and fall of 1916 the South Persia Rifles conducted what to the British were mopping up operations. Sykes also gained formal recognition for the Rifles from the Iranian government.

By December 1916, the South Persia Rifles had brigades located at Shiraz, Kerman, and Bandar-Abbas. Sykes had about 3,300 infantry and 450 cavalry, as well as a few artillery pieces and a machine gun. Training, equipment and organisation was along the lines of the British Indian Army. Winter closed many roads and brought the Rifles relief from tribal attacks. Sykes used the time to train his forces. In 1917, Sykes reached an agreement with the Qashqai tribe, ending their raids, allowing him to focus on other resistive tribes. The Rifles went after the tribes in their strongholds as well as their crops and livestock, crippling them logistically so they could not continue to raid British supply lines and garrisons.

By June 1917, the government that had agreed to the establishment of the Rifles fell, and the new prime minister and cabinet would not recognize them. Iranian attitudes towards the Rifles changed, and by late 1917 there was intense hostility towards the Rifles and the British. The British even approached the United States with a proposal to take the Rifles over, but the US declined due to a lack of officers who could speak the language or were knowledgeable about Iran.

In 1918 word of the worsening situation on the Western Front in France affected the morale of the Iranians in the Rifles and many deserted. The tribes in southern Iran became bolder, attacking Rifle outposts. The strength of the Rifles in April of that year was about 7,000. Iranian resentment towards the Rifles only increased over time. Shia mullahs played a role in encouraging resistance to the British. The Shiraz brigade experienced poor morale, especially amongst the former genderamie in its ranks. That limited its use, and it was nearly disbanded. Desertions greatly reduced the size of the Fars brigade. The Kerman brigade remained loyal. Eventually more regular British units had to be sent to reinforce the Rifles. By October 1918, most tribal resistance had been broken.

After the war, the British continued to maintain the Rifles. In the years after the war, Iran was trying to recreate its armed forces and control internal unrest. While the British supported the development of a new army to keep out the new threat of Soviet influence, they realized that in the long run, the Iranians would not accept an army based on the Rifles, an organization run by foreigners. Even so, the British were not willing to see it merged into the new Iranian Army. In 1921, they disbanded the South Persia Rifles. Many former officers and NCOs from the South Persian Rifles later joined the new Iranian Army.
