= Vaughan Metropolitan Centre =

- City centre
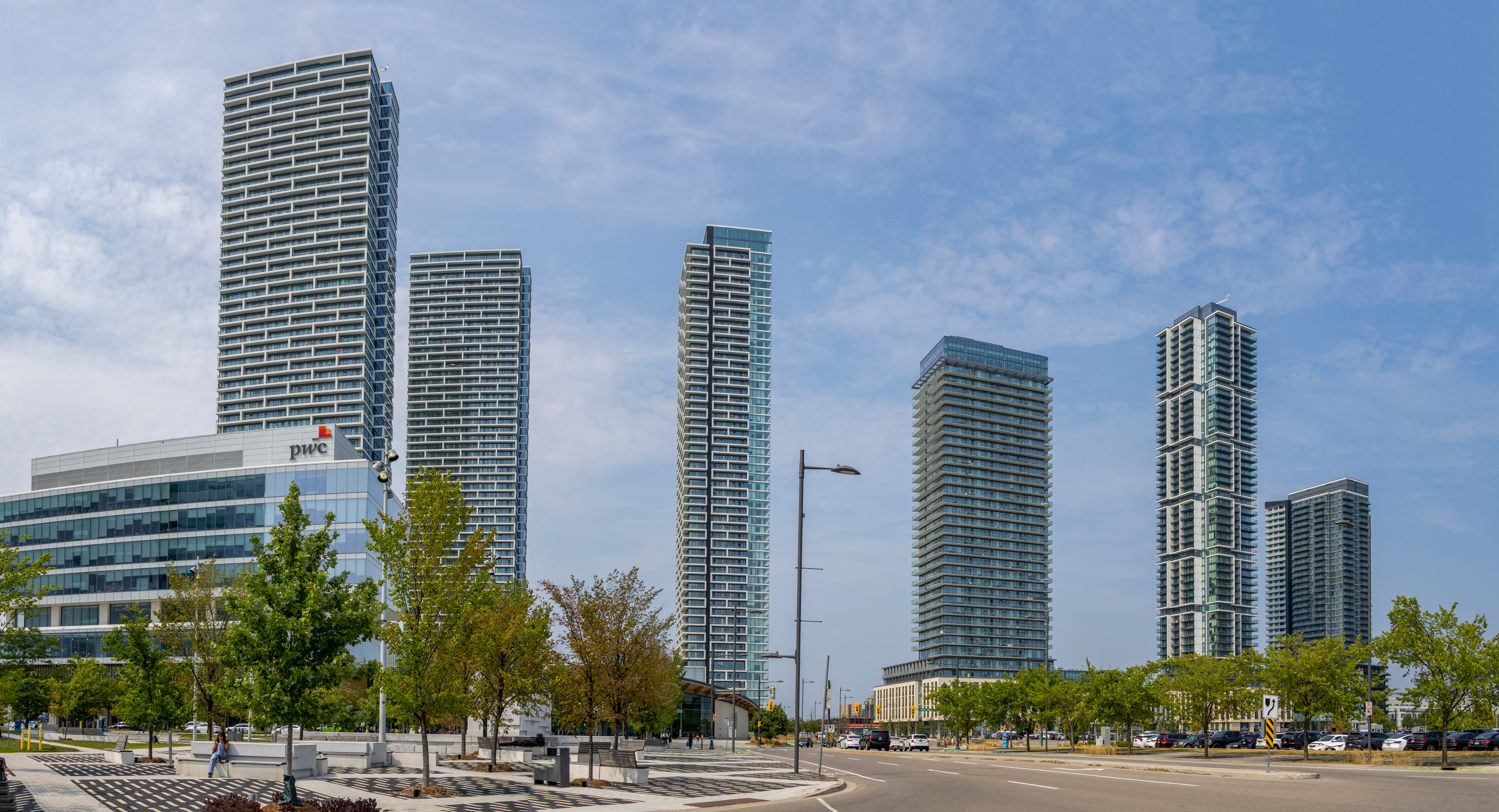
- Vaughan Metropolitan Centre skyline in 2025
- Motto: It'll Move You
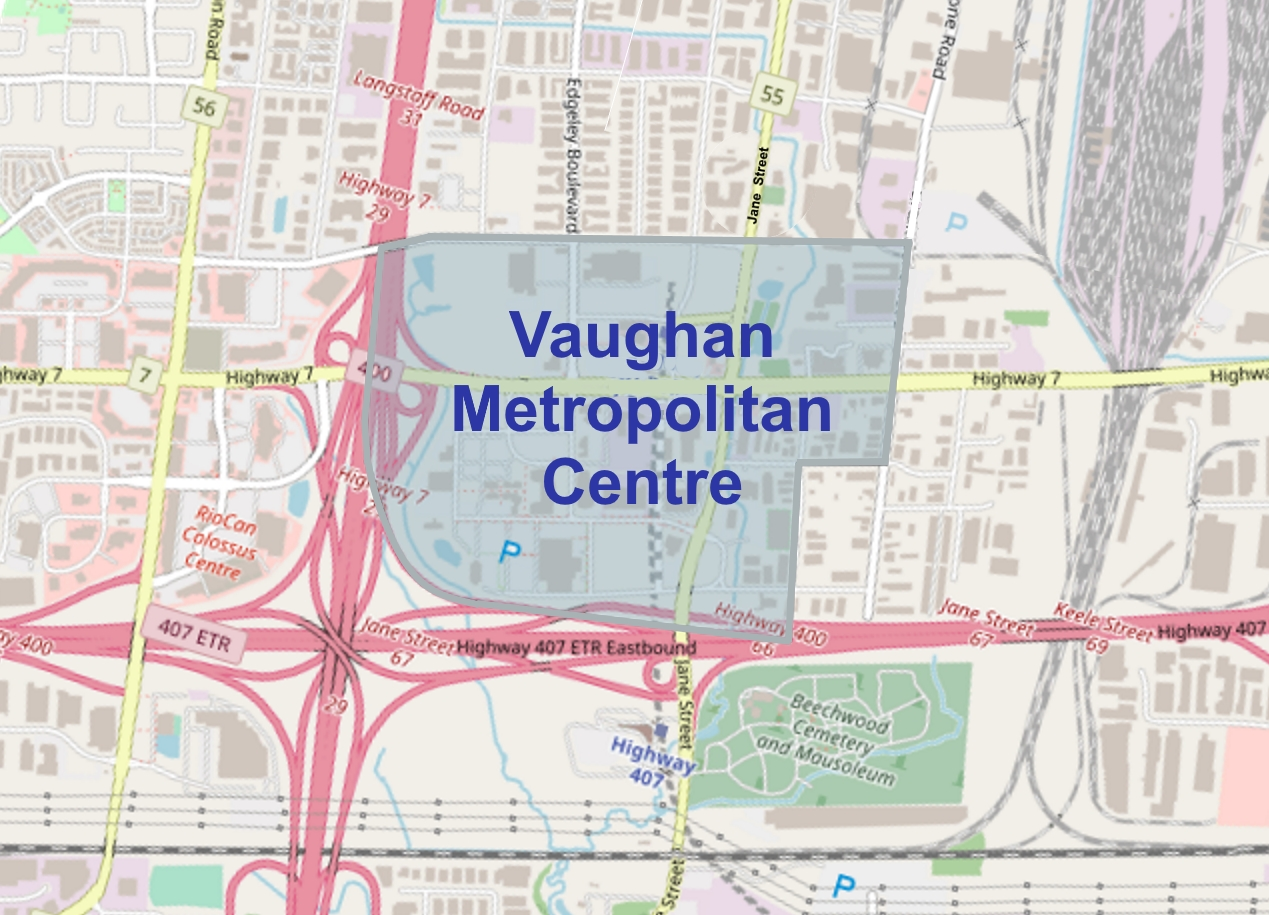
- Location of Vaughan Metropolitan Centre
- Coordinates: 43.7935°N 79.52727°W
- Country: Canada
- Province: Ontario
- Regional Municipality: York
- City: Vaughan
- Website: myvmc.ca

Vaughan Metropolitan Centre is the city centre of Vaughan, Ontario, Canada. Measuring 179 hectares (442 acres), the district is located at the intersection of Highway 7 and Jane Street, northeast of the Highway 400 and Highway 407 interchange, at the site of the historic farming community of Edgeley within the larger district of Concord. The district is home to most of Vaughan's tallest buildings, and is served by the TTC subway station of the same name, which is the northwestern terminus of Line 1 Yonge–University of the Toronto subway system. It is also a major transit hub for York Region Transit (YRT), as well as Viva and Züm bus rapid transit services.

== Name ==
In the summer of 2009, Vaughan's city council announced that they wanted public submissions to suggest a new name for Vaughan's new downtown core. At the time, it was known as "Vaughan Corporate Centre", but the name change was suggested so that the name would "better reflect the true vision and future of this key hub". Nearly 1,600 entries were submitted; the subcommittee (chaired by Ward 4 Councillor Sandra Yeung Racco) decided on the name of "Vaughan Metropolitan Centre" for the area.

== History ==
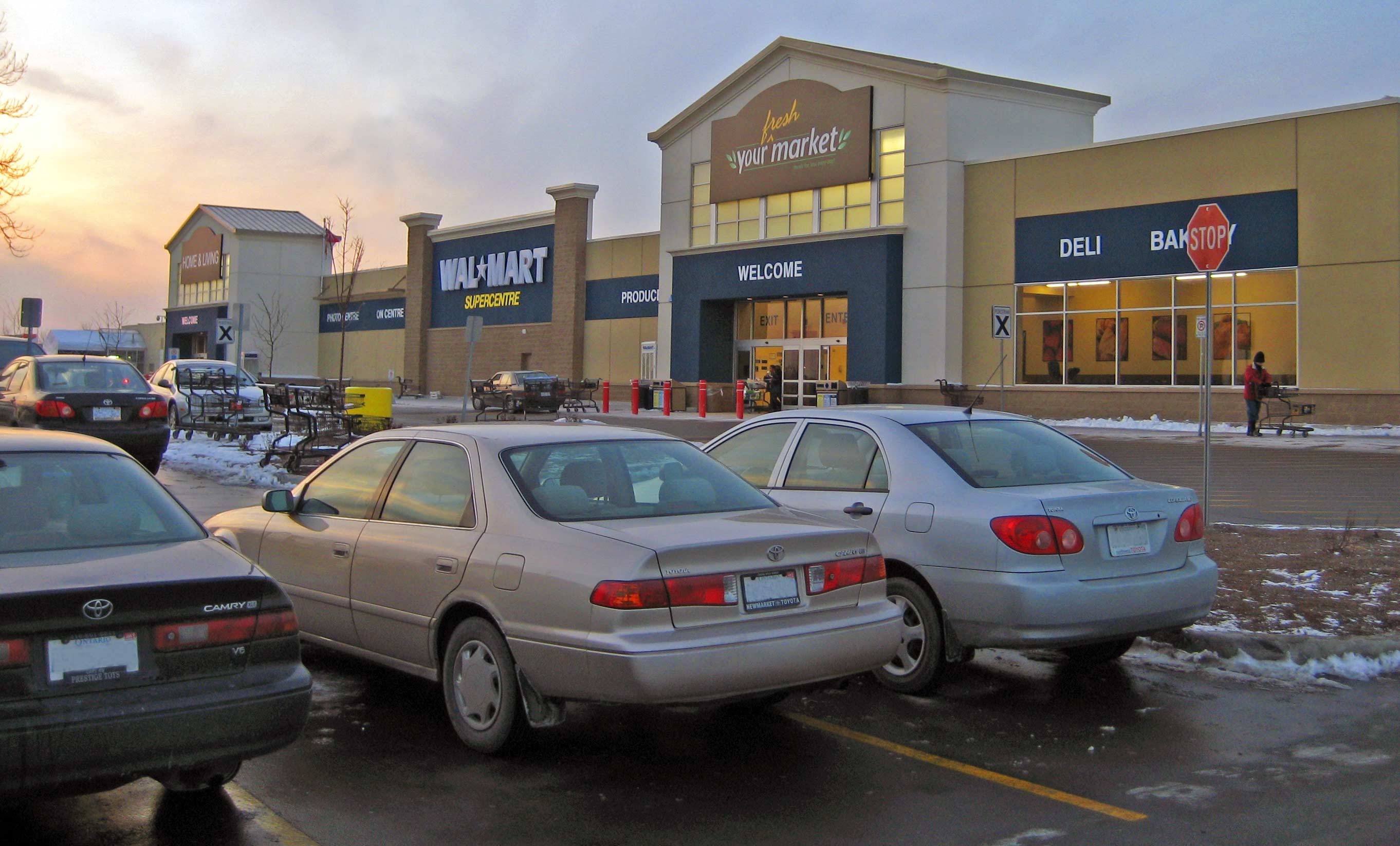
Former Wal-Mart Supercentre (now closed and relocated). This site is being redeveloped into higher density uses.

The Town of Vaughan officially became a City in 1991. It was made up of a number of historic communities, most with their own historic village or town centre, and so Vaughan committed to building a new business and commercial core at the intersection of Highways 400 and 407. Approved in 1998, Official Plan Amendment 500 called for the Vaughan Corporate Centre, as it was then branded, to become a focal point for business activity and major commercial development.

The plan truly found its legs in 2006 when the province announced that the Spadina subway line would be extended to Vaughan, and it designated the area around it as an Urban Growth Centre. More designations and plans followed, defining the Vaughan Metropolitan Centre and preparing it for development.

In 2010, when Maurizio Bevilacqua became Mayor of Vaughan, he made the Vaughan Metropolitan Centre one of his key priorities. He formed the VMC Sub Committee and began organizing the key infrastructure.

Announcements for the VMC's first residential development in 2011 (Expo City) and office development in 2012 (KPMG Tower), proved that the blueprint had market potential. Development and interest have accelerated ever since.

The Line 1 Yonge–University subway extension to VMC opened on December 17, 2017.

== Development ==
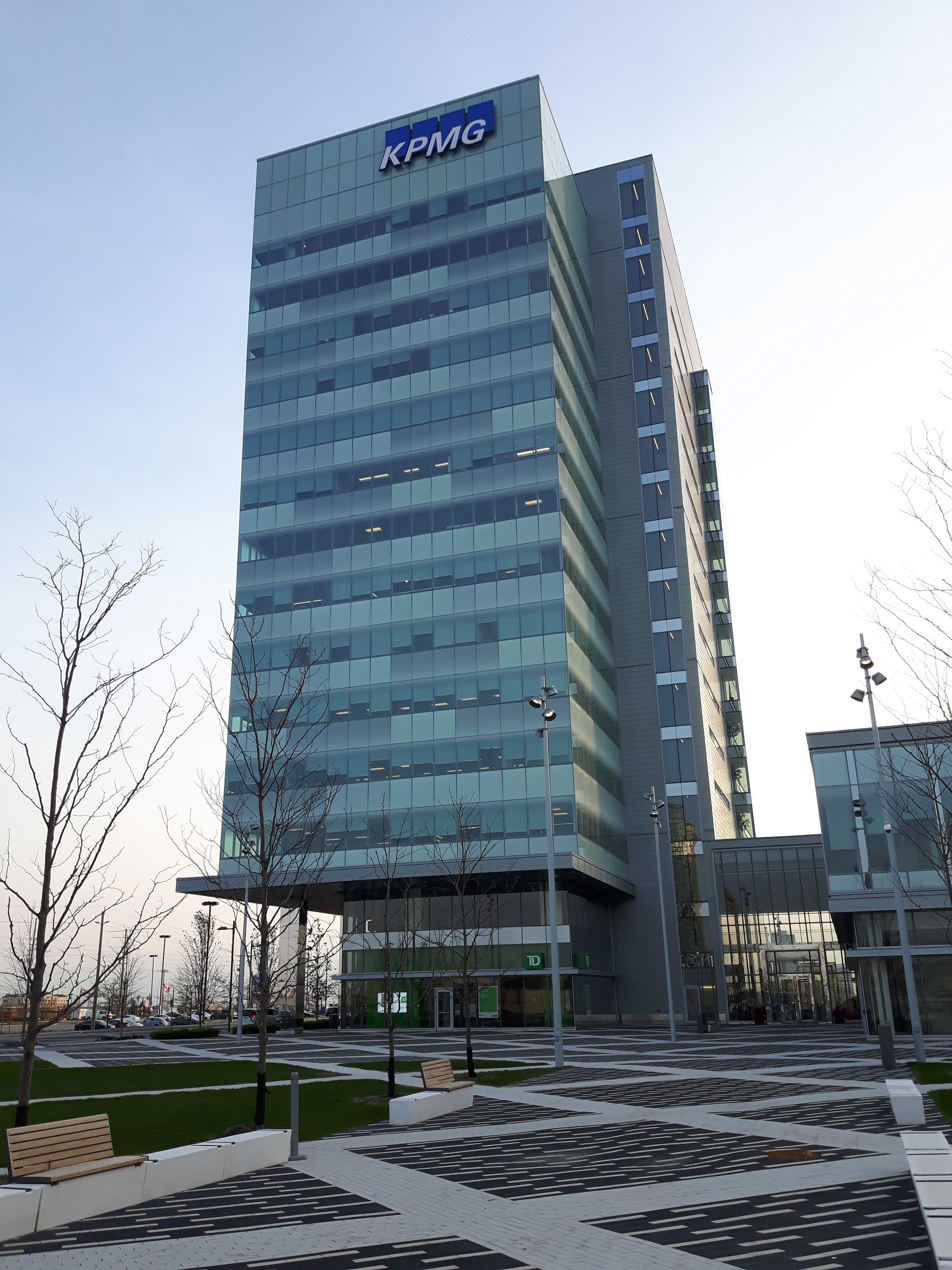
100 New Park Place was opened in 2016 as the first highrise development in the area. The grounds were designed by Claude Cormier.

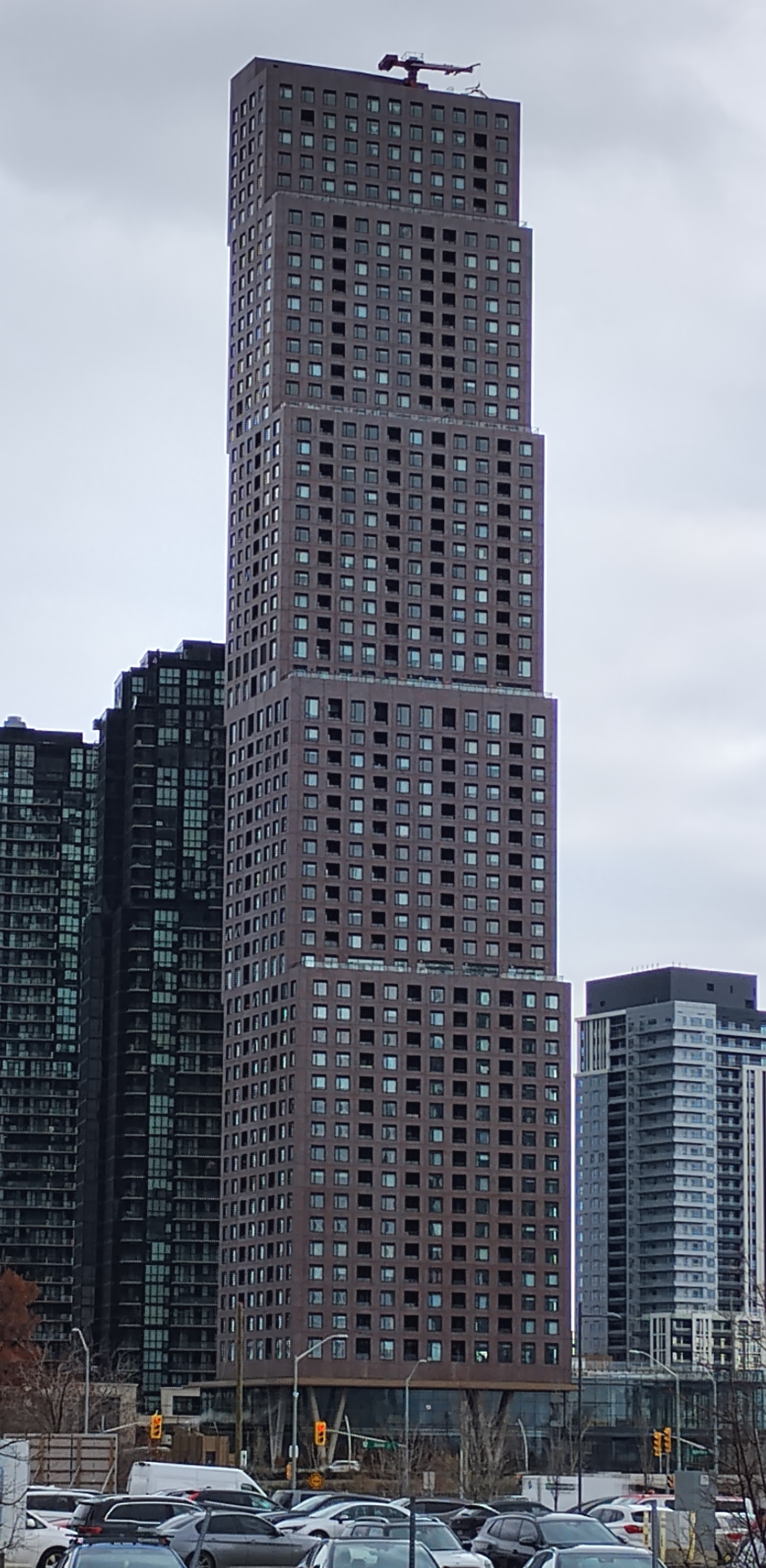
CG Tower

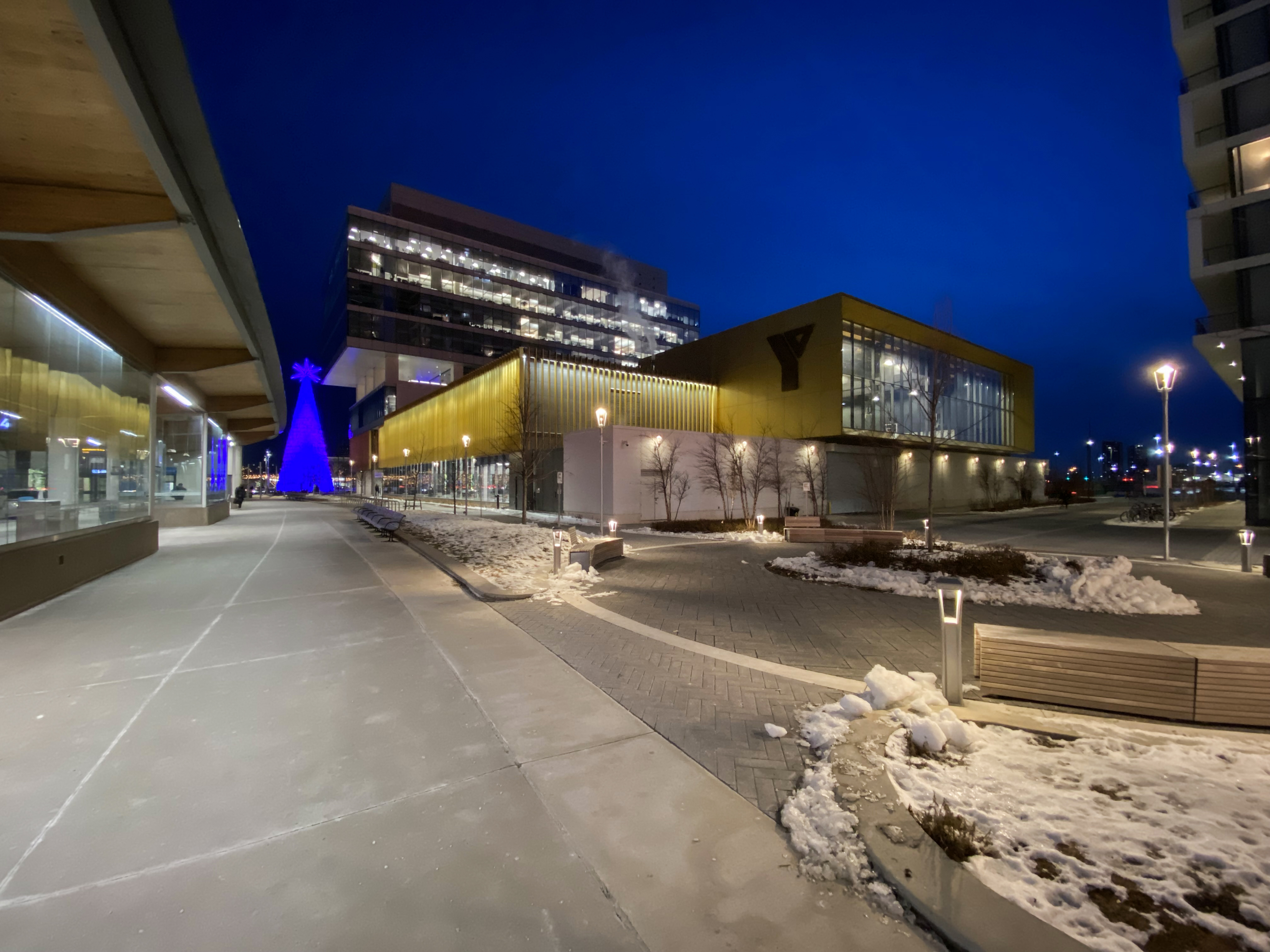
The YMCA at The David Braley Vaughan Centre

Prior to the arrival of the subway, the 179-hectare (440-acre) area was low density featuring big box stores such as Walmart. Vaughan projects that by 2031, the new downtown will have 25,000 residents and employment for more than 11,000 people.

As of 2019, developments in Vaughan Metropolitan Centre include eight residential towers and two office towers built or under construction. Another 13 developments are proposed, submitted and approved.

VMC will comprise distinct development precincts including residential neighbourhoods, office districts, employment areas and mixed-use areas, all linked by a robust system of parks, squares and open spaces and a fine grain grid pattern of streets.

The Official Plan states as a policy that the City shall encourage and facilitate the establishment of the following in the VMC:

- Major offices
- Government offices
- Post-secondary educational institutions
- Cultural facilities
- Public institutions
- Major civic public spaces and parks
- Socially diverse residential neighbourhoods that contain a mix of housing types, including housing suitable for seniors and families with children
- An open space and natural heritage system along the Black Creek corridor.

In 2017, a website was launched in an effort to raise awareness, provide resources, engage members of the community, and highlight the progress of the Vaughan Metropolitan Centre development.

Further details of the City of Vaughan's plans for expansion and development are included as part of the council's secondary plan.

== Public transit ==
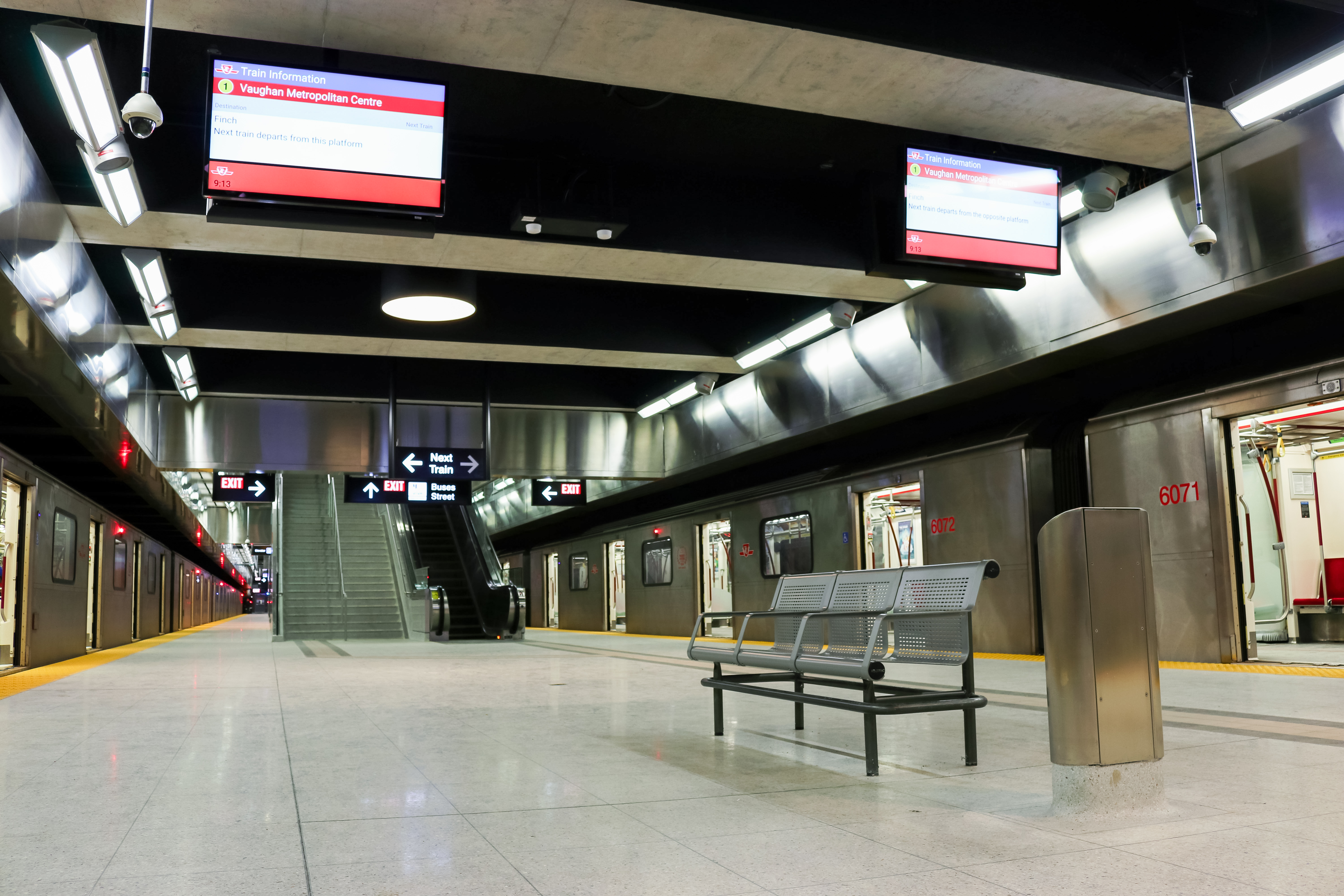
Subway platform level of Vaughan Metropolitan Centre station

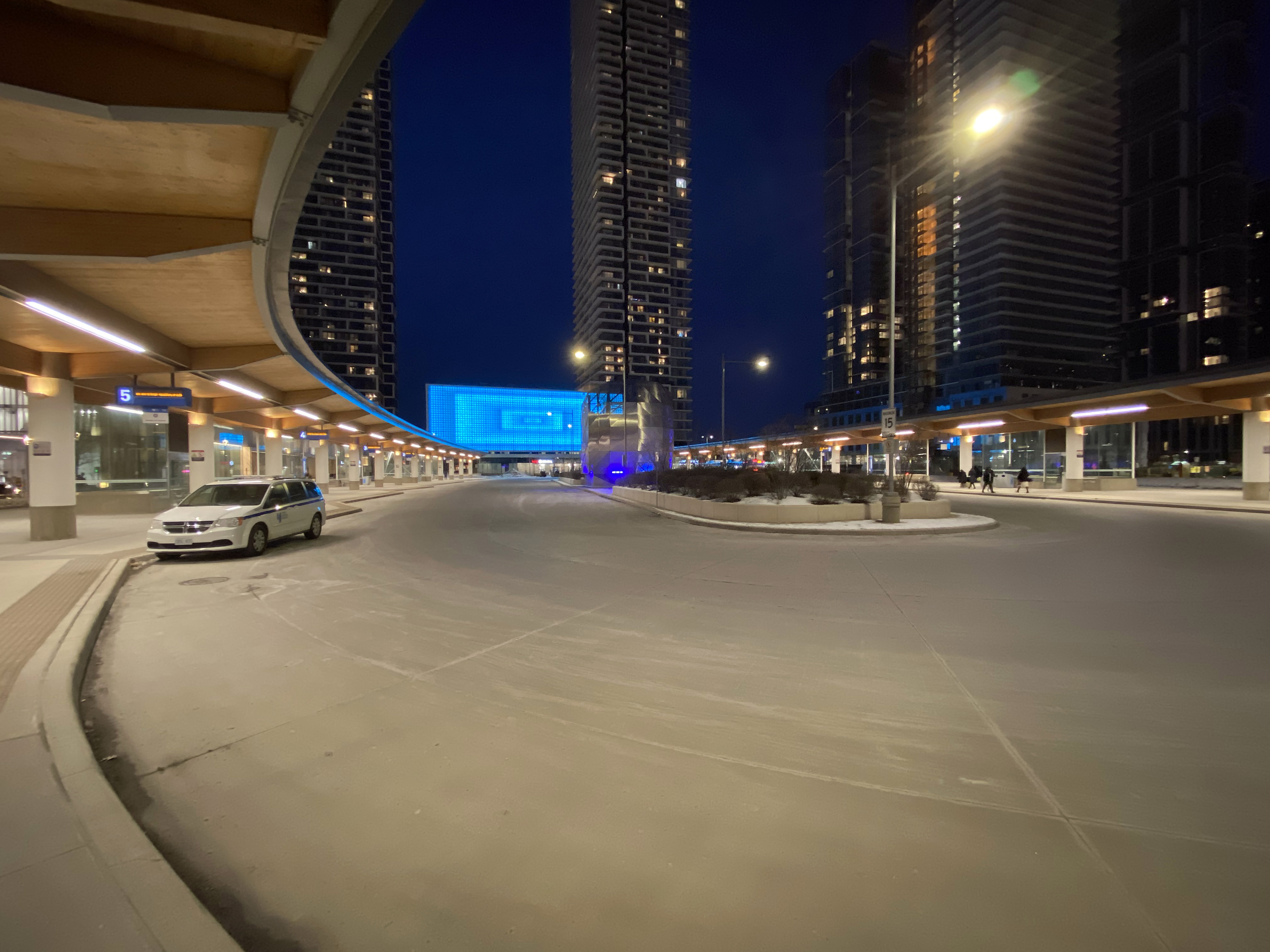
Smart Centres Terminal at night

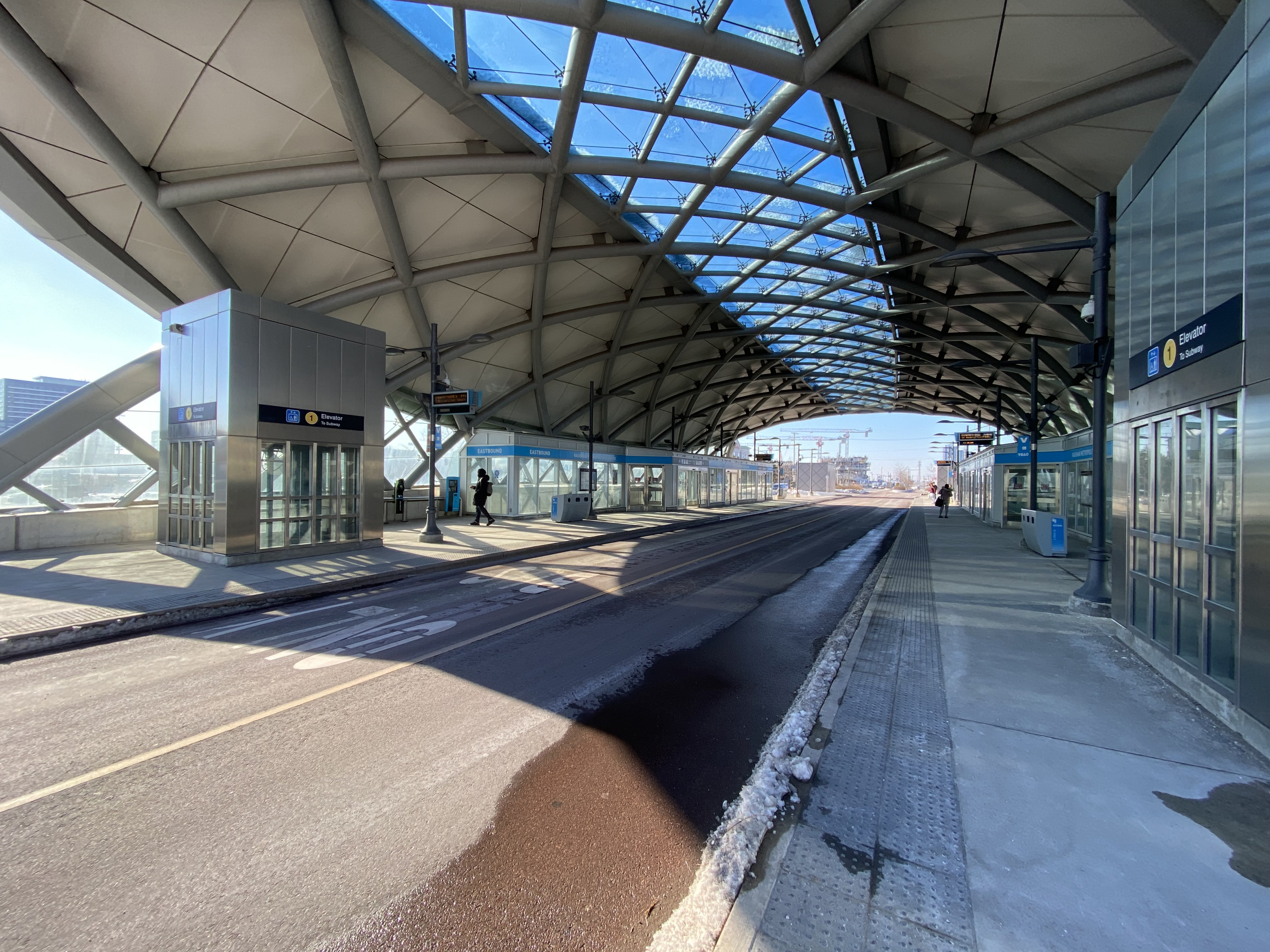
Platforms for Viva buses at the Vaughan Metropolitan Centre Vivastation

VMC is served by both York Region Transit (YRT) and Brampton Transit buses, and the Toronto Transit Commission (TTC) subway.

Vaughan Metropolitan Centre station is located at the intersection of Highway 7 and Millway Avenue, just west of Jane Street. It is the northwestern terminus of Line 1 Yonge–University. The area is also served by YRT (which includes Viva) and Brampton Transit's Züm buses on Highway 7 and Jane Street. Viva Orange and 501 Züm Queen buses travel along the Highway 7 Rapidway, which features a covered Vivastation in its centre for transferring to the subway. Conventional YRT buses, with the exception of Route 77, which provides local service along Highway 7 and uses on-street stops, connect with the station at the SmartCentres Place Bus Terminal.

The subway station is part of the TTC Toronto fare zone and no extra fare is charged to enter and exit. After the implementation of Ontario's One Fare Program in 2024, transfers between the subway and the connecting York Region and Brampton Transit buses are free for electronic payment, although double fares are still charged for cash payments.

== See also ==
- List of tallest buildings in Vaughan
