= Sike =

Sike may refer to:

- A small Stream, also syke

== People ==
- András Sike (born 1965), Hungarian bantamweight Greco-Roman wrestler
- Jozsef Sike (born 1968), Hungarian sport shooter
- Wu Sike (born 1946), senior diplomat of the People's Republic of China

== Other uses ==
- Sike Station
- Sike Williams
- Supersingular isogeny key exchange

== See also ==
- Sikes (disambiguation)
- Syke (disambiguation)
