= Bleachers' Association =

The Bleachers' Association was formed on 7 June, 1900, bringing together around 60 bleaching companies mostly from Lancashire. They were based at Blackfriars House, on the junction of Parsonage and Blackfriars Street in Salford.

Following their foundation they promptly issued debentures for those who might want to invest in their business.

In 1963, the company was reformed as Whitecroft Industrial Holdings.
