= Thomas Hardcastle Sykes =

Thomas Hardcastle Sykes (15 February 1833 – 25 April 1901) was an English bleacher and businessman and was High Sheriff of Cheshire.

Sykes was born at Edgeley House Stockport, the third son of Richard Sykes, owner of the Sykes Bleaching Company, and his wife Jane Hardcastle. He went to Rugby School and then joined the family bleaching business. He was involved in several successful business speculations. Sykes was a J.P. and Deputy Lieutenant of Cheshire and was High Sheriff of Cheshire in 1899. He was also a captain in the 20th Cheshire Royal Volunteers.

Sykes lived at Cringle House on Schools Hill Cheadle, where he died aged 68. He was buried in a family vault with his wife in Cheadle St Mary's Parish Church graveyard

Sykes married Mary Platt, daughter of John Platt, of Platt Brothers textile machinery manufacturers and MP for Oldham. She was born 3 February 1844 and died 22 August 1875. Their son Alan Sykes continued the family business and was MP for Knutsford. Sykes brother Richard Sykes was a pioneering rugby player and landowner in Dakota. His nephew Percy Sykes was a soldier and explorer of Central Asia.

Honorary titles
Preceded by Richard Hobson	High Sheriff of Cheshire; 1899	Succeeded by Benjamin Chaffers Roberts
