= Elisabeth Sikes =

American geoscientist and academic

Elisabeth Lynn Sikes
- Education: Massachusetts Institute of Technology; University of North Carolina-Chapel Hill; Wesleyan University
- Scientific career
- Workplaces: Rutgers University
- Thesis: Refinement and application of a new paleotemperature estimation technique (1990)

Elisabeth Lynn Sikes is an American geoscientist who is a professor at Rutgers University. Her research considers carbon cycling. She was awarded the 2022 Scientific Committee on Antarctic Research Medal for Excellence in Research.

== Early life and education ==
Sikes was an undergraduate student at Wesleyan University, where she graduated cum laude in environmental sciences. She moved to the University of North Carolina at Chapel Hill for graduate studies. After earning her masters, she moved to Massachusetts Institute of Technology (MIT) for her doctorate. She completed graduate research in geological oceanography at the Woods Hole Oceanographic Institution (WHOI) in the MIT/WHOI Joint Program. Her doctoral research on the refinement of techniques to estimate paleotemperatures. She was supported by the Australian Research Council to work as a postdoc at the University of Tasmania before working for the Australian Geological Survey Organization (now Geoscience Australia). She moved to New Zealand in 1997 and worked at the University of Auckland.

== Research and career ==
In 2001, Sikes returned to the United States, where she was appointed to the faculty at Rutgers University. Her research is based in paleoceanography and carbon cycling. She studies circulation in the Southern Ocean, and how those processes trap and release carbon dioxide over glacial timescales. As part of these efforts, she studies temperature changes in the oceans around New Zealand using biomarkers and foramiferally estimates. She has taken part in sixteen oceanographic voyages and serves as Chair of the CLIVAR/CliC/SCAR Southern Ocean Region Panel.

Sikes is also interested in the sources and sinks of terrestrial carbon in modern environments over shorter time scales. For these studies, she makes use of isotope analysis. She investigated how useful the Uk-37 index was for estimating paleotemperatures and predicting sea surface temperatures. This included studying whether the 14C ages of alkenones could be used to estimate paleotemperature, as lateral transport can cause these molecules to be several thousand years older than foraminifera found in the same deposit.

== Awards and honors ==
- 2004 National Science Foundation ADVANCE Fellow Award
- 2012 Hanse Fellow at the Institute of Advanced Study
- 2018 Rutgers University Teaching Excellence award
- 2020 American Geophysical Union Cesare Emiliani Lecture Paleoceaongraphy/Paleoclimatology and Ocean Sciences sections Award
- 2022 Scientific Committee on Antarctic Research Medal for Excellence in Antarctic Research

== Selected publications ==
- John K Volkman; Stephanie M Barrett; Susan I Blackburn; Maged P Mansour; Elisabeth L Sikes; François Gelin (November 1998). "Microalgal biomarkers: A review of recent research developments". Organic Geochemistry. 29 (5–7): 1163–1179. Bibcode:1998OrGeo..29.1163V. doi:10.1016/s0146-6380(98)00062-x. ISSN 0146-6380. Wikidata Q123333061.
- C. K. Paull; B. Hecker; R. Commeau; et al. (November 1, 1984). "Biological communities at the Florida escarpment resemble hydrothermal vent taxa". Science. 226 (4677): 965–967. Bibcode:1984Sci...226..965P. doi:10.1126/science.226.4677.965. ISSN 0036-8075. PMID 17737352. Wikidata Q34669601.
- John K. Volkman; Stephanie M. Barrerr; Susan I. Blackburn; Elisabeth L. Sikes (February 1995). "Alkenones in Gephyrocapsa oceanica: Implications for studies of paleoclimate". Geochimica et Cosmochimica Acta. 59 (3): 513–520. Bibcode:1995GeCoA..59..513V. doi:10.1016/0016-7037(95)00325-t. ISSN 0016-7037. Wikidata Q56028533.
- Elisabeth L. Sikes; Catherine R. Samson; Thomas P. Guilderson; William R. Howard (June 1, 2000). "Old radiocarbon ages in the southwest Pacific Ocean during the last glacial period and deglaciation". Nature. 405 (6786): 555–559. Bibcode:2000Natur.405..555S. doi:10.1038/35014581. ISSN 1476-4687. PMID 10850711. Wikidata Q39462069.
