= List of tallest buildings in Markham =

Skyline of Markham
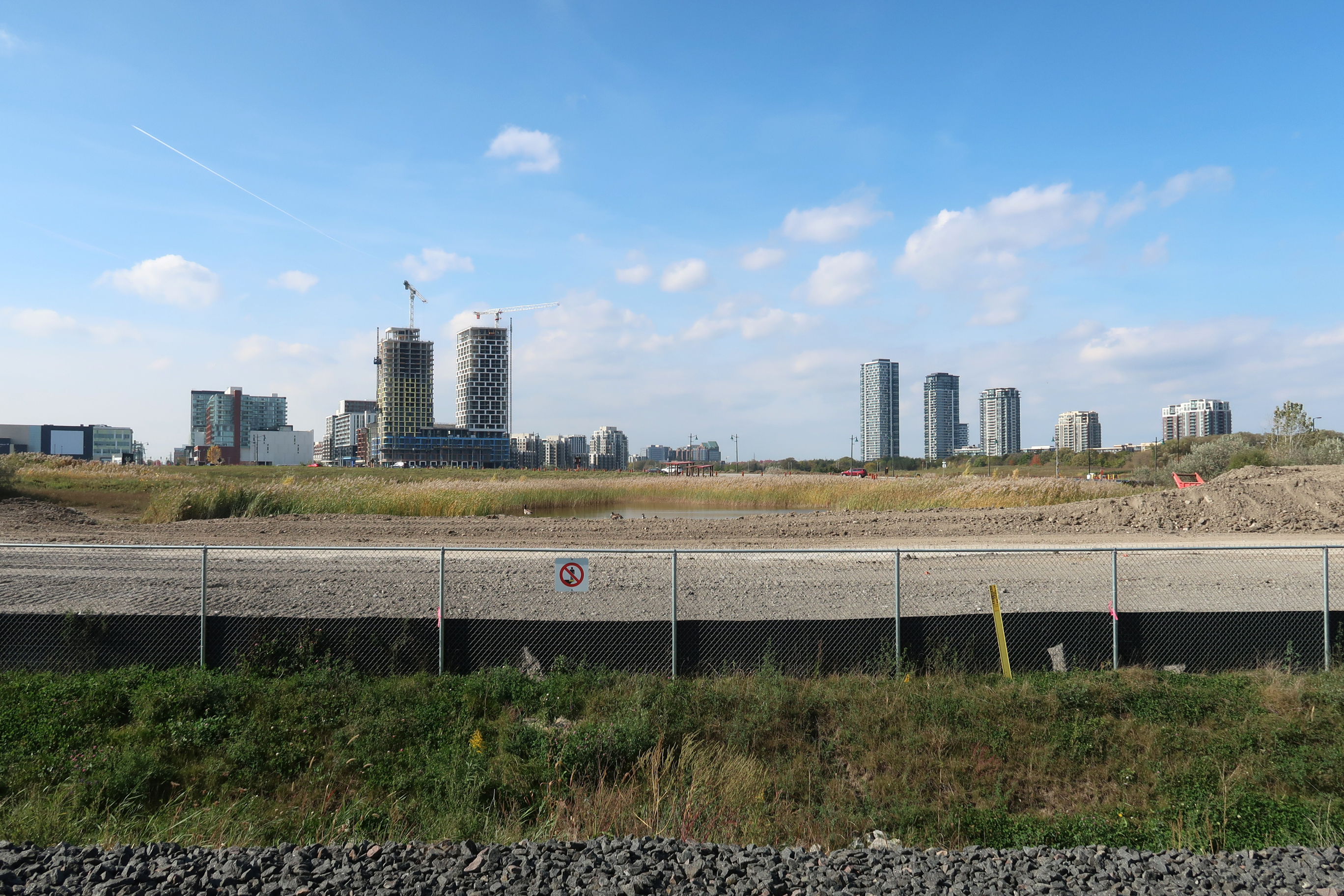
- Downtown Markham in 2023
- Tallest building: Riverview III at Uptown Markham (2023)
- Tallest building height: 126 m (413 ft)

Number of tall buildings (2026)
- Taller than 75 m (246 ft): 14
- Taller than 100 m (328 ft): 6

Markham is a city in the Greater Toronto Area, located north of Toronto. Its growth has led to the emergence of low and high-rise buildings to reduce urban sprawl. Several residential high-rises reaching above 50 m (164 ft) have emerged in the 2010s, a trend that has intensified in the early 2020s. Most of the city's tall buildings are located in the area of Downtown Markham along Highway 7 from Warden Avenue to Kennedy Road and mainly residential structures.

Mainly a suburban area, Markham's buildings are mostly residential condos, hotels with a few office towers. Height restrictions were in place near Buttonville Municipal Airport that have been eliminated with the closure of the airport.

== History ==
Number of buildings by height in Markham by the end of each year, based on the information in this article. Click on the legend to toggle a specific height on or off. View chart definition.

== Map of tallest buildings ==
This map displays the location of buildings taller than 75 m (246 ft) in Markham, which are distributed throughout the city across multiple locations.

Buildings taller than 75 m (246 ft) in Markham.

== Tallest buildings ==
This list ranks completed buildings in Markham that stand at least 75 m (246 ft) tall as of 2026, based on standard height measurement. This includes spires and architectural details but does not include antenna masts. The “Year” column indicates the year of completion. Estimated heights are in italics. Buildings tied in height are sorted by year of completion with earlier buildings ranked first, and then alphabetically.

Was the tallest building in Markham upon completion

Rank	Name	Image	Location	Height m (ft)	Floors	Year	Purpose	Notes
1	Riverview III at Uptown Markham		43°51′19″N 79°19′45″W	126 (413) (Note: Sources do not state the exact height of this building. This figure is an estimated minimum height based on the number of above-ground floors, assuming a height of 3 metres (9.8 feet) per floor. This figure may change as more data becomes available.)	42	2023	Residential	Tallest building in Markham since 2023. Tallest building completed in Markham in the 2020s.
2	Riverview II at Uptown Markham		43°51′21″N 79°19′44″W	108 (354)	36	2023	Residential	
3	Pavilia Towers I	—	43°50′25″N 79°23′51″W	108 (354)	36	2023	Residential	
4	World on Yonge I	—	43°48′08″N 79°25′14″W	105.5 (346)	31	2014	Residential	Tallest building in Markham from 2014 to 2023. Tallest building completed in Markham in the 2010s.
5	World on Yonge II	—	43°48′10″N 79°25′15″W	105.5 (346)	31	2014	Residential	Tallest building in Markham from 2014 to 2023. Tallest building completed in Markham in the 2010s.
6	Gallery Towers I		43°51′05″N 79°19′24″W	102.5 (336)	30	2026	Residential	
7	Pavilia Towers II	—	43°50′26″N 79°23′47″W	99 (325)	33	2023	Residential	
8	The Vanguard	—	43°48′02″N 79°25′13″W	98.2 (322)	27	2021	Residential	
9	Riverside at Uptown Markham	—	43°51′22″N 79°19′40″W	89 (292)	28	2018	Residential	
10	Parkside Tower II	—	43°48′10″N 79°25′12″W	88.1 (289)	27	2015	Residential	
11	Gallery Towers II		43°51′03″N 79°19′23″W	87.5 (287)	25	2026	Residential	
12	Markham Mon Sheong Court	—	43°49′35″N 79°17′57″W	86.6 (284)	24	2016	Residential	Tallest retirement building in Markham.
13	World on Yonge Office/Hotel Tower	—	43°48′13″N 79°25′16″W	81 (266)	20	2014	Mixed-use	Also known as Office on Yonge / Liberty Suites. Mixed-use office and hotel building. Tallest mixed-use building in Markham.
14	Upper Village I	—	43°53′48″N 79°15′57″W	76.8 (252)	20	2013	Residential	Tallest building in Markham briefly from 2013 to 2014.

== Tallest under construction or proposed ==
=== Under construction ===
The following table includes buildings under construction in Markham that are planned to be at least 75 m (246 ft) tall as of 2026, based on standard height measurement. The “Year” column indicates the expected year of completion. Buildings that are on hold are not included.

Name	Height m (ft)	Floors	Year	Notes
Unioncity B	147.7 (485)	42	2027	
Pangea I at Uptown Markham	147 (482)	45	2027	
Unioncity A	140 (459)	40	2027	
Pangea II at Uptown Markham	132.2 (434)	40	2027	
Unioncity C	108 (354)	36	2027	

=== Proposed ===
The following table includes approved and proposed buildings in Markham that are expected to be at least 150 m (492 ft) tall as of 2026, based on standard height measurement. The “Year” column indicates the expected year of completion. A dash “–“ indicates information about the building’s height, floor count, or year of completion is unknown or has not been released. This list is not exhaustive.

Name	Height m (ft)	Floors	Year	Notes
Shoppes on Steeles A	198.4	59	2029	
Shoppes on Steeles B	188.4	55	2029	
Shoppes on Steeles C	186.3	59	2029	
Shoppes on Steeles D	168.8	50	2029	
Shoppes on Steeles E	152.6	45	2029	

== Timeline of tallest buildings ==
This lists buildings that once held the title of the tallest building in Markham.

Name	Image	Years as tallest	Height m (ft)	Floors	Notes
Upper Village I	—	2013–2014	76.8 (252)	20	
World on Yonge I	—	2014–2023	105.5 (346)	31	
World on Yonge II	—	2014–2023	105.5 (346)	31	
Riverview III at Uptown Markham		2023–present	126 (413)	42	Height given is an estimate.

== See also ==
- List of tallest buildings in Ontario
- Canadian architecture
