= Edgeley, Vaughan =

Edgeley Vaughan Metropolitan Centre
- Former hamlet
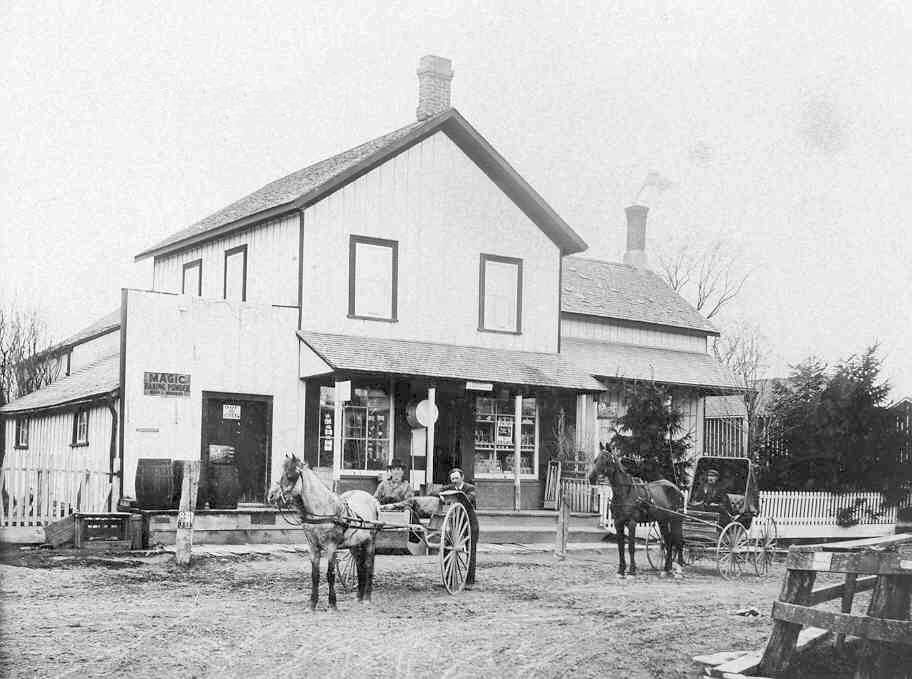
- Post office in Edgeley (circa 1900)
- Interactive map of Edgeley
- Coordinates: 43°47′29″N 79°31′13″W
- Country: Canada
- Province: Ontario
- Regional Municipality: York
- City: Vaughan

Government
  - City mayor: Linda Jackson
- NTS Map: 030M13
- GNBC Code: FBBRL

Edgeley was a small rural community located in the city of Vaughan in York Region, Ontario, Canada, which today is the site of Vaughan's planned downtown core; Vaughan Metropolitan Centre. The first inhabitants of the Edgeley area immigrated from Somerset County, Pennsylvania, circa 1800. Early family names were Smith, Stong, Shunk, Hoover, Burkholder, Muskrat, Snider, Brown, and Dalziel. A Mennonite church, built of logs in 1824 on the northern portion of Lot #7, Concession #4, was one of the first churches built in Vaughan Township. A steam-powered shingle mill stood on the northwest corner of Highway 7 and Jane Street. A hotel was located on the northeast corner, with a general store on the southeast corner. The store contained the Edgeley post office from 1872 until 1960. Just south of the store, Samuel Snider operated a horse-powered cider mill. His son-in-law, Abraham Winger, and Abraham's brother Henry, later assumed the business, putting up a new steam-powered mill and producing apple cider, butter and jelly until the early 1900s.

The area was also served by a blacksmith, a shoemaker, a casket maker, a dressmaking establishment, a chopping mill, a woodworking shop, which supplied wagons and buggies, two slaughterhouses and a community hall. The Edgeley farmers club was organized in 1917, and for years the farmers in the area obtained their supplies of coal, binder twine, salt and other necessities through the club. The club's annual oyster supper was one of the community's social highlights. The oldest extant Mennonite meeting house in Ontario was moved to Black Creek Pioneer Village during the autumn of 1976.

Edgeley was famous for fruits (mainly apples), thereby supporting many of the settlers who worked its fertile lands. Almost the entire landscape of Edgeley was covered in fruit trees, most notably west of Jane Street and north of Highway 7. Because of these fertile lands, great success came to the town's settlers, and today, many streets in and around Edgeley have been named after them and their products. The largest park in Vaughan is Edgeley Pond and Park.

== See also ==
- Vaughan Metropolitan Centre
