= Tatton Sykes =

Tatton Sykes or Sir Tatton Sykes may refer to:

== People ==
- Sir Tatton Sykes, 4th Baronet, (1772–1863), English landowner and stock breeder
- Sir Tatton Sykes, 5th Baronet, (1826–1913), English landowner, racehorse breeder and eccentric

== Other uses ==
- Sir Tatton Sykes (horse), a racehorse
