= Syke (disambiguation) =

Syke or SYKE may refer to:

== Places ==
- Syke, a town in Lower Saxony, Germany
- Syke (Cilicia), a town of ancient Cilicia

== People ==
- Big Syke (1968–2016), American rapper
- Syke Pachino (born 1978), Spanish-American hip-hop artist

== Other uses ==
- Syke (TV series), a Finnish television series
- Syke or sike, term for ravine or narrow valley in parts of the UK
- Syke railway station, serving Syke, Germany
- Finnish Environment Institute (Finnish: Suomen ympäristökeskus)
- Fountain (heraldry), a roundel

== See also ==
- Sike (disambiguation)
