= Thomas Sykes (Mississippi politician) =

American politician

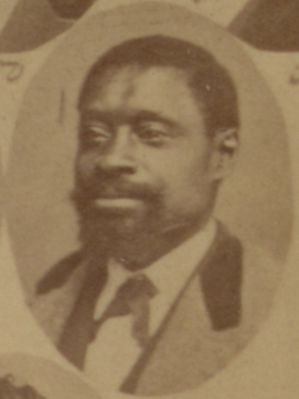

Thomas Sykes (born in Georgia, United States) was an American politician. He was elected to the Mississippi House of Representatives from Panola County in 1873. He was African American and had a wife and children.

== See also ==
- African American officeholders from the end of the Civil War until before 1900
