= Alan Sykes =

British politician

Sir Alan John Sykes, 1st Baronet (11 April 1868 – 21 May 1950) was an English businessman in the bleaching industry and Conservative politician in Cheshire.

== Biography ==
Sykes was born at Cringle House Cheadle, the second son of Thomas Hardcastle Sykes of the Sykes Bleaching Company and his wife Mary Platt daughter of John Platt MP for Oldham. He was known as Jack. He was left motherless in 1875, and in 1881 went away to Rugby School, following his brothers and cousins. He then went to Oriel College, Oxford and while at Oxford joined the Freemasons, to which he remained deeply committed in his adult life. He entered the family bleaching company at the age of 23 and worked his way through the various departments of the bleachworks before becoming manager. Sykes played cricket for Cheshire Gentlemen and hunted with the Cheshire hounds. He became a Justice of the Peace in 1897 and was active in the 3rd Volunteer Battalion, Cheshire Regiment until 1904. After his father died in 1901, he took on a number of local civic positions in Stockport, becoming treasurer of the Infirmary and a Governor of the Grammar School. Sykes was interested in agriculture, running Edgeley Home Farm and the family's estates in Canada of 13,000 acres (53 km^{2}) in Saskatchewan. He travelled extensively in his early years to America and Canada, and also to South Africa, Egypt, India and Russia and was an early enthusiast for motoring and flying.

In 1907 Sykes was adopted as the Conservative candidate for Knutsford and a year later gave up the management of the Edgeley Bleachworks, while remaining director of the Bleachers' Association. In April 1910, he was appointed deputy lieutenant of Cheshire, and from 1910 to 1911 he was mayor of Stockport, the fourth generation of the family to hold this office. Before and after the first world war, Sykes was a leading Conservative organizer in the North West, chairing the Lancashire and Cheshire Federation of Junior Unionist organization. In January 1910, as a keen Tariff Reformer, he was elected MP for Knutsford, taking control from the Liberal. Unsatisfied with the political support he was receiving from the local press, in 1912 he gained control of the Stockport Advertiser Group, which was in fact owned by Swain & Co under the direction of an uncle. In parliament he kept up persistent questioning in support of local interests, and was a leading member of a group of MPs critical of the Government's neglect of Territorial Army and the Volunteer Forces before and during the First World War. In 1916 he served the Government as commissioner reviewing permits for aliens.

At the beginning of World War I he returned to command the local volunteers as lieutenant-colonel of the reformed 6th Battalion, the Cheshire Regiment TF. He was unfit for active service in 1914 but served as secretary to the County Committee of the Cheshire Volunteer Regiment and Staff commandant from 1916 until the force's disbandment in 1920. He was awarded a baronetcy in June 1917. Sykes resigned as an MP in 1922 but continued to be active in local party organizations. He was chairman of the Cheshire division of the National Union from 1913, of the Lancashire and Cheshire Division of the Conservative Association from 1930 to 1932, of the North West Provincial Association from 1933 to 1947, and of Knutsford Conservative Association 1922–1946. After retiring as an MP, he became involved in the bleaching business again.

Outside the Bleacher's Association, Sykes held, mostly by inheritance, a number of directorships, of which the principal one was of Williams Deacons Bank held between 1918 and 1948. Others were land holding companies and Swain & Co the newspaper group. He was Chairman of the governors of Stockport Grammar School from 1921 to 1950, Chairman of the Stockport Infirmary from 1918 to 1948, president of Manchester Northern Hospital from 1901 and chairman thereof from 1942 to 1950, chairman of the Ephraim Hallam Trust and president of the Oldham Blue Coat School. As early as 1923 he was noted as holding "more offices than he can remember" He was involved in the local government of Cheadle. For many years he was also president of the Lancashire and Cheshire Economic League and was an early supporter of the FBI and other business associations which the Bleachers' Association had helped to fund. In 1948, he succeeded the 17th Earl of Derby as Grand Superintendent of Lancashire (East Division) Provincial Grand Chapter of the Royal Arch Masons.

He remained a confirmed bachelor, with plutocratic tastes - for example yellow Rolls Royces and annual gastronomic tours of France followed by taking the waters at Vichy. Sykes was the nephew of Richard Sykes the rugby player who founded towns in America and cousin of Sir Percy Sykes the geographer and explorer of central Asia. Prior to his death he lived at South View Cheadle and was buried in the family vault at Cheadle St Mary's Parish Church graveyard

== Publications ==
- Concerning the Bleaching Industry Falkner 1925

Parliament of the United Kingdom
Preceded by Alfred John King	Member of Parliament for Knutsford; January 1910–1922	Succeeded by Ernest Makins
Baronetage of the United Kingdom
New creation	Baronet (of Cheadle); 1917–1950	Extinct
