= Percy Sykes =

British general, diplomat and scholar (1867–1945)

Sir Percy Sykes
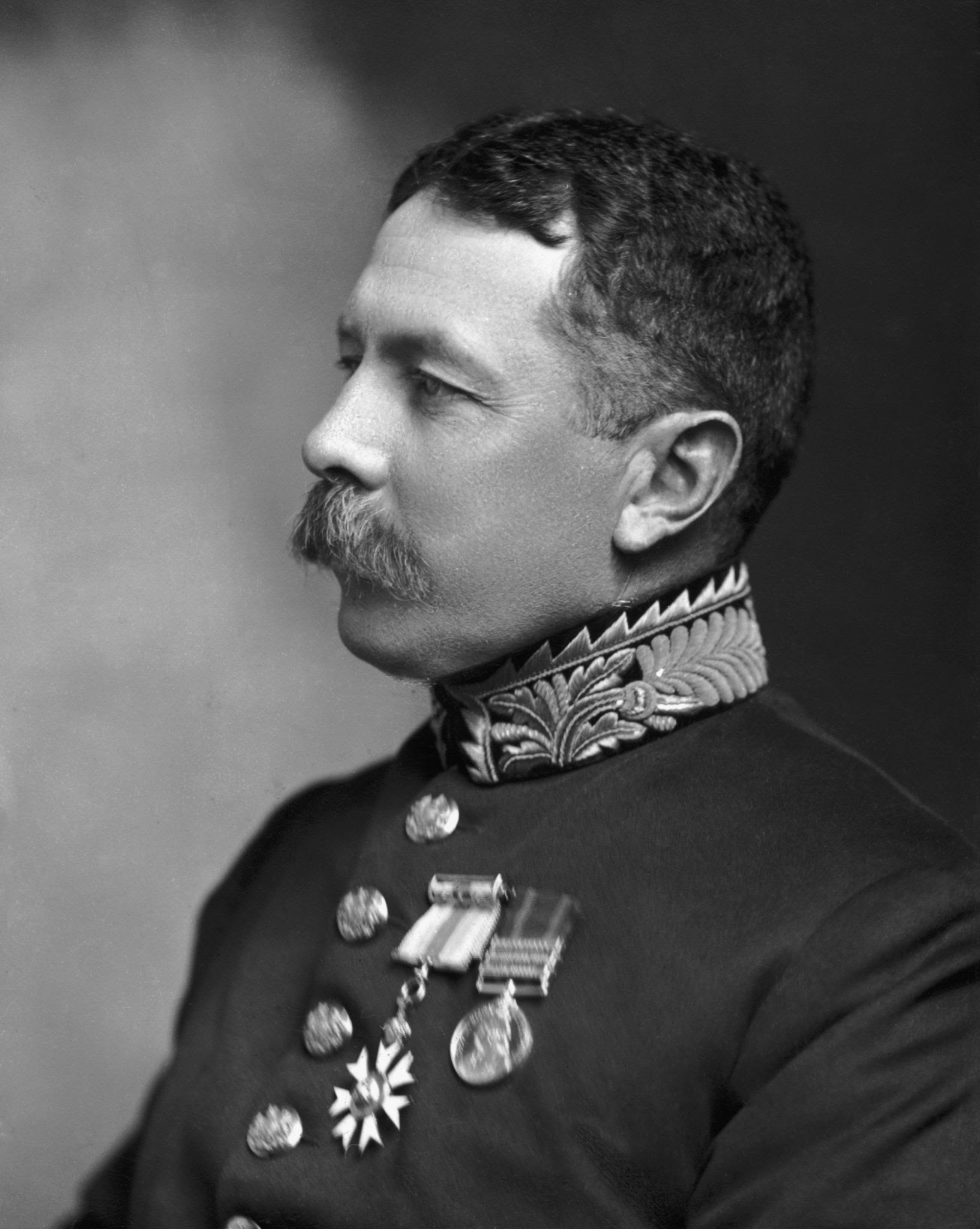
- Born: Percy Molesworth Sykes; 28 February 1867; Brompton, Kent, England
- Died: 11 June 1945 (aged 78)
- Military career
- Allegiance: United Kingdom
- Branch: British Indian Army
- Rank: Brigadier General
- Units: 16th Lancers, 2nd Dragoon Guards (Queens Bays), South Persia Rifles (commander-in-chief overall)
- Commands: Consul-General Khuzestan,
- Conflicts: Second Boer War
- Awards: Knight Commander of the Order of the Indian Empire; Companion of the Order of the Bath; Companion of the Order of St Michael and St George

Brigadier-General Sir Percy Molesworth Sykes, KCIE, CB, CMG, FRGS (28 February 1867 – 11 June 1945) was a British soldier, diplomat, and scholar with a considerable literary output. He wrote historical, geographical, and biographical works, as well as describing his travels in Persia and Central Asia.

== Early life ==
Percy Sykes was born in Brompton, Kent, England the only son of Army chaplain Rev. William Sykes (b. 1829) and his wife Mary, daughter of Captain Anthony Oliver Molesworth, of the Royal Artillery, descended from Robert Molesworth, 1st Viscount Molesworth. His sisters Ella Sykes and Ethel Sykes were both writers. His father, William was the second son of Richard Sykes, of Edgeley House, Stockport, owner of the Sykes Bleaching Company; Percy Sykes was thus the nephew of Richard Sykes the rugby player who founded towns in America, and cousin of Sir Alan Sykes, 1st Baronet who was MP for Knutsford, Cheshire.

He was educated at Rugby School and the Royal Military College, Sandhurst.

== Military career ==
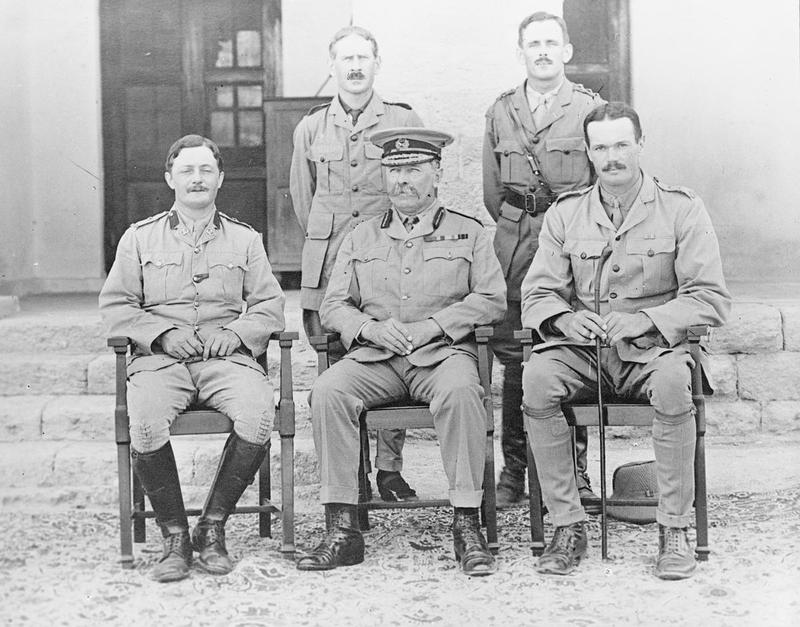
Brigadier General Sir Percy Sykes with officers of the original Mission Bandar Abbas, April 1916. (standing) Major E Howell, Captain Durham, (seated) Major G. Blair (Staff Officer) Brig General Sir Percy Sykes, Captain R.C. Ruck.

Sykes was commissioned into the 16th Lancers, but transferred to the 2nd Dragoon Guards in 1888. He was posted to India and made several journeys through Persia and Baluchistan. When he was a second lieutenant, he was elected a Fellow of the Royal Geographical Society in November 1891. He was sent on a secret mission in November 1892 when he went to Uzbekistan on the Trans-Caspian Railway. Promotion to lieutenant followed on 26 April 1895, and to captain on 8 December 1897. He was Consul at Kerman in Persia for several years in the 1890s. During the Second Boer War in South Africa he served as second in command of the 9th Battalion, Imperial Yeomanry until September 1901. He later served with the Intelligence Department and was wounded in the leg. He was appointed a Companion of the Order of St Michael and St George (CMG) in the 1902 Coronation Honours list on 26 June 1902 In late 1902 he joined the Indian Political Department, and transferred to the Indian Army. Over the next few years he made extensive journeys in the Middle East and was appointed consul-general for Khūzestān in 1906.

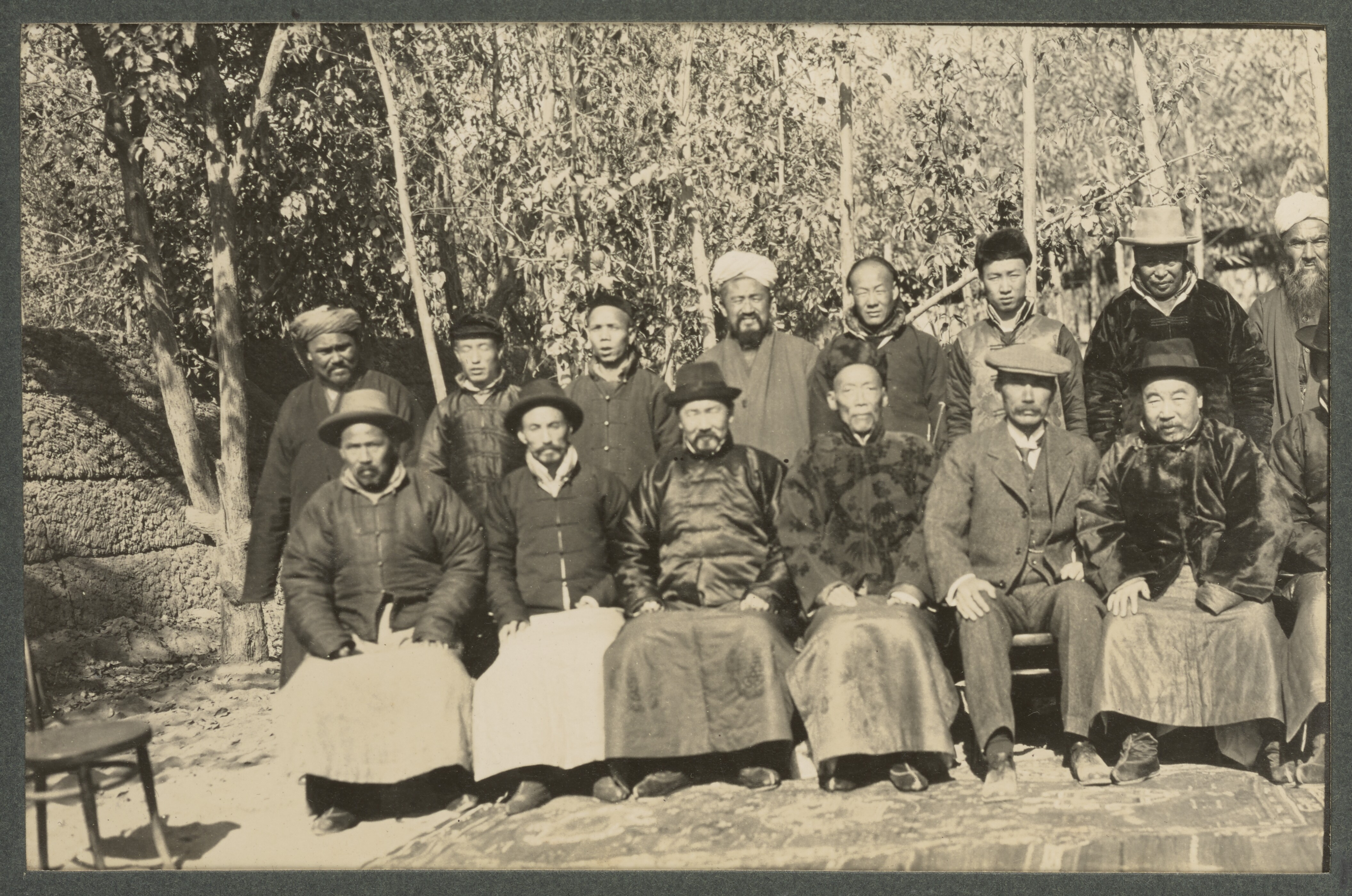
Sykes' 1915 photograph of Chinese officials and Sir George Macartney who served as Britain's Consul in Kashgar from 1890 until 1918

In 1915 Sykes was knighted. In March 1915 he was charged as acting Consul-General in Chinese Turkestan, now Xinjiang, in the Uyghur Autonomous Region of China. Sykes traveled overland from England via Norway to the capital city of Kashgar accompanied by his sister, Ella Constance Sykes, herself a Fellow of the Geographical Society and a well-regarded expert on Persia. The two recorded their journey in series of photographs and later published Through deserts and oases of Central Asia, a book which documents their nine-month journey.

While stationed in Persia he was given the temporary rank of Brigadier-General, he was placed in command of the South Persia Rifles that he raised himself. His forces, consisting of some 7,000 men, supported the Russians at Isfahan against Bakhtiaras and restored some order to the country. Once stationed at Isfahan, Sykes used numerous excuses to remain, including a supposed Russian request that the South Persia rifles be used as a garrison for Isfahan. By 1917 numerous British authorities, save Lord Curzon, were calling for his removal. Despite this, Sykes was finally recalled in 1918.

== Later life ==
Sykes retired from the army in 1924, retaining the honorary rank of Brigadier-General. From 1932 until his death he was honorary secretary of the Royal Central Asian Society, now known as the Royal Society for Asian Affairs. The society has in its gift an award called The Sir Percy Sykes Memorial Medal.

The Royal Geographical Society awarded him the Back grant in 1899 and the Patron's Medal in 1902.

== Family and legacy ==
In 1902 he married Evelyn Seton, eldest daughter of Colonel Bruce Seton of the Royal Engineers and they had six children. His daughter Rachel married Sir Patrick Reilly the diplomat.

Percy's family later introduced the "Sykes medal", awarded to those who contributed to the understanding of Persia and Central Asia.

== Publications ==
- Sykes, Sir Percy (1902). Ten Thousand Miles in Persia. John Murray.
- Sykes, Sir Percy (1910). The Glory of the Shia World. Macmillan Publishers.
- Sykes, Sir Percy (1914). Lectures delivered to the Persia Society, 1913–1914. Morrison & Gibb.
- Sykes, Sir Percy (1915). A History of Persia. MacMillan.
- "Through Deserts and Oases of Central Asia". MacMillan. 1920.
- Sykes, Sir Percy (1921). A History of Persia (2nd ed.). MacMillan.
- Sykes, Sir Percy (1922). Persia. Oxford University Press.
- Sykes, Sir Percy (1926). The Right Honourable Sir Mortimer Durand. Cassell & Co.
- Sykes, Sir Percy (1930). A History of Persia (3rd ed.). MacMillan.
- Sykes, Sir Percy (1934). A History of Exploration. George Routledge & Sons.
- Sykes, Sir Percy (1936). The Quest for Cathay. A. & C. Black.
- Sykes, Sir Percy (1938). À La Recherche du Cathay. Payot, Paris.
- Sykes, Sir Percy (1939). Explorers All, Famous Journeys in Asia. George Newnes.
- Sykes, Sir Percy (1939). Sir Percy Sykes (ed.). The Story of Exploration and Adventure. George Newnes.
- Sykes, Sir Percy (1940). A History of Afghanistan. MacMillan.
- Sykes, Sir Percy (1949). A History of Exploration. Routledge & Kegan Paul.
- Sykes, Sir Percy (1958). A History of Persia (3rd edition, with supplementary essays ed.). MacMillan.
