= Richard Sykes (rugby union) =

English rugby union player

Richard Sykes (11 May 1839 – 31 May 1923) was a pioneering rugby player who helped found two major clubs and became a landowner in North Dakota, founding five towns there.

He was the fourth son of Richard Sykes, owner of the Sykes Bleaching Company, and his wife Jane Hardcastle. He was born at Edgeley House, Stockport, Cheshire, and was known as Dick. He went to Rugby School in Rugby, Warwickshire where he was Captain of Rugby in 1857. The following extract is from the First 125 years Liverpool Football Club Rugby Union 1857–1982 by I R A Daglish.

In the Autumn of 1857, Frank Albert Mather, who had recently left Rugby School, wrote to his friend Richard Sykes the Captain of Football at Rugby School inviting him to take part in a game of football in Liverpool and bring with him one of the balls in use at the school, made by Linden a Rugby bootmaker. The game was arranged for Saturday 19 December 1857 on the Liverpool Cricket Ground at Edgehill. Fifty players arrived and they decided to play Rugby versus the World. Liverpool club was founded there and then.

Dick Sykes spent 18 months in Heidelberg, Paris and Geneva. He returned to England and helped to form the Manchester Football Club in 1860, being the club's first Captain. He was a partner in a textile firm in Manchester 'Callender, Sykes & Mather' until it failed in 1878. Then he went to America and over the years acquired considerable land holdings. He continued to live in England, but made annual trips to the States where he founded and named five North Dakota towns,

- Sykeston, after his family
- Bowdon, after his hometown
- Edgeley, after his birthplace
- Chaseley, after the English home of an old friend
- Alfred, "because it was a good English name".

He introduced rugby football to colleges and universities in the west of America and also introduced golf links to the northwest

In 1904, at the age of 65 he married Fanny Elizabeth Walton of Broughton, Salford, and sailed for the United States on their wedding day to make their future home, settling at Montecito, California. They had two sons. Sykes was the brother of Thomas Hardcastle Sykes and uncle of Sir Alan Sykes, 1st Baronet MP for Knutsford, Cheshire, and Sir Percy Sykes the geographer and explorer of central Asia.
