= Sykes Bleaching Company =

The Sykes Bleaching Company
- Formerly: E & R Sykes (earlier partnership)
- Company type: Limited liability company (since 1892)
- Industry: Textile
- Incorporated: 1892
- Founded: 1792
- Founder: William Sykes
- Headquarters: Edgeley, Stockport, England, United Kingdom
- Area served: United Kingdom
- Key people: Edmund Sykes; Richard Sykes; Thomas Hardcastle Sykes, Alan "Jack" Sykes
- Products: Bleached cotton cloth
- Services: Cotton bleaching and finishing
- Parent: Bleachers Association (since June 1900)

The Sykes Bleaching Company was a cotton bleaching business established in Edgeley, near Stockport in 1792 which grew to become one of the largest bleaching enterprises in the United Kingdom.

== Origins ==
The bleaching business was established in 1792 by William Sykes. Sykes had been born at Wakefield and had been active in the cloth industry at Halifax and Manchester. On 27 November 1792 an advertisement appeared in the Manchester Mercury to let land at Edgeley, Stockport, Cheshire as

An Eligible situation for Bleach Ground or Print Field in which there are a number of Fine White Sand Springs with a Rivulet capable of Turning Wash Wheels etc. The Grounds lie very contiguous to the populous Manufacturing Town of Stockport where Bleachers and Printers are both much wanted and every encouragement will be given to a good tenant

William Sykes took the land, first renting, but later purchasing it, and built a bleach works. To bleach cloth, it was repeatedly steeped in natural alkaline solutions derived from ash, called "bucking". It was then washed and exposed to sun and air by being hung out in the bleachfields (known as "crofts"). After being immersed in buttermilk, called ‘souring’ it received final washing, stretching and drying. The process could take up to eight months and with cloth in the open, a watchman was employed to guard Sykes crofts at night. Theft of cloth from a croft was an offence liable to capital punishment. Handloom weavers from Edgeley, Stockport, Adswood, Cheadle and Cheadle Hulme brought cloth to the works for bleaching and these were sold on to Manchester and London merchants. An early list of Sykes customers includes well-known names as Oldknow of Nottingham, Radcliffe of Stockport (a pioneer of the fine muslin industry) and Cadbury of Birmingham, a silk mercer and father of the founder of the well-known chocolate firm. The list also mentions names of customers as far afield as Boston, Massachusetts America and Messina Italy.

When Sykes settled in Stockport, there were few trees in the area. As wood was needed in the drying process, he undertook extensive tree-planting on land which later became public property in Alexandra Park. He built a "stately house" Edgeley House, which was the home of the family for succeeding generations. The works were originally driven by water power, but in 1803 the works was provided with a 12 horse-power steam engine. By 1804 new chemical methods had been introduced using calcium hypochlorite which eliminated the need for grassing the cloth in the fields but required more water.

== Expansion ==
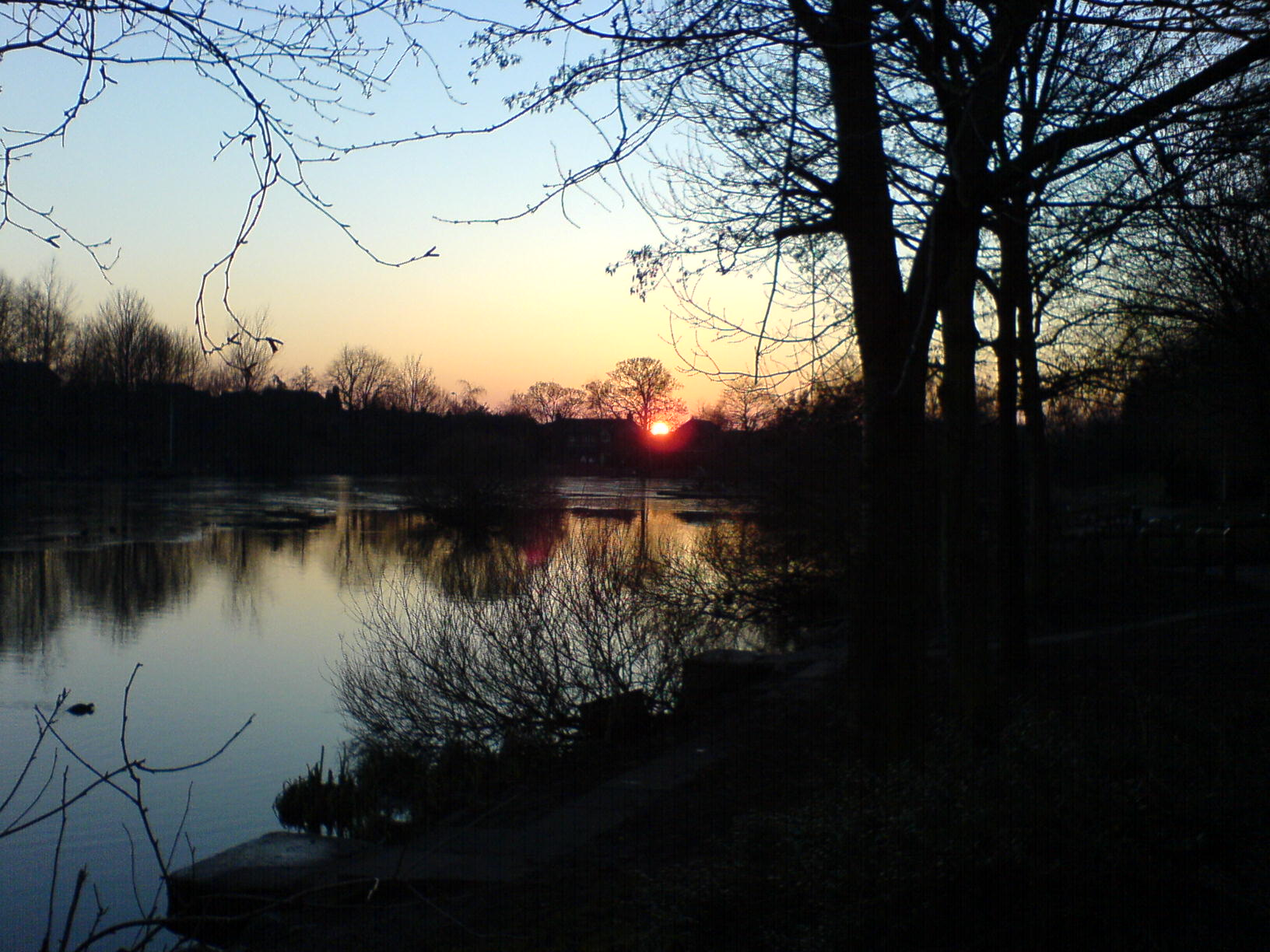
Sunset over Sykes' Reservoir, January 2006.

Edmund Sykes succeeded his father in the business some time before 1809. In 1812, Luddite demonstrators attacked the works and threatened the Sykes family in their home until they were dispersed by the militia. Edmund Sykes employed Pickfords and other proprietors of stage-wagons to distribute the wares. In 1820, Edmund's younger brother Richard joined the business which was then carried on under the name of E & R Sykes. In 1828 Edmund Sykes retired from the business and went to live at Mansfield Woodhouse, Nottinghamshire. Under Richard Sykes' ownership, the business at Edgeley developed rapidly and every effort was made to modernise the plant. Wells were sunk including the "Silver Well" was sunk, and by 1830 these had quadrupled the water supply. Reservoirs were also built. These undertakings were of great value to people in the area in times of excessive drought. Richard Sykes also took a keen interest in public affairs. He was justice of the peace for Cheshire, alderman for Stockport, and mayor in 1850–1851. He was an active member of the Society of Bleachers. Sykes and Co were interested in the use of science in the bleaching industry, and their books include exhaustive tests made by them comparing different manufacturer's bleach. They also employed John Dalton, the chemist, as consultant on the quality of their water supply. Richard Sykes died in 1876 and his son Thomas Hardcastle Sykes succeeded to the business, undertaking speculative ventures at home and overseas.

== Bleachers Association ==
Sykes became a limited liability company in 1892 but management remained in the family including Thomas Sykes' son, Alan, known as Jack. However, there was severe internal competition within the bleaching trade, which discouraged long-term investment, so the business did not develop the technical and scientific knowledge as much as foreign. As a result, the Bleacher's Association was created in June 1900, amalgamating around 60 businesses in bleaching and finishing of cotton goods. These were mainly in Lancashire to exploit the monopoly of water supply, but included some in Scotland and Northern Ireland. Jack Sykes became one of its original directors together with his cousin Frank Sykes, the son of Edmund. After the retirement of Thomas Sykes, Jack continued the management of the Edgeley works following the longer-term interests of the Association, through a cautious financial policy. After its formation, the Bleacher's Association continued to buy up its competitors and to make trade-sharing agreements with the Calico Printers and Bradford Dyers. Between 1901 and 1910 nine works were purchased and a further 21 works were purchased after World War I. The Association opened its new headquarters, Blackfriars House, in 1926, and its silver jubilee was commemorated by the publication of Jack Sykes's "Concerning the Bleaching Industry". However the success of the Bleacher's Association, in maintaining high profits on a declining volume of trade, could not last. Prices were reduced in 1928 and from then on trade was severely restricted by the long term decline in export of British textiles.
