= Joseph Bell DeRemer House =

Historic house in North Dakota, United States

- U.S. National Register of Historic Places
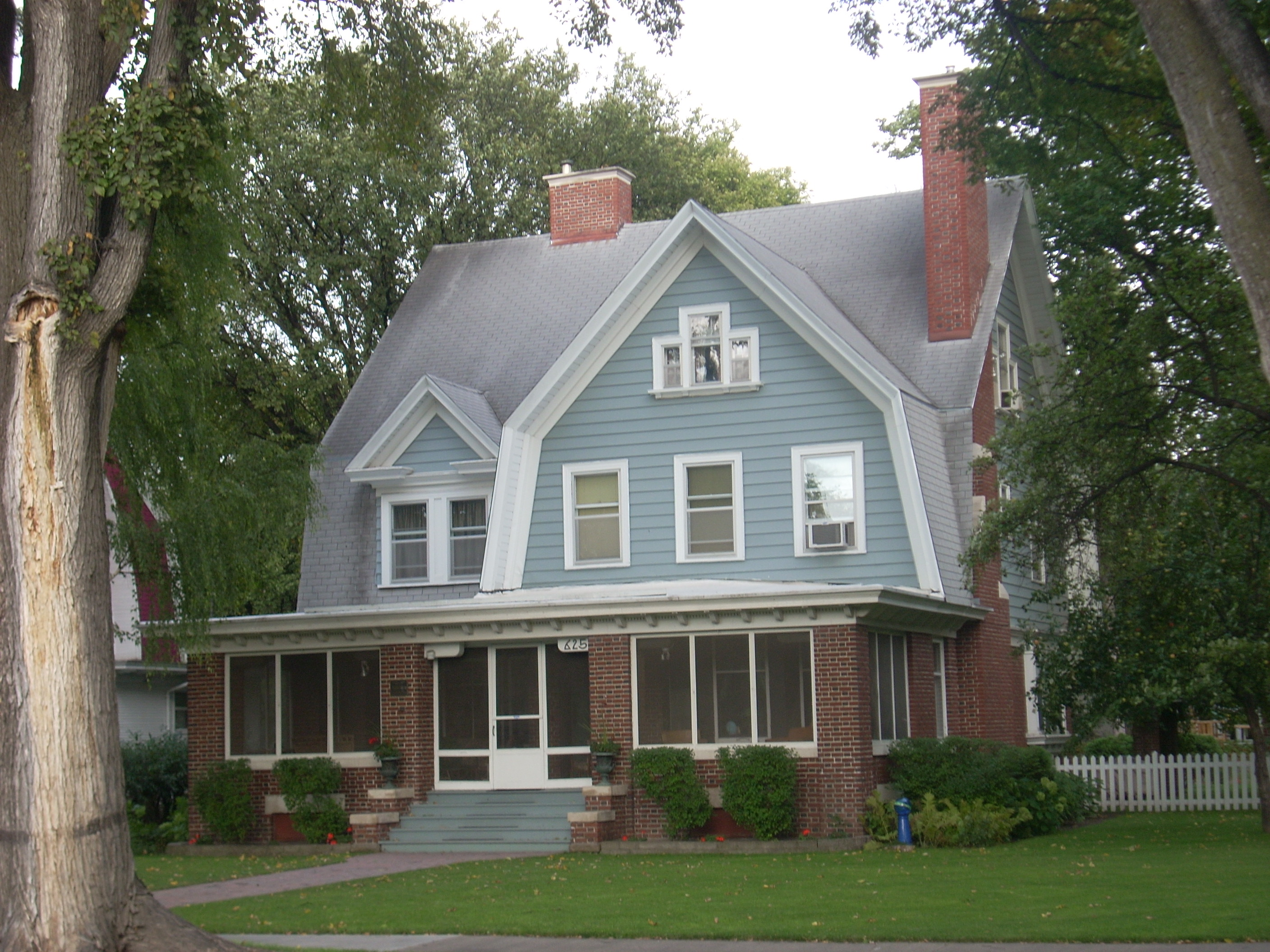

- Location within North Dakota Location within the United States
- Location: 625 Belmont Rd., Grand Forks, North Dakota
- Coordinates: 47°54′57″N 97°1′42″W
- Area: less than one acre
- Built: 1906
- Architect: Joseph Bell DeRemer
- Architectural style: Dutch Colonial Revival
- NRHP reference No.: 83001933
- Added to NRHP: June 9, 1983

The Joseph Bell DeRemer House is a Dutch Colonial Revival style house located on Belmont Road in the Near Southside Historic District of Grand Forks, North Dakota, United States. The house was built in 1906 for the architect Joseph Bell DeRemer, who designed the home himself. As an example of a middle-class house the structure is remarkable for details and quality associated with the public and commercial buildings designed by the DeRemer firm.

The exterior of the house features a red brick Flemish bond porch and chimney stacks; the second story was originally finished in stucco, but has been redone with metal siding. It has a gambrel roof and dormers. Trim includes friezes, bracketing, and dentilled wood running courses. A brick pergola, designed to match the house, is located on the southeast.

Interior details are generally classical with dentilled ceiling moldings, pilaster strips, and frieze. Each room has a uniquely designed parquet floor. Various Craftsmen, and Art Moderne details can also be found in the house.

== Joseph Bell DeRemer ==
Joseph Bell DeRemer (1871–1944) was one of the finest architects in North Dakota. Some of the important works produced by DeRemer or his firm, under the leadership of his son Samuel Teel DeRemer, include the President's House at the University of North Dakota, the Masonic Temple, and the Art Moderne United Lutheran Church and North Dakota State Capitol skyscraper. Joseph DeRemer also designed houses in the Grand Forks Near Southside Historic District, most notably the Tudor Revival house presently located at 521 South Sixth Street off Reeves Drive.
