= Joseph Bell DeRemer =

American architect

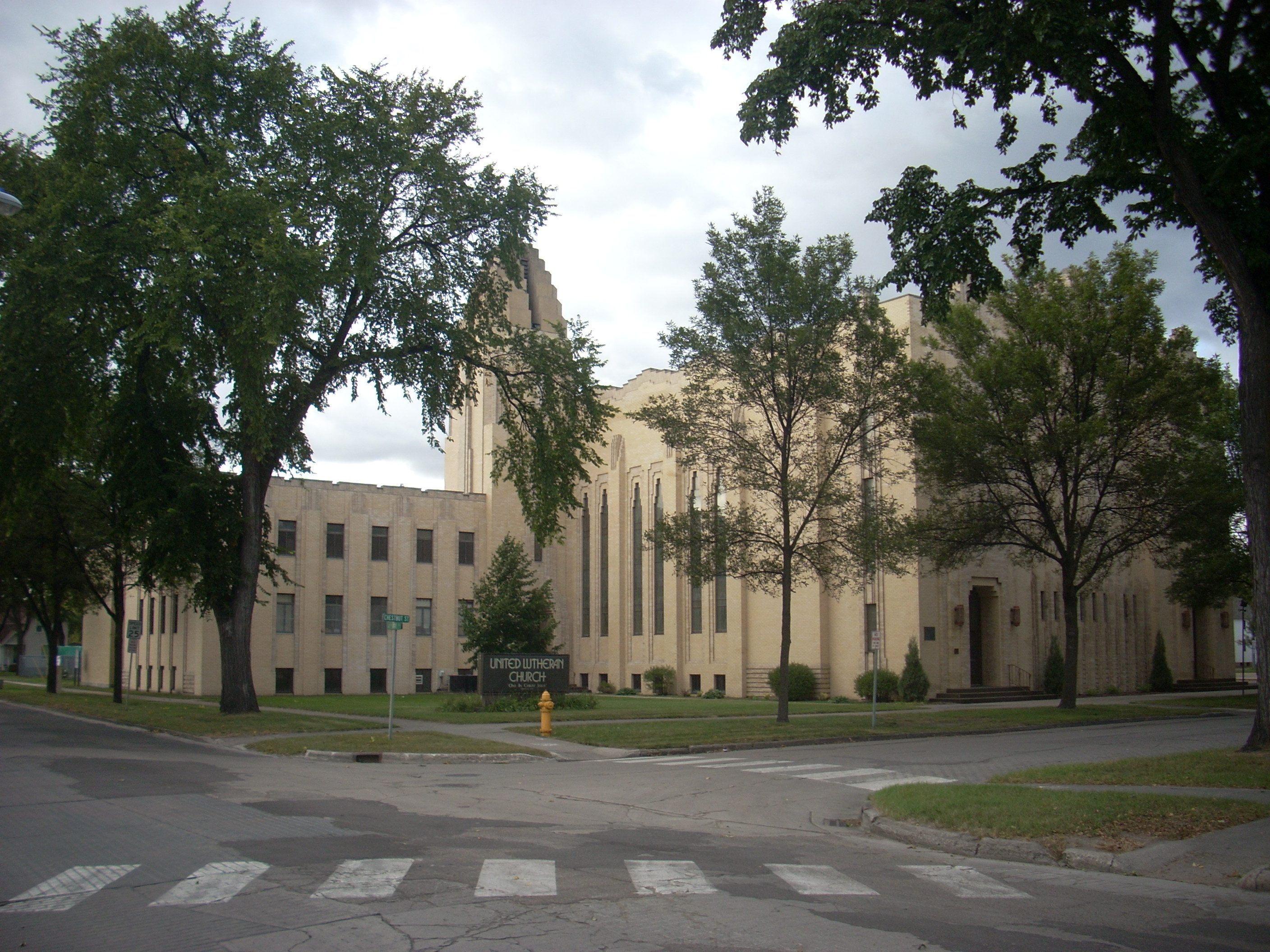
United Lutheran Church, 1931-1941

Joseph Bell DeRemer (1871–1944), who lived and worked in Grand Forks, North Dakota, was one of the finest architects in North Dakota. Some of the important works produced by him or his firm, which included his son Samuel Teel DeRemer, include the President's House at the University of North Dakota, the Masonic Temple, and the Art Moderne United Lutheran Church and North Dakota State Capitol skyscraper. Joseph DeRemer also designed houses in the Grand Forks Near Southside Historic District, most notably the Tudor Revival house presently located at 521 South Sixth Street off Reeves Drive. According to the North Dakota State Archives, “A favorite of Joseph's was Tudor Revival, a style he used not only during his first period in Grand Forks, but until his retirement in 1937. Examples of his work in this style include the house that he designed for his brother, Sam Teel Deremer, in 1926 (which was later demolished). This house that also exemplifies the smaller homes designed by the DeRemers, which include a small number of Tudor Revival style homes, Craftsman (or California) bungalows, and small modern style houses.” Unfortunately, most of the Tudor Revival homes designed by Joseph Deremer were demolished; however, the circa 1928 Tudor Revival beauty at 521 S. 6th Street has been meticulously preserved after it was moved from the Lincoln Park neighborhood in the aftermath of the horrendous 1997 Red River Flood. His significant works include a number of buildings that are listed on the U.S. National Register of Historic Places.

== Personal life ==
Joseph Bell DeRemer was born in New Jersey on September 14, 1871, and studied one year at Columbia University. He married Elizabeth M. DeRemer (1872 - February 10, 1965) in New Jersey. They were the parents of Samuel Teel DeRemer. He died on February 16, 1944, in Grand Forks and was buried in Memorial Park Cemetery in Grand Forks, North Dakota. His wife and son were later buried next to him.

The DeRemers also had a daughter, Dolores, who was a pianist and married William Pendry Bidelman. The DeRemers raised their grandson, William Pendry Bidelman, who became an astronomer.

== Samuel Teel DeRemer ==
Samuel Teel DeRemer was born May 15, 1894, in New Jersey and died September 18, 1967, in Bemidji, Minnesota. He joined his father Joseph Bell DeRemer's architectural practice in 1920.

== Works ==
Works by Joseph Bell DeRemer by year include:

- Oxford House, University of North Dakota campus, 1902
- St. Paul's Episcopal Church, 404 DeSmet St., now 312 2nd Ave., S.W;, Rugby, North Dakota
- New Hampshire Apartments, 105 N. 3rd St., Grand Forks, North Dakota, 1904
- George B. Clifford House, 406 Reeves Dr., Grand Forks, North Dakota, first floor redesign and addition, 1906
- Joseph Bell DeRemer House, 625 Belmont Rd., Grand Forks, North Dakota, 1906
- North Dakota Museum of Art, University of North Dakota campus, 1907
- Gustafson Hall, University of North Dakota campus, 1908
- Babcock Hall, University of North Dakota campus, 1908
- Dickinson (Carnegie Area) Public Library, 139 3rd St. W., Dickinson, North Dakota
- Franklin School, 308 Second St. SW, Jamestown, North Dakota
- One or more properties included in Grand Forks Near Southside Historic District, Roughly bounded by ND 697, Red River, 13th Ave. and Cottonwood St., Grand Forks, North Dakota
- Masonic Temple, 413-421 Bruce Ave, 1913
- St. Catherine's Church of Lomice, North Dakota, 4 mi. W and 2 mi. S of jct. ND 35 and Cty Rte 15 Whitman, North Dakota
- K. J. Taralseth Company, 427 N. Main St. Warren, Minnesota
- Merrifield Hall, University of North Dakota campus, 1929
- United Lutheran Church, 324 Chestnut St. (with his son Samuel T. DeRemer), 1931–41
- B'nai Israel Synagogue, Grand Forks, North Dakota, 1937
