= List of mayors of Grand Forks, North Dakota =

The following is a list of the Mayors of Grand Forks, North Dakota.

== Mayors ==
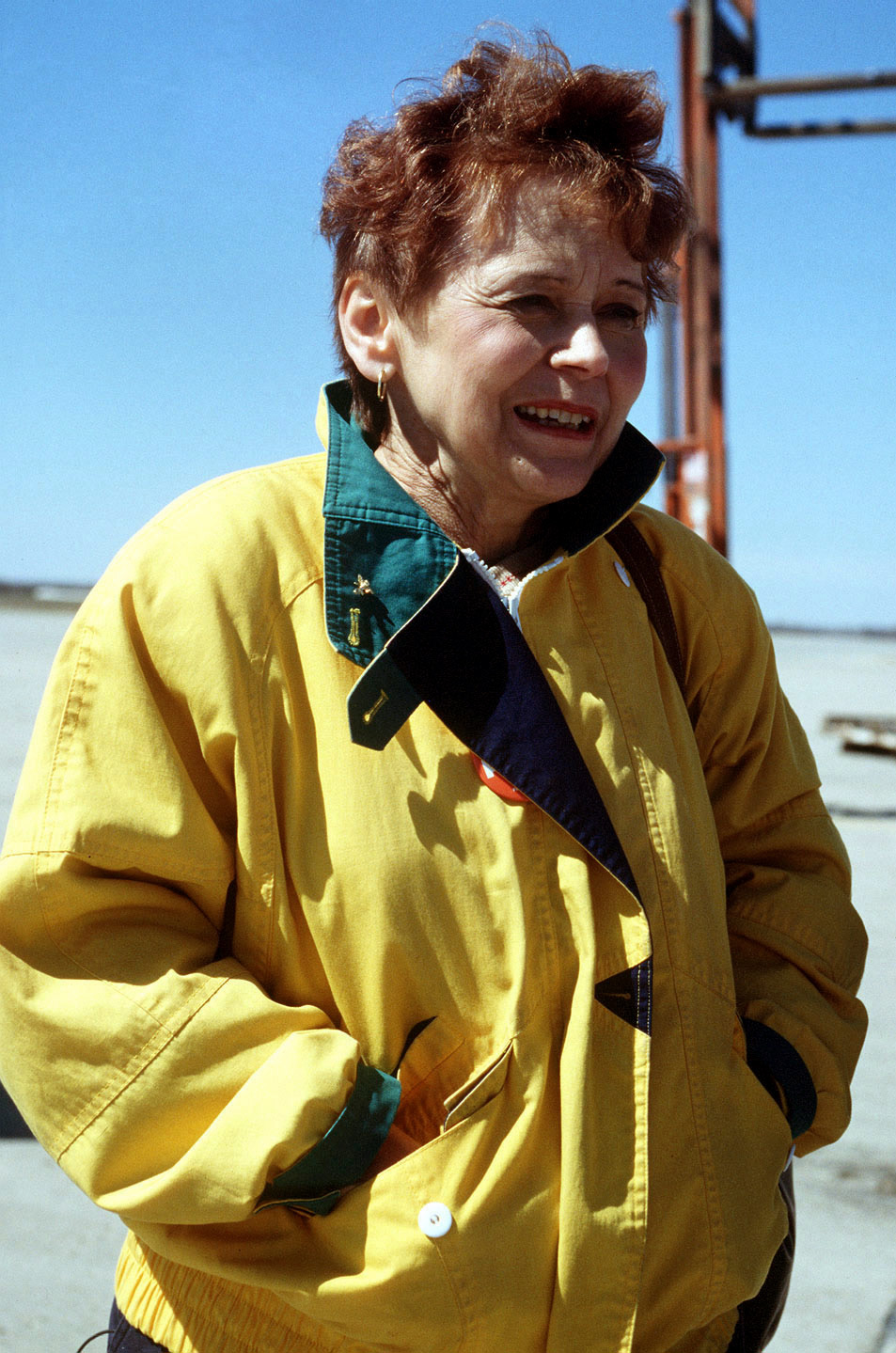
Mayor Patricia "Pat" Owens

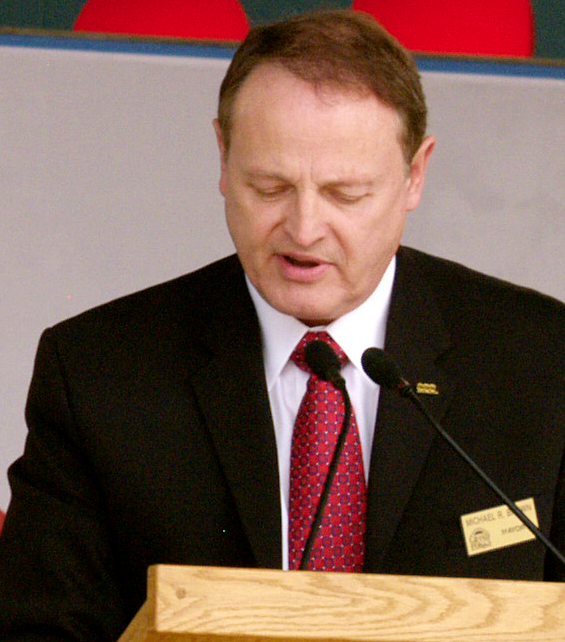
Mayor Michael R. Brown

Term	Mayor
1881–1882	Col. W.H. Brown
1882–1884	M.L. McCormack
1885	J.S. Eshelman
1886–1887	D.M. Holmes
1888–1889	Alexander Griggs
1889–1893	H.L. Whithed
1894–1896	W.J. Anderson
1896–1904	John Dinnie
1904–1908	George Duis
1908–1910	Dr. John Taylor
1910–1914	M.F. Murray
1914–1918	James A. Dinnie
1918–1920	Dr. Henry Wheeler
1920	Grand Forks converts to city commission style of government
1920–1926	Henry O'Keefe Jr. (president of city commissioners)
1926–1934	John Hulteng (president of city commissioners)
1934–1940	E.A. Fladland (president of city commissioners)
1940–1944	T.H.H. Thoreson
1944	return of mayor/alderman system
1944–1952	Harold Boe
1952–1960	Oscar Lunseth
1960–1964	Nelson Youngs
1964–1972	Hugo Magnuson
1972–1980	C.P. O'Neill
1980–1988	H.C. Bud Wessman
1988–1996	Michael Polovitz
1996–2000	Patricia Owens
2000–2020	Michael R. Brown
2020–present	Brandon Bochenski
