= Oxford House (disambiguation) =

Oxford House may refer to:

- Oxford House, a system of drug rehabilitation shelter/halfway houses
- Oxford House (Grand Forks, North Dakota), listed on the NRHP in North Dakota
- Oxford House, Manitoba, First Nations Cree community in Canada
- Oxford House, Hong Kong, an office tower within the TaiKoo Place complex in Hong Kong
- Oxford House (settlement) in Bethnal Green, London
