= South Junior High School =

South Junior High School may refer to:

- South Junior High School (Anaheim, California)
- South Junior High School (Quincy, Massachusetts), listed on the National Register of Historic Places
- South Junior High School (Niagara Falls, New York), listed on the National Register
- South Junior High School (Grand Forks, North Dakota), listed on the National Register
