= Ramsey County Sheriff's House =

Historic house in North Dakota, United States

- U.S. National Register of Historic Places
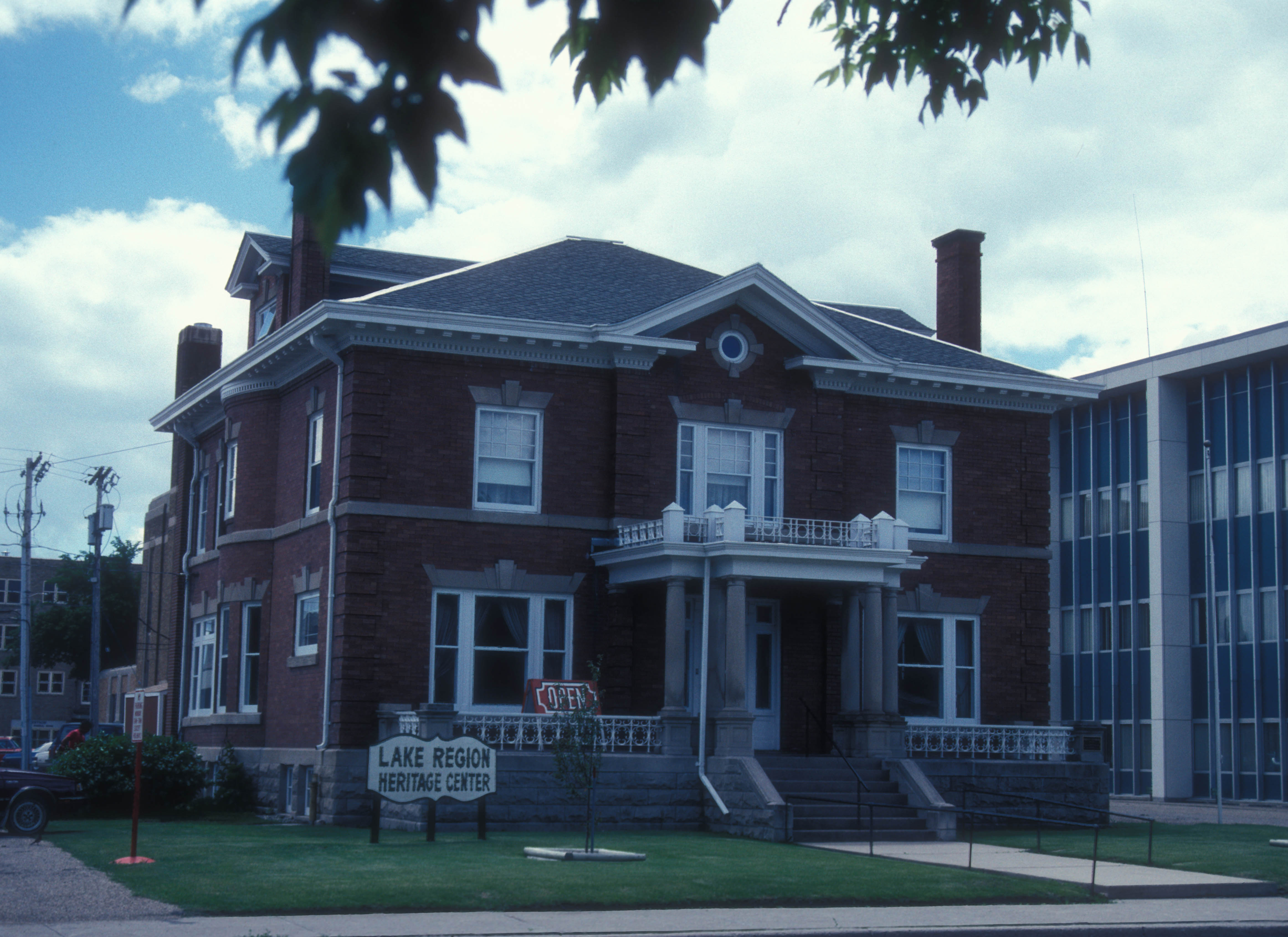

- Location within North Dakota Location within the United States
- Location: 420 6th St., Devils Lake, North Dakota
- Coordinates: 48.11356°N 98.85944°W
- Area: less than one acre
- Built: 1909–1911
- Built by: Dinnie Bros.
- Architect: Haxby & Gillespie
- Architectural style: Colonial Revival, Georgian Revival
- NRHP reference No.: 78003452
- Added to NRHP: January 31, 1978

The Ramsey County Sheriff's Office was designed by Haxby & Gillespie and was built in 1909 by the Dinnie Brothers. Also known as Lake Region Heritage Center, it was listed on the National Register of Historic Places in 1978.

It is "a well-preserved example of Georgian Revival architecture" and is deemed significant "for its original long-term use as the official residence of the sheriffs of Ramsey County." From 1974 on it served as a cultural center.
