= Michael Brown (mayor) =

American politician

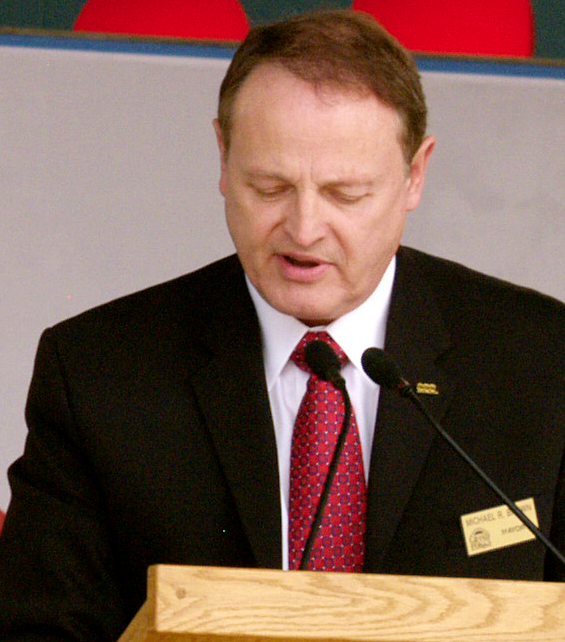

26th Mayor of Grand Forks
- In office 2000–2020
- Preceded by: Pat Owens
- Succeeded by: Brandon Bochenski

Personal details
- Born: Albuquerque, New Mexico, U.S.
- Education: Baylor University (BS, MA); University of North Dakota (MD)

Military service
- Branch/service: United States Air Force
- Rank: Lieutenant colonel

Michael R. Brown is an American politician and doctor who served as the 26th mayor of Grand Forks, North Dakota from 2000 to 2020.

== Early life and education ==
Brown was born in Albuquerque, New Mexico, the son of a United States Air Force jet mechanic. He spent his childhood in Japan and England before returning to New Mexico. Brown earned a Bachelor of Science and Master of Arts degree from Baylor University before joining the United States Air Force, where he served in the intercontinental ballistic missile (ICBM) community. He served as a Deputy ICBM Launch Control Officer, ICBM Launch Control Officer Commander and ICBM Launch Control Officer Instructor. He was stationed in Grand Forks, and earned a Doctor of Medicine from the University of North Dakota School of Medicine and Health Sciences. He became a lieutenant colonel.

== Career ==
Brown is an obstetrician at Altru Health System in Grand Forks.

He was first elected mayor in 2000 and reelected in 2004, 2008, 2012, and 2016.

In 2007, Brown was appointed to the advisory board of the Federal Emergency Management Agency. After the June 9, 2020, election, Brown was succeeded as mayor by Kazakhstani-American National Hockey League player Brandon Bochenski.

Political offices
Preceded by Pat Owens	Mayor of Grand Forks; 2000–2020	Succeeded by Brandon Bochenski
