= K. J. Taralseth Company =

- U.S. National Register of Historic Places
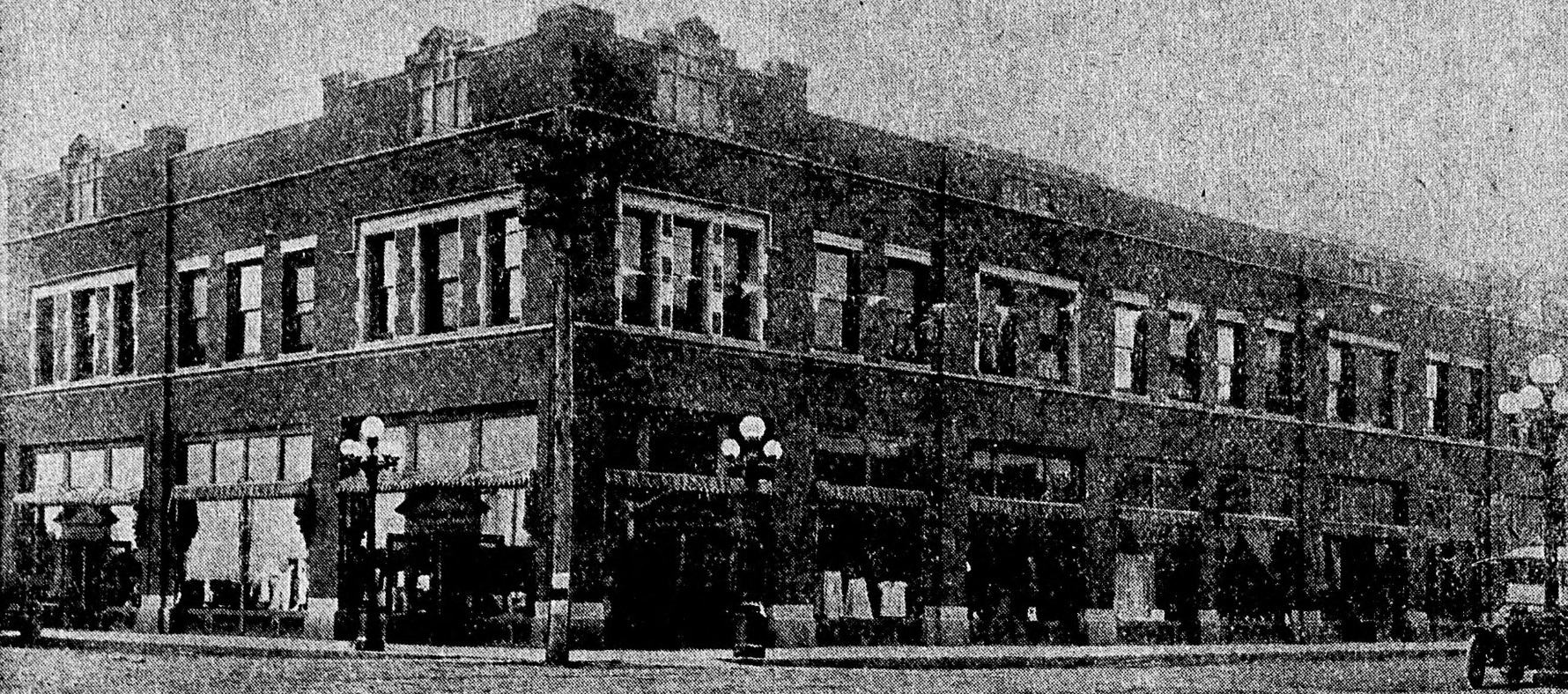
- The K. J. Taralseth Company building in 1915

- Location within Minnesota Location within the United States
- Location: 427 North Main Street, Warren, Minnesota
- Coordinates: 48°11′47″N 96°46′24″W
- Area: Less than one acre
- Built: 1911
- Built by: Joseph Bell DeRemer
- Architectural style: Tudor Revival
- NRHP reference No.: 02000938
- Designated: September 6, 2002

The K. J. Taralseth Company was a prominent retail business in Warren, Minnesota, United States, in operation 1888–1959. The original building it occupied burned down in 1910, so the owners commissioned a new building the following year which is still standing. Both facilities contained the department store as well as space for other tenants—including a Masonic temple—and hosted numerous community events. The 1911 building in which the K. J. Taralseth Company was housed for almost half a century was listed on the National Register of Historic Places in 2002 for having local significance in the theme of commerce. It was nominated for representing a business and a venue that served a central role in the life of the community.

== History ==
On May 31, 1882, Knud J. Taralseth opened a general store in a false-front frame building on Main Street in Warren. Taralseth, a Norwegian immigrant, had spent ten years in the United States before arriving in Warren. He worked as a carpenter for railroads in Red Wing and Minneapolis.

Taralseth entered business by purchasing a half interest in a small store in Osakis, Minnesota, in 1878. He moved with his family to Warren in 1882 and began a mercantile business. In 1888 Warren's growing population prompted Taralseth to move the business to another location in town. He purchased property on the corner of Main Street and Johnson Avenue and erected the first two-story building in the city. The new brick-veneered building not only accommodated merchandise but also housed the Warren Masonic Lodge and the post office.

In the late nineteenth century the Taralseth Store offered items such as dry goods, clothing, hats, shoes, and groceries, and was organized as a department store. People regarded it as the finest general store on the Great Northern road between Crookston and Winnipeg. By 1904, Taralseth's store had been incorporated as the K. J. Taralseth Company. Taralseth's sons, Ralph and Olaf, served on the board and as managers. One year later, K.J. Taralseth died at the age of fifty-six. It was then that Ralph came forward to lead the family business.

Disaster struck the store on October 24, 1910, when a fire swept through the Taralseth Building. The fire, which began in the basement, destroyed the building and most of the merchandise inside. The financial loss was estimated at $125,000. It was the biggest loss in the history of Warren. Immediately after the fire, the Taralseth family decided to rebuild the store. During the interim, they sold merchandise in several locations throughout town.

On October 12, 1911, the new two-story brick Taralseth building opened its doors. The establishment employed a sales team of about fifteen people and offered a variety of adult and children's clothing, groceries, and hardware. In an effort to attract customers and challenge the competition, store managers changed the display windows weekly. Furthermore, the Taralseths relied heavily on advertising through mailings and advertisements in newspapers. The local newspaper Warren Sheaf boasted that the store was the equal of any in the Twin Cities.

The Taralseths' store was not the only entity the building was known for. As one of the largest, most significant buildings of the town, it housed several other businesses and offices. Local officials and businessmen had offices in the building. The Warren Commercial Club and the local Masonic lodge held suites as well. The building hosted many social events. The Masonic lodge upstairs held dances for the young people of the area. The holiday season provided special events for children. The basement of the building was converted into a toy emporium during Christmas time. Store employees were known to dress as Santa Claus and distribute treats to the youngsters.

In addition to owning the premier mercantile establishment in Warren, the Taralseths were also active civically. Knud helped establish school districts and served on a board of education. Ralph served as both mayor and fire chief for many years.

In 1938 larger stores began competing with the Taralseth store and sales steadily declined for two decades. In 1959 the Taralseths sold their business. Afterward the building housed apartments and small businesses until it was abandoned in the mid 1970s. In 2001 a rehabilitation project began, and the building was once again converted to apartments with business suites on the lower level.

== See also ==
- National Register of Historic Places listings in Marshall County, Minnesota
