= Pat Owens =

American politician (1941–2024)

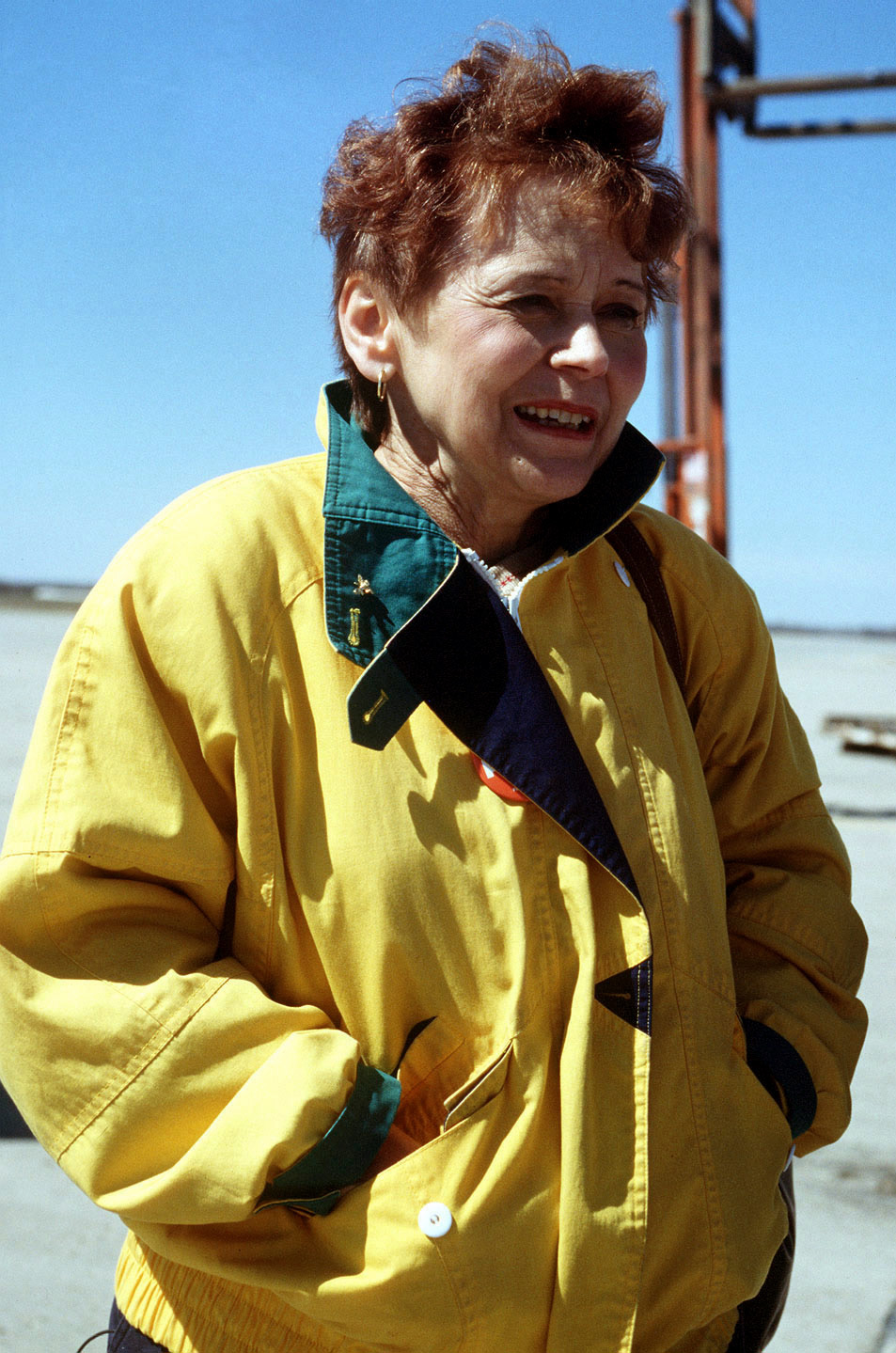
- Owens at Grand Forks Air Force Base in April 1997

25th Mayor of Grand Forks, North Dakota
- In office 1996–2000
- Preceded by: Michael Polovitz
- Succeeded by: Michael Brown

Personal details
- Born: Patricia A. Owens; March 17, 1941 East Grand Forks, Minnesota, U.S.
- Died: July 23, 2024 (aged 83)
- Spouse: Bobby Owens

Patrica A. Owens (March 17, 1941 – July 23, 2024) was an American politician who was the mayor of Grand Forks, North Dakota, during the flood that devastated the city in April 1997. She actively lobbied then-president Bill Clinton for funds to rebuild the city and construct a permanent flood protection system for the city and neighboring East Grand Forks, Minnesota.

== Political career ==
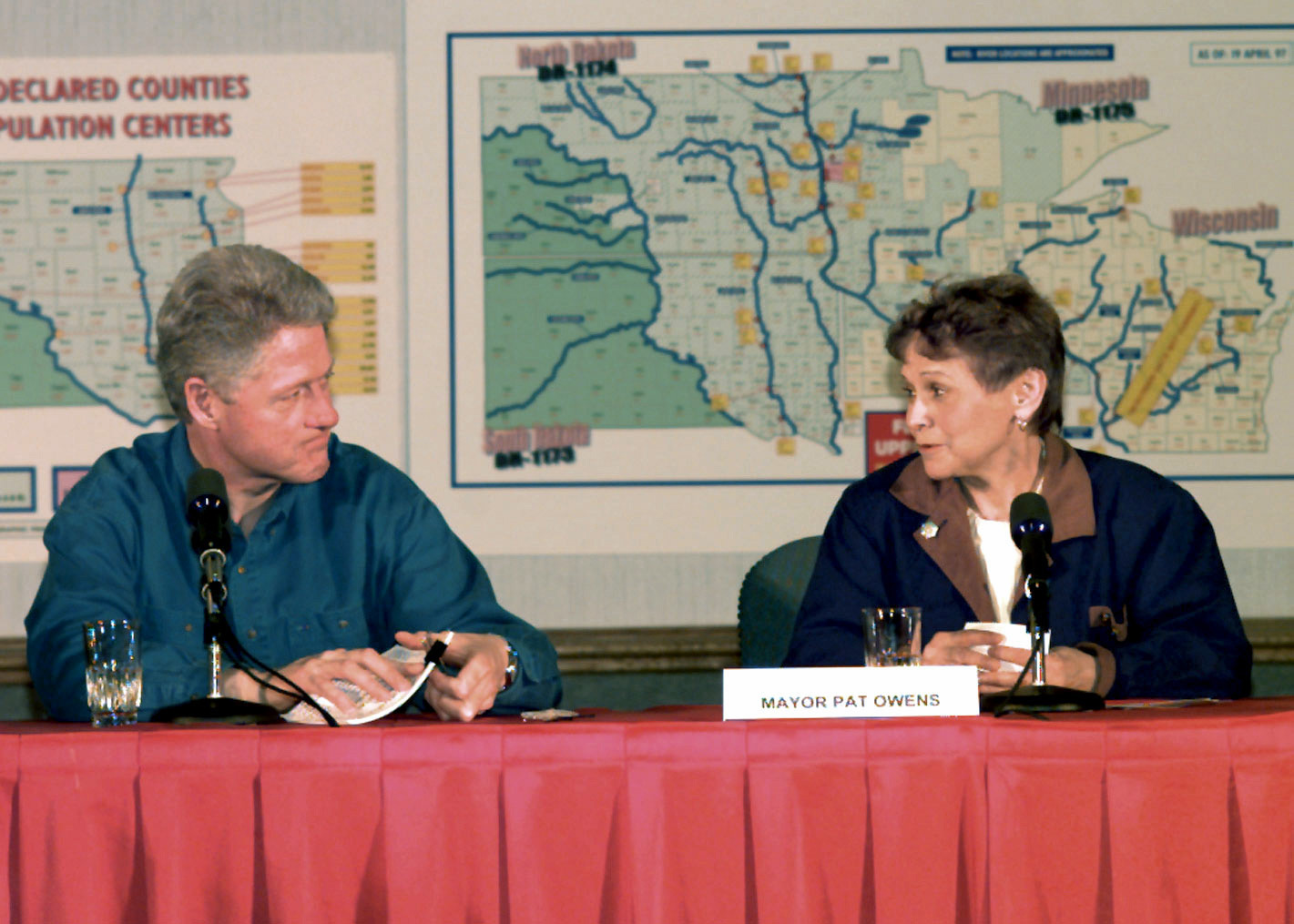
Owens with President Bill Clinton in 1997

Owens, born in 1941 in East Grand Forks, Minnesota, worked as the mayor's executive assistant for 33 years, before running for mayor herself in 1996. She received 76% of the vote and became Grand Forks' first female mayor. Then in 1997, after less than one year as mayor, the city was struck by the 1997 Red River Flood. She received numerous awards and national recognition for her efforts after the flood. She ran for a second term in 2000, but was defeated by Michael Brown. Also in 2000, Owens was a member of the Mayors' Campaign Against Breast Cancer.

== Retirement and death ==
Owens resided in Ocala, Florida, where she moved in 2001. That same year, she was awarded an honorary Doctor of Letters degree from the University of North Dakota. In 2004 when Florida was struck by a string of hurricanes, she was asked by the Federal Emergency Management Agency (FEMA) to act as an ambassador for them by trying to help give the victims some sort of hope. However, she was unable to as the retirement development had been damaged by two of the hurricanes that hit the state.

Owens died on July 23, 2024, at the age of 83.

== See also ==
- List of mayors of Grand Forks, North Dakota
- 1997 Red River Flood in the United States

Political offices
Preceded by Michael Polovitz	Mayor of Grand Forks; 1996–2000	Succeeded by Michael Brown
