= Dinnie Apartments =

- U.S. National Register of Historic Places
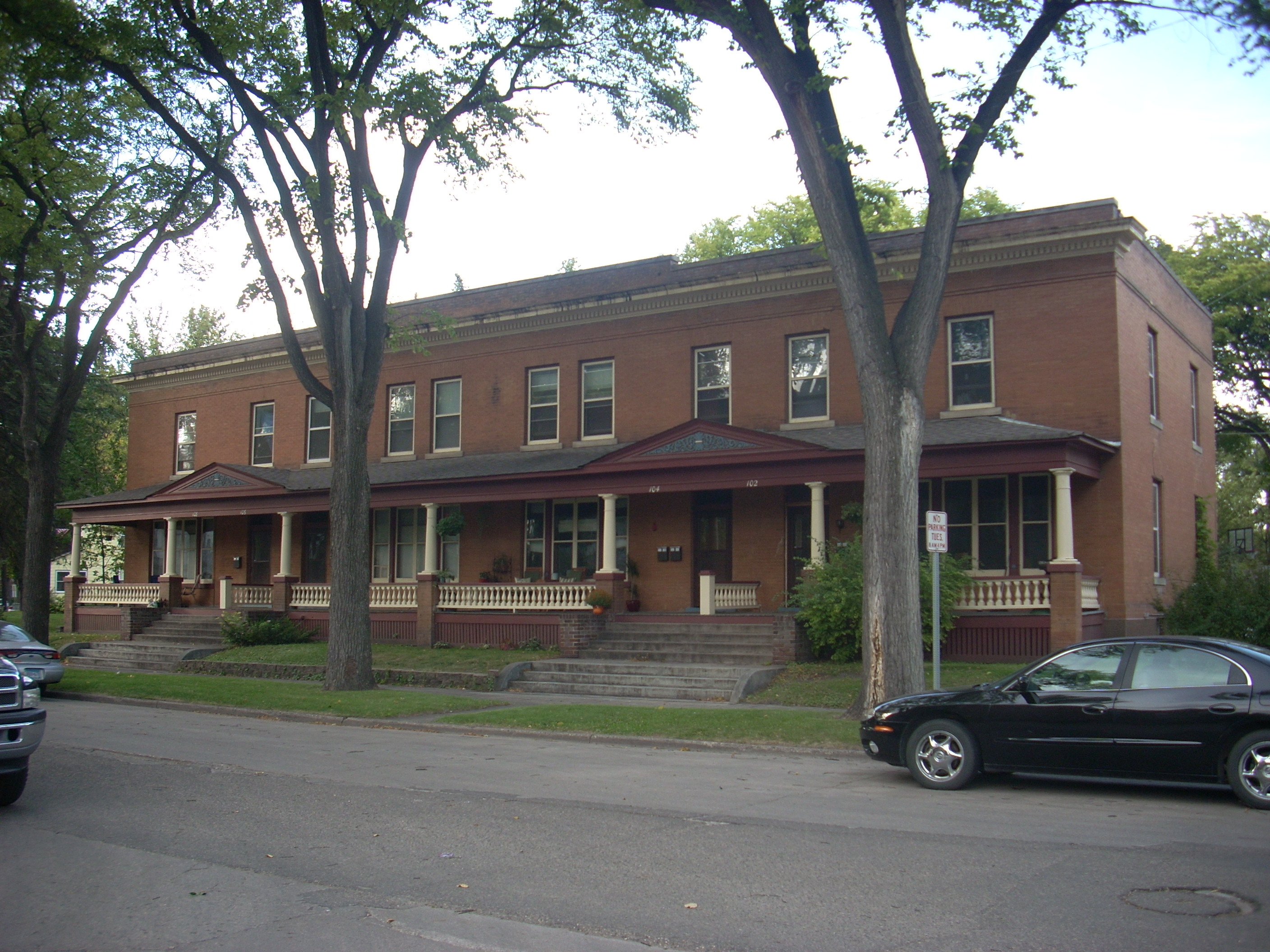

- Location within North Dakota Location within the United States
- Location: 102-108 Fourth Ave. S, Grand Forks, North Dakota
- Coordinates: 47°55′7″N 97°1′31″W
- Area: less than 1 acre (0.40 ha)
- Built: 1903
- Architect: Dinnie Brothers
- Architectural style: Classical Revival
- NRHP reference No.: 94000555
- Added to NRHP: June 3, 1994

Dinnie Apartments is a building in Grand Forks, North Dakota, United States. It was listed on the National Register of Historic Places (NRHP) in 1994. Dinnie Apartments is included in the Grand Forks Near Southside Historic District, which was listed on the NRHP in 2004.

== History ==
It was the first block of "spacious and elegant" townhouses built in Grand Forks at the turn-of-the-century. It was built in 1903 as four townhouses, in Classical Revival style. The south side of the city at that time was being populated by "wealthy merchants" during the Second Dakota Boom.

It was built by the firm of Dinnie Brothers.

== See also ==
- Dinnie Block
