= Hugo Magnuson =

American businessman and politician

Hugo R. Magnuson

Mayor of Grand Forks
- In office 1964–1972
- Preceded by: Nelson Youngs
- Succeeded by: C. P. O'Neill

Personal details
- Born: May 23, 1900 Parkers Prairie, Minnesota, U.S.
- Died: May 20, 2003 (aged 102)
- Resting place: Memorial Park Cemetery, Grand Forks, North Dakota, U.S.
- Known for: Founder of Hugo's grocery stores

Hugo R. Magnuson (May 23, 1900 – May 20, 2003) was an American businessman and politician. He founded the regional Hugo's grocery store chain. He was the mayor of the city of Grand Forks, North Dakota, from 1964 to 1972; he also served as a city council member for seventeen years.

== Early life ==
Hugo Ragnar Magnuson was born in Parkers Prairie, Minnesota. He was one of six children (including Minnie, Ernest, Esther, Hans, and Alfred) born to Carl Victor Magnuson (1863–1949) and Mary Sjobeck Magnuson (1866–1961).

== Career ==
He is best known for the chain of grocery stores which bears his name. He opened his first grocery outlet in Grand Forks in 1939 as a Pure Foods Store. For many years, Magnuson's stores carried the name Piggly Wiggly. That name was dropped in 1984, with the arrival of a new wholesaler, Nash Finch Company. Hugo's stores are located in eastern North Dakota and northwestern Minnesota.

== Personal life ==
He was married to Dorothy (Swenson) Magnuson (1908–1989), with whom he had four children. The city of Grand Forks declared May 2000 as "Hugo Magnuson Month", in honor of his 100th birthday. Magnuson died three days before his 103rd birthday in 2003. He was buried at Memorial Park Cemetery in Grand Forks, North Dakota.

== See also ==
- List of centenarians (businesspeople)
- List of centenarians (politicians and civil servants)
- List of mayors of Grand Forks, North Dakota

Preceded by Nelson Youngs	Mayor of Grand Forks; 1964–1972	Succeeded by C.P. O'Neill
