= Hugo's =

American grocery store chain

Hugo’s Family Marketplace
- Formerly: Pure Foods Store (1939–1984)
- Type: Private; family business
- Industry: Retail (Grocery)
- Founded: 1939; 87 years ago
- Founder: Hugo Magnuson; Dorothy Magnuson
- Headquarters: Grand Forks, North Dakota, U.S.
- Number of locations: 15 (2025)
- Area served: North Dakota; Minnesota
- Key people: Kristi Magnuson-Nelson (President)
- Products: Bakery, delicatessen, dairy, grocery, frozen foods, organic foods, bulk foods, meat, produce, seafood, wine, beer, spirits, floral products, pet supplies, general merchandise
- Services: Supermarket, Pharmacy
- Revenue: ▲$18.8 million (2021)
- Owner: Kristi Magnuson-Nelson
- Number of employees: 1,500 (2021)
- Website: gohugos.com

Hugo's Family Marketplace is a family-owned chain of supermarket grocery stores located in the U.S. states of North Dakota and Minnesota. It was founded by Hugo and Dorothy Magnuson in 1939. Hugo's is headquartered in the city of Grand Forks, North Dakota. The chain's stores have been supplied by the Nash Finch Company since 1939. Nash Finch was once headquartered in Grand Forks, but moved to Minneapolis, Minnesota in 1919.

== History ==
Hugo Magnuson, a former mayor of Grand Forks, opened his first grocery store, the Pure Food Market, in Grand Forks. Magnuson's grocery stores carried the Piggly Wiggly name for a period of years, before switching to the current "Hugo's" name.

After Hugo's retirement, his son Curtis Magnuson became president of the chain. Hugo died in 2003 at the age of 102. Curtis died in 2007 at the age of 66. The chain is now run by Curtis' daughter, Kristi Magnuson-Nelson.

Today, the chain operates 12 stores exclusively under the "Hugo's" name. The store's mascot is a cartoon of a smiling blonde boy named Seemore for Seemore Savings and the slogan is "More low prices, more great stuff, when you go to Hugo's".

The chain also operates Seven liquor stores in North Dakota and Minnesota under the banner Hugo's Wine and Spirits.

The chain most recently came to Fosston when they bought Palubicki’s SuperValu.

In 2024 they bought 50 percent of Doug’s Supermarket in Warroad, Lake Of The Woods Foods in Baudette, and Pine River Family Market in Pine River from Linder Hagen Grocery Stores

In 2025 they rebranded to Hugo’s

== Locations ==
=== North Dakota ===
- Grand Forks (five locations)
- Jamestown
- Grafton

=== Minnesota ===
- East Grand Forks
- Baudette
- Crookston
- Fosston
- Park Rapids
- Pine River
- Thief River Falls
- Warroad
