= Masonic Center (Grand Forks, North Dakota) =

- Masonic Temple
- U.S. National Register of Historic Places
- Location within North Dakota Location within the United States
- Location: 413-421 Bruce Ave., Grand Forks, North Dakota
- Coordinates: 47°55′18″N 97°1′43″W
- Built: 1913
- Built by: Dinnie Brothers
- Architect: Joseph Bell DeRemer
- Architectural style: Renaissance
- MPS: Downtown Grand Forks MRA
- NRHP reference No.: 82001331
- Added to NRHP: October 26, 1982

The Masonic Center (also known as the Masonic Temple) is a Renaissance style building in Grand Forks, North Dakota. It was designed by architect Joseph Bell DeRemer and was constructed by the Dinnie Brothers in 1913. It replaced the first Masonic Temple in Grand Forks, which had burned, and which was later reconstructed as the Stratford Building.

This building was listed on the National Register of Historic Places in 1982.
