= George B. Clifford House =

Historic house in North Dakota, United States

- U.S. National Register of Historic Places
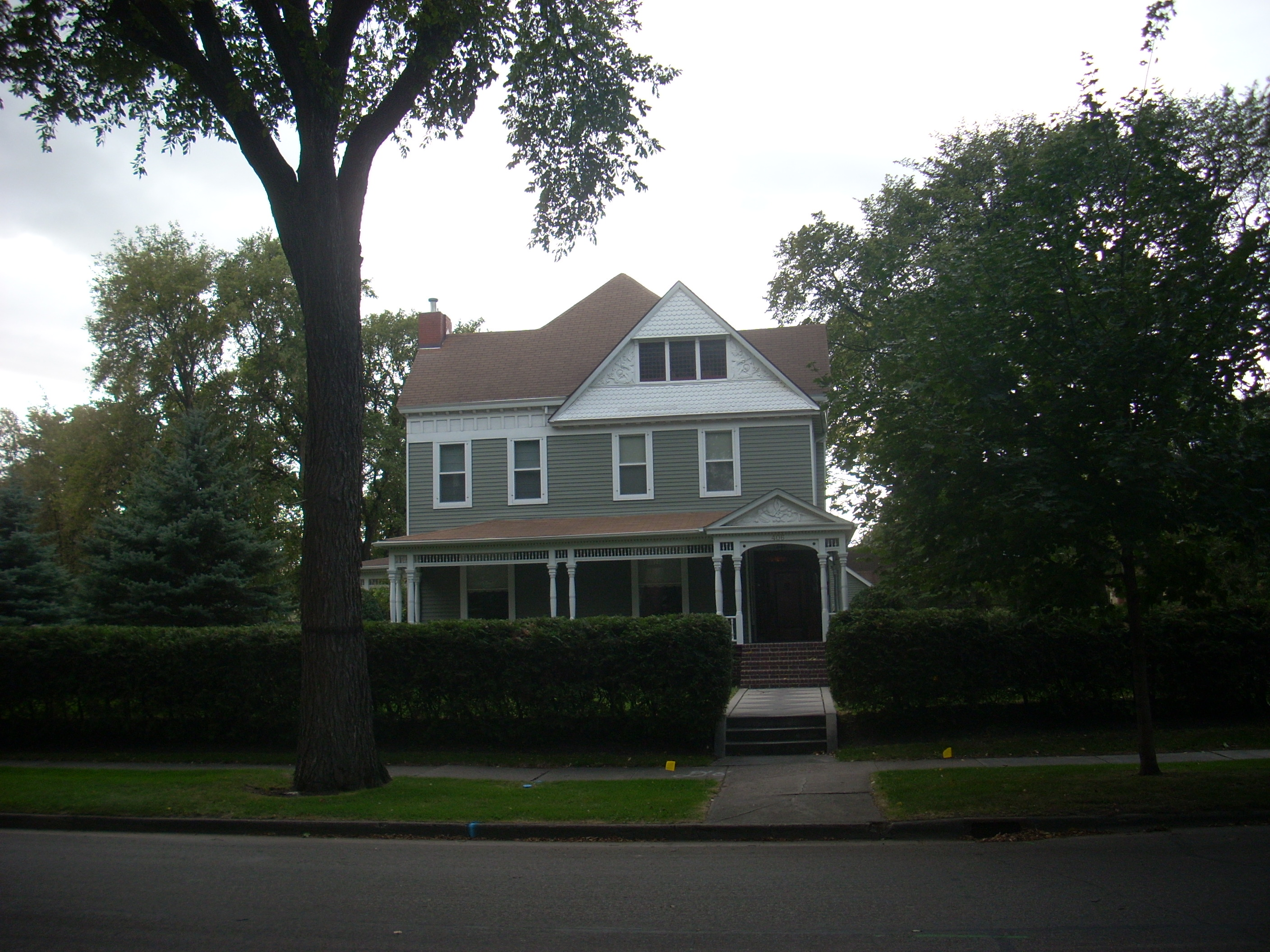

- Location within North Dakota Location within the United States
- Location: 406 Reeves Dr., Grand Forks, North Dakota
- Coordinates: 47°55′6″N 97°1′36″W
- Area: 1 acre (0.40 ha)
- Built: 1889
- Architect: DeRemer, Joseph Bell (1906 first floor redesign and addition)
- Architectural style: Queen Anne
- NRHP reference No.: 86002655
- Added to NRHP: September 30, 1986

The George B. Clifford House is a Queen Anne style Victorian home located in the Near Southside Historic District of Grand Forks, North Dakota. It is listed on the National Register of Historic Places.

== History ==
The house was built in 1889 on Reeves Drive, a street of impressive homes built for the early elite of the city of Grand Forks. It is one of North Dakota's best examples of early Queen Anne architecture. Because it was built only 13 years after the Watts-Sherman House in Newport, Rhode Island, said to be the first Queen Anne style house in the country, it is closer in design and detail to the original style as elaborated by British architect Richard Norman Shaw (1831–1912).

The house is also significant historically for its connection to George Barnard Clifford (1858-1943). Clifford was a prominent attorney and real estate developer, and one of the three founders of the Cream of Wheat company. His investments and links to northeastern capital represented an important contribution to the early years of progress after the first settlement of Grand Forks.
