= St. Catherine's Church of Lomice, North Dakota =

Historic church in North Dakota, United States

- U.S. National Register of Historic Places
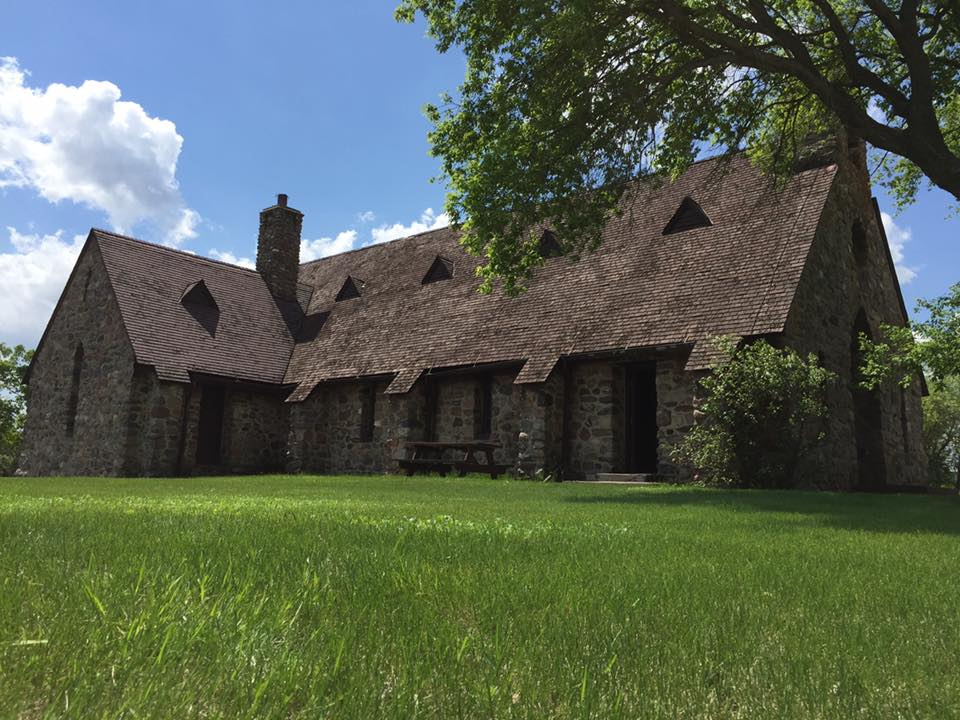

- Location within North Dakota Location within the United States
- Nearest city: Whitman, North Dakota
- Coordinates: 48°16′53″N 98°12′35″W
- Area: 5 acres (2.0 ha)
- Built: 1936
- Architect: DeRemer, Joseph Bell; et al.
- Architectural style: Late Gothic Revival
- NRHP reference No.: 06000249
- Added to NRHP: April 12, 2006

St. Catherine's Church of Lomice, North Dakota, near Whitman, North Dakota, United States, was built in 1936. It was designed by architect Joseph Bell DeRemer in Late Gothic Revival style. It has also been known as St. Catherine's Catholic Church, as St. Catherine's Church, and as St. Catherine Church. It was listed on the National Register of Historic Places in 2006. The listing included one contributing building and four contributing objects on 5 acres (2.0 ha).

It has a large grotto and three small grottoes. The church was founded by settlers from Bohemia in Czechoslovakia.
