= Brandon Bochenski =

American politician and ice hockey player

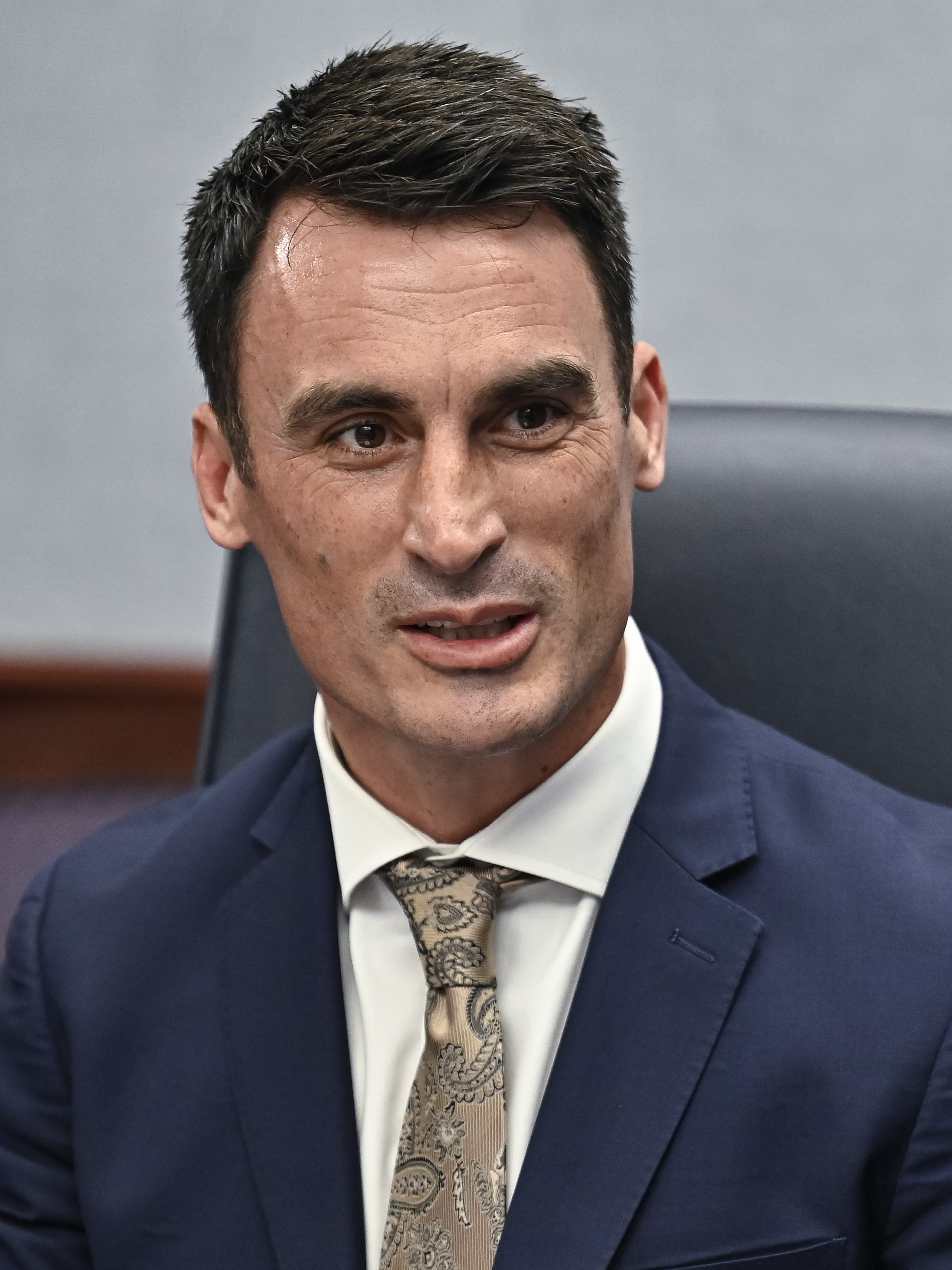
- Bochenski in 2024

27th Mayor of Grand Forks
- Incumbent
- Assumed office June 23, 2020
- Preceded by: Michael Brown

Personal details
- Born: Brandon Louis Bochenski; April 4, 1982 (age 44) Blaine, Minnesota, U.S.
- Party: Republican
- Spouse: Jennifer Helt (m. 2007)
- Children: 3
- Education: University of North Dakota (BA)
Ice hockey career
- Height: 6 ft 0 in (183 cm)
- Weight: 194 lb (88 kg; 13 st 12 lb)
- Position: Right wing
- Shot: Right
- Played for: Ottawa Senators; Chicago Blackhawks; Boston Bruins; Anaheim Ducks; Nashville Predators; Tampa Bay Lightning; Barys Astana
- National team: United States and Kazakhstan
- NHL draft: 223rd overall, 2001; Ottawa Senators
- Playing career: 2004–2019

Brandon Louis Bochenski (born April 4, 1982) is a Kazakh American former professional ice hockey player and politician. He played 156 games in the National Hockey League (NHL) for several teams before serving as captain of Barys Astana in the Kontinental Hockey League (KHL). Internationally Bochenski represented both the United States and Kazakhstan, playing in several World Championships. In June 2020, Bochenski was elected mayor of Grand Forks, North Dakota.

== Playing career ==
=== Early years ===
Bochenski went to Blaine High School where he graduated in 2000. Bochenski was a part of the Blaine Bengals when they defeated the Duluth East Greyhounds 6–0 in the 2000 class AA championship. Also in the Minnesota State High School League tournament, Bochenski and the Bengals defeated Rochester Mayo, Hastings and finished the tournament leading the AA in scoring with 7 points. The St. Paul Pioneer Press named Bochenski along with teammates Matt Hendricks and Matt Moore to the second team of the All-State Boys hockey team.

=== Amateur ===
With the Lincoln Stars of the USHL in 2000–01, Bochenski led the league in goals with 47 and was the single highest goal total in the league over the past 15 years. Playing in 55 games that year, Bochenski had 80 points and was named the USHL's Rookie of the Year. His standout performances were noticed by the Ottawa Senators and he was subsequently drafted in the seventh round, 223rd overall, in the 2001 NHL entry draft. Bochenski would then leave the USHL to pursue a collegiate career.

Bochenski was heavily recruited to play college hockey in the NCAA, finally choosing the University of North Dakota. Bochenski went on to spend three seasons with UND in the WCHA. As a freshman at UND, Bochenski led his team with five game-winning goals and was third in total points. While North Dakota failed to make the NCAA tournament in 2001–02, Bochenski would not fail again leading UND to two NCAA tournaments in his final two years at UND. In each of his final two years at UND, Bochenski led his team in goals, points and power play goals. After the 2003–04 season, Bochenski would sign with the Ottawa Senators where he would make his professional hockey debut with the Binghamton Senators of the AHL.

=== Professional ===
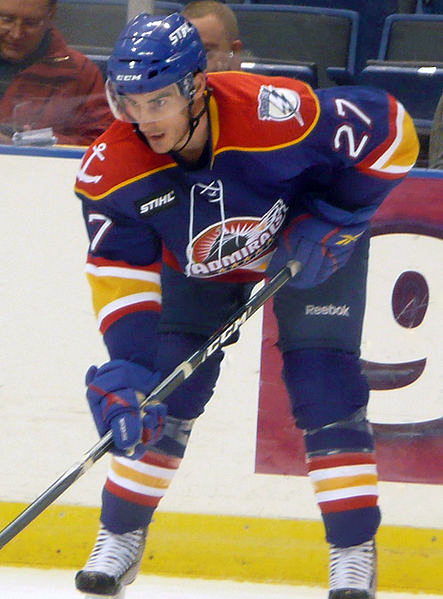
Bochenski with the Norfolk Admirals.

During his first season in the AHL with the Binghamton Senators, Bochenski racked up 34 goals and 36 assists for 70 points in just 75 games. The following year, he only saw action in 33 games, but scored 22 goals and had 24 assists. It would be the 2005–06 season when Bochenski would make his NHL debut with the Ottawa Senators.

After being called up from the Senators, Bochenski would debut on October 5, 2005, and go on to play in twenty games. His first NHL point was an assist versus the Buffalo Sabres on October 8, 2005. Just one week later on October 15, 2005, Bochenski would have his first career goal scoring against the Boston Bruins. In a game against the Florida Panthers on December 15, 2005, Bochenski scored his first career hat trick. Bochenski would then be traded to the Chicago Blackhawks, leaving the Ottawa Senators scoring six goals and assisting on seven others.

On March 9, 2006, he was traded to the Chicago Blackhawks along with a second-round pick in exchange for Tyler Arnason. Bochenski would record his first point for the Blackhawks on March 19, 2006, and his first goal on April 1, 2006. Bochenski would go on to play for the Blackhawks in twenty games before helping the Norfolk Admirals in which he tallied two points in three playoff games. In his twenty appearances in 2005–06, Bochenski would record four points.

In 2006–07, Bochenski spent the majority of the year with the Admirals. With Norfolk, Bochenski had a phenomenal year scoring at a torrid pace, 33 goals with 33 assists in just 35 games. After an early January 2007 injury to Martin Havlát, Bochenski was recalled and found more playing time. But on February 3, 2007, the Blackhawks traded him to the Boston Bruins for Kris Versteeg and a conditional pick. On February 6, 2007, soon after joining to the Bruins, Bochenski scored his first Bruin goal at the five-minute mark of the second period. The game ended in a 3–2 victory after a shootout against the Washington Capitals.

On June 18, 2007, Bochenski signed a one-year deal with the Boston Bruins for the 2007–08 season. However seldom used as a reserve forward after 20 games with the Bruins on January 2, 2008, the Bruins traded Bochenski to the Anaheim Ducks for Shane Hnidy and a 6th round pick in the 2008 NHL entry draft. He played in 12 games with the Ducks with 4 points before he was traded to his third team within the season, the Nashville Predators, for future considerations on February 26, 2008.

On July 8, 2008, Bochenski joined his sixth NHL team when he signed as a free agent to a two-year contract with the Tampa Bay Lightning. Prior to the 2008–09 season on September 25, 2008, the Lightning placed Bochenski on waivers for the purpose of sending him to American Hockey League affiliate team, the Norfolk Admirals. Returning to Norfolk for a second stint, who were formerly affiliates with the Blackhawks, Bochenski was among scoring leaders of the Admirals and often the Lightnings first recall in cases of injury. After two seasons within the Lightning organization, Brandon became the Admirals record goal scoring leader, passing Casey Hankinson 76 goals to finish with 81 as well as hold the record for most game-winning goals (15) and power play goals (34).

On May 5, 2010, Bochenski left North America and signed a one-year contract in Russia's top league the Kontinental Hockey League, for Barys Astana.

Bochenski was amongst the league's top scorers over the following seven seasons with Barys Astana. On May 29, 2017, despite pleas from Astana to continue with the club, Bochenski opted to retire from professional hockey to concentrate on his family. He left as the top scoring foreign player to compete in the KHL with 397 points in 399 total games.

On July 9, 2018, Bochenski announced his comeback when he signed a one-year deal to return to Barys Astana. In the 2018–19 season, Bochenski continued to produce with Barys, contributing with 15 goals and 34 points in 44 games.

== Post-playing career ==
At the conclusion of his one-year contract, Bochenski announced his retirement for the second and final time, accepting a position within Berkshire Hathaway Home Services in Grand Forks, North Dakota on July 15, 2019.

He turned to politics, and on June 9, 2020, was elected the mayor of Grand Forks, North Dakota, defeating the 20 year incumbent by nearly 18%. On June 11, 2024, Bochenski was re-elected to the Grand Forks mayoral office after running unopposed.

== International play ==
On March 24, 2016, the IIHF announced it had approved a request to allow Bochenski, Nigel Dawes and Dustin Boyd to play for Kazakhstan at the 2016 IIHF World Championship.

His last international tournament was the 2019 Division IA World Championship. Captaining Kazakhstan he helped the team win the tournament and earn promotion to the top level for the 2020 World Championship.

== Career statistics ==
=== Regular season and playoffs ===
			Regular season					Playoffs
Season	Team	League	GP	G	A	Pts	PIM	GP	G	A	Pts	PIM
1998–99	Blaine High School	HS-MN	—	—	—	—	—	—	—	—	—	—
1999–00	Blaine High School	HS-MN	28	32	30	62	—	—	—	—	—	—
2000–01	Lincoln Stars	USHL	55	47	33	80	22	11	5	7	12	4
2001–02	University of North Dakota	WCHA	36	17	15	32	34	—	—	—	—	—
2002–03	University of North Dakota	WCHA	43	35	27	62	42	—	—	—	—	—
2003–04	University of North Dakota	WCHA	41	27	33	60	40	—	—	—	—	—
2004–05	Binghamton Senators	AHL	75	34	36	70	16	6	1	0	1	2
2005–06	Binghamton Senators	AHL	33	22	24	46	36	—	—	—	—	—
2005–06	Ottawa Senators	NHL	20	6	7	13	14	—	—	—	—	—
2005–06	Chicago Blackhawks	NHL	20	2	2	4	8	—	—	—	—	—
2005–06	Norfolk Admirals	AHL	—	—	—	—	—	3	1	1	2	0
2006–07	Norfolk Admirals	AHL	35	33	33	66	31	—	—	—	—	—
2006–07	Chicago Blackhawks	NHL	10	2	0	2	2	—	—	—	—	—
2006–07	Boston Bruins	NHL	31	11	11	22	14	—	—	—	—	—
2007–08	Boston Bruins	NHL	20	0	6	6	6	—	—	—	—	—
2007–08	Anaheim Ducks	NHL	12	2	2	4	6	—	—	—	—	—
2007–08	Nashville Predators	NHL	8	1	2	3	0	3	0	0	0	0
2008–09	Norfolk Admirals	AHL	69	27	26	53	48	—	—	—	—	—
2008–09	Tampa Bay Lightning	NHL	7	0	1	1	2	—	—	—	—	—
2009–10	Norfolk Admirals	AHL	42	21	19	40	16	—	—	—	—	—
2009–10	Tampa Bay Lightning	NHL	28	4	9	13	2	—	—	—	—	—
2010–11	Barys Astana	KHL	40	22	23	45	36	4	0	1	1	2
2011–12	Barys Astana	KHL	49	27	32	59	26	7	0	5	5	8
2012–13	Barys Astana	KHL	48	20	20	40	22	7	4	3	7	12
2013–14	Barys Astana	KHL	54	28	30	58	55	10	2	7	9	14
2014–15	Barys Astana	KHL	60	20	36	56	60	1	0	0	0	0
2015–16	Barys Astana	KHL	60	20	41	61	48	—	—	—	—	—
2016–17	Barys Astana	KHL	57	17	36	53	76	2	0	3	3	2
2018–19	Barys Astana	KHL	44	15	19	34	10	12	4	9	13	0
KHL totals			412	169	237	406	333	43	10	28	38	38
AHL totals			256	138	138	276	147	9	2	1	3	2
NHL totals			156	28	40	68	54	3	0	0	0	0

=== International ===
Year	Team	Event	GP	G	A	Pts	PIM
2007	United States	WC	7	2	3	5	6
2016	Kazakhstan	OGQ	3	2	0	2	2
2016	Kazakhstan	WC	7	1	2	3	4
2017	Kazakhstan	WC D1A	5	2	5	7	4
2019	Kazakhstan	WC D1A	4	0	4	4	0
Senior totals			26	7	14	21	16

== Awards and honors ==
Award	Year
USHL
Rookie of the year	2000–01
College
All-WCHA Rookie Team	2001–02
WCHA Rookie of the year	2001–02
All-WCHA Second Team	2002–03
All-WCHA First Team	2003–04
AHCA West First-Team All-American	2003–04
WCHA All-Tournament Team	2004
AHL
All-Star Game	2005
All-Rookie Team	2005
KHL
All-Star Game	2012, 2014
Best Sniper	2012

Awards and achievements
Preceded by Peter Sejna	WCHA Rookie of the Year; 2001–02	Succeeded by Thomas Vanek
