= Parkers Prairie, Minnesota =

City in Minnesota, United States

Parkers Prairie
- City
- Location of Parkers Prairie within Otter Tail County, Minnesota
- Coordinates: 46°09′11″N 95°19′44″W
- Country: United States
- State: Minnesota
- County: Otter Tail
- Founded: 1880

Area
  - Total: 1.25 sq mi (3.24 km^{2})
  - Land: 1.25 sq mi (3.23 km^{2})
  - Water: 0.0077 sq mi (0.02 km^{2})
- Elevation: 1,467 ft (447 m)

Population (2020)
  - Total: 1,020
  - Estimate (2021): 1,009
  - Density: 819.1/sq mi (316.24/km^{2})
- Time zone: UTC-6 (CST)
  - Summer (DST): UTC-5 (CDT)
- ZIP code: 56361
- Area code: 218
- FIPS code: 27-49732
- GNIS feature ID: 2396151
- Website: parkersprairie.net

Parkers Prairie is a city in Otter Tail County, Minnesota, United States. The population was 1,020 at the 2020 census.

== History ==
Parkers Prairie was platted in 1880, some ten years after its namesake Parkers Prairie Township. The city was incorporated in 1903.

== Geography ==
According to the United States Census Bureau, the city has a total area of 1.23 square miles (3.19 km^{2}), of which 1.22 square miles (3.16 km^{2}) is land and 0.01 square miles (0.03 km^{2}) is water.

Minnesota State Highway 29 and Otter Tail County Road 38 are two of the main routes in the community.

== Demographics ==
Historical population
Census	Pop.	Note	%±
1910	383		—
1920	570		48.8%
1930	631		10.7%
1940	781		23.8%
1950	900		15.2%
1960	884		−1.8%
1970	882		−0.2%
1980	917		4.0%
1990	956		4.3%
2000	991		3.7%
2010	1,011		2.0%
2020	1,020		0.9%
2021 (est.)	1,009		−1.1%
U.S. Decennial Census; 2020 Census

=== 2010 census ===
As of the census of 2010, there were 1,011 people, 428 households, and 248 families living in the city. The population density was 828.7 inhabitants per square mile (320.0/km^{2}). There were 464 housing units at an average density of 380.3 per square mile (146.8/km^{2}). The racial makeup of the city was 99.2% White, 0.4% African American, 0.1% Native American, 0.1% from other races, and 0.2% from two or more races. Hispanic or Latino of any race were 0.4% of the population.

There were 428 households, of which 28.3% had children under the age of 18 living with them, 44.9% were married couples living together, 9.6% had a female householder with no husband present, 3.5% had a male householder with no wife present, and 42.1% were non-families. 38.3% of all households were made up of individuals, and 23.9% had someone living alone who was 65 years of age or older. The average household size was 2.20 and the average family size was 2.90.

The median age in the city was 46.6 years. 24% of residents were under the age of 18; 5.7% were between the ages of 18 and 24; 18.7% were from 25 to 44; 21% were from 45 to 64; and 30.3% were 65 years of age or older. The gender makeup of the city was 45.7% male and 54.3% female.

=== 2000 census ===
As of the census of 2000, there were 991 people, 401 households, and 240 families living in the town. The population density was 841.8 inhabitants per square mile (325.0/km^{2}). There were 442 housing units at an average density of 375.4 per square mile (144.9/km^{2}). The racial makeup of the town was 99.39% White, 0.10% Asian, 0.10% from other races, and 0.40% from two or more races. Hispanic or Latino of any race were 0.61% of the population.

There were 401 households, out of which 25.4% had children under the age of 18 living with them, 50.6% were married couples living together, 7.5% had a female householder with no husband present, and 40.1% were non-families. 34.7% of all households were made up of individuals, and 23.2% had someone living alone who was 65 years of age or older. The average household size was 2.22 and the average family size was 2.88.

In the town the population was spread out, with 20.8% under the age of 18, 6.0% from 18 to 24, 22.9% from 25 to 44, 20.7% from 45 to 64, and 29.7% who were 65 years of age or older. The median age was 45 years. For every 100 females, there were 90.9 males. For every 100 females age 18 and over, there were 85.1 males.

The median income for a household in the town was $28,618, and the median income for a family was $36,042. Males had a median income of $28,068 versus $19,250 for females. The per capita income for the town was $16,748. About 6.0% of families and 12.2% of the population were below the poverty line, including 13.6% of those under age 18 and 16.3% of those age 65 or over.

== Industry ==
Parkers Prairie has a number of different primary and secondary industries, from machine parts manufacture to arable produce processing. The high-tech medical device company AbbeyMoor Medical has its head office and manufacturing plant in Parkers Prairie. AbbeyMoor Medical manufactures The Spanner, a prostatic stent.

== Notable people ==
- Duane Hanson – sculptor
- Donald M. Hultstrand – Bishop of Springfield, Illinois
- Hugo Magnuson – grocer
- Karen Nyberg - NASA astronaut
