= Franklin School (Jamestown, North Dakota) =

- U.S. National Register of Historic Places
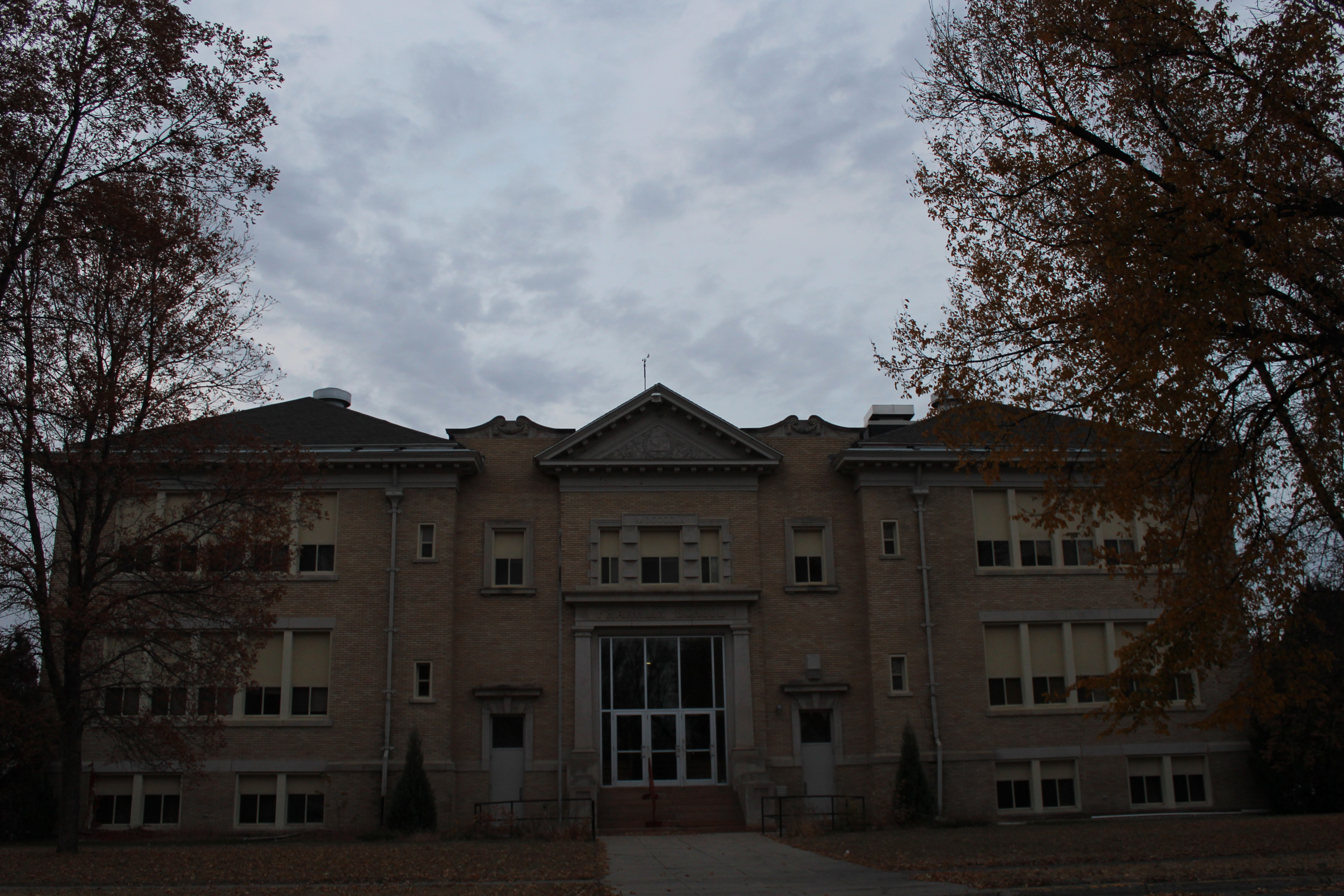

- Location within North Dakota Location within the United States
- Location: 308 Second St. SW, Jamestown, North Dakota
- Coordinates: 46°54′28″N 98°42′42″W
- Area: less than one acre
- Built: 1909
- Built by: Holund, John O.
- Architect: DeRemer, Joseph Bell
- Architectural style: Classical Revival
- NRHP reference No.: 02000474
- Added to NRHP: May 9, 2002

The Franklin School on Second St. SW in Jamestown, North Dakota, United States, was built in 1909. It was designed by architect Joseph Bell DeRemer.

It was listed on the National Register of Historic Places (NRHP) in 2002.

According to its NRHP nomination, the building is an '"impressive Classical Revival style structure" and "the style was in keeping with early twentieth-century social sentiment that educational facilities generally reflect a nobility of purpose. The ninety-two-year-old building exhibits exceptional integrity of materials and design."

The building now houses CSi Cable Services, but the historical integrity of the building remains intact. Visitors can embark on self-guided tours. Visitors can walk the same halls as one of the school's famous students, Louis L'Amour.
