= Whitman, North Dakota =

- Unincorporated community
- Location within North Dakota Location within the United States
- Coordinates: 48°09′31″N 98°07′11″W
- Country: United States
- State: North Dakota
- County: Nelson
- Elevation: 1,529 ft (466 m)
- Time zone: UTC-6 (Central (CST))
  - Summer (DST): UTC-5 (CDT)
- Area code: 701
- GNIS feature ID: 1032797

Whitman is an unincorporated community in Nelson County, North Dakota, United States. Whitman is located along North Dakota Highway 35 and the Northern Plains Railroad, 9.3 miles (15.0 km) north of Michigan and about thirty minutes east of Devils Lake.

In 2012, it was reported that Whitman had a population of two people who lived on the edge of the city. Whitman was founded one hundred years earlier in 1912 when the Soo Line Railroad was built through North Dakota. At one time, Whitman had a post office, fire department, lumber yard, community hall and school. In 1959, Whitman consolidated with Michigan City, North Dakota and the school was closed. Hundreds of people showed up for Whitman's Centennial celebration in 2012.

Despite its near ghost town status, Whitman has a very well-kept church, Sarnia United Lutheran Church, in the center of town. St. Catherine's Church of Lomice, North Dakota, located nearby, was added to the National Register of Historic Places in 2006.
