= St. Paul's Episcopal Church (Rugby, North Dakota) =

Historic church in North Dakota, United States

- U.S. National Register of Historic Places
- Location within North Dakota Location within the United States
- Location: 404 DeSmet St., now 312 2nd Ave., S.W, Rugby, North Dakota
- Coordinates: 48°21′58″N 99°59′55″W
- Area: less than one acre
- Built: 1903
- Architect: Joseph Bell DeRemer
- Architectural style: Late Gothic Revival
- MPS: Episcopal Churches of North Dakota MPS
- NRHP reference No.: 92001608
- Added to NRHP: December 3, 1992

St. Paul's Episcopal Church is an historic Episcopal church building located at 404 DeSmet Street, now 312 2nd Avenue, South West, in Rugby, Pierce County, North Dakota. Designed in the Late Gothic Revival style of architecture by noted Grand Forks architect Joseph Bell DeRemer, it was built in 1903 to 1905 of local fieldstone with concrete mortar and wooden gables and roof. Its stained glass windows which came from Holy Trinity Parish in New York City and arrived in poor condition were refitted by members of the congregation. Around 1968 the church closed and remained vacant until 1991 when a local undertaker bought it. On December 3, 1992, it was added to the National Register of Historic Places.

Today the building is home to the Victorian Dress Museum and Boutique, which features reproductions of Victorian dresses and accessories.
