= Dickinson Area Public Library =

- Dickinson (Carnegie Area) Public Library
- U.S. National Register of Historic Places
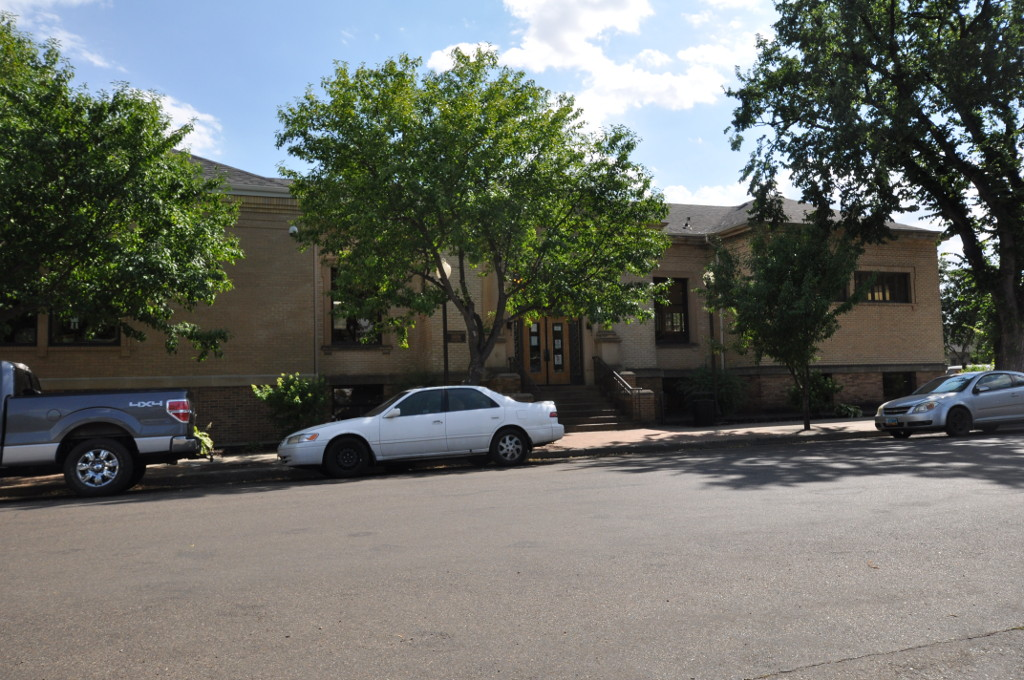

- Location within North Dakota Location within the United States
- Location: 139 3rd St. W., Dickinson, North Dakota
- Coordinates: 46°53′1″N 102°47′17″W
- Area: less than one acre
- Built: 1909
- Built by: Soules and Butler
- Architect: DeRemer, Joseph Bell
- Architectural style: Classical Revival, Beaux Arts
- MPS: Philanthropically Established Libraries in North Dakota MPS
- NRHP reference No.: 08000735
- Added to NRHP: July 31, 2008

The Dickinson (Carnegie Area) Public Library on 3rd St. W. in Dickinson, North Dakota was built in 1909 as a Carnegie library, funded by a $12,500 grant.

A 1938 expansion was a Works Project Administration project, with design by Louis W. Veigel. It was expanded again in 1975 at cost of in 1975 for $224,541.

There is record of architect Joseph Bell DeRemer having association with the building. It has elements of Classical Revival and Beaux Arts architecture.

It was listed on the National Register of Historic Places in 2008.

== See also ==
- List of Carnegie libraries in North Dakota
