= New Hampshire Apartments =

- Formerly listed on the U.S. National Register of Historic Places
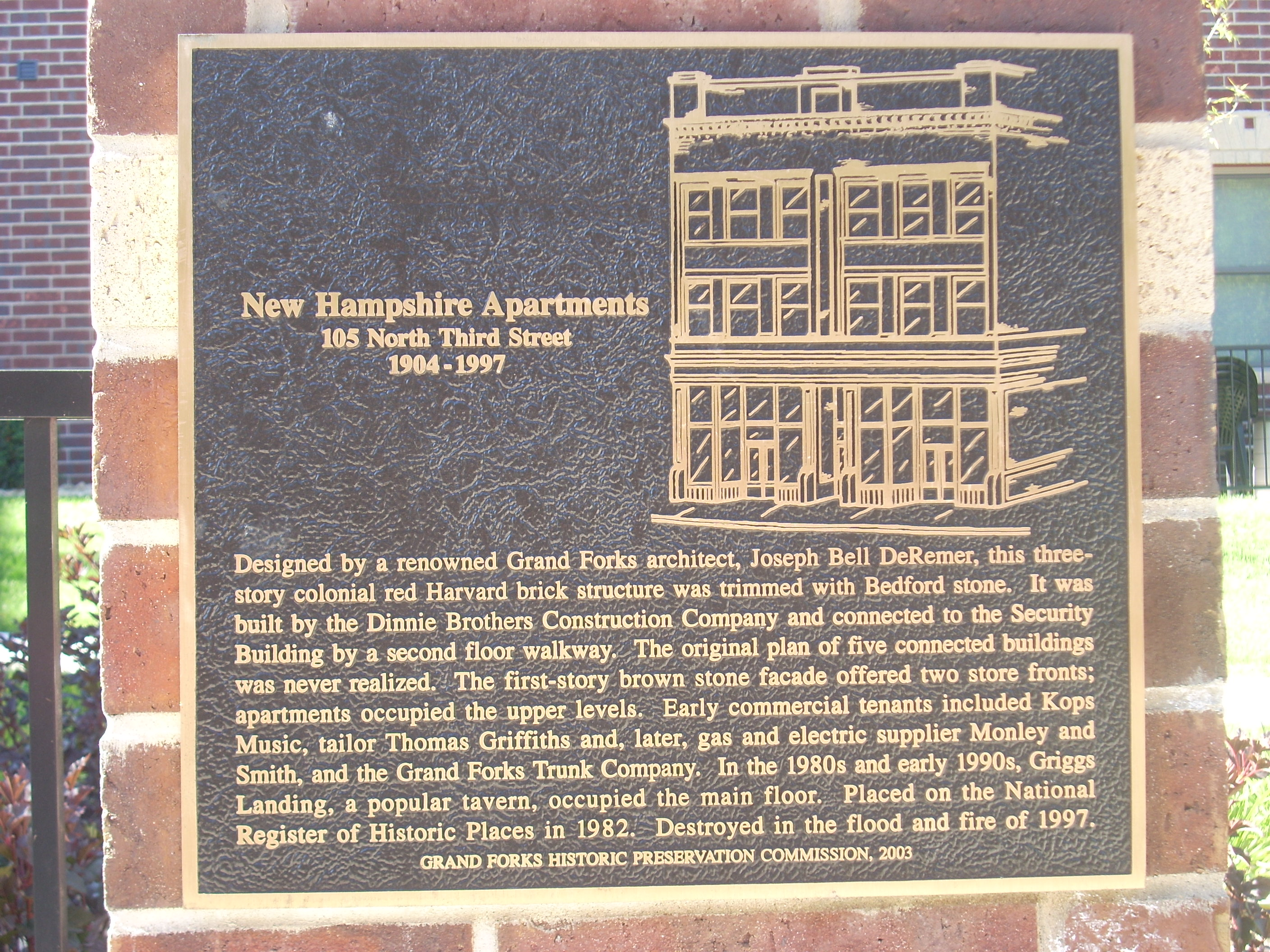

- Location within North Dakota Location within the United States
- Location: 105 N. 3rd St., Grand Forks, North Dakota
- Coordinates: 47°55′33.3″N 97°1′55.1″W
- Area: less than 1 acre (0.40 ha)
- Built: 1904
- Built by: Dinnie Brothers
- Architect: Joseph Bell DeRemer
- Architectural style: Early Commercial, Vernacular
- MPS: Downtown Grand Forks MRA
- NRHP reference No.: 82001332

Significant dates
- Added to NRHP: October 26, 1982
- Removed from NRHP: July 13, 2018

The New Hampshire Apartments in Grand Forks, North Dakota were listed on the National Register of Historic Places in 1982. They were built in 1904 at a cost of $26,000 and were significant as a building designed by architect Joseph Bell DeRemer. The apartments were an example of commercial vernacular architecture, and the building was the first in Grand Forks to have a planned second-story-level walkway to another building (the Security Building). When listed on the National Register, the apartment complex was one of few remaining downtown structures designed by DeRemer with classical details. It was built by the Dinnie Brothers, a construction firm that was established in 1881 and was at one time responsible for the building of more than 60 percent of the commercial buildings in Grand Forks.

A historical marker indicates that the building was destroyed in the 1997 Red River flood and fire. It was officially delisted from the National Register in 2018.
