= Grand Forks Near Southside Historic District =

Historic district in North Dakota, United States

- U.S. National Register of Historic Places
- U.S. Historic district
- Location within North Dakota Location within the United States
- Location: Roughly bounded by ND 697, Red River, 13th Ave. and Cottonwood St., 1216 Belmont Rd., Grand Forks, North Dakota
- Coordinates: 47°55′3″N 97°1′37″W
- Area: 182 acres (74 ha)
- Built: 1880, 1885, 1887, 1913
- Architect: Joseph Bell DeRemer
- Architectural style: Mid 19th Century Revival and Late Victorian, Prairie School, Foursquare
- NRHP reference No.: 04000757 (original); 06000533 (increase)

Significant dates
- Added to NRHP: July 28, 2004
- Boundary increase: June 26, 2006

The Grand Forks Near Southside Historic District is a 182-acre (74 ha) historic district in Grand Forks, North Dakota that was listed on the National Register of Historic Places (NRHP) in 2004.

Many of the district's subdivisions were platted in 1878 in anticipation of railroad construction. Development was spurred by the arrival of the Great Northern Railroad in 1880 and a branch line of the Northern Pacific Railroad in 1885. The construction of Belmont Elementary School in 1887 and South Junior High School in 1932 were important developments in the area's later history. Significant growth of the district ended circa 1942.

Architectural styles in the district include Mid 19th Century Revival and Late Victorian architecture. Joseph Bell DeRemer is among the architects who designed district buildings.

When first listed, the district included 423 contributing buildings, one contributing structure and one contributing object. Also included are 183 non-contributing buildings. The Dinnie Apartments, built in 1903, which were individually listed on the NRHP in 1985, are included in the district. In 2006 the district was increased to identify a house built in 1913 with Prairie School and Foursquare architecture as an additional contributing property.
