= Dinnie Brothers =

The Dinnie Brothers was a construction firm in Grand Forks and Fargo, North Dakota. They built over 60 percent of the commercial buildings in Grand Forks, and much of downtown Fargo after the Fargo Fire of 1893. Both brothers were born at Dundas County, Ontario, Canada. They came to Grand Forks in 1881.

Both of the Dinnie brothers, John Dinnie (August 24, 1853 – December 8, 1910) and James A. Dinnie, (February 7, 1863 – February 8, 1938) served as mayor of Grand Forks.

According to a 1981 survey of historic resources in what was later designated the Downtown Grand Forks Historic District area

The heyday of the resource area with its many beautifully constructed brick buildings corresponds to the era of fine craftsmen in bricklaying, between 1880 and the 1930s. Two of the outstanding bricklayers in Grand Forks were Sander Johnson and the Dinnie Brothers, John and James. The Dinnie Brothers firm was established in Grand Forks in 1881. John and James began as common bricklayers and expanded their business into the largest construction firm in the Red River Valley by 1909, at which time they owned extensive interests in brickyards in eastern North Dakota....
Sander Johnson laid brick for the Dinnie Brothers at the turn of the century and constructed his first building in 1907, laying the brick himself. Johnson's older brothers were employed by the Dinnie Brothers and Henry Johnson eventually took over the Dinnie firm in the 1930s.

Works by the firm include:

- Dinnie Apartments, 102-108 Fourth Ave. S, Grand Forks, ND (Dinnie Brothers) NRHP-listed
- Masonic Temple, 413-421 Bruce Ave., Grand Forks, ND (Dinnie Brothers) NRHP-listed
- Ramsey County Sheriff's House, 420 6th St., Devils Lake, ND (Dinnie Bros.) NRHP-listed
- New Hampshire Block, NRHP-listed
