= Stratford Building =

- U.S. National Register of Historic Places
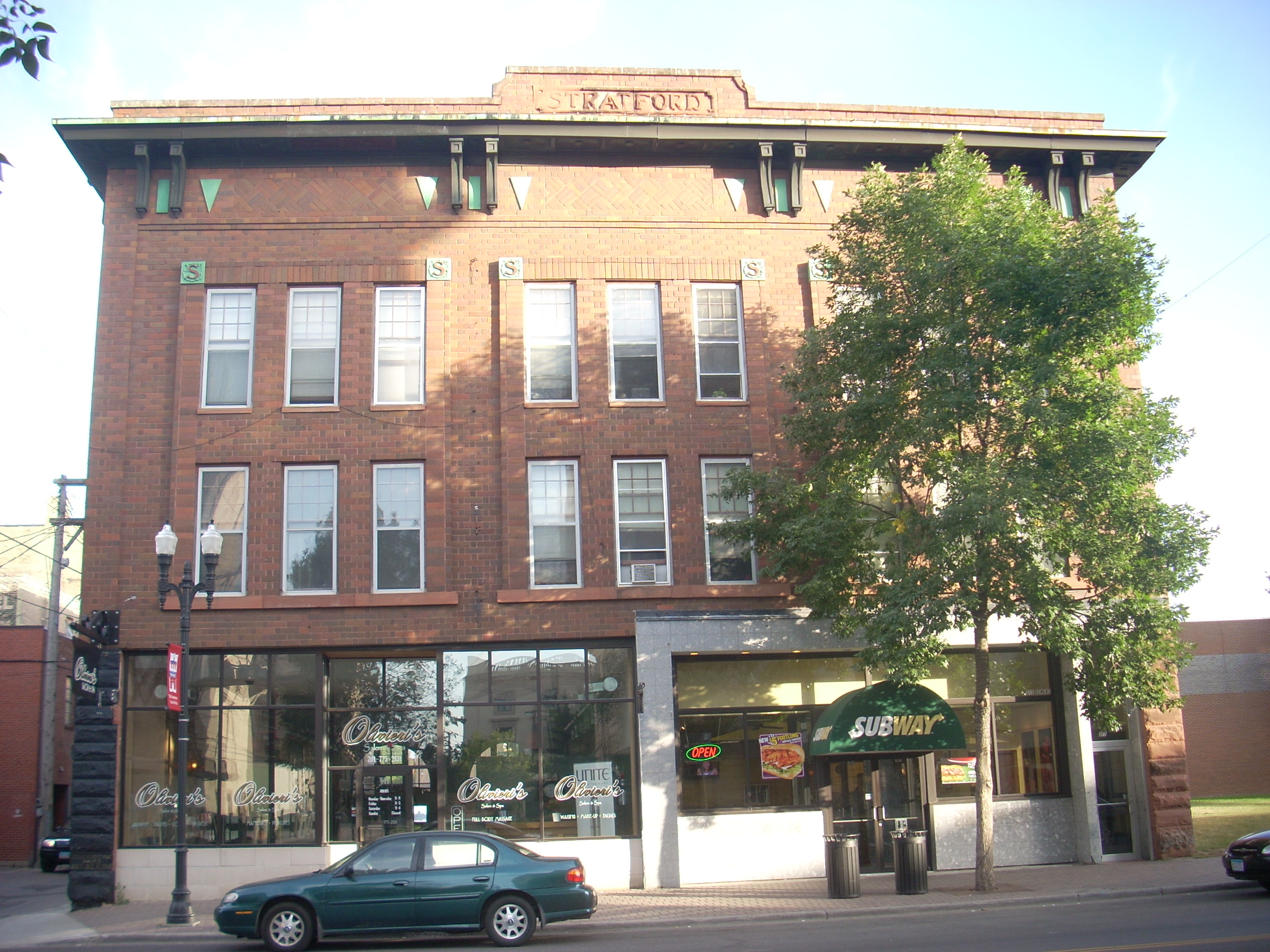

- Location within North Dakota Location within the United States
- Location: 311 DeMers Ave., Grand Forks, North Dakota
- Coordinates: 47°55′29″N 97°1′50″W
- Area: less than 1 acre (0.40 ha)
- Built: 1913
- Architectural style: Early Commercial; Vernacular-Craftsman
- MPS: Downtown Grand Forks MRA
- NRHP reference No.: 82001339
- Added to NRHP: October 26, 1982

The Stratford Building is a property in Grand Forks, North Dakota that was listed on the National Register of Historic Places in 1982.

It was built in 1913 as a reconstruction of the first, 1902-built Masonic Temple building in Grand Forks, which had burned partially on January 18, 1912. The reconstruction retained parts of the first floor of the earlier version.

It includes Early Commercial, "Vernacular-Craftsman" and other architecture.

When listed the property included just the one contributing building on an area of less than 1 acre (0.40 ha).

The listing is described in its North Dakota Cultural Resources Survey document.

The property was covered in a 1981 study of Downtown Grand Forks historical resources.
