= United Lutheran Church (Grand Forks, North Dakota) =

Historic church in North Dakota, United States

- U.S. National Register of Historic Places
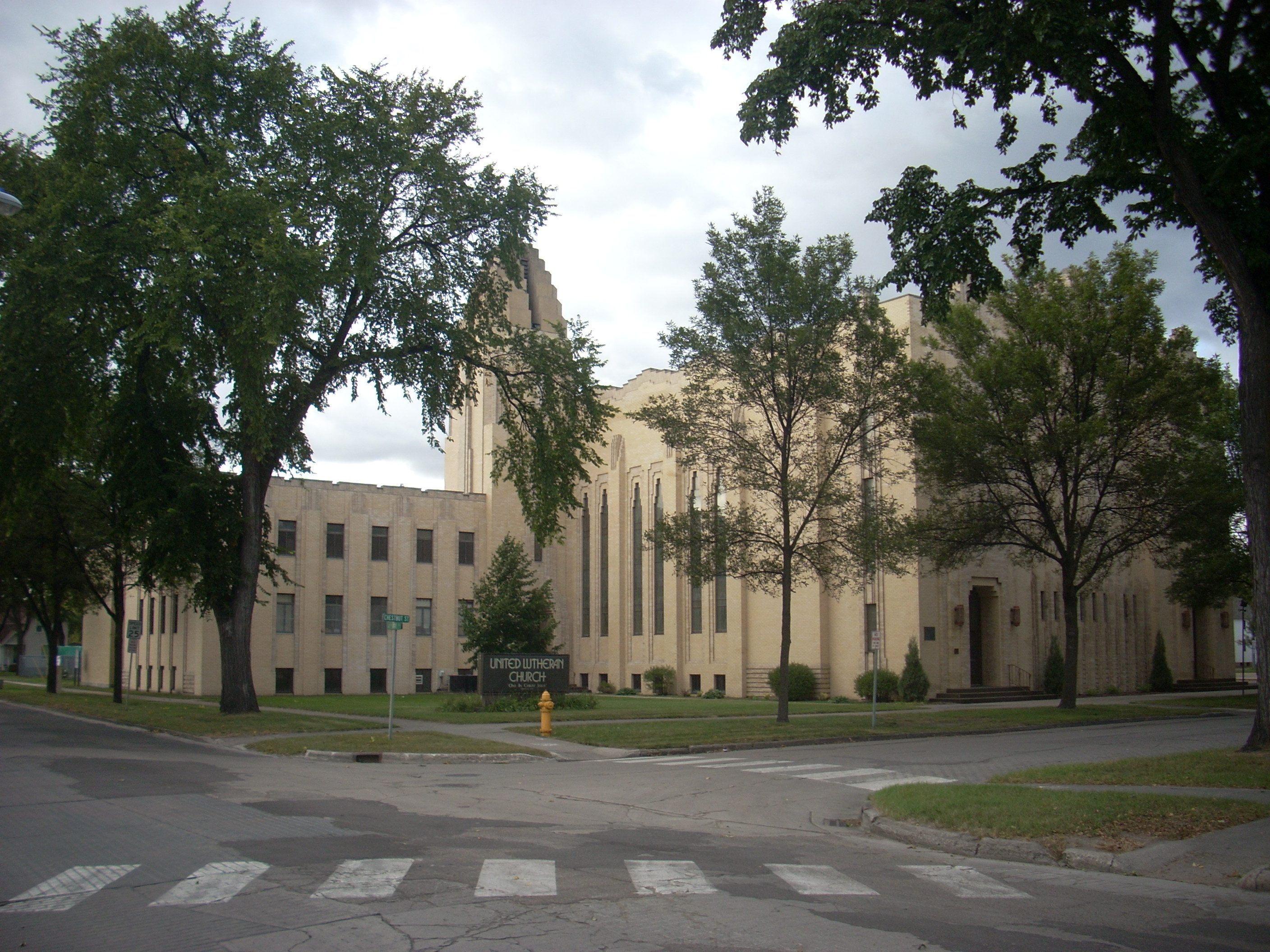

- Location within North Dakota Location within the United States
- Location: 324 Chestnut St., Grand Forks, North Dakota
- Coordinates: 47°55′7″N 97°1′49″W
- Area: 1 acre (0.40 ha)
- Built: 1931-1941
- Architect: Joseph Bell DeRemer & Samuel Teel DeRemer; builder - Carl G. Steen Co.
- Architectural style: Art Deco
- NRHP reference No.: 91001906
- Added to NRHP: December 30, 1991

The United Lutheran Church is a church located at 324 Chestnut Street in Grand Forks, North Dakota. The historic church building was listed on the National Register of Historic Places in 1991.

== History ==
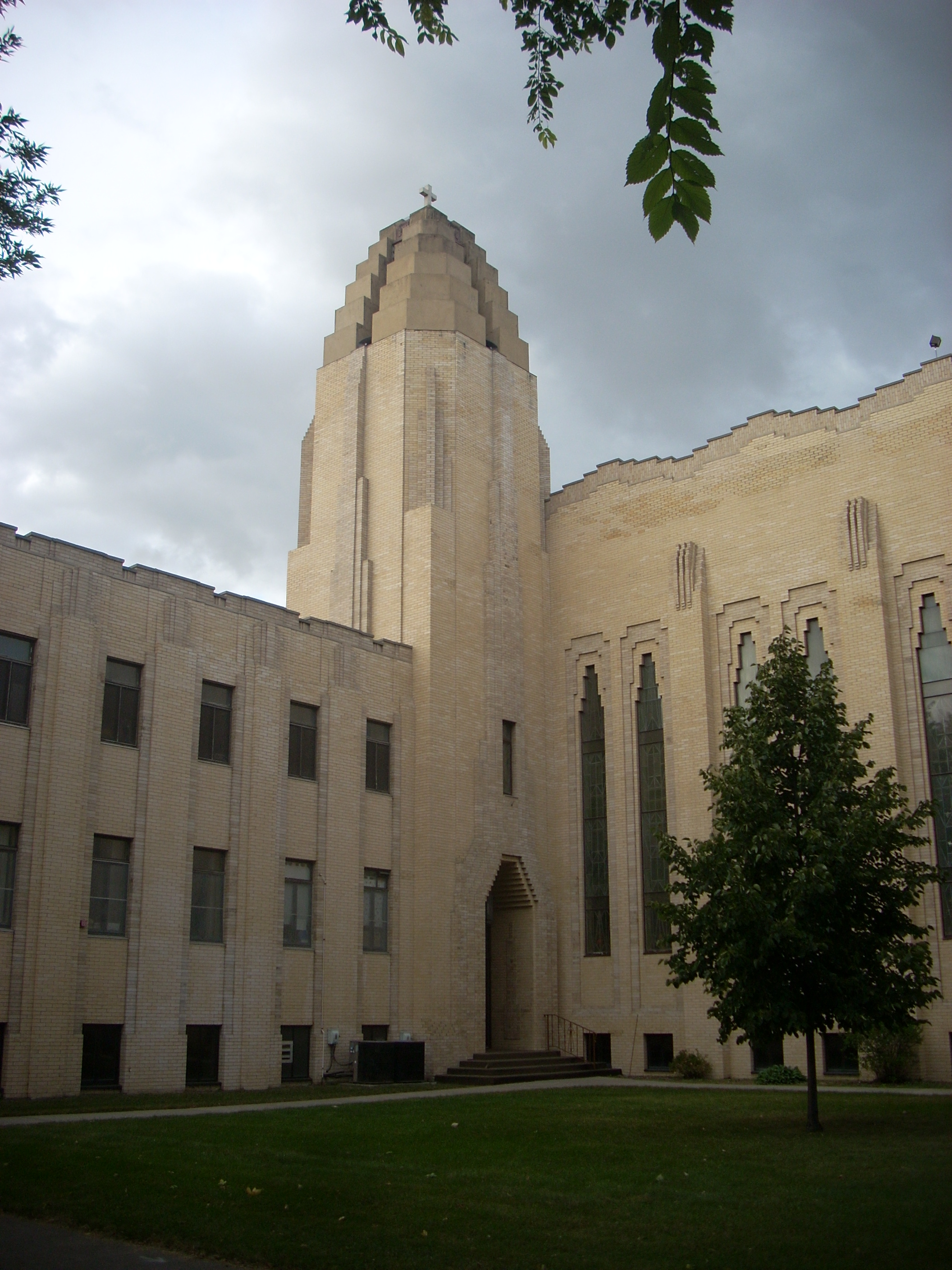
Art Deco bell tower of United Lutheran Church

United Lutheran Church is the result of a merger of three early Lutheran congregations in Grand Forks: Zion, Trinity and First. The church is affiliated with the Eastern North Dakota Synod of the Evangelical Lutheran Church in America.

The church building was constructed during 1931-1932 and was a daring enterprise, in terms of its modern architecture and in terms of the economic times. It is an exceptional Art Deco building. The building is built of North Dakota brick. The church has a buttressed Art Deco bell tower that concludes with a ziggurat-like dome. The top portion of the tower was added in 1941.

The church was designed by the father and son architectural firm of Joseph Bell DeRemer (1871–1944) and Samuel Teel DeRemer (1894-1967).
