= South Junior High School (Grand Forks, North Dakota) =

- U.S. National Register of Historic Places
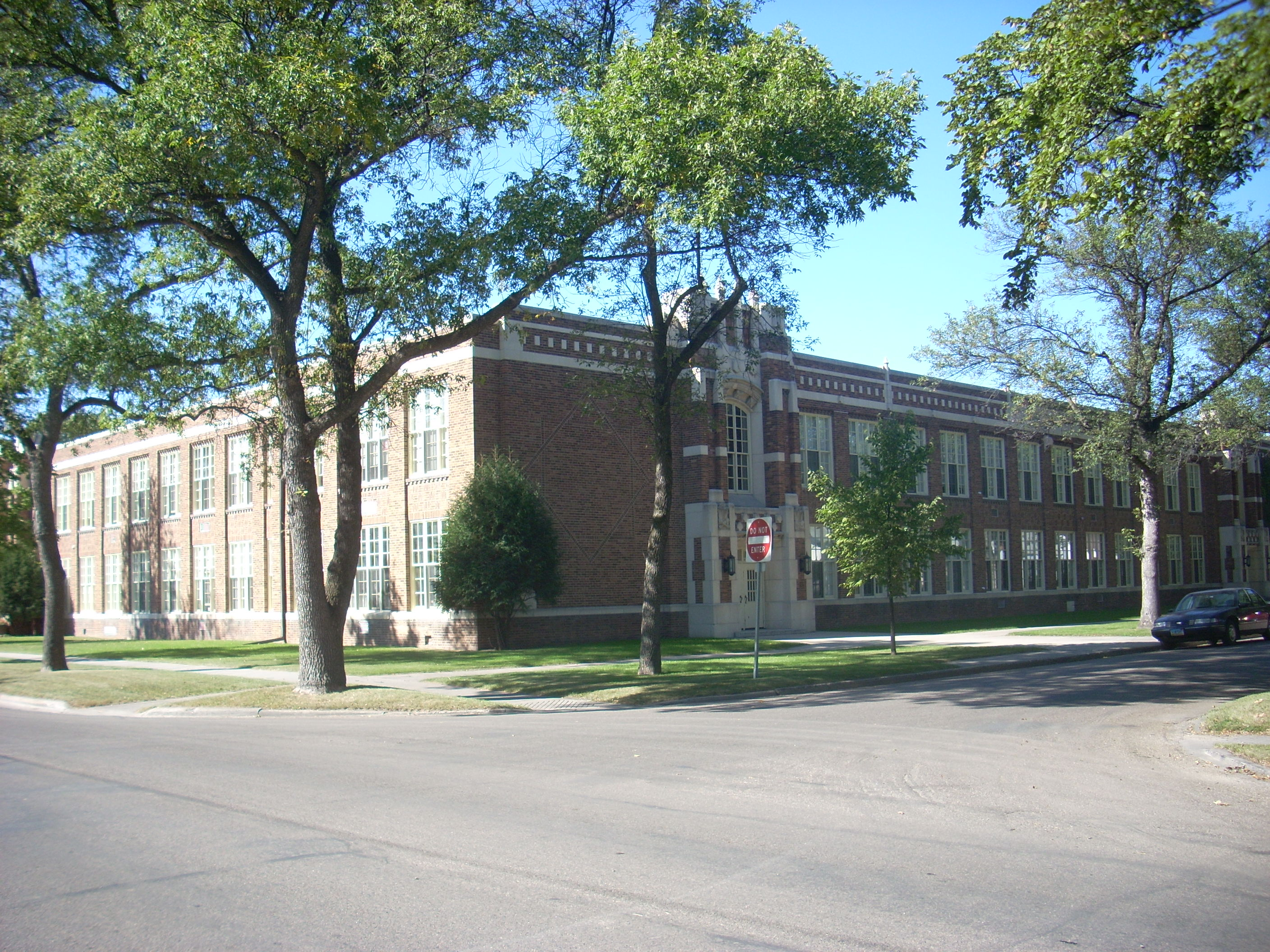
- School in 2009

- Location within North Dakota Location within the United States
- Location: 1224 Walnut St., Grand Forks, North Dakota
- Coordinates: 47°54′33″N 97°1′55″W
- Area: less than 1 acre (0.40 ha)
- Built: 1932
- Architect: Wells, Theodore B.; Thorvaldson-Johnson
- Architectural style: Late Gothic Revival
- NRHP reference No.: 99000274
- Added to NRHP: March 5, 1999

South Junior High School is a property in Grand Forks, North Dakota, United States, that was listed on the US National Register of Historic Places in 1999.

It includes Late Gothic Revival architecture.
