= Oxford House (Grand Forks, North Dakota) =

Historic house in North Dakota, United States

- U.S. National Register of Historic Places
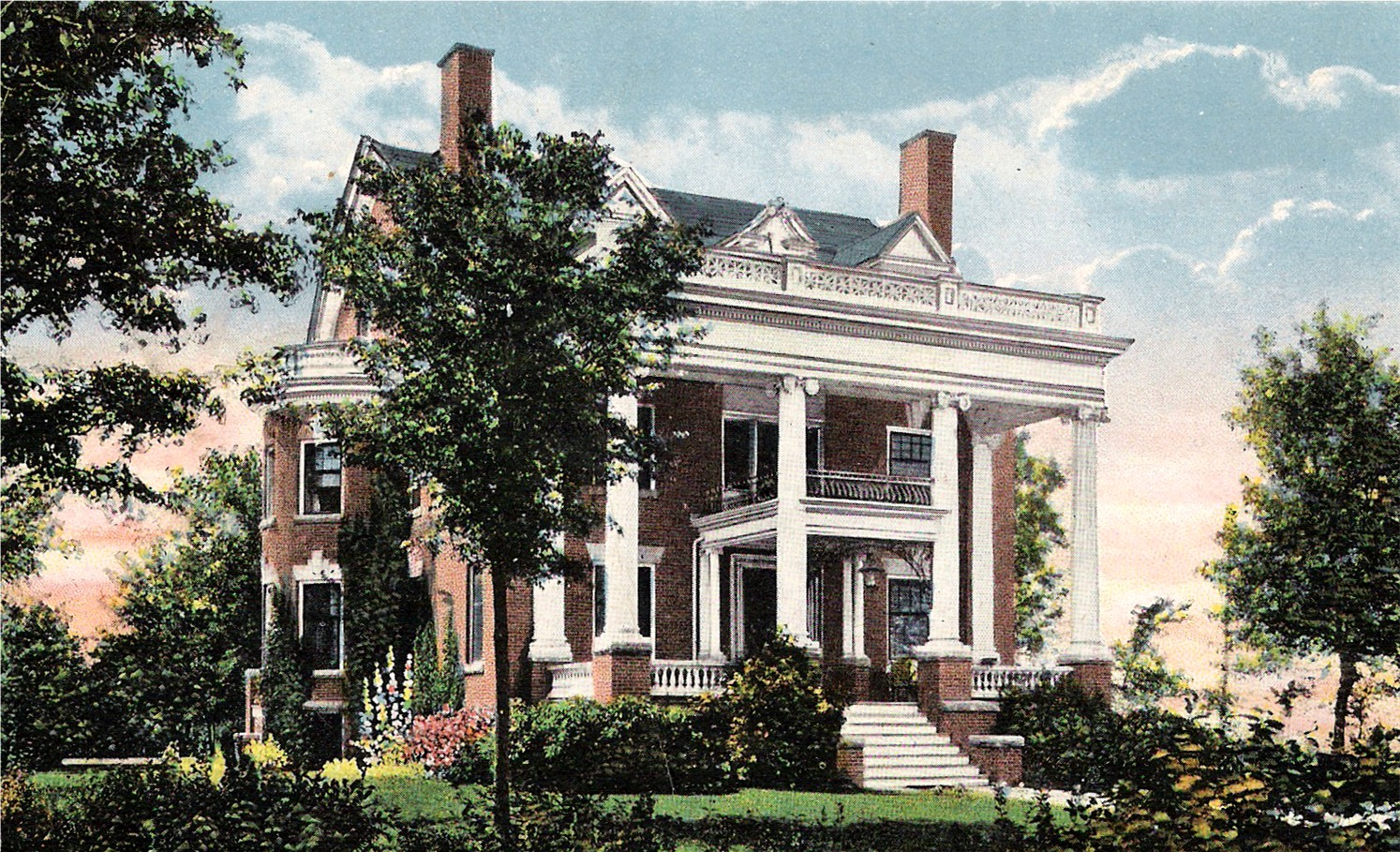
- Postcard image from c.1919

- Location within North Dakota Location within the United States
- Location: University of North Dakota campus, Grand Forks, North Dakota, United States
- Coordinates: 47°55′19″N 97°4′26″W
- Area: less than 1 acre (0.40 ha)
- Built: 1902
- Architect: Joseph Bell DeRemer
- Architectural style: Colonial Revival
- NRHP reference No.: 73001384
- Added to NRHP: May 2, 1973

Oxford House is a building on the University of North Dakota campus in Grand Forks, North Dakota, United States that was listed on the National Register of Historic Places in 1973.

When it was built in 1902, it was considered one of the most fashionable houses in the Northwest.

It was designed by architect Joseph Bell DeRemer in Colonial Revival style.
