= Mass media in Grand Forks, North Dakota =

The following is a list of media in Grand Forks, North Dakota, United States:

== Print ==
=== Daily ===
- Grand Forks Herald

=== Weekly ===
- The Exponent (located in East Grand Forks, Minnesota)
- High Plains Reader (published in Fargo, North Dakota)
- Tidbits of Grand Forks (Grand Forks, ND)

=== Other ===
- Dakota Student (published twice a week by students of the University of North Dakota during the school year and distributed for free)
- Red River Valley Women Today (published monthly by the Grand Forks Herald and available for free at area businesses and online)
- BBI International (publishes trade magazines and produces events)
- Biomass Magazine (published in print and online monthly by BBI International)
- Pellet Mill Magazine (published in print and online six times a year by BBI International)
- Biodiesel Magazine (published in print and online quarterly by BBI International)
- Ethanol Producer Magazine (published in print and online monthly by BBI International)
- North American Shale Magazine (published in print and online quarterly by BBI International)
- UAS Magazine (published quarterly online by BBI International)
- GRAND Lifestyle Magazine (published in print and online quarterly by BBI International)

== Television ==
Grand Forks is included in the Fargo market, which is the 120th largest TV market in the United States (as ranked by Nielsen). The only television stations that broadcast from studios in Grand Forks is WDAZ.

Channel	Callsign	Affiliation	Branding	Subchannels		Owner
(Virtual)	Callsign	Affiliation	Branding	Channel	Programming	Owner
2.1	KGFE	PBS	Prairie Public Television	2.2; 2.3; 2.4	World/Lifelong Learning; Minnesota Channel; PBS Kids	Prairie Public Television
4.1	KRDK	Cozi TV/MyNetworkTV	KRDK 4	4.2; 4.3; 4.4; 4.5; 4.6; 4.7; 4.8	BEK Sports; Grit; Escape; Bounce TV; Laff; Comet; Buzzr	Major Market Broadcasting
8.1	WDAZ	ABC	WDAZ	8.2; 8.3; 8.4	Justice Network; WDAY'Z Xtra; ION	Forum Communications
10.1	KBRR	FOX	KVRR	10.2	Antenna TV	Red River Broadcasting
11.1	KVLY	NBC	KVLY-TV 11	11.2; 11.3; 11.4	CBS (KXJB); MeTV; Circle	Gray Television
16.1	KCGE	PBS	Prairie Public Television	16.2; 16.3; 16.4	World/Lifelong Learning; Minnesota Channel; PBS Kids	Prairie Public Television
17	K18NT-D	3ABN	3ABN			3ABN
30.1	K30LR-D (KXJB-LD)	CBS	KX4	30.2; 30.3	CW+ Heroes & Icons	Gray Television

== Radio ==
Grand Forks is the 289th largest radio market, according to Arbitron.

=== AM radio ===
Frequency	Callsign	Nickname	Format	Owner	Web site
600	KSJB	KSJB 600	Classic Country	Chesterman Communications	
680	CJOB	Global News Radio 680 CJOB	News/Talk	Corus Entertainment	
740	KNFL	740 & 107.3 The Fan (ESPN Radio)	Sports	Midwest Communications	
790	KFGO	The Mighty 790 & 104.7 KFGO	News/Talk	Midwest Communications	
970	WDAY	WDAY 970	News/Talk	Great Plains Integrated Marketing	
990	CBW	CBC Radio One	News/Talk	Canadian Broadcasting Corporation	
1100	WZFG	AM 1100 The Flag	Talk	Great Plains Integrated Marketing	
1200	KFNW	Faith 1200	Christian	University of Northwestern - St. Paul	
1230	KTRF	KTRF Radio 1230	News/Talk	Thomas E. Ingstad	
1260	KROX	1260 KROX	News/Talk	Gopher Communications	
1310	KNOX	1310 & 107.9 KNOX	News/Talk	Leighton Broadcasting	
1370	KWTL	Real Presence Radio	Catholic	Real Presence Radio	
1440	KKXL	1440 The Fan	Sports	iHeartMedia	
1460	KKAQ	1460 Real Country	Classic Country	Thomas E. Ingstad	
1520	KMSR	99 KMSR	Sports	KMSR, Inc.	
1590	KGFK	Rock 95	Classic rock	Leighton Broadcasting	

=== FM radio ===
Frequency	Callsign	Nickname	Format	Owner	Web site
88.3	KEQQ-LP	KEQQ Radio	Educational Talk	Grand Forks Bible Study Group	
89.3	KUND	Prairie Public Radio	NPR, News/Classical	Prairie Public Radio	
90.1	KSRQ	Pioneer 90.1	Ampers, College	Northland Community & Technical College	
90.7	KFJM	Prairie Public Radio	NPR, Adult Album Alternative	Prairie Public Radio	
91.5	KQMN	Minnesota Public Radio	NPR, Classical	Minnesota Public Radio	
92.1	K221GU	1260 KROX	News/Talk	Gopher Communications	
92.5	K223DF	Real Presence Radio	Catholic	Real Presence Radio	
92.9	KKXL	XL93	Top 40 (CHR)	iHeartMedia	
94.1	KTRF	94.1 The Falls	Adult Hits	Thomas E. Ingstad	
94.7	KZGF	Z94.7	Top 40 (CHR)	Leighton Broadcasting	
95.3	K237ER	K-LOVE	Cont. Christian music	Educational Media Foundation	
95.7	K239BG	Rock 95	Classic rock	Leighton Broadcasting	
96.1	KQHT	96.1 The Fox	Classic hits	iHeartMedia	
97.1	KYCK	97 KYCK	Country	Leighton Broadcasting	
97.5	K248DH	Rock 95	Classic rock	Leighton Broadcasting	
99.3	KKDQ	North Country 99.3	Country	Thomas E. Ingstad	
100.3	KSNR	100.3 Cat Country	Country	iHeartMedia	
101.3	KOBT-LP	3ABN	Christian	Grand Forks Christian Brd.	
102.7	KNTN	Minnesota Public Radio	NPR, News/Talk	Minnesota Public Radio	
103.3	K277DN	1310 & 107.9 KNOX	News/Talk	Leighton Broadcasting	
104.3	KZLT	104.3 Cities FM	Adult Contemporary	Leighton Broadcasting	
104.9	K285BG	Your Q FM	Cont. Christian music	Shine The Light, Inc.	
105.5	KMAV	KMAV 105.5 FM	Country	KMSR, Inc.	
105.7	K289CE	1260 KROX	News/Talk	Gopher Communications	
106.5	KRJB	KRJB 106.5	Country	R&J Broadcasting	
107.5	KJKJ	KJ108	Active Rock	iHeartMedia	
107.9	K300BG	1310 & 107.9 KNOX	News/Talk	Leighton Broadcasting	

== See also ==
- List of television stations in North Dakota
