= Mass media in Alexandria, Minnesota =

The following is a list of mass media in Alexandria, Minnesota, United States.

== Television ==
Analog Channel	Digital Channel	Call sign	Name	Network	Owner
None	7.1 (ATSC RF 7)	KCCO	WCCO	CBS	CBS Corporation
None	10.1 (ATSC RF 10)	KWCM-TV	Pioneer Public Television	PBS	West Central Minnesota Educational Television Company
None	10.2 (ATSC RF 10)	KWCM-TV	Pioneer Public Television	Create	West Central Minnesota Educational Television Company
None	10.3 (ATSC RF 10)	KWCM-TV	Pioneer Public Television	Minnesota Channel	West Central Minnesota Educational Television Company
None	10.4 (ATSC RF 10)	KWCM-TV	Pioneer Public Television	PBS	West Central Minnesota Educational Television Company
None	10.5 (ATSC RF 10)	KWCM-TV	Pioneer Public Television	PBS Kids	West Central Minnesota Educational Television Company
None	42.1 (ATSC RF 24)	KSAX	KSAX/KSTP-TV	ABC	Hubbard Broadcasting
16	None	K16CO-D	45	Independent	Selective TV, Inc.
18	None	K18DG	KARE 11	NBC	Selective TV, Inc.
20	None	K20AC-D	FOX 9	Fox Broadcasting Company	Selective TV, Inc.
21	None	521GN	Shaw TV	Shaw TV	Selective TV, Inc.
26	None	K26CL-D	The CW	The CW Television Network	Selective TV, Inc.
32	None	K32EB-D	FamilyNet	FamilyNet	Selective TV, Inc.
34	None	K34AF-D	ION	ION Media Networks	Selective TV, Inc.
48	None	K48DV	MY29	My Network TV	Selective TV, Inc.
50	None	K50DB	The Weather Channel	The Weather Channel	Selective TV, Inc.
51	None	K51JY	C-SPAN	C-SPAN	Selective TV, Inc.

== Radio ==
=== FM ===
Frequency	Call sign	Name	Format	Owner
88.9 FM	KNSR	Minnesota Public Radio/NPR	News/Talk	American Public Media Group (via Minnesota Public Radio)
90.1 FM	KSJR	Minnesota Public Radio/NPR	News/Talk	American Public Media Group (via Minnesota Public Radio)
90.9 FM	K215BL	Minnesota Public Radio/NPR	Classical	American Public Media Group (via Minnesota Public Radio)
92.3 FM	KXRA-FM	KX92	Classic rock	Paradis Broadcasting Inc
94.3 FM	KULO	COOL 94.3	Oldies	Paul Bunyan Broadcasting
94.9 FM	KMXK	MIX 94.9	Hot Adult Contemporary	Townsquare Media
95.7 FM	KKOK	KKOK	Country	Iowa City Broadcasting Company
96.5 FM	KJJK-FM	KJ Country	Country	Jerry Papenfuss
97.3 FM	KRVY	97-3 The Kangaroo	Variety Hits	Iowa City Broadcasting Company, Inc.
98.1 FM	WWJO	98 Country	Country	Townsquare Media
99.3 FM	KXRZ	Z99	Hot Adult Contemporary	Paradis Broadcasting Inc
99.7 FM	KXDL	Hot Rod Radio	Classic Hits	Prairie Broadcasting Company, Inc.
100.3 FM	K262AT	1490 News Talk Radio	News/Talk	Paradis Broadcasting Inc
100.7 FM	KIKV-FM	100.7 KIK FM	Country	Paul Bunyan Broadcasting
102.5 FM	KQIC	Q102	Hot Adult Contemporary	Lakeland Broadcasting Company
103.9 FM	KBHL	Praise FM	Worship Music	Christian Heritage Broadcasting
104.7 FM	KCLD	104.7 KCLD	Top 40/CHR	Leighton Broadcasting
105.9 FM	KKWS	Superstation K106	Country	Paul Bunyan Broadcasting
106.7 FM	WJJY	106.7 WJJY	Adult Contemporary	Paul Bunyan Broadcasting
107.1 FM	KMGK	Magic 107	Smooth Jazz/Soft AC/Oldies	Branstock Communications

=== AM ===
Frequency	Call sign	Name	Format	Owner
660 AM	WBHR	660 The Bear	Sports/Sports Talk	Tri-County Broadcasting
1020 AM	KJJK	Family 1020	Contemporary Christian Music	Jerry Papenfuss
1400 AM	KEYL	Hometown Radio	Country	Prairie Broadcasting Company
1490 AM	KXRA	1490 News Talk Radio	News/Talk	Paradis Broadcasting Inc
