= KJJK =

KJJK may refer to:

- KJJK (AM), a radio station (1020 AM) licensed to Fergus Falls, Minnesota, United States
- KJJK-FM, a radio station (96.5 FM) licensed to Fergus Falls, Minnesota, United States
