= KXRA =

KXRA may refer to:

- KXRA (AM), a radio station (1490 AM) licensed to Alexandria, Minnesota, United States
- KXRA-FM, a radio station (92.3 FM) licensed to Alexandria, Minnesota, United States
