= KWNO =

KWNO may refer to:

- KWNO (AM), a radio station (1230 AM) licensed to Winona, Minnesota, United States
- KWMN, a radio station (99.3 FM) licensed to Rushford, Minnesota, United States, which held the KWNO-FM call sign from 1991 until 2019
