= KKXL =

KKXL may refer to:

- KKXL (AM), a radio station (1440 AM) licensed to Grand Forks, North Dakota, United States
- KKXL-FM, a radio station (92.9 FM) licensed to Grand Forks, North Dakota, United States
