= Alexandria media =

Alexandria media may refer to:

- Media in Alexandria, Minnesota
- Media in Alexandria, Virginia
