= KRIV =

KRIV may refer to:

- KRIV (TV), a television station (channel 26) licensed to serve Houston, Texas, United States
- KRIV-FM, a radio station (101.1 FM) licensed to serve Winona, Minnesota, United States
- March Air Reserve Base (ICAO code KRIV)
