= KQHT =

Radio station in Crookston, Minnesota–Grand Forks, North Dakota

Coordinates: 47.845°N 96.840°W

- Crookston, Minnesota; United States
- Broadcast area: Grand Forks, North Dakota
- Frequency: 96.1 MHz
- Branding: 96.1 The Fox

Programming
- Format: Classic hits
- Affiliations: North Dakota Fighting Hawks; Premiere Networks

Ownership
- Owner: iHeartMedia, Inc.; (iHM Licenses, LLC)
- Sister stations: KJKJ, KKXL, KKXL-FM, KSNR

History
- First air date: 1985
- Former call signs: KLZC (1985–1986)

Technical information
- Licensing authority: FCC
- Facility ID: 9657
- Class: C1
- ERP: 100,000 watts
- HAAT: 126 meters

Links
- Public license information: Public file; LMS
- Webcast: Listen live (via iHeartRadio)
- Website: 961thefox.iheart.com

KQHT (96.1 FM, "96.1 The Fox") is a radio station broadcasting a classic hits format serving Grand Forks, North Dakota, that is licensed to Crookston, Minnesota. It began broadcasting in 1985. The station is owned by iHeartMedia, Inc. KQHT primarily competes with Leighton Broadcasting's classic rock 1590 KGFK/95.7 K239BG/97.5 K248DH "Rock 95".

KQHT also broadcasts University of North Dakota men's ice hockey and football games as the flagship station, while sister station KSNR broadcasts University of North Dakota men's and women's basketball home games, and sister station KKXL-AM broadcasts University of North Dakota women's ice hockey.

== Programming ==
In addition to its music programming, the station broadcasts play-by-play coverage of University of North Dakota football and men's hockey games. KQHT also broadcasts Premiere Networks' Casey Kasem's American Top 40 on Sunday mornings.

== History ==
The station began life in 1985 as KLZC, and become KQHT in 1986. KQHT began as a Top 40 station in 1986 as "Magic 96" competing with XL93 (KKXL-FM/92.9). In 1998 it changed to an adult contemporary format. It renamed itself "KQ96" in 1996, and "Mix 96.1" in 1998. In the late 1980s, the on-air talent included Ross Holland (Fast Eddie Fingers) Program Manager, Steve Gunner (future Program Manager), Rick Acker, Tim Burns, and Ron Phillips (The Iceman). During that early 1990s battle with XL93, there were personalities like Magic Mark & Paul Braun, Josh Jones, Shelley Carr, "Smilin'" Wade Williams, "Jammin" Jay Murphy, Denny "Crash" Shields, Michael Knight (Mike Cruise), Pat Ebertz, Bobby Brady, Minimum Wage Mike, Harry Callahan, Kim Cooley, Jack Hammer, and Nick Logan.

96.1 The Fox logo from 2004-2015

In 2000, Clear Channel bought KQHT and several other radio stations in Grand Forks. KQHT changed its format to classic hits (a hybrid of classic rock and oldies music formats) calling itself as "96.1 The Fox". Clear Channel also got a contract with the University of North Dakota to broadcast Fighting Sioux basketball, hockey, and football games. Hockey and football games are broadcast on KQHT while basketball games are aired on sister station KSNR 100.3. The slogan was changed from "Classic Hits" to "World Class Rock" in 2004, and programming evolved towards a broad-based classic rock format. The station shifted to an updated classic hits version of the KSNR "Kool 100.3" Oldies format after KSNR changed from oldies to country in 2005. When competitor KNOX-FM/94.7 changed from classic country to classic rock in 2007, The Fox shifted back to a classic rock format. KQHT "96.1 The Fox" switched back to classic hits in 2010, with the "Your Station for the Classics" slogan, after KNOX-FM/94.7 changed from classic rock to Top 40 (CHR) as KZGF "Z94.7" to compete with sister station heritage Top 40 (CHR) KKXL-FM/92.9 "XL93".
