= KGFK =

KGFK may refer to:

- KGFK (AM), a radio station (1590 AM) licensed to serve East Grand Forks, Minnesota, United States
- Grand Forks International Airport (ICAO code KGFK)
