= KXRZ =

- Alexandria, Minnesota; United States
- Broadcast area: Douglas County, Minnesota
- Frequency: 99.3 MHz
- Branding: Z99

Programming
- Format: Hot adult contemporary
- Affiliations: Westwood One

Ownership
- Owner: Leighton Broadcasting; (Leighton Radio Holdings, Inc.)
- Sister stations: KXRA-FM, KXRA

History
- First air date: April 2, 1984 (as KSTQ)
- Former call signs: KSTQ (1983–1999)

Technical information
- Licensing authority: FCC
- Facility ID: 6651
- Class: C3
- ERP: 12,000 watts
- HAAT: 85 meters

Links
- Public license information: Public file; LMS
- Webcast: Listen Live
- Website: Z99 Website

KXRZ (99.3 FM, "Z99") is a hot adult contemporary formatted radio station in Alexandria, Minnesota, United States. "Z99" is owned by Leighton Broadcasting which also owns KXRA-FM and KXRA.

The station airs Westwood One's Hot AC format at all times besides the morning show. Every Sunday, Calvary Lutheran Church airs their 8:30am worship service at 10:30am.

== History ==
=== Lakes 99.3 (KSTQ) ===
The station first signed on the air on April 2, 1984, using the call sign KSTQ at the 99.3 MHz frequency. The station was initially owned by Branstock Communications and operated under the moniker "The Lakes 99.3". In December 1998, the FCC canceled the license of three radio stations: KSTQ Alexandria, KMSR Sauk Centre, and KMGK Glenwood.. The station's license was eventually acquired by Paradis Broadcasting of Alexandria, Inc., which changed the call letters to KXRZ in 2000.

=== Z99 (KXRZ) ===
In late 2019, it was announced that KXRZ, along with its sister stations KXRA (AM) and KXRA-FM, would be sold to Leighton Enterprises, Inc. (Leighton Broadcasting) of St. Cloud. The purchase agreement was signed in September 2019, and the deal closed in February 2020.

The sale marked Leighton Broadcasting's expansion into its sixth market in Minnesota, joining its operations in St. Cloud, Detroit Lakes, Fergus Falls, Perham, and Winona. The purchase price for the three-station cluster was reported to be $3.4 million. Following the acquisition, Leighton Broadcasting stated its intention to keep all local programming and retain all existing employees, including former owner Brett Paradis as the General Manager. The station's current offices are located in Alexandria at 1312 Broadway St.
