= KZGF =

Contemporary hit radio station in Grand Forks, North Dakota

Coordinates: 47.814°N 96.930°W

- Grand Forks, North Dakota; United States
- Broadcast area: Grand Forks, North Dakota
- Frequency: 94.7 MHz
- Branding: Z94.7

Programming
- Format: Commercial; Top 40 (CHR)

Ownership
- Owner: Leighton Broadcasting
- Sister stations: KGFK, KNOX, KYCK, KZLT-FM

History
- First air date: October 17, 1971
- Former call signs: KYTN (1967–1988); KNOX-FM (1988–2011)
- Call sign meaning: Z94.7 Grand Forks

Technical information
- Licensing authority: FCC
- Facility ID: 54593
- Class: C1
- ERP: 100,000 watts
- HAAT: 104 meters

Links
- Public license information: Public file; LMS
- Webcast: Listen Live
- Website: z947.com

KZGF (94.7 FM, "Z94.7") is a radio station broadcasting a Top 40 (CHR) format serving Grand Forks, North Dakota. It first began broadcasting in the 1967 under the call sign KYTN and used the call sign KNOX-FM for several years until 2011. The station is currently owned by Leighton Broadcasting, and competes with iHeartMedia's 92.9 KKXL-FM "XL93". The on-air schedule and personalities almost mirror Leighton sister station KCLD-FM, including the Playhouse Mornings with Kat and JJ Holiday, Alayna Jaye on mid-days, Derek Lee on afternoons and the live syndicated Liveline with Mason Kelter at night.

== History ==
94.7 first signed on October 17, 1971 as KYTN, and aired a beautiful music format as "Kitten 95". The station later tweaked to adult contemporary as "Lite Rock 95" in 1980, which lasted until May 1984 when it flipped to a CHR/Top 40 format as "Y95", competing with KKXL-FM/92.9 "XL93".

"Y-95" later flipped to album oriented rock (the predecessor to the classic rock format) as "Power 95" with the KNOX-FM call sign in 1988. KNOX-FM later became "Laser 95", until flipping to oldies in 1990 as "Kool 94.7". The station later flipped to a satellite fed classic country format as "Real Country 94.7" in 1995, when KSNR adopted the "Kool 100.3" moniker to its oldies format. In 2002, it switched to a locally originated classic country as "The Rooster 94.7".

On September 27, 2007, the station returned to rock with the "Power" moniker as "Power 94.7" with a classic rock format, to compete with Clear Channel's classic rock KQHT "96.1 The Fox" and heritage active rock KJKJ/107.5 "KJ108". The previous classic country format as "The Rooster" was moved to KCNN/1590.

In December 2009, the station rebranded itself as "94.7 Rocks" and added 1990s rock to its classic rock format. On August 23, 2010, the station began stunting as "94.7 Santa FM" under a purely Christmas Music format. On August 25, 2010, the station flipped to "Z94.7" under a CHR/Top 40 format and changed the call sign to KZGF in February 2011. The station began with a Rhythmic CHR/Top 40 lean, but shifted towards a Mainstream CHR/Top 40 format in October 2011. "Z94.7" competes with Clear Channel's heritage CHR/Top 40 KKXL-FM/92.9 "XL93".

== Previous logo ==
former Power 94.7 logo
