= Hamm Brewing Company Beer Depot =

- U.S. National Register of Historic Places
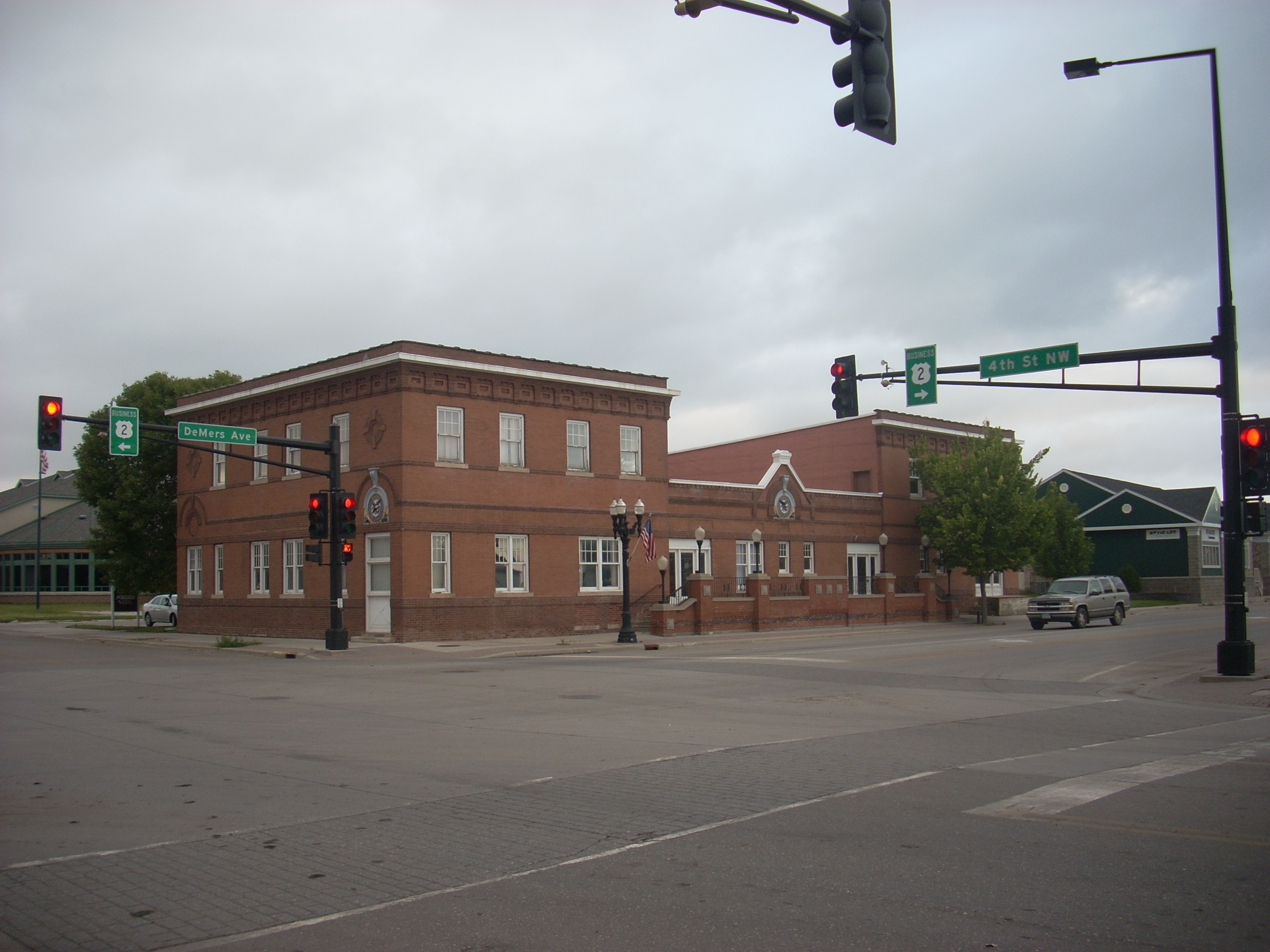

- Location within Minnesota Location within the United States
- Location: 401 DeMers Ave., East Grand Forks, Minnesota
- Coordinates: 47°55′48″N 97°1′27″W
- Area: less than one acre
- Built: 1907
- NRHP reference No.: 84001651
- Added to NRHP: September 20, 1984

The Hamm Brewing Company Beer Depot in East Grand Forks, Minnesota, United States, is a warehouse listed on the National Register of Historic Places. Hamm's Brewery built their first cold-storage warehouse in East Grand Forks in 1890. In 1897, they moved to a larger depot, and then in 1907, they built the present building, which backed up to a railroad spur. The growing use of refrigerator cars at the end of the 19th century made it possible for more small breweries to ship their beer to larger markets. The Hamm's depot was one of six such cold-storage warehouses on DeMers Avenue in 1909.
