= KNOX (AM) =

- Grand Forks, North Dakota; United States
- Frequency: 1310 kHz
- Branding: News Radio 1310 & 107.9 KNOX

Programming
- Format: News/talk
- Affiliations: ABC News Radio; Compass Media Networks; Westwood One

Ownership
- Owner: Leighton Broadcasting; (Leighton Enterprises, Inc.)
- Sister stations: KGFK; KYCK; KZGF; KZLT-FM

History
- First air date: September 17, 1947
- Former frequencies: 1400 kHz (1947–1954)

Technical information
- Licensing authority: FCC
- Facility ID: 54592
- Class: B
- Power: 5,000 watts
- Transmitter coordinates: 47°50′38.9″N 97°1′31.3″W
- Translators: 107.9 K300BG (Grand Forks); 103.3 K277DN (Grand Forks)

Links
- Public license information: Public file; LMS
- Webcast: Listen live
- Website: www.knoxradio.com

KNOX (1310 kHz, "News Radio 1310 & 107.9 KNOX") is an AM radio station broadcasting a news/talk format in Grand Forks, North Dakota. The station is owned by Leighton Broadcasting. KNOX also rebroadcasts on translators K300BG (107.9 FM) and K277DN (103.3 FM) in Grand Forks.

The station broadcasts ABC News Radio updates. The station broadcasts local high school hockey, football, and basketball games on occasion, and Minnesota Timberwolves basketball, Minnesota Wild hockey, and Minnesota Twins baseball games.

== History ==
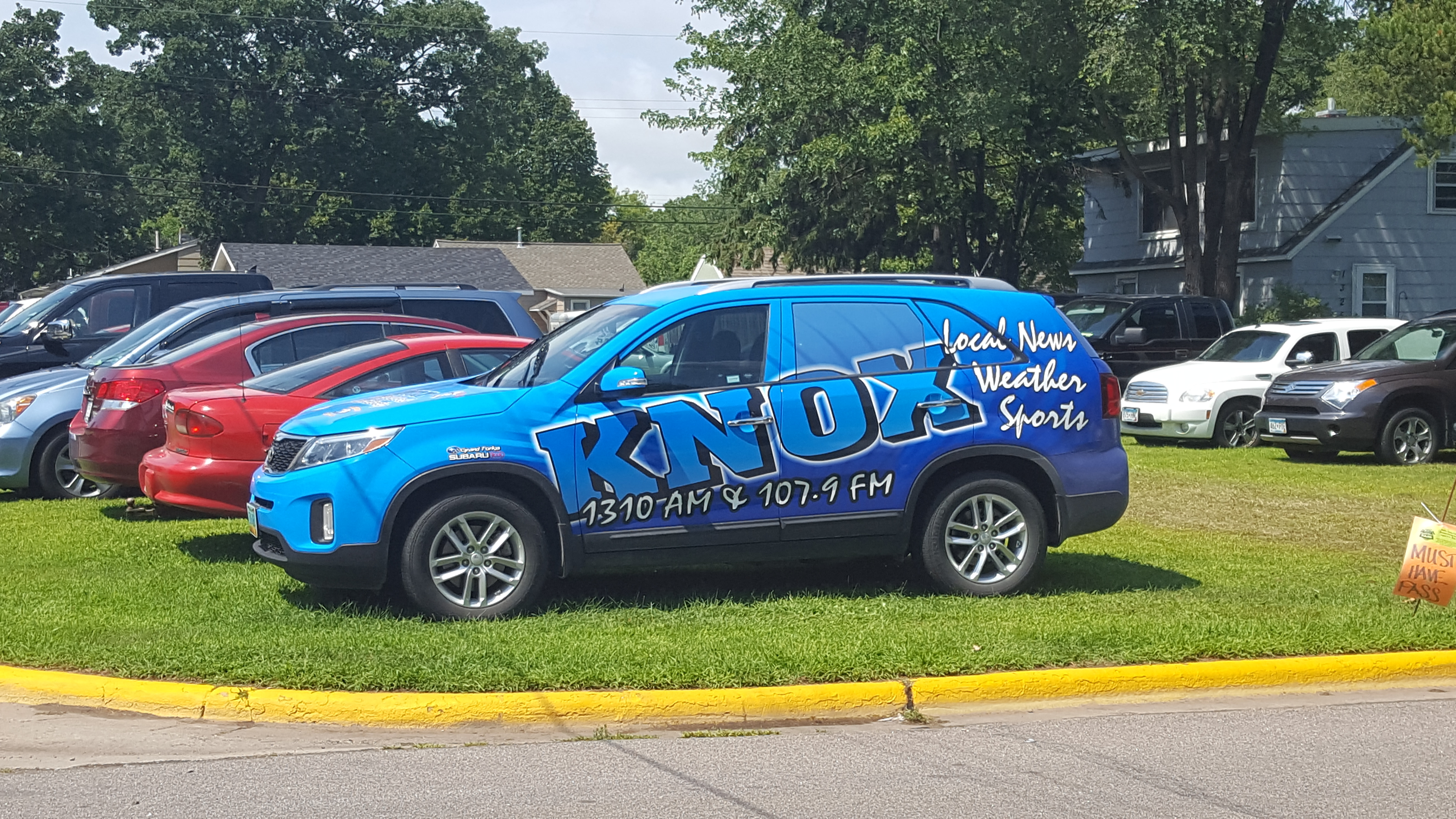
KNOX's station vehicle, spotted in Sauk Rapids, Minnesota.

KNOX signed on September 17, 1947 on 1400 kHz, and became an affiliate of the Mutual Broadcasting System. The station changed its frequencies in the 1950s. KNOX became a full service format blending music, news, talk, and radio dramas. It later became a Top 40 station, and changed to a mainly news/talk format in the 1980s. The lineup of local on-air hosts has undergone several changes since then and has included names like Jim Bollman, Scott Hennen, and Jarrod Thomas.

News Talk 1310 KNOX's local news team consists of Doug Barrett and Pat Sweeney.

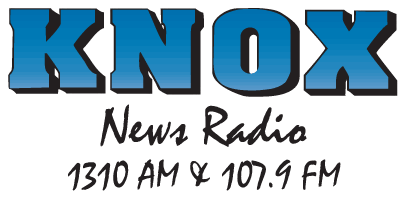
Logo before 103.3 translator sign on

On January 11, 2012, KNOX began broadcasting on FM translator K300BG (107.9 FM) in Grand Forks. K300BG had been broadcasting KGFK (AM 1590), which moved to 95.7 FM as it has a stronger signal in Grand Forks. In May 2021, second FM translator K277DN (103.3 FM) in Grand Forks signed on for better rural coverage from the KZLT/KZGF transmitter tower, including coverage of Crookston, while K300BG continues to cover the immediate Grand Forks–East Grand Forks area. K277DN also has stronger coverage than K300BG in some parts of Grand Forks–East Grand Forks due to less adjacent channel interference from full-power KJKJ "KJ108" and co-channel interference from Fargo's KPFX "107.9 The Fox".

== Awards ==
The station was a finalist for the 2008 Crystal Radio Award for Excellence in Community Service awarded by the National Association of Broadcasters.

== Translators ==
KNOX broadcasts on the following FM translators:

Call sign	Frequency	City of license	FID	ERP (W)	Class	FCC info
K300BG	107.9 FM	Grand Forks, North Dakota	150152	250	D	LMS
K277DN	103.3 FM	Grand Forks, North Dakota	202226	250	D	LMS
