= KSNR =

Radio station in Fisher, Minnesota–Grand Forks, North Dakota

Coordinates: 47.977°N 96.612°W

Fisher, Minnesota; United States
- Broadcast area: Grand Forks, North Dakota
- Frequency: 100.3 MHz
- Branding: 100.3 Cat Country

Programming
- Format: Country
- Affiliations: Premiere Networks

Ownership
- Owner: iHeartMedia; (iHM Licenses, LLC)
- Sister stations: KJKJ, KKXL, KKXL-FM, KQHT

History
- First air date: 1976
- Former call signs: KOSN (1976–1983)

Technical information
- Licensing authority: FCC
- Facility ID: 73625
- Class: C1
- ERP: 100,000 watts
- HAAT: 172 meters (564 ft)

Links
- Public license information: Public file; LMS
- Webcast: Listen live (via iHeartRadio)
- Website: thecatfm.iheart.com

KSNR (100.3 FM, "100.3 Cat Country") is a commercial radio station serving the Grand Forks, North Dakota area broadcasting a country music format. Licensed to Fisher, Minnesota, KSNR first began broadcasting in 1976 under the call sign KOSN in Thief River Falls. The station is currently owned by iHeartMedia. The station's main competitor is Leighton Broadcasting's 97 KYCK (97.1 FM).

KSNR also broadcasts University of North Dakota men's and women's basketball home games, while sister station KQHT "96.1 The Fox" broadcasts University of North Dakota men's ice hockey and football games as the flagship station, and sister station KKXL-AM "1440 The Fan" broadcasts University of North Dakota women's ice hockey.

== History ==
The station began life at 99.3 FM as KOSN in Thief River Falls, Minnesota in 1976. KOSN broadcast only 3,000 watts. The station changed call letters to KSNR in 1983 as it flipped to an oldies format, concentrating on 50s and 60s "Golden Oldies" format. After upgrading to 100,000 watts at 100.3 FM in 1987, the station attracted listeners in Grand Forks, North Dakota, since the signal could be heard on most radios and KSNR was the only oldies station in the area until 1990.

KSNR later became "Kool 100.3" in 1995 from studios in Grand Forks after KNOX-FM flipped from Oldies as "Kool 94.7" to Classic Country as "Real Country 94.7", and KSNR as "Kool 100.3" also began playing 1970s era music after being sold. KSNR also played Christmas music from Thanksgiving Day to Christmas Day annually until the format change in 2005. In 2000, Clear Channel Communications bought out KSNR and several other stations, and the format was changed to play 1960s and 1970s era music. It also became the flagship station for University of North Dakota basketball play-by-play broadcasts.

Kool 100.3 switched to country music as "Cat Country" in October 2005, competing with Leighton Broadcasting's heritage country station KYCK and classic country station KNOX-FM "Rooster 94.7". In 2006, sister station classic rock KQHT "96.1 The Fox" began shifting towards to an updated classic hits version of the former "Kool 100.3" oldies format.

In 2005, KSNR changed its city of license from Thief River Falls to Fisher, which would allow it to move its transmitter tower closer to Grand Forks in the future.

In the fall of 2012, all local personalities were removed from Cat Country in favor of Bobby Bones Show in the morning and Premium Choice radio personalities in all other dayparts. The previous local morning show was moved to sister station KQHT "96.1 The Fox", which carries an updated classic hits version of the former "Kool 100.3" oldies format. In 2016, Cat Country brought back some local personalities previously heard on the station.

On October 29, 2018, it was announced that, as iHeartMedia would lose its grandfathered ownership limits in the Brunswick and Grand Forks markets as part of its bankruptcy restructuring, the company would place KSNR and WHFX into the newly formed Sun & Snow Station Trust, under the oversight of former Backyard Broadcasting CEO Barry Drake, as preparation for an eventual sale of the signals. On December 23, 2020, iHeart filed to reclaim KSNR from the Sun & Snow Station Trust; the re-assignment of the license was consummated on March 29, 2021.
