= KGSL =

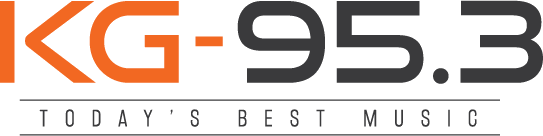
- Winona, Minnesota; United States
- Broadcast area: Winona, Minnesota
- Frequency: 95.3 MHz
- Branding: KG-95.3

Programming
- Format: Top 40 (CHR)
- Affiliations: Compass Media Networks; Premiere Networks

Ownership
- Owner: Leighton Broadcasting; (Leighton Radio Holdings, Inc.)
- Sister stations: KHWK, KWMN, KRIV-FM, KWNO

History
- First air date: August 14, 1971 (as KAGE-FM)
- Former call signs: KAGE-FM (1971–2015)

Technical information
- Licensing authority: FCC
- Facility ID: 33277
- Class: C3
- ERP: 11,000 watts
- HAAT: 151 meters
- Transmitter coordinates: 44°2′31″N 91°40′47″W

Links
- Public license information: Public file; LMS
- Webcast: Listen Live
- Website: winonaradio.com

KGSL (95.3 FM, "KG-95.3") is a radio station broadcasting a Top 40 (CHR) format. Licensed to Winona, Minnesota, United States, the station features programming from Compass Media Networks and Premiere Networks.

It is owned by Leighton Broadcasting, through licensee Leighton Radio Holdings, Inc., and is located at 752 Bluffview Circle, with its other sister stations.

KGSL was previously licensed as KAGE (FM) (not to be confused with KAGE (AM)), and owned by James B. Goetz.
