= KHWK (AM) =

- Winona, Minnesota; United States
- Broadcast area: Winona, Minnesota
- Frequency: 1380 kHz
- Branding: Real Country

Programming
- Format: Country music
- Affiliations: ABC News Radio; Real Country (Westwood One); Minnesota Vikings

Ownership
- Owner: Leighton Broadcasting; (Leighton Radio Holdings, Inc.)
- Sister stations: KGSL, KWMN, KRIV-FM, KWNO

History
- First air date: 1957
- Former call signs: KAGE (1957–2019)

Technical information
- Licensing authority: FCC
- Facility ID: 33276
- Class: D
- Power: 2,200 watts day; 28 watts night
- Transmitter coordinates: 44°2′8″N 91°37′8″W
- Translator: 101.5 K268DJ (Winona)

Links
- Public license information: Public file; LMS
- Webcast: Listen Live
- Website: https://winonaradio.com/real-country-home/

KHWK (1380 kHz) is an AM radio station broadcasting a country music format. Licensed to Winona, Minnesota, United States, the station features programming from ABC News Radio and Westwood One.

It is owned by Leighton Broadcasting, through licensee Leighton Radio Holdings, Inc., and is located at 752 Bluffview Circle, with its other sister stations.

It was originally on 1570 kHz and moved to 1380 kHz in 1958.
