= Kurt Knoff =

American football player (born 1954)

No. 25
- Position: Safety

Personal information
- Born: April 6, 1954 (age 72); East Grand Forks, Minnesota, U.S.
- Listed height: 6 ft 2 in (1.88 m)
- Listed weight: 191 lb (87 kg)

Career information
- High school: East Grand Forks
- College: Kansas
- NFL draft: 1976: 2nd round, 43rd overall pick

Career history
- Denver Broncos (1976); Houston Oilers (1977–1978); Minnesota Vikings (1979–1982)

Awards and highlights
- Second-team All-American (1975); 3× First-team All-Big Eight (1973, 1974, 1975)

Career NFL statistics
- Interceptions: 11
- Sacks: 1
- Fumble recoveries: 1
- Stats at Pro Football Reference

Kurt L. Knoff is an American former professional football player who was a safety in the National Football League (NFL) for the Denver Broncos, Houston Oilers and the Minnesota Vikings. He played college football for the Kansas Jayhawks.

A graduate of East Grand Forks Senior High School in East Grand Forks, Minnesota, Knoff was named the Minnesota High School Athlete of the Year in 1972. He attended the University of Kansas, excelling in football. He was a 1975 All-American, who also played both baseball and basketball for the Jayhawks. He was named to KU's All-Time Best Football Team by the Lawrence Journal-World.

One incident associated with Kurt Knoff is a play he made known as "The Hit". In a game against Oklahoma State at Lawrence in '74 Knoff came from the defensive backfield running full speed. Alfred Nelms was also running full speed up the side-line as he had swept around the defensive line of KU and appeared headed for a touchdown, when suddenly Knoff bolted up the field and ran head on into Nelms causing them both to go unconscious. They both got up shortly after that and Knoff played out the remainder of the game.

Selected in the second round of the 1976 NFL draft by the Denver Broncos, he did not sign with the team due to health concerns related to his knee. He eventually signed with the Houston Oilers, and played for the team in 1977 and 1978. He was picked up by the Minnesota Vikings during the 1979 season, and intercepted a pass on his very first play with the team. Knoff spent a total of four years with the Vikings, retiring before the start of the 1983 season.

During his professional football career, Knoff spent his summer pursuing an MBA degree from the University of Kansas. He was able to parlay this degree into a post-football career as a commercial real estate broker in Minneapolis – Saint Paul

== Sources ==
- Ballew, Bill. Tough Enough to be Vikings: Minnesota's Purple Pride from A to Z. Asheville, North Carolina: Old Norse Publishing, 1999. (page 192)
- Black, Sam. "Preparation Pays Off for Former Viking Knoff." Minneapolis/St. Paul Business Journal. June 21, 2004
- Toplikar, Dave. "KU's All-Time Best Football Team." Lawrence Journal-World

https://www.grandforksherald.com/sports/2094149-golden-years-big-time-run-began-40-years-ago== External links==

- Kurt Knoff Career Statistics from databasefootball.com
- "KU's All-Time Best Football Team" from the Lawrence Journal-World
- "Preparation Pays Off for Former Viking Knoff" from the Minneapolis/St. Paul Business Journal, June 21, 2004
