= Sacred Heart High School (East Grand Forks, Minnesota) =

Private, coeducational school in East Grand Forks, Minnesota, United States

Sacred Heart School
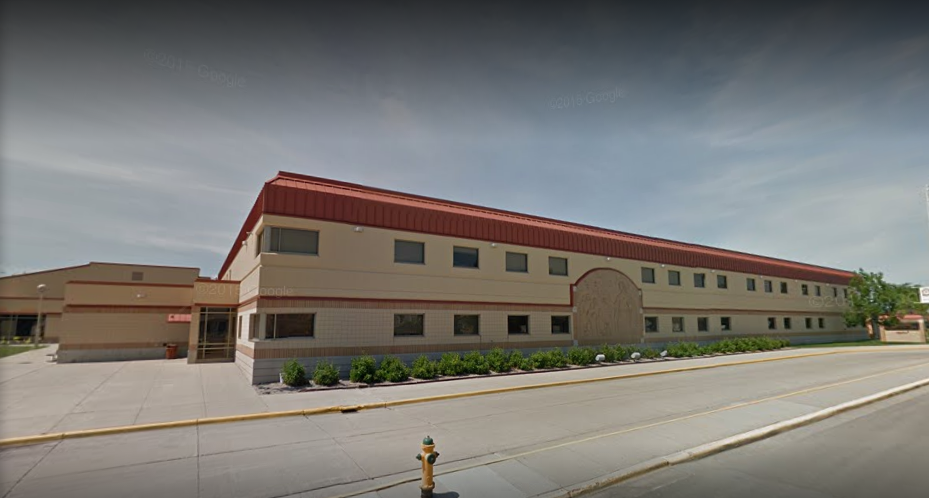

Location
- 200 Third Street NW; East Grand Forks, (Polk County), Minnesota 56721; United States; 47°55′39″N 97°1′23″W

Information
- Type: Private, Coeducational, Parochial
- Religious affiliation: Roman Catholic
- Established: 1912
- Superintendent: Matt Schmitz
- Principal: Nevin Lubarski
- Staff: 85
- Gender: Coed
- Age: Preschool to 12th grade
- Enrollment: 532
- Colors: Purple and Gold
- Slogan: Forming Mind, Body, & Soul
- Song: Notre Dame Victory March
- Athletics conference: Minnesota Section 8A
- Sports: 28 girls and boys athletic options
- Mascot: Eugene the Eagle
- Team name: Eagles, Thunder (PCW Polk County West - Sacred Heart/Fisher-Climax football co-op)
- Accreditation: MNSAA
- Communities served: Greater Grand Forks
- Website: http://www.sacredheartegf.net/school

Sacred Heart School is a private, Catholic school in East Grand Forks, Minnesota. It is located in the Diocese of Crookston. The school caters to the Greater Grand Forks community in northwest Minnesota and northeast North Dakota.

Sacred Heart School was established in 1912 and provides day care, pre-school, elementary and high school. 48% of students receive tuition assistance, and 80% of students identify as Catholic.

Sacred Heart School is located at 200 3rd Street NW, East Grand Forks, MN 56721.

== History ==
=== 1895 – 1900 ===
The first Catholic school in East Grand Forks began in 1895 when Father Hendrick, the first pastor of Sacred Heart, requested that the Sisters of St. Benedict, Duluth, MN start a mission at East Grand Forks. Mother Scholastica purchased a three-story wooden building at the present southern intersection of Business Highway 2 East and 220 North to be used as a school, hospital, and convent.

The school opened on the first floor in the fall of 1895 staffed by Sisters James, Gertrude and Josephine as teachers. The name of the school is unclear. Accounts list either Sacred Heart School or St. Joseph's School (same name as the hospital on the top two floors). The school appears to have had a full capacity.

The newly built Sacred Heart Church was destroyed by fire on December 1, 1895, and Rev. Hendrick immediately began to raise funds to rebuild the church. Sister Josephine recounted the following story: “Mother Scholastica came to the mission at East Grand Forks [and] Father Hendrick paid a courtesy visit to the convent. The conversation turned upon the burning of his church and the campaign he was conducting to raise building funds.

“When one of the sisters casually proposed a St. Patrick’s Day program [by the children] as a moneymaking project for the church, everyone, including Reverend Mother, agreed... The sale of tickets was so large that no hall in East Grand Forks could accommodate the crowd which was expected. Father Hendrick rented the Opera House in Grand Forks...

"Just before the time to raise the curtain, Father Hendrick, very pale, came upon the platform, a letter in his hand and announced to the audience that the entertainment had to be postponed, that it would be presented in East Grand Forks free-of-charge [and] that the admission fee would be refunded at the door when the audience was going out. Only one person wanted a refund. The free entertainment took place in the basement of the new church, which was completed the second week of June.”

According to one account, Father Hendrick had failed to notify the Grand Forks Catholic pastor who protested to his Bishop (Grand Forks being in another diocese than East Grand Forks). In turn, the Bishop of Duluth was contacted and Father Hendrick was prohibited from following through with the music program in Grand Forks.

The school moved to the basement of the rebuilt church in March 1898 or 1899. Sister Seraphica Karp's diary revealed what the school was like:

“The school is extremely poor for a 19th century school. There are two large rooms in the basement of the church with the furnace room between. The rafters of the church floor from the ceiling and the walls are bare brick walls, whitewashed. The windows are low, the whole a dirty, damp and misty place. It was the most dreary-looking schoolroom I had ever seen. But we had it all looking clean and nice within a day, as it could be made without any expense. Wednesday, September 2 dawned bright and clear. We ha[d] mass at the church at 8 a.m. I went to school and some of the children were there already, looking as bright and happy as could be! The first day I had about 20 children from five to 10-years-old.”

This first school was closed around 1900, there is conflicting information regarding the last year of school. The Sisters of Duluth decided to withdraw their mission from East Grand Forks. Although support was strong from the pastors and parish to build a Catholic school, it would take 12 years before it would happen.

=== 1918-1952 ===
At that time, a high school education was difficult for many students because it was deemed not as necessary. That is why many students left school after eighth grade and worked on the home farm full-time.

Members of the first eighth grade graduating class of 1913 were Marie Bowes, Ralph Carney, Rosella Carney, Amelia Crystal, Francis Driscoll, Alveretta Enright, Edward Enright, Bernard Kelly, Edward Ketter, Josephine Kingman, Marie LaBarge, Adorine McCoy, Franham Murphy, Genevieve Murphy, Cecelia O’Leary, Irene Powers, Frank Sullivan, Willard Sullivan and Frank Wurzbacher. The class colors were old-rose and silver gray, and motto was “Ever Upward and Onward”.

It is noted in the 1937 Reunion Book that “having sisters as teachers was a novelty. Having recess was another–[students] departed in all directions, and returned as it occurred to them to do so. Recess was discontinued, and the new pupils [were] instructed in 1913 [on the] rules of etiquette, with such good effect that 19 still living are among Uncle Sam’s most law-abiding citizens.”

In 1919, the direction and staffing of the schools was taken over by the Sisters of St. Benedict of Crookston, a new mother house formed from the Benedictines of Duluth. That year, Sacred Heart organized its first freshman class. A new grade was added each year until 1923, when the first senior class of six students graduated from the high school. Those first graduates of the high school division were Lawrence Butler, Michael Harrick, Alice McCoy, Leona O’Neil, Roland Roberts and Louis Sullivan. Their class flower was the American beauty rose, colors were blue and burnt orange, and the motto was “Build for Character, Not for Fame.”

Leona O’Neil was valedictorian of the class. Other members of the class who did not finish high school due to work obligations, religious commitments and other reasons were Frederick Borchers, Madonna Carney, Jerome Enright, Veronica Kane, Lillian Keller, Laura Kelly, Josephine Lickteig, Gertrude Powers, Albert Roberts, Aileen Sullivan, Vincent Sullivan and Elizabeth DeGagne.

Stories and memories of the old Sacred Heart Academy have a very special place in the hearts and minds of its graduates. Once such story about a senior of the class of 1924 claims that he “doubted the adequacy of his Sacred Heart School training by the time he came to graduate, for they say that when a senior, he one day dangled the flapping sole of his shoe out the office window as the ranks were coming in, calling down to the children to observe the condition of his ‘sole’ after 12 years spent in Sacred Heart School.” The story does not tell why he was in the office. The student's name was Frank Ketter, who was later ordained a priest in 1933.

=== 1952-1985 ===
By 1952, 409 students had graduated, and a full high school course was maintained. By that year, however, space had become short as expanding enrollment made demands on classroom facilities. The crowded condition was relieved in 1952 with the erection of a high school building next to the 1912 building. The undertaking was under the guidance of Father A.I. Merth, who became pastor of Sacred Heart Parish in 1947 following the death of Msgr. Klinkhammer. It had been the dying wish of Msgr. Klinkhammer that enlarged and modern facilities for the schools be built, along with a new church building.

A Finance committee had been formed as early as 1948 to formulate plans for the project. Members of the committee were John P. Bushee, chairman; Leo J. Herrick, Charles E. King, J. James Powers, and Albert Boushey. Also at this time a building fund drive was started, and by the end of 1949, the fund had grown to approximately $200,000.

The committee entered into a contract with Ursa Louis Freed, an architect from Aberdeen, S.D. Through the summer of 1949, the Planning Committee was busy going over drawings submitted by the architect, and a booklet containing the drawings of the entire project was prepared. Members of the Planning Committee were Charles Hertweck, Earl Enright, George Bushee Sr., Edward Ketter, Leonard Driscoll, Frank Barnard, John Cameron Sim, John Bushee, James Kelleher, Frank Zejdlik and John Greenwood.

Money continued to be a problem, and in late 1949 and early 1950, the Building Fund Drive was given a thorough reorganization, but the parishioners and community responded and, in April 1950, the overall plans were sent out to contractors. On May 5, major bids of over $600,000 were awarded. The efforts of many groups went into the funding drive, including the students who raised money using certain walls of the project as their goal.

Two damaging floods and the lack of building materials caused by the Korean War delayed the project until the fall of 1950. The auditorium was built on the site of the old church and was used for the graduation exercises for the class of 1951. On January 7, 1952, grades 7 through 12 moved into the new high school building. The new school and church were officially dedicated on Monday, March 31, 1952, by Bishop Francis J. Schenk.

Enrollment in the high school increased following the transition to the new facility, particularly in the 1950s and early 1960s. The high school population for grades 9 through 12 grew from 148 in 1956 to 270 in 1966. This enrollment began to decrease somewhat in 1972, as there were 250 students in high school that year.

A new grade school building was built in 1958 on Fourth Street. The seventh and eighth grades were moved to the new building from the high school. The two rooms they occupied in the high school were used by parish organizations and later as classrooms in 1963 and 1964.

The physical expansion permitted by the new building prompted the faculty to make applications for accreditation with the University of Minnesota. Accreditation was first granted in 1954 and has been continually renewed. The grade school was accredited in 1986, one of the early Catholic elementary schools in Minnesota to do so. In recent years, the new accrediting association is the Minnesota Nonpublic School Accreditation Association in St. Paul. The first school board was elected in 1963. The members were Robert Zavoral, Robert Campbell, John Gaddie, Raymond Stocker, John Cook and Michael O’Leary.

In the early years of the school's history, the course of studies for high school students included four years of religion, four years of English, three years of social studies, two to four years of mathematics, three or four years of science and two years of Latin. In the 1930s, bookkeeping and typing were introduced. In 1952, shorthand and secretarial training were added. The new building also made the introduction of home economics and industrial arts possible.

In 1985, the Interim Program was developed at Sacred Heart School for grades 7 through 12. At that time, the program created a two-week interim between trimesters during the school year. This program was originally directed by Bonnie Andrys. Students were allowed to take two elective classes, one morning and one afternoon, from such offerings as women's studies, design and engineering, computer literacy, drama, ballroom dance, cabinetry, welding, chemistry in agricultural research, etc. This cooperative program with community leaders and volunteers enabled Sacred Heart to have an innovative curriculum greatly expanding the learning possibilities for students.

== Sports ==
Sacred Heart has offered a number of sports throughout its history largely through the support of a dedicated Athletic Association, formerly the Men's Club. This Association, for example, provided the equipment for the 1952 gymnasium at the cost of $6,000. Although their budget has grown greatly over the years, they continue to enthusiastically support the sports program entirely. Today, the Athletic Association must raise over $100,000 annually. This group of dedicated parents and friends of Sacred Heart raise the money with game passes, concession stand sales, vending, gym signs, sponsors, the annual dinner and social, and Fish Fries. The Athletic Club Fish Fries have become an area tradition that today serves 800 to 900 every Friday during the Lenten season. The work crews are made up the various sports teams and their parents each working a different Friday.

The Athletic Association also sponsors a sports Hall of Fame recognizing various individuals and teams. The honorees are recognized during homecoming week of the football season. These honorees have been chosen based upon their high school or college accomplishments and/or their efforts to help the school's athletic programs.

== School development program ==
Recognizing the need for a systematic, long-range program of planning to insure the development and future of Sacred Heart Schools, Father Jerry Rogers started the school’s Development Program in 1982. It is involved in the raising of funds, endowment oversight, scholarship growth, recruitment and public relations. The present director is Michelle Kraft. Past directors include Rob Horken, Eleanor Ogaard, and Amy Kliniske. The Development Office is responsible for various fundraising activities such as the Rake-a-thon; Calendar Raffle; Scrip; Annual Drives with the parish, business, and alumni; and the Spring Fling. The Spring Fling has grown in size the past few years doubling to recent totals of $100,000. A new project has been the school’s golf scramble in early September raising $20,000 with over one hundred participants. Development is more than fundraising as its purpose is to grow an understanding of what Catholic education is and support for within the community. The high school has recently had an increase in foreign exchange students and a large number of Korean students. The high school also added in recent years baseball and softball for grades seven through twelve. Other improvements to the school include a complete automation of the library and updating the computer labs as well as staff computers. The elementary school has incorporated a new technology program. In 2009, the school started a new parents association called “Parents Getting Involved” (PGI). The purpose of PGI is to assist the Development program with its various activities as well as building support for the teachers and staff. The school's preschool program has grown greatly first starting at a four-year-old program (Little Saints) starting in 1993 then adding a three-year-old program (Little Angels) later. Its enrollment has doubled and then doubled again with current waiting lists. The program is licensed by the State of Minnesota. Daycare was added to the school program in 1999 with the new building. This program is also licensed by the State and has been in demand with a long waiting list.

== Lumen Christi ==
Lumen Christi was developed to recognize alumni, staff, and friends who have had distinguished careers and/or have served Sacred Heart in a significant way. Every other year, the honorees receive recognition at an October banquet.

The basic purpose of Sacred Heart Schools since 1921, as with any other Catholic school, is the promotion of the Catholic faith to the youth while creating community and learning of the highest quality. While the teaching staff has changed from primarily the teaching sisters to lay teachers and the buildings have changed, the philosophy has not. Current teachers at Sacred Heart include many former graduates of Sacred Heart and other Catholic high schools who continue the tradition of high quality Catholic education in East Grand Forks.

== Principals ==
Principals of first Catholic School

- Gertrude, 1899
- M. Catherine, 1899–1900

Sacred Heart Principals include:

- M. Hyacinthe, 1912–1913
- Aquina 1913–1914
- Josepha, 1914–1919
- Thecla, 1919–1923
- Milburga, 1923–1925
- Humilitas, 1925–1930
- Cyprian, 1930–1934
- Adrian, 1934–1936
- Emmanual, 1936–1937
- Rose, 1937–1939
- Adrian, 1939–1946
- Mary John Flynn, 1946–1947
- Mary Joseph, 1947–1952

High School:

- Marcella, 1952–1957
- Bernarda, 1957–1971
- Joan LaCoursiere, 1971–1978
- Basil LeDuc, 1978–1986
- Phillip E. Meyer, 1986–2013
- Carl Adolphson, 2013–2014
- Dave Andrys, 2014-2016 K-12
- Jodi Vanderheiden, 2016–2017 K-12
- Blake Karas, 2017–2022 K-12
- Joanne Wilson, 2017–Present (Assistant Principal and Academic Dean)
- Nevin Lubarski, 2022–Present K-12
