= KGFK (AM) =

Classic rock radio station in East Grand Forks, Minnesota–Grand Forks, North Dakota

Coordinates: 47°52′40.9″N 97°00′25.3″W

- East Grand Forks, Minnesota; United States
- Broadcast area: Grand Forks, North Dakota
- Frequency: 1590 kHz
- Branding: Rock 95

Programming
- Format: Classic rock
- Affiliations: United Stations Radio Networks

Ownership
- Owner: Leighton Broadcasting
- Sister stations: KNOX, KYCK, KZGF, KZLT-FM

History
- First air date: 1959 (as KRAD)
- Former call signs: KRAD (1959–1981); KRRK (1981–1986); KCNN (1986–2011)
- Call sign meaning: Grand Forks (KGFK is also the ICAO code for the Grand Forks Int'l Airport)

Technical information
- Licensing authority: FCC
- Facility ID: 33000
- Class: B
- Power: 5,000 watts day 1,000 watts night
- Translators: 95.7 K239BG (Grand Forks, North Dakota); 97.5 K248DH (East Grand Forks)

Links
- Public license information: Public file; LMS
- Webcast: Listen Live
- Website: KGFK Website

KGFK (1590 kHz, "Rock 95") is an AM radio station broadcasting a classic rock format. Licensed to East Grand Forks, Minnesota, it serves the Grand Forks, North Dakota metropolitan area. The station also broadcasts on translators K239BG (95.7 FM, "Rock 95") in Grand Forks and K248DH (97.5 FM, "Rock 95") in East Grand Forks. It first began broadcasting in 1959 under the call sign KRAD and used the call sign KCNN for several years. The station is currently owned by Leighton Broadcasting, and competes with iHeartMedia's active rock 107.5 KJKJ "KJ108" and classic hits KQHT "96.1 The Fox".

== History ==
=== KCNN days ===
KGFK/1590 previously aired a news/talk format as KCNN, and starting focusing on nationally syndicated talk shows after being bought by Leighton Broadcasting in 2003 to differentiate with co-owned KNOX.

=== Rooster and Fox Sports ===
On September 27, 2007, KCNN continued KNOX-FM/94.7's classic country as "The Rooster", as KNOX-FM/94.7 flipped to classic rock. Because of popularity, Rush Limbaugh was still syndicated on weekdays at normal time.

On August 14, 2009, KCNN flipped to a sports format featuring programming from Fox Sports Radio, and competed with FAN Network affiliate KKXL-AM/1440.

=== Rock to "The Forks" ===
On November 5, 2010, KCNN changed their format to mainstream rock, branded as "Rock 107.9" (frequency in branding is for FM translator K300BG 107.9 FM Grand Forks, ND), primarily competing with active rock formatted KJKJ "KJ108" just down the dial at 107.5 FM. K300BG signed on the air just days before the format flip. Before K300BG's sign on, Fargo-based classic rock station KPFX "107.9 The Fox" could sometimes be heard in Grand Forks. On February 21, 2011, KCNN changed their call letters to KGFK.

On October 11, 2011, translator K239BG 95.7 FM signed on to resolve 107.9's signal issues. 95.7 originally began as an unbuilt translator in Grafton that was purchased by Leighton Broadcasting and moved to Grand Forks (107.9 was also an unbuilt translator purchased by Leighton). 95.7's transmitter is located near the junction of U.S. Highway 81 (North Washington Street) and U.S. Highway 2 (Gateway Drive) near downtown Grand Forks. 107.9's transmitter is located off 32nd Ave South west of the I-29 interchange. On October 27, 2011, KGFK changed its branding to "Rock 95.7" as the signal is much stronger than 107.9

After 95.7 signed on, the station began simulcasting "Zac Daniel in the Morning" from sister station KZGF "Z94.7" during weekday morning hours.

On January 5, 2011, KGFK began stunting with replays of "Zac Daniel in the Morning". On January 9, 2011, the station flipped to an adult hits format playing pop and rock hits from the 1960s, 1970s, 1980s, 1990s, 2000s to the present. On January 11, 2012, 107.9 FM broke up with 95.7 FM and 1590 AM as it switched to become a translator of KNOX-AM/1310.

On March 12, 2018, KGFK changed their format to classic rock, still branded as "The Forks".

On September 17, 2018, KGFK rebranded as "Rock 95".

In May 2021, second FM translator K248DH 97.5 FM in East Grand Forks–Grand Forks signed on for better rural coverage from the KZLT/KZGF transmitter tower, including coverage of Crookston, while K239BG 95.7 FM continues to cover the immediate Grand Forks–East Grand Forks area.

KGFK also broadcasts Minnesota Twins baseball and local high school sports. KGFK successfully competes with iHeartMedia's heritage active rock KJKJ/107.5 "KJ108" and classic hits KQHT "96.1 The Fox" for the lucrative upper demographics in Grand Forks and continues to do so.

== Translators ==
KGFK broadcasts on the following FM translators:

Call sign	Frequency	City of license	FID	ERP (W)	Class	FCC info
K239BG	95.7 FM	Grand Forks, North Dakota	147641	250	D	LMS
K248DH	97.5 FM	East Grand Forks, Minnesota	202225	250	D	LMS
