= KYCK =

Radio station in Crookston, Minnesota–Grand Forks, North Dakota

Coordinates: 47.822°N 96.821°W

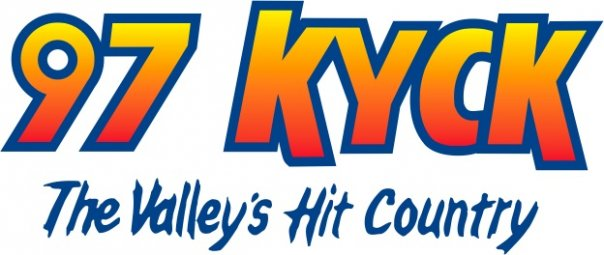
- Crookston, Minnesota; United States
- Broadcast area: Greater Grand Forks
- Frequency: 97.1 MHz
- Branding: 97 KYCK

Programming
- Format: Country music
- Affiliations: Compass Media Networks; Westwood One

Ownership
- Owner: Leighton Broadcasting
- Sister stations: KGFK, KNOX, KZGF, KZLT-FM

History
- First air date: 1979
- Former call signs: KDWZ (1979–1981)
- Call sign meaning: pronounced as "kick"

Technical information
- Licensing authority: FCC
- Facility ID: 62059
- Class: C1
- ERP: 100,000 watts
- HAAT: 113.4 meters

Links
- Public license information: Public file; LMS
- Webcast: Listen Live
- Website: 97kyck.com

KYCK (97.1 FM, "97 KYCK") is a radio station broadcasting a country format serving Grand Forks, North Dakota that's licensed to Crookston, Minnesota. It first began broadcasting in 1979 under the call sign KDWZ. The station is currently owned by Leighton Broadcasting. The station's main competitor is iHeartMedia's KSNR "100.3 Cat Country".

== History ==
KYCK signed on in 1979 as KDWZ with a Top 40 (CHR) format. In 1981, as KKXL-FM signed on with a Top 40 format, KDWZ became KYCK (pronounced as "kick") with a country music format.
