= KBRF =

- Fergus Falls, Minnesota; United States
- Broadcast area: Fergus Falls-Detroit Lakes
- Frequency: 1250 kHz
- Branding: AM 1250 News Talk

Programming
- Format: News/talk
- Affiliations: NBC News Radio; Fox Sports Radio; Compass Media Networks; Premiere Networks; Townhall News; Westwood One

Ownership
- Owner: Leighton Broadcasting; (Leighton Radio Holdings, Inc.)
- Sister stations: KJJK, KJJK-FM, KPRW, KZCR

History
- First air date: October 20, 1926
- Former call signs: KGDE (1926–1959); KOTE (1959–1967)

Technical information
- Licensing authority: FCC
- Facility ID: 21400
- Class: B
- Power: 5,000 watts day 2,200 watts night
- Transmitter coordinates: 46°16′24.2″N 96°2′44.7″W

Links
- Public license information: Public file; LMS
- Webcast: Listen Live
- Website: KBRF website

KBRF (1250 AM, "Good Neighbor Radio") is a radio station licensed to Fergus Falls, Minnesota, United States and serving the Fergus Falls-Detroit Lakes area. It broadcasts a news/talk format featuring programming from NBC News Radio, Fox Sports Radio, Compass Media Networks, Premiere Networks, Townhall News, and Westwood One.

The station is currently owned by Leighton Broadcasting, through licensee Leighton Radio Holdings, Inc. Studios and offices are west of downtown Fergus Falls at 728 Western Avenue North, near I94. The transmitter site is east of town, on Highway 210.

== History ==
KBRF's first license was granted on October 20, 1926 as KGDE, licensed to the Jaren Drug Company in Barrett, Minnesota. The original call letters were randomly assigned from an alphabetic list of available call signs. The call letters were changed to KOTE in 1959, and became KBRF in 1967.

=== Expanded Band assignment ===
On March 17, 1997, the Federal Communications Commission announced that KBRF was authorized to move from its original frequency of 1250 kHz to the expanded band frequency of 1680 kHz, one of 88 stations given expanded band assignments. However, the station never procured the Construction Permit needed to implement the authorization, so the expanded band station was never built.

=== Later history ===
Leighton Broadcasting acquired KBRF in 2015, as part of the Lakes Radio purchase, expanding their market presence.
