= East Grand Forks Senior High School =

Coordinates: 47.9397222°N 97.0230556°W

Location
- 1420 4th Avenue Northwest; East Grand Forks, Minnesota 56721; United States

Information
- Type: Public High school
- School district: East Grand Forks Public Schools ISD 595
- Superintendent: Kevin Grover
- Principal: Brian Loer
- Teaching staff: 35.65 (FTE)
- Grades: 9–12
- Enrollment: 588 (2023–2024)
- Student to teacher ratio: 16.49
- Language: English
- Colors: Green, White, and Red
- Song: Hail to the Varsity
- Athletics conference: Minnesota State High School League Section 8A
- Mascot: Green Wave
- Communities served: East Grand Forks, MN
- Feeder schools: East Grand Forks Central Middle School
- Website: Official Site

East Grand Forks Senior High School is a public high school in East Grand Forks, Minnesota, United States.

== History ==
A fire in February 1919 completely destroyed the school. The school re-opened in September 2017 with additional facilities such as a conference room and STEM labs.

== State Championships ==
=== Football ===
- 2004 (Class AAA)

=== Boys Hockey ===
- 2014 (Class A)
- 2015 (Class A)
- 2025 (Class A)

== Notable alumni ==
- Dave Thompson, radio host and member of the Minnesota Senate, class of 1980.
- Tucker Poolman, hockey player
- Kurt Knoff, former NFL football safety
