= KDLM =

Coordinates: 46°50′14″N 95°50′17″W

- Detroit Lakes, Minnesota; United States
- Broadcast area: Detroit Lakes, Minnesota
- Frequency: 1340 kHz
- Branding: KDLM 1340 AM

Programming
- Format: News/talk/classic hits
- Affiliations: ABC News Radio; Compass Media Networks; Premiere Networks

Ownership
- Owner: Leighton Broadcasting
- Sister stations: KRCQ-FM, KBOT

History
- First air date: October 9, 1951
- Call sign meaning: Detroit Lakes, Minnesota

Technical information
- Licensing authority: FCC
- Facility ID: 37000
- Class: C
- Power: 1,000 watts
- Translators: 93.1 K226CA (Detroit Lakes); 96.9 K245CU (Detroit Lakes)

Links
- Public license information: Public file; LMS
- Website: 1340kdlm.com

KDLM (1340 AM) is a radio station airing a News/Talk/classic hits format. The station serves Detroit Lakes, Minnesota and is owned by Leighton Broadcasting.

== K226CA ==
On June 12, 2014 the FCC granted the transfer of a construction permit for an FM translator from Shine the Light, inc. to Leighton. The translator is currently online and broadcasting at a frequency of 93.1 MHz. According to radio-locator maps, the entire listening area of K226CA is slightly smaller than the distant reception area of KDLM's main signal.

== On Air Staff ==
- Mornings with Joel Koetke 6-8:30
- Hodge Podge 8:30-9:30
- SportsWrap 9:30-10:00
- Off The Record With Zeke 10:00-2:00
- Aftanoon Jam with Dave Lee 2:00-6:00
- KDLM broadcasts a variety of local and state sports including the Detroit Lakes Lakers HS teams, the Minnesota Vikings, Minnesota Twins, Minnesota Wild, Minnesota Lynx, Minnesota Timberwolves and Minnesota Golden Gopher Football, Basketball and Hockey. KDLM also broadcasts Sunday Night and Monday Night football from Westwood One.
- Coast To Coast AM (overnight talk show)
- America's First News with Gordon Deal.
