= KBOT =

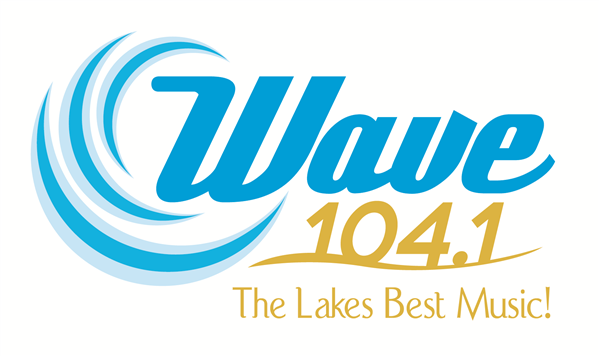
- Pelican Rapids, Minnesota; United States
- Broadcast area: Detroit Lakes, Minnesota
- Frequency: 104.1 MHz
- Branding: Wave 104-1

Programming
- Format: Adult contemporary
- Affiliations: Premiere Networks; Minnesota Vikings

Ownership
- Owner: Leighton Broadcasting
- Sister stations: KRCQ-FM, KDLM

Technical information
- Licensing authority: FCC
- Facility ID: 51059
- Class: C2
- ERP: 50,000 watts
- HAAT: 139 meters
- Transmitter coordinates: 46.722°N 95.844°W

Links
- Public license information: Public file; LMS
- Webcast: Listen Live
- Website: catchthewave1041.com

KBOT (104.1 FM, "Wave 104.1") is a radio station licensed to Pelican Rapids, Minnesota that serves Detroit Lakes, Minnesota. The station is owned by Leighton Broadcasting. The station has an adult contemporary format, and is advertised along with sisters stations AM 1340 KDLM, and Real Country 102.3 KRCQ on a billboard at the KDLM studio outside Detroit Lakes.

== History ==
On September 22, 2010, KBOT dropped its previous country format as "Wild 104.1" and began stunting as "All Request 104.1". On September 27, 2010, KBOT officially announced the station's new name, as "Wave 104.1".

== Internet Radio ==
Wave 104.1 offers a link on their website to stream the live broadcast via popup.
