= KPRW =

Radio station in Perham–Fergus Falls, Minnesota

Coordinates: 46.554°N 95.457°W

- Perham, Minnesota; United States
- Broadcast area: Fergus Falls, Minnesota
- Frequency: 99.5 MHz
- Branding: The Lakes 99.5

Programming
- Format: Adult contemporary
- Affiliations: Premiere Networks

Ownership
- Owner: Leighton Broadcasting; (Leighton Radio Holdings, Inc.)
- Sister stations: KBRF, KJJK, KJJK-FM, KZCR

History
- First air date: 1985
- Call sign meaning: KPRW Perham

Technical information
- Licensing authority: FCC
- Class: A
- ERP: 6,000 watts
- HAAT: 99 meters (325 ft)

Links
- Public license information: Public file; LMS
- Webcast: Listen Live
- Website: thelakes995.com

KPRW (99.5 FM, "The Lakes 99.5") is a radio station broadcasting an adult contemporary format serving Perham, Minnesota. The station is currently owned by Leighton Broadcasting, through licensee Leighton Radio Holdings, Inc.

The studios and offices are at 235 West Main Street, Perham, Mn. The transmitter site is east of Perham, Minnesota, on Highway 10. The station features local news, sports, and weather, with the weekday morning show from 6 AM to 10 AM called "How We Wake Up" with David Howey.

KPRW is licensed as a Class A FM facility. It operates with an Effective Radiated Power (ERP) of 6,000 watts and an antenna Height Above Average Terrain (HAAT) of 99 meters (325 feet).

== History ==
KPRW first signed on the air in 1985. The station is currently owned by Leighton Broadcasting and operates from studios and offices located in Perham, Minnesota, at 235 West Main Street.
