= KZCR =

Coordinates: 46.468°N 96.199°W

- Fergus Falls, Minnesota; United States
- Broadcast area: Fergus Falls-Detroit Lakes
- Frequency: 103.3 MHz
- Branding: Real Rock Z103

Programming
- Format: Mainstream rock/AAA

Ownership
- Owner: Leighton Broadcasting; (Leighton Radio Holdings, Inc.)
- Sister stations: KBRF, KJJK, KJJK-FM, KPRW

History
- First air date: January 19, 1968 (as KBRF-FM)
- Former call signs: KBRF-FM (1968–1993)

Technical information
- Licensing authority: FCC
- Facility ID: 21399
- Class: C1
- ERP: 100,000 watts
- HAAT: 198 meters

Links
- Public license information: Public file; LMS
- Webcast: Listen Live
- Website: z103rocks.com

KZCR (103.3 FM, "Z103.3") is a radio station broadcasting a mainstream rock/adult album alternative format hybrid, reminiscent of the defunct album oriented rock format, serving Fergus Falls, Minnesota. The station is currently owned by Leighton Broadcasting, through licensee Leighton Radio Holdings, Inc. The station's signal also reaches the Fargo-Moorhead metropolitan area.

== History ==
The station first signed on the air on January 19, 1968, using the call sign KBRF-FM. The call sign was changed to KZCR in 1993. In 2015, Leighton Broadcasting acquired KZCR and nine other stations in the Fergus Falls and Winona, Minnesota, markets through an acquisition from Jerry Papenfus.

The station is also affiliated with the Z103 Bar & Grill. In the summer of 2011, KZCR changed its slogan from "Z103.3, The Heart of Rock" to "Z103, Minnesota's Custom Rock". The station plays a wide span of music ranging from the 1970s through today, including deep album cuts and new music. The genres include classic rock, deep album cuts, cover songs, new wave, punk rock, glam metal, modern rock/alternative and adult album alternative.

The studios and offices are west of downtown Fergus Falls, at 728 Western Avenue North, near I-94. The transmitter is between Fergus Falls and Detroit Lakes near Rothsay, so its signal reaches both Fergus Falls and Detroit Lakes and a rimshot signal to the Fargo-Moorhead metropolitan area.

It was announced on April 7, 2015 that KZCR and nine other Result Radio stations had been sold to St. Cloud-based Leighton Broadcasting, with the Leighton group slated to take over the stations on August 1, 2015.
