= KRCQ =

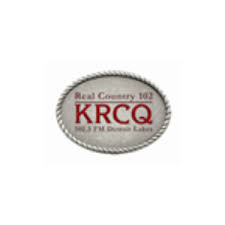
- Detroit Lakes, Minnesota; United States
- Frequency: 102.3 MHz
- Branding: Real Country 102

Programming
- Format: Classic country
- Affiliations: ABC News Radio

Ownership
- Owner: Leighton Broadcasting
- Sister stations: KDLM, KBOT

Technical information
- Licensing authority: FCC
- Facility ID: 56800
- Class: C2
- ERP: 50,000 watts
- HAAT: 126.0 meters
- Transmitter coordinates: 46°48′24.00″N 95°46′23.00″W

Links
- Public license information: Public file; LMS
- Webcast: Listen Live
- Website: KRCQ Online

KRCQ (102.3 FM, "Real Country 102") is a radio station broadcasting a classic country music format. The station is licensed to serve Detroit Lakes, Minnesota, United States. The station is currently owned by Leighton Broadcasting.

== Ownership History ==
In October 2009, Detroit Lakes Broadcasting filed an application with the FCC to transfer the broadcast license to Lake Lida Broadcasting, LLC. This application was approved on January 8, 2010, and the transfer of the sale went through. In June 2010, the station was bought from Lake Lida Broadcasting, and joined the Leighton Broadcasting group.

== Programming ==
6 am – 9 am Real Early with Dave Lee

9 am-10 am All Request 9 o' Clock Work Block w/ Dave Lee

10 am-12 pm Smokey Rivers

12 pm-1 pm David Kinderman

1 pm-3 pm Mark Phillips

3 pm-6 pm David Kinderman

6 pm-12 am Trapper John
