= KMGK =

Radio station in Glenwood, Minnesota

Coordinates: 45.615°N 95.391°W

- Glenwood, Minnesota; United States
- Broadcast area: Alexandria - Sauk Centre
- Frequency: 107.1 MHz
- Branding: Wild Country 107

Programming
- Format: Country
- Affiliations: Minnesota Timberwolves; Minnesota Twins; Minnesota Wild; North Dakota State Bison football

Ownership
- Owner: Branstock Communications

History
- First air date: 1982; 44 years ago
- Former call signs: KZZA (1982–1990)
- Call sign meaning: KMGK Magic (previous format)

Technical information
- Licensing authority: FCC
- Class: A
- ERP: 3,300 watts
- HAAT: 91 meters (299 ft)

Links
- Public license information: Public file; LMS
- Webcast: Listen live
- Website: Wild Country 107 Online

KMGK (107.1 FM) is a commercial radio station licensed to Glenwood, Minnesota. It airs a country music radio format. Known as "Wild Country 107", the station plays country music. The signal covers Alexandria and Sauk Centre, where the station targets its programming.

Leighton Enterprises has announced an intent to buy the station from current owner Branstock Communications, with a call letter change to KXGK as of December 1, 2026. The radio studios are on First Street SE in Glenwood.

KMGK is a Class A station, with an effective radiated power of 3,300 watts. The transmitter is off Sunrise Drive near Minnesota State Highway 104.

== History ==
=== Smooth Magic 107 (JRN) ===
From March 2005, until September 30, 2008, KMGK aired a satellite feed (from the Jones Radio Networks) called The Smooth Jazz Station. The format was discontinued as part of the integration into the Dial Global brand.

=== Magic 107 (JRN) ===
Up until March 2005, Magic 107 aired an Adult Contemporary format from the satellite feed from Jones Radio Network.

=== Wild Country 107 ===
On November 1, 2026, KMGK changed their format from soft AC/oldies to country, branded as "Wild Country 107", with new KXGK call letters pending.

== Sports coverage ==
KMGK provides coverage of some high school sporting events for Minnewaska Area High School, Osakis High School, Alexandria High School and Belgrade-Brooten-Elrosa High School. KMGK hosts a weekly talk show called Coaches Round-up, featuring interviews of area high school coaches. It also is a part of the Minnesota Twins Radio Network.

Smooth Magic 107 is a Gopher Radio Network affiliate and carries University of Minnesota Football and Men's Basketball as well as occasional Gopher Men's Hockey and Women's Basketball. KMGK also airs some North Dakota State University NDSU Bison Football games.

== Previous logo ==
File:KMGK.jpg
