= KZLT-FM =

Radio station in East Grand Forks, Minnesota–Grand Forks, North Dakota

Coordinates: 47.814°N 96.930°W

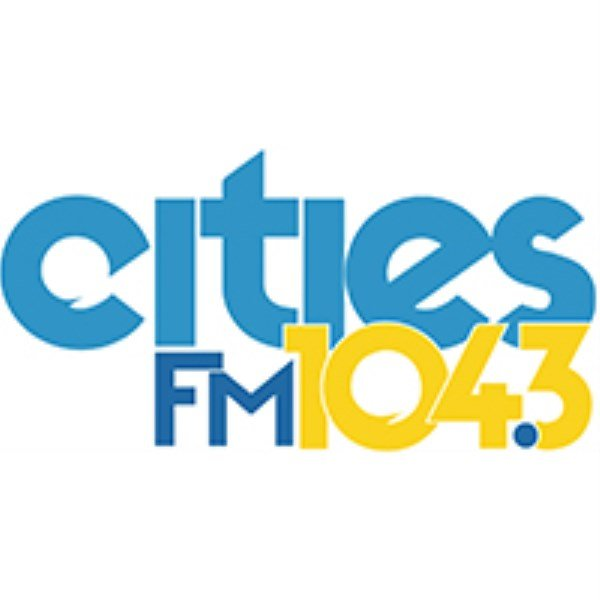

East Grand Forks, Minnesota; United States
- Broadcast area: Grand Forks, North Dakota
- Frequency: 104.3 MHz
- Branding: 104.3 Cities FM

Programming
- Format: Adult contemporary

Ownership
- Owner: Leighton Broadcasting
- Sister stations: KGFK, KNOX, KYCK, KZGF

History
- First air date: December 3, 1979 (as KRAD-FM at 103.9)
- Former call signs: KRAD-FM (1979–1981); KRRK (1981–1985)
- Former frequencies: 103.9 MHz (1979–1981)
- Call sign meaning: EZ (easy) LiTe (describes the AC music format)

Technical information
- Licensing authority: FCC
- Facility ID: 35509
- Class: C1
- ERP: 100,000 watts
- HAAT: 139.5 meters

Links
- Public license information: Public file; LMS
- Webcast: Listen Live
- Website: 1043citiesfm.com

KZLT-FM (104.3 MHz, "Cities FM") is a radio station broadcasting an adult contemporary format. Licensed to East Grand Forks, Minnesota, it serves the Grand Forks, North Dakota metropolitan area. It first began broadcasting in 1979 under the call sign KRAD-FM. The station is currently owned by Leighton Broadcasting.

== History ==
The station signed on December 3, 1979 as a Class A on 103.9 as KRAD-FM, simulcasting KRAD AM 1590 (now KGFK), and was owned by Dave Norman.

The station flipped to Country Music in the 1980s as KRRK "Double R 104", and KZLT in the spring of 1985 on the 104.3 frequency. Station owner Dave Norman changed the format to light Adult contemporary (AC) as "K-Lite" under the KZLT call sign, increased power to 100,000 watts from a transmitter west of Fisher, Minnesota. KZLT and KCNN were moved from the transmitter/studio complex in East Grand Forks to the Cass Gilbert designed Great Northern Railway Depot in downtown Grand Forks.

Formats of KZLT
Name (call signs)	Format
KRAD-FM 103.9	News/Talk (1979–1981) (simulcast of KRAD AM 1590)
Double R 104 (KRRK)	Country (1981–1985)
K-Lite 104 (KZLT-FM)	Adult contemporary (1985–1999)
Cities 104.3	Hot adult contemporary (1999–2001)
Z104	Classic rock (2001–2003)
Breeze 104.3	Adult Contemporary (2003–2005)
More Music 104.3	Hot Adult Contemporary (2005–2006); CHR/Top 40 (2006–2007)
Lite Rock 104.3	Adult Contemporary (2007–2012)
104.3 KZLT	Adult Contemporary (2012–2013)
Lite Rock 104.3	Adult Contemporary (2013–2014)
104.3 Cities FM	Adult Contemporary (2014–present)

In late 1999, the station repositioned itself with a Hot AC format as "Cities 104.3". Lightning struck KZLT's transmitter on May 31, 2001, keeping the station off-air for a week. Cities 104.3 began broadcasting again at low-power until a new transmitter was completed in October 2001, when an 80's based classic rock format as "Z104" was introduced. Norman sold KZLT and KCNN to Leighton Broadcasting in 2003, and later KZLT changed back to an adult contemporary format as "Breeze 104.3".

In December 2005, KZLT tweaked to a hot adult contemporary, and rebranded as "More Music 104.3", which later tweaked to Top 40 (CHR) competing with Clear Channel's heritage Top 40 station KKXL-FM "XL93".

former 104.3 KZLT logo

Due to inadequate ratings, KZLT reverted formats back to adult contemporary as "Lite Rock 104.3" on March 26, 2007. The station plays Christmas music annually from Thanksgiving to Christmas Day. In April 2012 the station rebranded itself using its call letters, "104.3 KZLT". In March 2013, the station reverted to the "Lite Rock 104.3" identity.

On April 11, 2014 KZLT-FM relaunched as "104.3 Cities FM".
