= KROX (AM) =

- Crookston, Minnesota; United States
- Broadcast area: Grand Forks, North Dakota
- Frequency: 1260 kHz
- Branding: KROX Radio 1260

Programming
- Format: News/talk; classic rock
- Affiliations: AP News; Minnesota Crookston Golden Eagles; Minnesota Golden Gophers; Minnesota Timberwolves; Minnesota Twins; Minnesota Vikings; Minnesota Wild

Ownership
- Owner: Frank Fee; (Gopher Communications)

History
- First air date: April 25, 1948
- Call sign meaning: Crookston

Technical information
- Licensing authority: FCC
- Facility ID: 24547
- Class: B
- Power: 1,000 watts day; 500 watts night
- Transmitter coordinates: 47°47′20″N 96°35′40″W
- Translators: 92.1 K221GU (Crookston); 105.7 K289CE (Grand Forks, North Dakota)

Links
- Public license information: Public file; LMS
- Webcast: Listen Live
- Website: kroxam.com

KROX (1260 kHz) is Crookston, Minnesota's only local AM radio station. It airs a locally based news/talk format in the day and a classic rock format at night. While not located in Grand Forks-East Grand Forks, the station receives most of its listening audience from that area. KROX also has earned the national Edward R. Murrow Award several times and the Associated Press best website for its website www.kroxam.com. KROX also broadcasts on translators K221GU (92.1 FM) in Grand Forks (licensed to Crookston) and K289CE (105.7 FM) in Crookston (licensed to Grand Forks).

KROX airs the local radio home to Minnesota Vikings and Minnesota Twins broadcasts. It also airs University of Minnesota Crookston Football, Volleyball and basketball games, Minnesota Timberwolves basketball, Minnesota Wild Hockey, Gopher Football, Basketball and Hockey. Crookston High School's football, volleyball, basketball, hockey, baseball and softball games.

== History ==
KROX began broadcasting April 25, 1948, on 1050 kHz with 1 KW power (daytime). It was owned by the Crookston Broadcasting Company.

Former logo
