= KJJK (AM) =

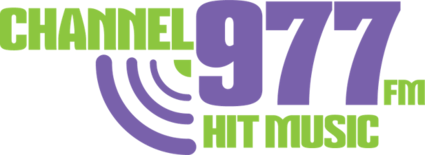
- Fergus Falls, Minnesota; United States
- Broadcast area: Fergus Falls, Minnesota
- Frequency: 1020 kHz
- Branding: Channel 977

Programming
- Format: Top 40/CHR
- Affiliations: Premiere Networks

Ownership
- Owner: Leighton Broadcasting; (Leighton Radio Holdings, Inc.)
- Sister stations: KBRF, KJJK-FM, KPRW, KZCR

History
- First air date: 1987

Technical information
- Licensing authority: FCC
- Facility ID: 76
- Class: D
- Power: 1,900 watts day; 11 watts night
- Transmitter coordinates: 46°14′42.9″N 95°58′47.2″W
- Translator: 97.7 K249EZ (Fergus Falls)

Links
- Public license information: Public file; LMS
- Webcast: Listen Live
- Website: Channel 977 Online

KJJK (1020 kHz) is an AM radio station licensed to Fergus Falls, Minnesota. The station serves the Fergus Falls-Detroit Lakes area. The station is currently owned by Leighton Broadcasting, through licensee Leighton Radio Holdings, Inc.

The studios and offices are west of downtown Fergus Falls, at 728 Western Avenue North, near I-94. It shares a transmitter site with KJJK-FM, southeast of Fergus Falls, near Wall Lake.

== History ==
The Federal Communications Commission issued a construction permit for the station on September 8, 1986. The station was assigned the KJJK call sign on September 23, 1986, and received its license to cover on February 12, 1987. The station formerly broadcast an oldies format as "Groovy 1020" and a sports talk format as "1020 The Game". The station was acquired by Leighton Broadcasting in 2015 as part of the Lakes Radio purchase.

On December 28, 2016, after running Christmas music through most of the month and stunting for 48 hours with non-stop music by Minneapolis native Prince, KJJK flipped to Top 40/CHR as "Channel 97.7", utilizing newly signed-on translator K249EZ to expand its signal to FM. An afternoon host using the name "McLovin" will debut in early January.
