= KJJK-FM =

Coordinates: 46.245°N 95.980°W

- Fergus Falls, Minnesota; United States
- Broadcast area: Fergus Falls, Minnesota
- Frequency: 96.5 MHz
- Branding: KJ Country 96.5 FM

Programming
- Format: Country

Ownership
- Owner: Leighton Broadcasting; (Leighton Radio Holdings, Inc.)
- Sister stations: KBRF, KJJK, KZCR, KPRW

History
- First air date: 1982
- Call sign meaning: "KJ Country"

Technical information
- Licensing authority: FCC
- Facility ID: 50758
- Class: C1
- ERP: 100,000 watts
- HAAT: 171 meters (561 ft)

Links
- Public license information: Public file; LMS
- Webcast: Listen Live
- Website: KJJK-FM website

KJJK-FM (96.5 MHz, "KJ Country") is a radio station broadcasting a country music format serving Fergus Falls, Minnesota. The station is owned by Leighton Broadcasting, through licensee Leighton Radio Holdings, Inc.

The station first signed on the air in 1982. The station airs a Country music format, branded as "KJ Country 96.5 FM."

The station features local on-air talent during the day, including the Kelly Jordan Show in the morning and Brook Stephens.

The studios and offices are west of downtown Fergus Falls, at 728 Western Avenue North, near I-94. It shares a transmitter site with KJJK (AM), southeast of Fergus Falls, near Wall Lake.
