= KWNO (AM) =

- Winona, Minnesota; United States
- Broadcast area: Winona
- Frequency: 1230 kHz
- Branding: KWNO 1230 AM/98.7 FM

Programming
- Format: News/talk/sports
- Affiliations: ABC News Radio; Compass Media Networks; Premiere Networks; Westwood One; Minnesota Twins; Minnesota Timberwolves

Ownership
- Owner: Leighton Broadcasting; (Leighton Radio Holdings, Inc.)
- Sister stations: KGSL, KHWK, KWMN, KRIV-FM

History
- First air date: January 16, 1938
- Call sign meaning: Winona

Technical information
- Licensing authority: FCC
- Facility ID: 72152
- Class: C
- Power: 1,000 watts day; 990 watts night
- Transmitter coordinates: 44°01′52″N 91°38′31″W
- Translator: 98.7 K254CM (Winona)

Links
- Public license information: Public file; LMS
- Webcast: Listen Live
- Website: winonaradio.com

KWNO (1230 kHz) is an American AM radio station which first went on the air on January 16, 1938. It was the first local radio station in Winona, Minnesota. It was Winona's only station until 1957.

It is owned by Leighton Broadcasting, through licensee Leighton Radio Holdings, Inc., and is located at 752 Bluffview Circle, with its other sister stations, KHWK, KGSL, KWMN, and KRIV-FM.
