= KWMN =

Coordinates: 43.942°N 91.719°W

- Rushford, Minnesota; United States
- Broadcast area: Winona, Minnesota
- Frequency: 99.3 MHz
- Branding: The Fan Winona

Programming
- Format: Sports
- Affiliations: Fox Sports Radio; Minnesota Wild; Fan Radio Network

Ownership
- Owner: Leighton Broadcasting; (Leighton Radio Holdings, Inc.)
- Sister stations: KHWK, KWNO, KGSL, KRIV-FM

History
- First air date: December 18, 1991
- Former call signs: KWNO-FM (1991–2019); KHWK-FM (2019–2021)
- Call sign meaning: Winona, Minnesota

Technical information
- Licensing authority: FCC
- Facility ID: 72153
- Class: C3
- ERP: 12,000 watts
- HAAT: 151 meters (495 ft)

Links
- Public license information: Public file; LMS
- Webcast: Listen Live
- Website: KWMN Online

KWMN (99.3 FM) is a radio station serving the Winona, Minnesota area. It airs a sports format, primarily carrying programming from KFAN in Minneapolis.

The station is owned by Leighton Broadcasting, through licensee Leighton Radio Holdings, Inc., and is located at 752 Bluffview Circle, with its other sister stations, KHWK, KGSL, KWNO, and KRIV-FM.

On March 4, 2019, KWNO-FM rebranded as "99.3 The Hawk" under new KHWK-FM calls (the call sign was changed on March 1).

On August 23, 2021, the station flipped to a sports talk format branded as the "Winona Sports Network" under new callsign KWMN. The station will carry University of Minnesota football and basketball, Minnesota Timberwolves basketball, Minnesota Wild hockey, and football and basketball from three local high schools: Winona, Cotter, and Rushford-Peterson. Outside of the local broadcasts, the station will carry programming from Fox Sports Radio.

On February 9, 2026, the station picked up the regionally syndicated KFAN programing, becoming known as "The Fan Winona".
