= KIKV-FM =

Radio station in Sauk Centre, Minnesota

- Sauk Centre, Minnesota; United States
- Broadcast area: Alexandria, Minnesota
- Frequency: 100.7 MHz
- Branding: KIK FM 100.7

Programming
- Format: Country
- Affiliations: Minnesota Vikings

Ownership
- Owner: Hubbard Broadcasting, Inc.; (HBI Radio Alexandria, LLC)
- Sister stations: KSAX, KULO

History
- First air date: October 1970 (as KCMT-FM)
- Former call signs: KCMT-FM (1970–1985)
- Call sign meaning: KIK FM (V)

Technical information
- Facility ID: 4336
- Class: C1
- ERP: 100,000 watts
- HAAT: 361 meters (1,184 feet)
- Transmitter coordinates: 45°41′59″N 95°10′36″W

Links
- Webcast: Listen Live
- Website: kikvradio.com

KIKV-FM (100.7 MHz, "Kik FM") is a radio station airing a country format. Its sister station is KULO 94.3 FM. Both studios are located at 604 3rd Ave. West in Alexandria, Minnesota.

The station is licensed by the Federal Communications Commission (FCC) to nearby Sauk Centre, Minnesota.

== History ==
The station went on the air in October 1970 as KCMT-FM, owned by the Central Minnesota Television Company along with KCMT television (channel 7; later KCCO-TV, a satellite of WCCO-TV; now defunct). The two stations were separated in 1985, when KCMT-FM was purchased by Lusk Broadcasting and became KIKV-FM. BDI Broadcasting bought the station in 1989; the station eventually came under the Omni Broadcasting banner. Formerly licensed to Alexandria, the city of license was changed to Sauk Centre in 2003 to allow sister station KULO (94.3 FM) to move from Sauk Centre to Alexandria.

Hubbard Broadcasting, Inc. announced on November 13, 2014 that it would purchase the Omni Broadcasting stations, including KIKV-FM. Hubbard already owned television station KSAX (channel 42, a satellite of KSTP-TV) in Alexandria. The sale was completed on February 27, 2015, at a purchase price of $8 million for the 16 stations and one translator.
