= KRIV-FM =

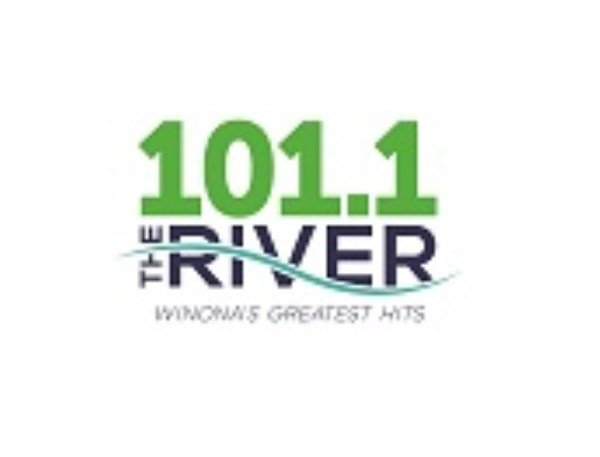
- Winona, Minnesota; United States
- Broadcast area: Winona County, Minnesota
- Frequency: 101.1 MHz
- Branding: 101.1 The River

Programming
- Format: Classic hits
- Affiliations: Westwood One

Ownership
- Owner: Leighton Media; (Leighton Radio Holdings, Inc.)

History
- First air date: June 4, 1992
- Former call signs: KHME (1991–2015)
- Call sign meaning: "River"

Technical information
- Licensing authority: FCC
- Facility ID: 27534
- Class: C3
- ERP: 5,000 watts
- HAAT: 226 m (741 ft)
- Transmitter coordinates: 44°4′25.9″N 91°34′38.5″W

Links
- Public license information: Public file; LMS
- Webcast: Listen live
- Website: winonaradio.com/the-river-101-1-home

KRIV-FM (101.1 FM) is a radio station broadcasting a classic hits format. Licensed to Winona, Minnesota, United States, the station serves the La Crosse, Wisconsin, area. KRIV-FM features programming from Westwood One.

The station is owned by Leighton Media, through licensee Leighton Radio Holdings, Inc., and is located at 752 Bluffview Circle, with its other sister stations, KHWK, KGSL, KWMN, KWNO.
