= Belgrade-Brooten-Elrosa High School =

Location
- 710 Washburn Ave; Belgrade, Minnesota 56312; USA; 45.446503°N 95.004066°W

Information
- Type: Public
- Established: 1987
- Superintendent: Patrick Walsh
- Principal: Laura Spainer
- Teaching staff: 24.95 (on an FTE basis)
- Grades: 6–12
- Enrollment: 317 (2023–2024)
- Student to teacher ratio: 12.71
- Color
- Mascot: Jaguar
- Website: https://www.bbejaguars.org/high-school

Belgrade-Brooten-Elrosa High School (or simply BBE High School) is located in Belgrade, Minnesota. The school enrolls 6th-12th grade students in the Belgrade-Brooten-Elrosa School District.

== History ==
This school was formerly the Belgrade and Brooten school districts. When these schools did not have enough children to keep the schools running, they merged in 1989. However, Belgrade elementary school did not merge with Brooten until 1994.

In 2005, BBE had their first state team participant, winning the 6AA championship in volleyball. They lost to Stewartville and St. Cloud Cathedral. Volleyball went to state again in 2007 (section 6AA champions), losing to Mayer Lutheran and St. Cloud Cathedral.

In 2011, BBE made it to state with their Boys Basketball team. Their only loss of the year came in the state championship against Springfield, which gave them a record of 32–1, and second overall. Also, in 2012, they again made it to finals and played Southwest Minnesota Christian and won class 1A championship, finishing the school's first ever "perfect season" going 33–0. In 2014, the Boys Basketball team claimed their second state championship with a 62–50 defeat of Rushford-Peterson.

In 2013, the football team made it to the section finals but lost in the final seconds to ACGC.

The girls volleyball team has made it to State in 2018 and 2019. The girls basketball team made it to state for the first time ever in 2019.

== Students ==
There are about 300 students in the Grades 7–12. The student:teacher ratio is 1:16. Next year, 2021–2022, the 6th Grade will move over from Brooten to create a 6-8 grade middle school in Belgrade.

== Extra-curricular activities ==
Belgrade-Brooten-Elrosa High School is a member the MSHSL and the Central Minnesota Conference, this school has these after-school activities:

Fall	Winter	Spring
Tennis, Girls	Basketball, Boys and Girls	Baseball
Football	Wrestling	Golf, Boys and Girls
Cross Country, Boys and Girls	Dance Team, Girls	Track and Field, Boys and Girls
Volleyball, Girls	Hockey, Boys (River Lakes Stars)	Softball
		Speech

The school theater department also performs plays throughout the year, along with a yearly musical.
