= East Grand Forks, Minnesota =

City in Minnesota, United States

- City
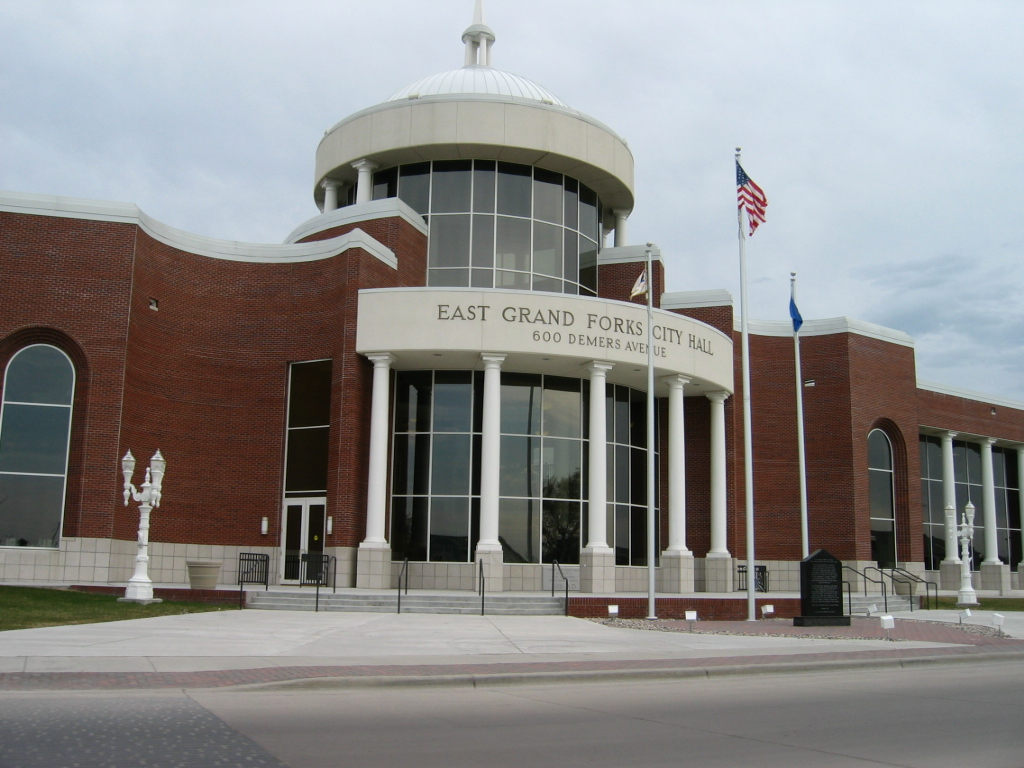
- East Grand Forks City Hall

- Flag
- Nickname: The Grand Cities
- Location of East Grand Forks in Polk County, Minnesota
- Coordinates: 47.928573°N 97.013814°W
- Country: United States
- State: Minnesota
- County: Polk
- Metro: Greater Grand Forks
- Established: 1887
- Incorporated: April 13, 1887

Government
  - Type: Council–manager government
  - Mayor: Mark Olstad
  - Administrator: Reid Huttunen
  - Finance Director: Karla Anderson
  - At Large: Brian Larson; Karen Peterson
  - Councilmembers: 1st Ward: Tami Schumacher; 2nd Ward: Ben Pokrzywinski; 3rd Ward: Tim Riopelle; 4th Ward: Dale Helms; 5th Ward: Donald Casmey

Area
  - City: 5.946 sq mi (15.401 km^{2})
  - Land: 5.946 sq mi (15.401 km^{2})
  - Water: 0 sq mi (0.000 km^{2})
  - Urban: 26.48 sq mi (68.59 km^{2})
  - Metro: 3,407 sq mi (8,825 km^{2})
- Elevation: 833 ft (254 m)

Population (2020)
  - City: 9,176
  - Estimate (2024): 8,915
  - Density: 1,499.3/sq mi (578.89/km^{2})
  - Urban: 68,160 (US: 411th)
  - Urban density: 2,574/sq mi (993.7/km^{2})
  - Metro: 104,184 (US: 356th)
  - Metro density: 30.6/sq mi (11.81/km^{2})
- Time zone: UTC−6 (Central (CST))
  - Summer (DST): UTC−5 (CDT)
- ZIP Code: 56721
- Area code: 218
- FIPS code: 27-17612
- GNIS feature ID: 2394599
- Highways: US 2, MN 220
- Sales tax: 8.375%
- Website: www.eastgrandforks.gov

East Grand Forks (also known as EGF) is a city in Polk County, Minnesota, United States. The population was 9,176 at the 2020 census, making it Polk County's largest community. It is in the Red River Valley region along the eastern bank of the Red River of the North, directly across from Grand Forks, North Dakota. The cities of Grand Forks and East Grand Forks form the center of the Grand Forks, ND–MN Metropolitan Statistical Area, which is often called Greater Grand Forks. The statistical area's population was 104,362 at the 2020 census.

== History ==
A post office called East Grand Forks has been in operation since 1883. The city was named for its location east of Grand Forks, North Dakota. East Grand Forks was incorporated on April 13, 1887.

=== Flood of 1997 ===
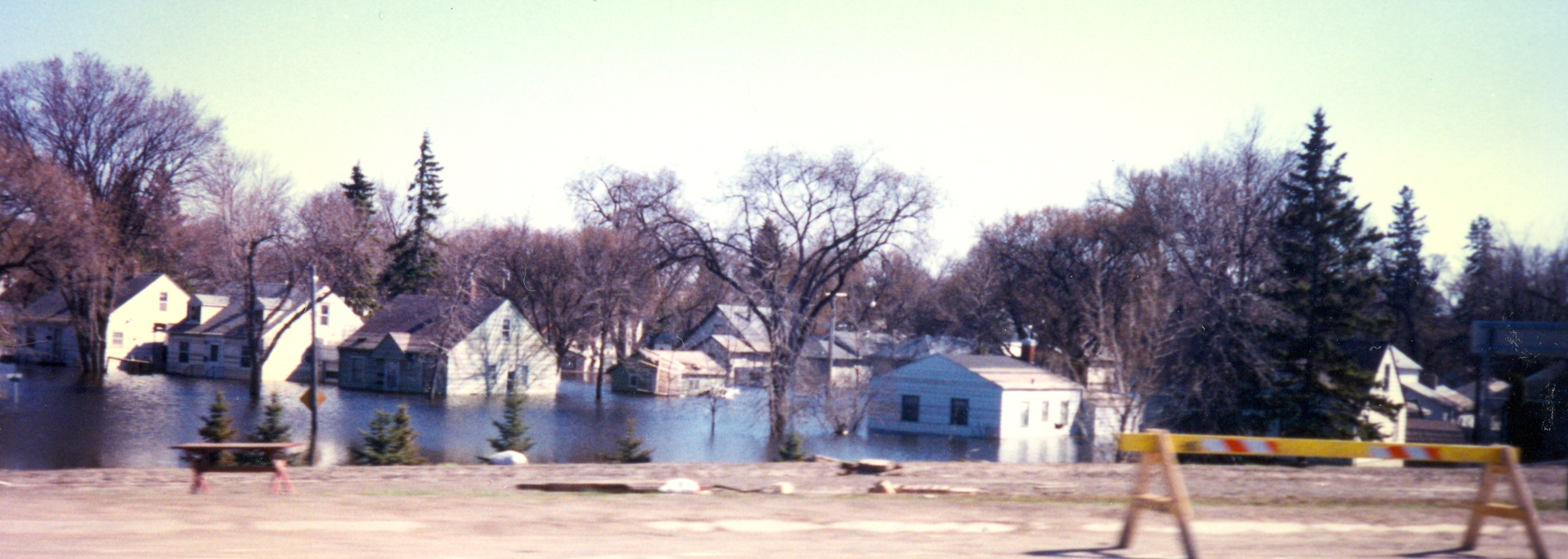
A residential neighborhood in East Grand Forks flooded in late April 1997

East Grand Forks, along with Grand Forks, was heavily damaged by a major flood in 1997. The entire city was under a mandatory evacuation and almost no homes were spared damage. After the flood, several neighborhoods had to be demolished because of damage. The city cleared development from the floodplain bordering the Red and Red Lake rivers. It developed a large park known as the Greater Grand Forks Greenway to provide a new recreation area for residents along the river. A similar park was developed in Grand Forks. The parklands, with trees and a variety of greenery, can absorb floodwaters and help protect the cities naturally. Moving residential and business development out of these areas also helps prevent future flood damage. In addition, a new system of dikes was constructed to protect the city from future flooding. The city has since rebuilt.

== Geography ==
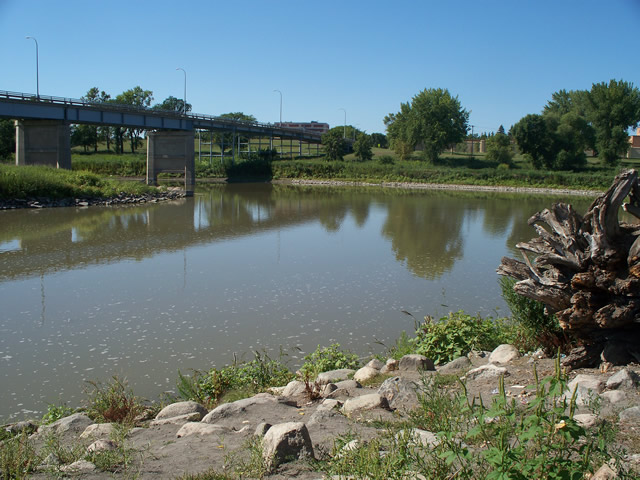
The confluence of the Red and Red Lake Rivers

East Grand Forks is in the flat, fertile Red River Valley, formed by the ancient glacial Lake Agassiz.

East Grand Forks developed on both sides of the Red Lake River, which joins with the Red River in town. The main part of town is north of the river; this was the original section, which developed as the downtown area, as well as several early residential neighborhoods. The area south of the river is known as "The Point". The land narrows almost to a peninsula at the confluence of the Red and Red Lake rivers. "The Point" contains more residential development.

According to the United States Census Bureau, the city has an area of 5.946 square miles (15.40 km^{2}), all land.

== Demographics ==
Historical population
Census	Pop.	Note	%±
1890	795		—
1900	2,077		161.3%
1910	2,533		22.0%
1920	2,490		−1.7%
1930	2,922		17.3%
1940	3,511		20.2%
1950	5,049		43.8%
1960	6,998		38.6%
1970	7,607		8.7%
1980	8,537		12.2%
1990	8,658		1.4%
2000	7,501		−13.4%
2010	8,601		14.7%
2020	9,176		6.7%
2024 (est.)	8,915		−2.8%
U.S. Decennial Census; 2020 Census

As of the 2023 American Community Survey, there are 3,461 estimated households in East Grand Forks with an average of 2.58 persons per household. The city has a median household income of $74,618. Approximately 10.8% of the city's population lives at or below the poverty line. East Grand Forks has an estimated 71.5% employment rate, with 28.9% of the population holding a bachelor's degree or higher and 94.4% holding a high school diploma.

The top five reported ancestries (people were allowed to report up to two ancestries, thus the figures will generally add to more than 100%) were English (94.4%), Spanish (2.0%), Indo-European (0.5%), Asian and Pacific Islander (0.2%), and Other (2.9%).

=== Racial and ethnic composition ===
East Grand Forks, Minnesota – racial and ethnic composition Note: the US Census treats Hispanic/Latino as an ethnic category. This table excludes Latinos from the racial categories and assigns them to a separate category. Hispanics/Latinos may be of any race.
Race / ethnicity (NH = non-Hispanic)	Pop. 1990	Pop. 2000	Pop. 2010	Pop. 2020	% 1990	% 2000	% 2010	% 2020
White alone (NH)	7,813	6,658	7,571	7,365	90.24%	88.76%	88.02%	80.26%
Black or African American alone (NH)	23	30	103	677	0.27%	0.40%	1.20%	7.38%
Native American or Alaska Native alone (NH)	169	112	141	122	1.95%	1.49%	1.64%	1.33%
Asian alone (NH)	31	25	44	53	0.36%	0.33%	0.51%	0.58%
Pacific Islander alone (NH)	—	1	1	1	—	0.01%	0.01%	0.01%
Other race alone (NH)	9	0	4	19	0.10%	0.00%	0.05%	0.21%
Mixed race or multiracial (NH)	—	110	174	371	—	1.47%	2.02%	4.04%
Hispanic or Latino (any race)	613	565	563	568	7.08%	7.53%	6.55%	6.19%
Total	8,658	7,501	8,601	9,176	100.00%	100.00%	100.00%	100.00%

=== 2020 census ===
As of the 2020 census, East Grand Forks had a population of 9,176. There were 3,599 households and 2,289 families. The population density was 1,543.2 inhabitants per square mile (595.8/km^{2}). There were 3,831 housing units at an average density of 644.3 per square mile (248.8/km^{2}).

The median age was 35.3 years. 27.9% of residents were under the age of 18 and 14.4% of residents were 65 years of age or older. For every 100 females there were 98.4 males, and for every 100 females age 18 and over there were 92.9 males age 18 and over.

98.7% of residents lived in urban areas, while 1.3% lived in rural areas.

There were 3,599 households in East Grand Forks, of which 33.6% had children under the age of 18 living in them. Of all households, 47.5% were married-couple households, 18.7% were households with a male householder and no spouse or partner present, and 27.4% were households with a female householder and no spouse or partner present. About 30.6% of all households were made up of individuals and 11.7% had someone living alone who was 65 years of age or older.

There were 3,831 housing units, of which 6.1% were vacant. The homeowner vacancy rate was 1.5% and the rental vacancy rate was 9.8%.

=== 2010 census ===
As of the 2010 census, there were 8,601 people, 3,488 households, and 2,258 families residing in the city. The population density was 1,455.6 inhabitants per square mile (562.0/km^{2}). There were 3,626 housing units at an average density of 613.5 inhabitants per square mile (236.9/km^{2}). The racial makeup of the city was 91.11% White, 1.27% African American, 1.79% Native American, 0.56% Asian, 0.01% Pacific Islander, 2.41% from some other races and 2.86% from two or more races. Hispanic or Latino people of any race were 6.55% of the population.

There were 3,488 households, of which 33.8% had children under the age of 18 living with them, 49.3% were married couples living together, 11.8% had a female householder with no husband present, 3.7% had a male householder with no wife present, and 35.3% were non-families. 28.7% of all households were made up of individuals, and 12% had someone living alone who was 65 years of age or older. The average household size was 2.45 and the average family size was 3.03.

The median age in the city was 35 years. 25.8% of residents were under the age of 18; 10.5% were between the ages of 18 and 24; 25.8% were from 25 to 44; 24.8% were from 45 to 64; and 13.3% were 65 years of age or older. The gender makeup of the city was 49.2% male and 50.8% female.

=== 2000 census ===
As of the 2000 census, there were 7,501 people, 2,929 households, and 1,933 families residing in the city. The population density was 1,501.5 inhabitants per square mile (579.7/km^{2}). There were 3,108 housing units at an average density of 622.1 inhabitants per square mile (240.2/km^{2}). The racial makeup of the city was 90.97% White, 0.52% African American, 1.68% Native American, 0.33% Asian, 0.01% Pacific Islander, 4.47% from some other races and 2.01% from two or more races. Hispanic or Latino people of any race were 7.53% of the population.

There were 2,929 households, out of which 36.8% had children under the age of 18 living with them, 51.3% were married couples living together, 11.2% had a female householder with no husband present, and 34.0% were non-families. 28.1% of all households were made up of individuals, and 10.8% had someone living alone who was 65 years of age or older. The average household size was 2.54 and the average family size was 3.16.

In the city, the population was spread out, with 28.8% under the age of 18, 10.8% from 18 to 24, 27.8% from 25 to 44, 20.9% from 45 to 64, and 11.7% who were 65 years of age or older. The median age was 34 years. For every 100 females, there were 98.0 males. For every 100 females age 18 and over, there were 94.6 males.

The median income for a household in the city was $35,866, and the median income for a family was $47,846. Males had a median income of $33,134 versus $22,094 for females. The per capita income for the city was $16,599. About 8.2% of families and 12.4% of the population were below the poverty line, including 15.7% of those under age 18 and 8.6% of those age 65 or over.

== Economy ==
=== Largest employers ===
According to its 2023 Annual Comprehensive Financial Report, the city's largest employers are:

#	Employer	Number of employees	Percentage
1	East Grand Forks Public Schools ISD 595	367	14.62%
2	American Crystal Sugar Company	320	12.74%
3	R. J. Zavoral and Sons, Inc.	151	6.01%
4	City of East Grand Forks	95	3.78%
5	Northland Community & Technical College	77	3.07%
6	Sacred Heart	75	2.99%
7	Northern Valley	70	2.79%
8	Sanford Health	59	2.35%
9	Vallet Markets	52	2.07%
10	Mayo Manufacturing, Inc.	35	1.39%
Total	—	1,301	51.83%

== Education ==
=== K–12 ===
The East Grand Forks School District enrolls 1,758 students and operates two elementary schools (South Point Elementary and New Heights Elementary), Central Middle School, and East Grand Forks Senior High School. There are also two private Christian schools. Sacred Heart School is a Roman Catholic school with students from across the region, including North Dakota and Minnesota. Riverside Christian School is a nondenominational Christian elementary, middle, and high school.

- 1,942 students in 2023-2024
- 1,811 students in February 2023

=== Higher education ===
East Grand Forks's only higher educational institution is Northland Community & Technical College, Northland for short, which has another campus in Thief River Falls. The history of Northland Community & Technical College's East Grand Forks campus dates to December 1971, when the local school district was designated for an Area Vocational Technical Institute (AVTI). The first classes of the East Grand Forks AVTI were offered in 1973 in rented facilities. The present facility opened in 1975. Northland-EGF grew with expansion and partnerships.

The college's name has changed several times. From 1992 to 2003 it was consolidated as Northwest Technical College. In July 2003, Northwest Technical College's East Grand Forks campus merged with Thief River Falls's Northland Community & Technical College to become a fully comprehensive college. The two-year school's enrollment has grown steadily since.

Across the Red River in Grand Forks is the University of North Dakota.

== Infrastructure ==
East Grand Forks is served by three Cities Area Transit bus routes that connect the city to Grand Forks.

U.S. Route 2, U.S. 2 Business Route, and Minnesota Highway 220 are three of the main roadways in the city. Other nearby routes in the Grand Forks-East Grand Forks area include Interstate Highway 29, to the west of Grand Fork's downtown, and U.S. Highway 81.

East Grand Forks is served by Grand Forks International Airport, located west of Grand Forks, North Dakota. Commercial flights are operated by Allegiant and Delta Air Lines.

== Commerce and recreation ==
East Grand Forks has a downtown shopping district that includes a small shopping center, a 12-screen movie theater, a Cabela's sporting goods store, and several local restaurants.

After the 1997 flood, the Federal Emergency Management Agency (FEMA) recommended against replacing residential or business development in the floodplain. The land on both sides of the river was developed as a park and state recreation area called the Red River State Recreation Area. It is part of the Greater Grand Forks Greenway. It provides a place for residents to enjoy recreation near the river, as well as protecting the cities. The trees and greenery in this zone can help absorb future seasonal flooding. In the northern part of town is a public golf course, Valley Golf Course.

== Local events ==
East Grand Forks has several annual local community events, such as the Catfish Days and Frosty Bobber fishing tournaments, Heritage Days, and arts and crafts shows. EGF shares certain events with Grand Forks, such as the Potato Bowl parade and First Night, an alcohol-free New Year's celebration. Catfish Days, based on an annual summer catfishing tournament, attracts people from all over the U.S. and Canada. It is one of the region's largest fishing tournaments.

Each June, the Grand Cities Art Fest takes place in the downtowns of Grand Forks and East Grand Forks. The city holds an Art & Wine Walk one Saturday each month during the summer. A farmer's market is another popular event. Local produce and craft items are for sale in the Town Square on Saturdays from late June till late September.

== Media ==
East Grand Forks has a local weekly newspaper, The Exponent. Otherwise, the town is served by the media of Grand Forks and KROX of Crookston, Minnesota. Radio stations KZLT and KGFK broadcasting from Grand Forks are licensed to East Grand Forks.

== Notable people ==
- Kurt Knoff, NFL player
- Pat Owens, mayor of Grand Forks during the 1997 Red River flood
- Carl Panzram, serial killer, mass rapist, and arsonist
- Molly Yeh, author, restaurateur, and TV host
