= KKXL-FM =

Contemporary hit radio station in Grand Forks, North Dakota

- Grand Forks, North Dakota; United States
- Broadcast area: Greater Grand Forks
- Frequency: 92.9 MHz
- RDS: XL93 GRAND FORKS
- Branding: XL93

Programming
- Format: Contemporary hit radio
- Affiliations: Premiere Networks

Ownership
- Owner: iHeartMedia; (iHM Licenses, LLC)
- Sister stations: KJKJ; KKXL; KQHT; KSNR

History
- First air date: March 10, 1975
- Former call signs: KKXL-FM (1974–1975); KKDQ (1975–1981)
- Call sign meaning: XL93, abbreviation for EXtra Large

Technical information
- Licensing authority: FCC
- Facility ID: 20325
- Class: C1
- ERP: 100,000 watts
- HAAT: 109 m (358 ft)
- Transmitter coordinates: 47.964°N 97.030°W

Links
- Public license information: Public file; LMS
- Webcast: Listen live (via iHeartRadio)
- Website: xl93.iheart.com

KKXL-FM (92.9 MHz) is an adult-leaning contemporary hit radio station serving the Grand Forks, North Dakota area. It first began broadcasting in the 1970s as KKDQ. The station is owned by iHeartMedia (formerly Clear Channel Communications until September 2014), and competes with Leighton Broadcasting's KZGF "Z94.7".

== History ==
former logo until 2015

KKXL-FM signed on March 10, 1975, as a counterpart to KKXL (1440 AM). The call letters were KKDQ from June 30, 1975, to July 27, 1981.

KKXL-FM signed on in 1981 in Grand Forks with a Top 40 format. The station rivaled with now co-owned KQHT "Magic 96" during the late 1980s and 1990s, competed with KYTN "Y95" during the late 1980s, the short-lived KZLT-FM "More Music 104.3" during 2006 and 2007, and currently with KZGF "Z94.7". Famous former DJ's include Rockin' Rick from 1990 to 2017, Mike Danger from 1990 to 1994, Micheal Right & Kevin Hendrickson during the '80s.

== Programming ==
Weekday programming includes "The Fred Show", On Air with Ryan Seacrest, Sarah-Ruth on afternoons, RJ on nights, and EJ on overnights. Notable weekend programming includes Most Requested Live with Romeo on Saturday nights, Sonrise with Kevin Peterson, Backtrax USA, and American Top 40 with Ryan Seacrest.
