= KXRA (AM) =

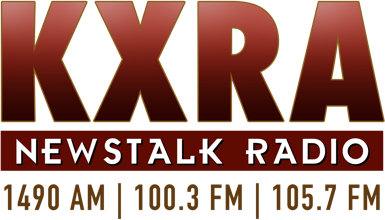
- Alexandria, Minnesota; United States
- Broadcast area: Alexandria, Minnesota
- Frequency: 1490 kHz
- Branding: 1490 KXRA

Programming
- Format: News/Talk
- Affiliations: Compass Media Networks; Townhall News; Westwood One

Ownership
- Owner: Leighton Broadcasting; (Leighton Radio Holdings, Inc.)
- Sister stations: KXRA-FM, KXRZ

History
- First air date: July 27, 1949
- Call sign meaning: Approximation of Alexandria

Technical information
- Licensing authority: FCC
- Facility ID: 51523
- Class: C
- Power: 1,000 watts
- Transmitter coordinates: 45°52′06″N 95°21′48″W
- Translators: 100.3 K262AT (Alexandria); 105.7 K289CL (Glenwood)

Links
- Public license information: Public file; LMS
- Webcast: Listen live
- Website: voiceofalexandria.com/kxra

KXRA is a news/talk on 1490 AM and translator channels K262AT at 100.3 FM in Alexandria, Minnesota and K289CL at 105.7 FM in Glenwood, Minnesota owned by Leighton Broadcasting, which also owns KXRZ and KXRA-FM.

== History ==
KXRA was founded on July 27, 1949, by the Alexandria Broadcasting Corporation. The station's original leadership included founders Everette Q. Walters and R.C. Brown. For nearly 40 years, it operated under this local ownership before being purchased by Paradis Broadcasting in 1988. The Paradis family, led by General Manager Brett Paradis, operated the station for 31 years, during which time they expanded the company's holdings to include FM sister stations KXRA-FM and KXRZ. In February 2020, the station was acquired by Leighton Broadcasting for $3.4 million.

The station is known for its long-running local programs, including Open Line, a community forum, and Swap Shop. The station operates under the branding "Voice of Alexandria." KXRA also serves as the flagship station for Alexandria Area High School athletics, branding itself as the "Voice of the Cardinals" for football, basketball, and hockey coverage.
