= Wall Lake (Minnesota) =

Lake in the state of Minnesota, United States

- Location within Minnesota
- Location: Otter Tail County, Minnesota
- Coordinates: 46°16′20″N 95°57′45″W
- Type: lake

Wall Lake is a lake in Otter Tail County, in the U.S. state of Minnesota.

Wall Lake was named for its wall-like rocky shore.

== See also ==
- List of lakes in Minnesota
