= KULO =

Coordinates: 45°56′25″N 95°28′03″W

- Alexandria, Minnesota; United States
- Broadcast area: West Central Minnesota
- Frequency: 94.3 MHz
- Branding: Cool 94.3

Programming
- Format: Classic hits
- Affiliations: Compass Media Networks; Premiere Networks; Westwood One; Minnesota Twins

Ownership
- Owner: Hubbard Broadcasting, Inc.; (HBI Radio Alexandria, LLC)
- Sister stations: KIKV-FM, KSAX

History
- First air date: 1976 (as KMSR)
- Former call signs: KMSR (1976–2003)
- Call sign meaning: Sounds like "Cool"

Technical information
- Licensing authority: FCC
- Facility ID: 23091
- Class: C3
- ERP: 12,000 watts
- HAAT: 142 meters

Links
- Public license information: Public file; LMS
- Webcast: Listen Live
- Website: cool943.com

KULO (94.3 FM, "Cool 94.3") is a radio station in Alexandria, Minnesota, with a classic hits format. KULO plays 'The Lakes Greatest Hits' including the best music from the 1970s to the 1990s. Cool 94.3 also serves as the Lakes Area's Christmas music station. On the day after Thanksgiving, Cool 94.3 switches over to a Christmas music format through Christmas Day.

== History ==
The station first signed on the air in 1976 with the call sign KMSR. It originally broadcast from Sauk Centre, Minnesota, before its operations were moved to Alexandria. The call sign was later changed to KULO in 2003, with the station adopting the nickname "Cool 94.3" to match the pronunciation of the new letters.

The station and its cluster of sister stations were previously owned by Omni Broadcasting, a major regional media company. In late 2014, Hubbard Broadcasting, Inc. announced it would purchase KULO and the other Omni stations. The sale, which included 16 stations and one translator, was completed in February 2015 for a purchase price of $8 million.

Hubbard already owned television station KSAX (channel 42, a satellite of KSTP-TV) in Alexandria. The sale was completed on February 27, 2015, at a purchase price of $8 million for the 16 stations and one translator.
