= KXRA-FM =

Coordinates: 45.9319°N 95.4456°W

- Alexandria, Minnesota; United States
- Frequency: 92.3 MHz
- Branding: KX92

Programming
- Format: Classic rock

Ownership
- Owner: Leighton Broadcasting; (Leighton Radio Holdings, Inc.)
- Sister stations: KXRZ, KXRA

History
- First air date: 1968
- Former frequencies: 92.7 MHz
- Call sign meaning: From "Alexandria"

Technical information
- Licensing authority: FCC
- Facility ID: 51525
- Class: C3
- ERP: 13,500 watts
- HAAT: 136 meters

Links
- Public license information: Public file; LMS
- Webcast: Listen Live
- Website: voiceofalexandria.com/kx92

KXRA-FM (92.3 FM, "KX92") is a classic rock music radio station in Alexandria, Minnesota, United States, owned by Leighton Broadcasting, which also owns KXRZ and KXRA.

== History ==
KXRA-FM first signed on the air in 1968 on the frequency 92.7 MHz. The station was established as the FM counterpart to the longtime local AM station, KXRA (1490 AM). It later moved to its current frequency of 92.3 MHz. KXRA-FM was part of the group owned by Paradis Broadcasting of Alexandria, Inc., a family company led by Mel and Brett Paradis. They operated the station for decades alongside KXRA (AM) and KXRZ (99.3 FM). In February 2020, the station was acquired by Leighton Broadcasting (Leighton Radio Holdings, Inc.) as part of a multi-station deal involving KXRA (AM) and KXRZ. The purchase price for the entire cluster was reported as $3.4 million.
