= KJKJ =

Radio station in Grand Forks, North Dakota

Grand Forks, North Dakota; United States
- Frequency: 107.5 MHz
- Branding: KJ108

Programming
- Format: Active rock

Ownership
- Owner: iHeartMedia, Inc.; (iHM Licenses, LLC)
- Sister stations: KKXL, KKXL-FM, KQHT, KSNR

History
- First air date: August 1985

Technical information
- Licensing authority: FCC
- Facility ID: 35012
- Class: C1
- ERP: 100,000 watts
- HAAT: 139 meters (456 ft)
- Transmitter coordinates: 47.964°N 97.030°W

Links
- Public license information: Public file; LMS
- Webcast: Listen live (via iHeartRadio)
- Website: kjkj.iheart.com

KJKJ (107.5 FM, "KJ108") is an American commercial active rock radio station serving Grand Forks, North Dakota, United States. It first began broadcasting in 1985. The station is currently owned by iHeartMedia, Inc. and the station's broadcast license is held by iHM Licenses, LLC. KJKJ primarily competes with Leighton Broadcasting's classic rock 1590 KGFK/95.7 K239BG/97.5 K248DH "Rock 95".

== Programming ==
Weekday personalities on KJKJ include the "BigDogz" morning show, Scott Gilbert on mid-days, Jon Roberts on afternoons.

=== The BigDogz ===
The station's coarse comedy satirical news and variety morning show pranksters, The BigDogz (sometimes spelled Dawgz), is one of the first of their type, commonly compared to the syndicated morning show Bob and Tom, Tom Barnard's show on KQRS-FM, and Howard Stern. The BigDogz is hosted by Bill Tanner, Scott Gilbert and on salute to women Wednesday's includes Carrisa (spelling may differ). BigDogz has been on the air since 1995. The BigDogz are known mainly for satire of local and national events; mixed with a variety of characters. The BigDogz talk weekly to comedian Bob Zany and host him annually for a series of comedy shows typically held at Muddy Rivers Ballrooms.

Former hosts also include Pat Mars.

== History ==
KJKJ first signed on in August 1985 as "Rock 108" with an album-oriented rock (AOR), a predecessor to today's classic rock format, similar to that of the well-known KQRS-FM in Minneapolis, Minnesota. During the early 1990s, Rock 108 tweaked to classic rock, the descendant of the AOR format. In 1986, Ingstad Broadcasting bought KJKJ from Justin Horberg with an undisclosed price. In 1995, The BigDogz debuted as their satirical news morning show, sometimes being compared to morning shows such as the syndicated Bob and Tom, Tom Barnard of KQRS-FM in Minneapolis-St. Paul, and Howard Stern, and has been the top-rated morning show for many years. Clear Channel Communications bought out several radio stations including KJ108 in 2000, and KJ108's format evolved into a broad based rock formatted station; playing a mix of classic rock and mainstream rock from the 1960s, 1970s, 1980s, 1990s, 2000s, to the latest from Five Finger Death Punch, Pop Evil, Seether, and other mainstream active rock artists. The music consists of a mix of today's heavy metal, alternative and hard active rock. The station is known to play new active rock as soon as it reaches radio. KJ108 also plays album tracks not heard on radio reminiscent of album oriented rock as it one of the largest libraries of classic, recurrent mainstream, and active rock in the Great Plains. The station with the Big Dogs morning show creates a mass appeal rock station and can be heard through most of eastern North Dakota and Northwest Minnesota.
