= KKXL (AM) =

Radio station in Grand Forks, ND, USA

- Grand Forks, North Dakota; United States
- Broadcast area: Greater Grand Forks
- Frequency: 1440 kHz
- Branding: 1440 The Fan

Programming
- Format: Sports
- Affiliations: KFXN-FM/Minneapolis; ESPN Radio; Minnesota Vikings; Minnesota Wild

Ownership
- Owner: iHeartMedia, Inc.; (iHM Licenses, LLC)
- Sister stations: KJKJ, KKXL-FM, KQHT, KSNR

History
- First air date: November 1, 1941
- Former call signs: KILO (1941–1973)
- Call sign meaning: Abbreviation for extra large

Technical information
- Licensing authority: FCC
- Facility ID: 20324
- Class: B
- Power: 600 watts (day); 300 watts (night)
- Transmitter coordinates: 47°57′51.9″N 97°01′47.3″W

Links
- Public license information: Public file; LMS
- Webcast: Listen live (via iHeartRadio)
- Website: 1440kkxl.com

KKXL (1440 AM) is a commercial radio station licensed to Grand Forks, North Dakota, United States, and features a sports format known as "1440 The Fan". Owned by iHeartMedia, Inc., the station serves the Greater Grand Forks region as an affiliate of the Minnesota Vikings, Minnesota Wild, and ESPN Radio, with daytime programming provided from KFXN-FM in Minneapolis–Saint Paul. In addition to a standard analog transmission, KKXL programming is available online via iHeartRadio.

== History ==
=== KILO ===
In 1923, the University of North Dakota started KFJM. This station carried educational as well as commercial programming, which had since 1929 been overseen by Dalton LeMasurier of Grand Forks. As part of this venture, in addition to studios and a transmitter on the university campus, KFJM maintained studios in the First National Bank building downtown.

The University of North Dakota began planning in March 1941 to unwind this arrangement and exit the commercial broadcasting business, which resulted in the award to LeMasurier of a second license. On November 1, 1941, KILO signed on, sharing the 1440 kHz frequency with KFJM. Under the arrangement, KFJM broadcast from 3 to 5 p.m. each day, with KILO broadcasting at other times and frequently assuming those hours in the summer. In a 10-year contract with the university, LeMasurier was responsible for the maintenance of the transmitter shared by the two licenses, as well as other equipment which was owned by the university, and paid $250 a month to UND. The entire KFJM commercial operation transferred to the new license, including staff and advertising contracts; no new construction was involved. A national network affiliation was stated as being in the offing when KILO launched, and this came to fruition on January 1, 1942, when KILO became an affiliate of the Mutual Broadcasting System. Jack Horner, who later worked in Minnesota, worked at commercial KFJM prior to the split and returned to KILO in 1942 to call Grand Forks Chiefs baseball games.

LeMasurier sold KILO in 1948 to the Grand Forks Herald newspaper, which surrendered a construction permit it held to build a station at 1260 kHz. KFJM was authorized to move to 1370 kHz and resume full-time broadcasts in February 1957, leaving KILO alone on 1440; the end of the arrangement also saw KILO move to a new transmitter site. The Herald owned KILO until 1962, when it sold the station to Carl Bloomquist of Eveleth, Minnesota. Bloomquist, through KILO, Inc., paid $125,000.

=== KKXL ===
The Ingstad family acquired KILO from Bloomquist in 1973, paying $300,000 for the station. It was the Tom Ingstad Radio Group's first purchase. Immediately upon the Red River Valley Broadcasting Company assuming control, the call letters were changed to KKXL. Under Ingstad, KKXL added a simulcasting FM, KKXL-FM 105.3 (known as KKDQ between 1975 and 1981), which started on December 23, 1974. A 1982 windstorm collapsed the station's tower on the Fourth of July; the AM returned the next day and the FM a night later.

In 1985, Vaughns, Inc., acquired six Ingstad-owned radio stations, including KKXL-AM-FM, for nearly $9 million; general manager Duane Cariveau was tapped to head the new station group from Grand Forks. Cariveau and other managers of the KKXL stations, organized as Excel Broadcasting, bought the pair from Vaughns three years later. KKXL AM was broadcasting country music by 1994 but flipped to talk and sports in 1996.

In 1997, Excel sold the stations—to the Ingstads, who at the time were also buying two other Grand Forks radio stations, for $2.75 million. That year, the stations were off air for months as the result of another tower collapse and the flooding of the Red River. Upon returning to the air, the station aired an adult standards format from Westwood One. In a 10-station transaction involving stations in the Grand Forks market and in the state of Washington in 1999, Clear Channel acquired KKXL-AM-FM; the stations together fetched $19.71 million.

In 2002, KKXL, which had returned to a talk format, became a sports talk outlet using KFAN programming.
