= Heritage station =

In commercial radio, a heritage station is an AM radio station that has broadcast a specific format for a sustained period, since its beginning; usually since the 1930s or 1940s, in some cases the 1920s. Also, the call letters will have remained the same for most of the station's life.

The "heritage station" term is sometimes used to describe some FM radio stations that have broadcast a specific format for a sustained time, usually since the 1970s or 1980s or earlier. The term is often used to describe Top 40 (CHR) FM stations that have retained the same format and branding for decades.

Heritage stations are usually recognized by the listening public as the dominant (or only) AM station broadcasting said format in each market. Heritage stations keep their call letters and/or brands intact for decades.

In most cases, there is only one heritage AM station per market. However, there may be more, in the case of multiple stations who have been competing for years. Some examples of major market heritage AM stations include KOA Denver, WJR Detroit, KDKA Pittsburgh, WOI and WHO Des Moines, WBZ Boston, WSB Atlanta, WGN and WLS in Chicago, and KMOX St. Louis.

Some examples of major market heritage FM stations include WQHT, WHTZ and WLTW in New York City, KLOS, KIIS, KOST, and KROQ-FM in Los Angeles, WBBM-FM, WGCI-FM and WCKL in Chicago, KRBE in Houston, WSB-FM in Atlanta, WIL-FM in St. Louis, and KQRS and KDWB in Minneapolis. In the UK, heritage radio stations include Clyde 1 in Glasgow, Pulse 1 in West Yorkshire, Radio City in Liverpool, and Capital Radio in London.

However, there are many more heritage stations across the US in cities big and small.

Often, these smaller daytimer stations are the true heritage stations, as they were once the only local voice in many communities for decades; true pioneers despite having to sign off at sunset—many still have their original call letters. Today, the FCC has given new life to many formerly daytime only AM channels, by allowing nighttime power at greatly reduced levels. This allows many stations to broadcast 24/7, often with astonishing nighttime coverage. There is a great variety of programming on AM radio for the listener to discover. Also see PSRA and PSSA.
