= Leighton Media =

U.S. radio broadcasting company

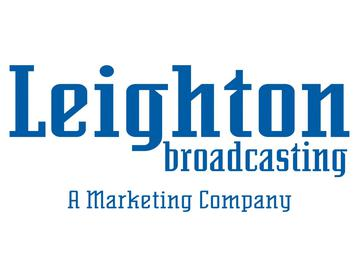
- Type: Employee-owned corporation
- Industry: Radio
- Founded: 1963
- Headquarters: St. Cloud, Minnesota
- Products: Radio, Television, Digital Marketing
- Number of employees: about 200
- Website: leighton.media

Leighton Media, previously Leighton Broadcasting, is a media and marketing company based in St. Cloud, Minnesota that owns radio stations in seven communities in Minnesota and North Dakota.

== Stations owned ==
Call sign	Frequency	Format	Branding
St. Cloud, Minnesota
KCLD-FM	104.7 FM	Top 40 (CHR)	104.7 KCLD
KCML	99.9 FM	Adult Contemporary	More FM
KNSI	1450 AM; 99.3 FM	News/Talk	1450 & 99.3 KNSI
KZPK	98.9 FM	Country	Wild Country 99
K277BS	103.3 FM	Classic rock (Rebroadcasts KZPK-HD3)	Z-Rock 103-3
Detroit Lakes, Minnesota
KBOT	104.1 FM	Adult Contemporary	Wave 104.1
KRCQ	102.3 FM	Country	Real Country 102
KDLM	1340 AM; 93.1 FM	Classic Hits	Classic Hits KDLM
Cable TV	channel 3	Local information	TV3
Grand Forks, North Dakota
KGFK	1590 AM; 95.7 FM; 97.5 FM	classic rock	Rock 95
KNOX	1310 AM; 107.9 FM; 103.3 FM	News/Talk	1310 & 107.9 & 103.3 KNOX
KYCK	97.1 FM	Country	97 KYCK
KZGF	94.7 FM	Top 40 (CHR)	Z94.7
KZLT-FM	104.3 FM	Adult Contemporary	104.3 Cities FM
Perham, Minnesota
KPRW	99.5 FM	Hot Adult Contemporary	The Lakes 99.5
Fergus Falls, Minnesota
KZCR	103.3 FM	Adult hits	Z103.3
KJJK-FM	96.5 FM	Country	KJ Country 96.5 FM
KJJK	1020 AM; 97.7 FM	Top 40	Channel 97-7
KBRF	1250 AM	News/Talk	KBRF News Talk
Winona, Minnesota
KHWK	1380 AM; 101.5 FM	Country	Real Country
KGSL	95.3 FM	Hot adult contemporary	KG-95.3
KWNO	1230 AM; 98.7 FM	News/Talk	KWNO-AM 1230 & 98.7
KWMN	99.3 FM	Sports	The Fan Winona
KRIV-FM	101.1 FM	Classic hits	101.1 The River
Alexandria, Minnesota
KXRZ	99.3 FM	Hot Adult Contemporary/Adult Top 40	Z99
KXRA-FM	92.3 FM	Classic Rock	KX92
KXRA	1490 AM; 100.3 FM; 105.7 FM	News/Talk	KXRA
