= Channel 14 low-power TV stations in the United States =

The following low-power television stations broadcast on digital or analog channel 14 in the United States:

- K14AG-D in Circle, etc., Montana
- K14AL-D in Ely, Nevada
- K14AR-D in Glasgow, Montana
- K14AT-D in Ridgecrest, California
- K14BF-D in Wenatchee, Washington
- K14GW-D in Corvallis, Oregon
- K14HC-D in Prescott, Arizona
- K14HG-D in Kingman, Arizona
- K14HT-D in Walla Walla, etc., Washington
- K14HX-D in Lakehead, California
- K14IC-D in Burley, Idaho
- K14IJ-D in Leadore, Idaho
- K14IO-D in Pierre, South Dakota
- K14IU-D in Frenchtown, etc., Montana
- K14JS-D in Cortez, etc., Colorado
- K14JY-D in Walker Lake, Nevada
- K14JZ-D in Peetz, Colorado
- K14KD-D in Frost, Minnesota
- K14KE-D in St. James, Minnesota
- K14KK-D in Flagstaff, Arizona
- K14KL-D in Pleasant Valley, Colorado
- K14LB-D in Idalia, Colorado
- K14LF-D in Willmar, Minnesota
- K14LP-D in Cottage Grove, Oregon
- K14LT-D in Polson, Montana
- K14LW-D in Myton, Utah
- K14LZ-D in Alexandria, Minnesota
- K14MC-D in Lava Hot Springs, Idaho
- K14MI-D in Niobrara, Nebraska
- K14MQ-D in Coos Bay, Oregon
- K14MU-D in Weatherford, Oklahoma
- K14NA-D in Globe & Miami, Arizona
- K14ND-D in Overton, Nevada
- K14NF-D in Jacks Cabin, Colorado
- K14NI-D in Ferndale, Montana
- K14NJ-D in Hot Springs, Montana
- K14NM-D in Anton & Southwest Washington County, Colorado
- K14NR-D in Tyler, Texas
- K14NU-D in Beowawe, Nevada
- K14NY-D in Sayre, Oklahoma
- K14OA-D in Preston, Idaho
- K14OB-D in Eureka, Nevada
- K14OV-D in Snowmass Village, Colorado
- K14PA-D in Rural Juab County, Utah
- K14PF-D in Peoa/Oakley, Utah
- K14PH-D in Baudette, Minnesota
- K14PX-D in Paxico, Kansas
- K14QC-D in Mexican Hat, Utah
- K14QG-D in Alamogordo, New Mexico
- K14QH-D in Butte Falls, Oregon
- K14QP-D in Woodward, etc., Oklahoma
- K14QS-D in Wanship, Utah
- K14QT-D in Texarkana, Texas
- K14QU-D in Grand Junction, Colorado
- K14QV-D in Childress, Texas
- K14QX-D in Hatch, Utah
- K14QY-D in Rural Sevier County, Utah
- K14QZ-D in Mount Pleasant, Utah
- K14RA-D in Teasdale/Torrey, Utah
- K14RB-D in St. Paul, Minnesota
- K14RC-D in Richfield, etc., Utah
- K14RD-D in Koosharem, Utah
- K14RE-D in Panguitch, Utah
- K14RF-D in Cody, Wyoming
- K14RG-D in Circleville, Utah
- K14RH-D in Henrieville, Utah
- K14RI-D in Nephi, Utah
- K14RJ-D in Mayfield, Utah
- K14RK-D in Phoenix, Arizona
- K14RL-D in Samak, Utah
- K14RM-D in Laketown, etc., Utah
- K14RN-D in Scipio, Utah
- K14RO-D in St. George, etc., Utah
- K14RP-D in Leamington, Utah
- K14RT-D in Fruitland, Utah
- K14RU-D in Spring Glen, Utah
- K14RV-D in Forsyth, Montana
- K14RW-D in Grants Pass, Oregon
- K14RX-D in Ashland, Montana
- K14RY-D in Malad & surrounding area, Idaho
- K14SA-D in Wray, Colorado
- K14SB-D in Terrace Lakes, Idaho
- K14SC-D in Ashland, Oregon
- K14SD-D in South Lake Tahoe, California
- K14SE-D in McDermitt, Nevada
- K14SF-D in Brewster, etc., Washington
- K14TF-D in Opelousas, Louisiana
- K14TG-D in Monterey, California
- K14TH-D in Williams, Oregon
- K14TK-D in Santa Maria, California
- KAOE-LD in Santa Fe, New Mexico
- KAOM-LD in Sweetwater, Texas
- KAUO-LD in Amarillo, Texas
- KBND-LP in Bend, Oregon
- KBNK-LD in Fresno, California
- KDTS-LD in San Francisco, California
- KGCE-LD in Garden City, Kansas
- KIBN-LD in Lufkin, Texas
- KINV-LD in Billings, Montana
- KJCS-LD in Colorado Springs, Colorado
- KLAF-LD in Lafayette, Louisiana
- KLNL-LD in College Station, Texas
- KMMC-LD in San Francisco, California, uses KDTS-LD's spectrum
- KMMW-LD in Stockton, California
- KNBX-CD in Las Vegas, Nevada
- KNRC-LD in Sparks, Nevada
- KOCY-LD in Oklahoma City, Oklahoma
- KPBN-LD in Baton Rouge, Louisiana
- KPHS-LD in Lovelock, Nevada
- KQPS-LD in Hot Springs, Arkansas
- KQTA-LD in San Francisco, California, uses KDTS-LD's spectrum
- KQUP-LD in Spokane, Washington
- KSAO-LD in Sacramento, California
- KSNV in Las Vegas, Nevada
- KSVT-LD in Twin Falls, Idaho
- KUDF-LP in Tucson, Arizona
- KUKC-LD in Kansas City, Missouri
- KULX-CD in Ogden, Utah
- KVIQ-LD in Eureka, California
- KVQT-LD in Houston, Texas
- KWTC-LD in Kerrville, Texas
- KXBF-LD in Bakersfield, California
- KXLK-CD in Austin, Texas, an ATSC 3.0 station.
- KZDN-LD in Denver, Colorado
- W14CO-D in Clarks Summit, etc., Pennsylvania
- W14CX-D in Knoxville, Tennessee
- W14DA-D in Harpswell, Maine
- W14DK-D in Dagsboro, Delaware
- W14DY-D in Onancock, Virginia
- W14EE-D in Algood, Tennessee
- W14EM-D in Marquette, Michigan
- W14EQ-D in Tupelo, Mississippi
- W14EU-D in Tallahassee, Florida
- WCMN-LD in St. Cloud-Sartell, Minnesota
- WECX-LD in Eau Claire, Wisconsin
- WJKP-LD in Corning, New York
- WLZH-LD in Baltimore, Maryland
- WMDO-CD in Washington, D.C.
- WNLO-CD in Norfolk, Virginia, an ATSC 3.0 station.
- WPDS-LD in Largo, etc., Florida
- WSCG-LD in Beaufort, etc., South Carolina
- WSJP-LD in Aquadilla, Puerto Rico
- WSKC-CD in Atlanta, Georgia
- WTBZ-LD in Gainesville, Florida
- WTME-LD in Bruce, Mississippi
- WVQS-LD in Isabel Segunda, Puerto Rico
- WWTD-LD in Washington, D.C.
- WXIV-LD in Myrtle Beach, South Carolina
- WXSL-LD in St. Elmo, Illinois

The following low-power stations, which are no longer licensed, formerly broadcast on analog channel 14:

- K14IL in Pinedale, etc., Wyoming
- K14JL in Fairbanks, Alaska
- K14JT in Twentynine Palms, California
- K14KO in Portales, New Mexico
- K14LD in Muskogee, Oklahoma
- K14LO in Lordsburg, New Mexico
- K14MN in Fortuna, California
- K14OL-D in Granite Falls, Minnesota
- KAZV-LP in Modesto, California
- KBBA-LD in Cedar Falls, Iowa
- KLKS-LP in Breezy Point, Minnesota
- KMCW-LP in Medford, Oregon
- KNTA-LP in New Braunfels, Texas
- KODT-LP in Salt Creek, Oregon
- KOIB-LD in Columbia, Missouri
- KRHP-LD in The Dalles, Oregon
- KUJH-LP in Lawrence, Kansas
- KVCJ-LP in Incline Village, Nevada
- KWYM-LP in Laramie, Wyoming
- KXPX-LP in Corpus Christi, Texas
- KZDE-LD in Fort Collins, Colorado
- W14CK in Newport, Vermont
- W14DJ-D in Myrtle Beach, South Carolina
- WAGC-LD in Atlanta, Georgia
- WAZH-CD in Harrisonburg, Virginia
- WBDI-LD in Springfield, Illinois
- WDLF-LD in Peoria, Illinois
- WIED-LD in Greenville, North Carolina
- WIIW-LP in Nashville, Tennessee
- WNWE-LD in Lincoln, Nebraska
- WPDZ-LD in Buxton, North Carolina
- WSTQ-LP in Syracuse, New York
- WTPH-LP in Fort Myers, Florida
- WTSD-LP in Wilmington, Delaware
- WWEA-LD in Wausau, Wisconsin
