= Channel 14 =

Channel 14 or TV14 may refer to:

== Canada ==
Television stations that broadcast on digital channel 14 (UHF frequencies covering 470-476 MHz):

- CIII-DT in Ottawa, Ontario
- CITS-DT in London, Ontario

Television stations that operate on virtual channel 14:

- CITS-DT in London, Ontario
- CJMT-DT in Ottawa, Ontario

== Other countries ==
- CCTV-14, a Chinese television channel
- Vos TV (Canal 14), a Nicaraguan cable TV channel
- Paraguay TV, a government-owned Paraguayan TV station
- Canal Catorce (Channel 14), a Mexican public broadcaster
- Channel 14 (Israel)

== Other uses ==
- TV-14, a rating for TV parental guidelines

== See also ==
- Channel 14 TV stations in Mexico
- Channel 14 branded TV stations in the United States
- Channel 14 digital TV stations in the United States
- Channel 14 low-power TV stations in the United States
- Channel 14 virtual TV stations in the United States
