= Channel 14 digital TV stations in the United States =

The following television stations broadcast on digital channel 14 in the United States:

- K14AG-D in Circle, etc., Montana
- K14AL-D in Ely, Nevada
- K14AR-D in Glasgow, Montana
- K14AT-D in Ridgecrest, California, on virtual channel 52, which rebroadcasts KVEA
- K14BF-D in Wenatchee, Washington
- K14GW-D in Corvallis, Oregon
- K14HC-D in Prescott, Arizona, on virtual channel 45, which rebroadcasts KUTP
- K14HG-D in Kingman, Arizona
- K14HT-D in Walla Walla, etc., Washington
- K14HX-D in Lakehead, California
- K14IC-D in Burley, Idaho
- K14IJ-D in Leadore, Idaho
- K14IO-D in Pierre, South Dakota
- K14IU-D in Frenchtown, etc., Montana
- K14JS-D in Cortez, etc., Colorado
- K14JY-D in Walker Lake, Nevada
- K14JZ-D in Peetz, Colorado, on virtual channel 51, which rebroadcasts K16NJ-D
- K14KD-D in Frost, Minnesota
- K14KE-D in St. James, Minnesota
- K14KK-D in Flagstaff, Arizona, on virtual channel 8, which rebroadcasts KAET
- K14KL-D in Pleasant Valley, Colorado, on virtual channel 31, which rebroadcasts KDVR
- K14LB-D in Idalia, Colorado, on virtual channel 31, which rebroadcasts KDVR
- K14LF-D in Willmar, Minnesota, on virtual channel 23, which rebroadcasts WUCW
- K14LP-D in Cottage Grove, Oregon
- K14LT-D in Polson, Montana
- K14LW-D in Myton, Utah
- K14LZ-D in Alexandria, Minnesota, on virtual channel 23, which rebroadcasts WUCW
- K14MC-D in Lava Hot Springs, Idaho
- K14MI-D in Niobrara, Nebraska
- K14MQ-D in Coos Bay, Oregon
- K14MU-D in Weatherford, Oklahoma
- K14NA-D in Globe & Miami, Arizona
- K14ND-D in Overton, Nevada
- K14NF-D in Jacks Cabin, Colorado, on virtual channel 4, which rebroadcasts K04DH-D
- K14NI-D in Ferndale, Montana
- K14NJ-D in Hot Springs, Montana
- K14NM-D in Anton & Southwest Washington County, Colorado, on virtual channel 9, which rebroadcasts KUSA
- K14NR-D in Tyler, Texas
- K14NU-D in Beowawe, Nevada
- K14NY-D in Sayre, Oklahoma
- K14OA-D in Preston, Idaho, on virtual channel 9, which rebroadcasts KUEN
- K14OB-D in Eureka, Nevada
- K14OV-D in Snowmass Village, Colorado
- K14PA-D in Rural Juab County, Utah
- K14PF-D in Peoa/Oakley, Utah
- K14PH-D in Baudette, Minnesota
- K14PX-D in Paxico, Kansas
- K14QC-D in Mexican Hat, Utah
- K14QG-D in Alamogordo, New Mexico
- K14QH-D in Butte Falls, Oregon
- K14QP-D in Woodward, etc., Oklahoma
- K14QS-D in Wanship, Utah
- K14QT-D in Texarkana, Texas
- K14QU-D in Grand Junction, Colorado
- K14QV-D in Childress, Texas
- K14QX-D in Hatch, Utah
- K14QY-D in Rural Sevier County, Utah
- K14QZ-D in Mount Pleasant, Utah, on virtual channel 11, which rebroadcasts KBYU-TV
- K14RA-D in Teasdale/Torrey, Utah
- K14RB-D in St. Paul, Minnesota, on virtual channel 14
- K14RC-D in Richfield, etc., Utah, on virtual channel 2, which rebroadcasts KUTV
- K14RD-D in Koosharem, Utah
- K14RE-D in Panguitch, Utah
- K14RF-D in Cody, Wyoming
- K14RG-D in Circleville, Utah
- K14RH-D in Henrieville, Utah
- K14RI-D in Nephi, Utah
- K14RJ-D in Mayfield, Utah
- K14RK-D in Phoenix, Arizona
- K14RL-D in Samak, Utah, on virtual channel 2, which rebroadcasts KUTV
- K14RM-D in Laketown, etc., Utah, on virtual channel 2, which rebroadcasts KUTV
- K14RN-D in Scipio, Utah
- K14RO-D in St. George, etc., Utah, on virtual channel 11, which rebroadcasts KBYU-TV
- K14RP-D in Leamington, Utah
- K14RT-D in Fruitland, Utah
- K14RU-D in Spring Glen, Utah
- K14RV-D in Forsyth, Montana
- K14RW-D in Grants Pass, Oregon
- K14RX-D in Ashland, Montana
- K14RY-D in Malad & surrounding, Idaho
- K14SA-D in Wray, Colorado, on virtual channel 2, which rebroadcasts K16NJ-D
- K14SB-D in Terrace Lakes, Idaho
- K14SC-D in Ashland, Oregon
- K14SD-D in South Lake Tahoe, California
- K14SE-D in McDermitt, Nevada
- K14SF-D in Brewster, etc., Washington
- K14SH-D in Marshfield, Missouri
- K14TF-D in Opelousas, Louisiana
- K14TG-D in Monterey, California
- K14TH-D in Williams, Oregon
- K14TK-D in Santa Maria, California
- KAOE-LD in Santa Fe, New Mexico
- KAOM-LD in Sweetwater, Texas
- KAPP in Yakima, Washington
- KAUO-LD in Amarillo, Texas
- KBND-LP in Bend, Oregon
- KBNK-LD in Fresno, California
- KCSG in Cedar City, Utah, on virtual channel 8
- KDTS-LD in San Francisco, California, on virtual channel 52
- KERA-TV in Dallas, Texas, on virtual channel 13
- KFXB-TV in Dubuque, Iowa
- KGCE-LD in Garden City, Kansas
- KGWC-TV in Casper, Wyoming
- KIBN-LD in Lufkin, Texas
- KINV-LD in Billings, Montana
- KJCS-LD in Colorado Springs, Colorado
- KLAF-LD in Lafayette, Louisiana
- KLNL-LD in College Station, Texas
- KMCY in Minot, North Dakota
- KMMC-LD in San Francisco, California, uses KDTS-LD's spectrum, on virtual channel 30
- KMMW-LD in Stockton, California, on virtual channel 33, which rebroadcasts KCSO-LD
- KNBX-CD in Las Vegas, Nevada
- KNLC in St. Louis, Missouri, on virtual channel 24
- KNRC-LD in Sparks, Nevada
- KOCW in Hoisington, Kansas
- KOCY-LD in Oklahoma City, Oklahoma
- KPBN-LD in Baton Rouge, Louisiana
- KPHS-LD in Lovelock, Nevada
- KQPS-LD in Hot Springs, Arkansas
- KQTA-LD in San Francisco, California, uses KDTS-LD's spectrum, on virtual channel 15
- KQUP-LD in Spokane, Washington
- KSAO-LD in Sacramento, California, on virtual channel 49
- KSNV in Las Vegas, Nevada
- KSVT-LD in Twin Falls, Idaho
- KTGM in Tamuning, Guam
- KTLM in Rio Grande City, Texas
- KTIV in Sioux City, Iowa
- KTUL in Tulsa, Oklahoma
- KUDF-LP in Tucson, Arizona
- KUKC-LD in Kansas City, Missouri, on virtual channel 20
- KULX-CD in Ogden, Utah, on virtual channel 10, which rebroadcasts KTMW
- KVIQ-LD in Eureka, California
- KVOS-TV in Bellingham, Washington, on virtual channel 12
- KVQT-LD in Houston, Texas, on virtual channel 21
- KWTC-LD in Kerrville, Texas
- KXBF-LD in Bakersfield, California
- KXLK-CD in Austin, Texas, an ATSC 3.0 station
- KXMD-TV in Williston, North Dakota
- KZDN-LD in Denver, Colorado, on virtual channel 16
- W14CO-D in Clarks Summit, etc., Pennsylvania
- W14CX-D in Knoxville, Tennessee
- W14DA-D in Harpswell, Maine
- W14DK-D in Dagsboro, Delaware
- W14DY-D in Onancock, Virginia
- W14EE-D in Algood, Tennessee, on virtual channel 29
- W14EM-D in Marquette, Michigan
- W14EQ-D in Tupelo, Mississippi
- W14EU-D in Tallahassee, Florida
- WAGV in Harlan, Kentucky, uses WLFG's spectrum
- WCMH-TV in Columbus, Ohio, on virtual channel 4
- WCMN-LD in St. Cloud-Sartell, Minnesota
- WDBB in Bessemer, Alabama
- WDBD in Jackson, Mississippi
- WDSI-TV in Chattanooga, Tennessee
- WECX-LD in Eau Claire, Wisconsin
- WFGX in Fort Walton Beach, Florida
- WFOX-TV in Jacksonville, Florida
- WGBA-TV in Green Bay, Wisconsin
- WJKP-LD in Corning, New York
- WLAJ in Lansing, Michigan
- WLZH-LD in Baltimore, Maryland
- WLFG in Grundy, Virginia
- WLNS-TV in Lansing, Michigan, uses WLAJ's spectrum
- WMDO-CD in Washington, D.C.
- WNLO-CD in Norfolk, Virginia, an ATSC 3.0 station
- WNNE in Montpelier, Vermont, uses WPTZ's spectrum
- WOPX-TV in Melbourne, Florida, on virtual channel 56
- WPDS-LD in Largo, etc., Florida, on virtual channel 14
- WPTZ in Plattsburgh, New York
- WRDC in Durham, North Carolina, an ATSC 3.0 station, on virtual channel 28
- WSCG-LD in Beaufort, etc., South Carolina
- WSJP-LD in Aquadilla, Puerto Rico, on virtual channel 18
- WSKC-CD in Atlanta, Georgia, on virtual channel 22
- WSYT in Syracuse, New York
- WTBZ-LD in Gainesville, Florida
- WTIN-TV in Ponce, Puerto Rico, on virtual channel 4
- WTME-LD in Bruce, Mississippi
- WVQS-LD in Isabel Segunda, Puerto Rico, on virtual channel 20, which rebroadcasts WSJN-CD
- WWJS in Hickory, North Carolina
- WWTD-LD in Washington, D.C., on virtual channel 49
- WXIV-LD in Myrtle Beach, South Carolina
- WXSL-LD in St. Elmo, Illinois

The following stations, which are no longer licensed, formerly broadcast on digital channel 14:

- K14OL-D in Granite Falls, Minnesota
- KBBA-LD in Cedar Falls, Iowa
- KOIB-LD in Columbia, Missouri
- KRHP-LD in The Dalles, Oregon
- KZDE-LD in Fort Collins, Colorado
- W14DJ-D in Myrtle Beach, South Carolina
- WAGC-LD in Atlanta, Georgia
- WAZH-CD in Harrisonburg, Virginia
- WBDI-LD in Springfield, Illinois
- WDLF-LD in Peoria, Illinois
- WIED-LD in Greenville, North Carolina
- WMEI in Arecibo, Puerto Rico
- WNWE-LD in Lincoln, Nebraska
- WPDZ-LD in Buxton, North Carolina
- WWEA-LD in Wausau, Wisconsin
