= KUFW =

KUFW may refer to:

- KUFW (FM), a radio station (106.3 FM) licensed to serve Kingsburg, California, United States
- KLXY (FM), a radio station (90.5 FM) licensed to serve Woodlake, California, which held the call sign KUFW from 1981 to 2019
