= KNAI =

KNAI may refer to:

- KNAI (AM), a radio station (860 AM) licensed to serve Phoenix, Arizona, United States
- KVCP, a radio station (88.3 FM) licensed to serve Phoenix, Arizona, which held the call signs KNAI and KNAI-FM from 1987 to 2018
- KMVQ-FM, a radio station (99.7 FM) licensed to serve San Francisco, California, United States, which held the call sign KNAI-FM from 1975 to 1977
