= Tekoa =

Tekoa or variants may refer to:

- Tuqu', Palestinian town, in West Bank that includes the ancient biblical site of Tekoa (Khirbet Teqoa/Tuqu')
- Tekoa (Israeli settlement), in West Bank (est. 1975)
- Tekoa, Washington, United States
  - Tekoa Mountain (Washington), U.S.
- Tekoa Mountain (Massachusetts), U.S.
- Woman of Tekoa, unnamed figure in the Hebrew Bible
- Yosef Tekoah (1925–1991), Israeli diplomat

== See also ==
- Takua (disambiguation)
- Wadi Khureitun, or Nahal Tekoa, a wadi in the Judaean Desert in the West Bank
