= KMVP =

KMVP may refer to:

- KMVP-FM, a radio station (98.7 FM) licensed to serve Phoenix, Arizona, United States
- KNAI (AM), a radio station (860 AM) licensed to serve Phoenix, Arizona, which held the call sign KMVP from 1996 to 2017
