= KXSS =

KXSS may refer to:

- KXSS (AM), a radio station (1390 AM) licensed to Waite Park, Minnesota, United States
- KXSS-FM, a radio station (96.9 FM) licensed to Amarillo, Texas, United States
