= KFUE =

Radio station in Buckeye, Arizona

- Buckeye, Arizona; United States
- Broadcast area: Phoenix West Valley
- Frequency: 106.7 MHz
- Branding: Fuego 106.7

Programming
- Languages: Spanish, English
- Format: Bilingual rhythmic

Ownership
- Owner: Entravision Communications; (Entravision Holdings, LLC)
- Sister stations: KLNZ; KVVA-FM

History
- First air date: 1992 (as KMJK at 106.9)
- Former call signs: KYNI (1991, CP); KMJK (1991–2001); KDVA (2001–2024)
- Former frequencies: 106.9 MHz (1992–2023)
- Call sign meaning: fuego (Spanish), or fire

Technical information
- Licensing authority: FCC
- Facility ID: 2750
- Class: A
- ERP: 6,000 watts
- HAAT: 93 meters (305 ft)
- Transmitter coordinates: 33°27′1″N 112°35′58″W
- Repeater: 107.1 KVVA-FM HD2 (Sun Lakes)

Links
- Public license information: Public file; LMS
- Webcast: Listen live
- Website: KFUE Online

KFUE (106.7 FM, "Fuego 106.7") is a commercial radio station licensed to Buckeye, Arizona. It broadcasts a bilingual rhythmic radio format, serving the western portion of the Phoenix metropolitan area (known as the West Valley). The station is owned by Entravision Communications, with studios near Sky Harbor Airport.

KFUE has an effective radiated power (ERP) of 6,000 watts as a Class A station. The transmitter is off Miller Road in Buckeye, north of Interstate 10.

== History ==
=== Urban AC KMJK ===
The station signed on the air in 1992 at 106.9 MHz. The original call sign was KMJK and it aired an urban adult contemporary radio format. KMJK was constructed as a docket 80-90 construction permit to facilitate minority ownership. The original licensee and architect was Arthur Mobley. KMJK was owned and operated by Mobley Broadcasting Incorporated and also had talk, sports and news segments, aimed at Phoenix's African-American community.

In 1994, the license was transferred by Mobley to Arizona Radio, Inc., an affiliate of Syndicated Communications Venture Partners (Syncom), a minority investment fund based in Silver Spring, Maryland. Despite the ownership change, Mobley maintained operating control. KMJK continued its Urban AC sound.

=== KDVA Romántica, Estrella and Suavecita ===
On December 7, 2000, Entravision acquired both KVVA-FM and KMJK and combined the two into a simulcast for its "Radio Romántica" format. FM 106.9 was assigned the KDVA call letters by the Federal Communications Commission (FCC) on February 1, 2001.

In 2005 KDVA switched to a format branded as "Super Estrella" as part of the "Super Estrella" satellite network. In 2011, it changed to the "Radio José" branding while maintaining a similar format. In 2018, the "La Suavecita" branding and format were put in place on both KDVA and KVVA-FM.

In 2010 and again in 2017, the station filed to move to 106.7 MHz. The latter application was denied in July 2018 because it was contingent on KVVA-FM moving to another transmitter site. That was denied by the FCC in order to license Aguila's KAZV.

On October 30, 2023, KDVA moved from 106.9 FM to 106.7 FM and rebranded as "La Suavecita 106.7/107.1".

=== KFUE Fuego 106.7 ===
Entravision launched the bilingual rhythmic "Fuego" brand in Phoenix on April 15, 2024, becoming "Fuego 106.7" under new KFUE call letters.
