= KBMB =

Radio station in Black Canyon City, Arizona

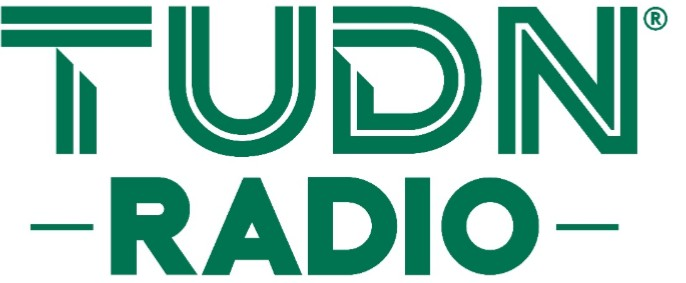
- Black Canyon City, Arizona; United States
- Broadcast area: Phoenix metropolitan area
- Frequency: 710 kHz
- Branding: TUDN Radio Phoenix 710AM

Programming
- Format: Spanish sports
- Affiliations: TUDN Radio

Ownership
- Owner: Entravision Communications; (Entravision Holdings, LLC)
- Sister stations: KFUE, KLNZ, KVVA-FM

History
- First air date: November 23, 1981; 44 years ago
- Last air date: November 27, 2023; 2 years ago
- Former call signs: KUET (1981–2003); KMIA (2003–2010)

Technical information
- Facility ID: 63147
- Class: B
- Power: 22,000 watts day; 3,900 watts night
- Transmitter coordinates: 34°4′50.1″N 112°9′15.6″W

KBMB (710 AM) was a commercial radio station licensed to Black Canyon City, Arizona, and serving the Phoenix metropolitan area. Owned by Entravision Communications, it last broadcast a Spanish-language sports format. Most programming came from the TUDN Radio Network.

KBMB’s transmitter power was 22,000 watts daytime and 3,900 watts nighttime. It used a directional antenna with a six-tower array. The transmitter was on Deep Canyon Trail, near Old Black Canyon Highway in Black Canyon City.

== History ==
=== Early years ===
KUET signed on the air on November 23, 1981. The first station for Black Canyon City, KUET broadcast a full-service radio format. The station, a 500-watt daytimer, was owned by the Black Canyon Broadcasting Company (William Ledbetter and John Gates) and had studios at Metrocenter. With only a 500-watt signal, and required to go off the air at sunset, KUET failed to find an audience in the larger Phoenix radio market. On November 7, 1984, it went silent when Harris Corporation repossessed its transmission equipment.

KUET's license was sold to Statewide Broadcasters, Inc., in 1985. Statewide set about the task of increasing KUET's daytime power to 50,000 watts and adding nighttime service. Statewide's application was put into comparative hearing with a bid from Tucson's KVOI to move from 690 to 700 kHz and increase its power, but KUET won out. However, KUET remained off the air throughout the 1990s. The station was sold in 1997 to the Z-Spanish Media Group.

=== Rebuilding the towers ===
Z-Spanish said KUET's original 351 feet (107 m) towers, on federal land, were inadequate, and the group proposed to erect an array of seven 197 feet (60 m) towers in a move that drew local opposition. Residents gathered signatures to put the construction of the new towers to referendum. While Yavapai County Superior Court ruled that no referendum was necessary in a win for Z-Spanish, the Arizona Court of Appeals overturned the verdict and found that signatures gathered by circulators from outside Yavapai County were valid. In the midst of the fighting, Z-Spanish was absorbed by Entravision Communications.

Ultimately, the 7-tower setup was approved. On January 18, 2002, KUET received program test authority to begin broadcasting for the first time since 1984 as an English-language oldies station. The new KUET also began carrying Arizona State Sun Devils baseball and women's basketball in the fall of 2002 under a three-year deal.

On January 7, 2003, KUET became a Spanish oldies station with new KMIA call letters. The deal to carry ASU sports was cancelled. Sports returned to KMIA in February 2006 when the station became a carrier of the new ESPN Deportes Radio network.

=== Vandalism ===
The station's transmitter was vandalized on March 4, 2006, when someone burned the steel support rods on four of the seven towers with a torch, causing them to crash to the ground. The station returned to the air by the end of March 2006, but at severely reduced power.

In 2007, another tower problem arose when the FCC fined KMIA for failing to maintain the lights on five of the towers.

=== TUDN Sports and closure ===
KMIA became KBMB on July 9, 2010. Those call letters had previously belonged to an Entravision-owned FM outlet in Sacramento that became KHHM two weeks earlier.

In September 2019, with the looming shutdown of the ESPN Deportes Radio network, all Entravision-owned affiliates flipped to Jose, a format featuring norteño and ranchera music. It returned to Spanish-language sports with programming from TUDN Radio as of August 2020.

Entravision surrendered the station's license in November 2023, following the August sale of the land under KBMB's transmitter facility to the owner of the nearby Kay mine deposit. It is not clear exactly when the station left the air. In a December 1, 2023, letter to the FCC Entravision’s legal counsel requested reinstatement of the license. A request for Silent STA was filed the same day, and was granted on December 8, 2023. Entravision again requested the cancellation of the KBMB license on October 31, 2024.

The Federal Communications Commission cancelled the station’s license on November 7, 2024.
