= KCCF =

KCCF may refer to:

- KCCF-LD, a low-power television station (channel 33, virtual 46) licensed to serve Atascadero, California, United States; see List of television stations in California
- KVCP, a radio station (88.3 FM) licensed to serve Phoenix, Arizona, United States, which held the call sign KCCF-FM in 2018
