= KZRV =

Coordinates: 45.767°N 94.135°W

- Sartell, Minnesota; United States
- Broadcast area: St. Cloud, Minnesota
- Frequency: 96.7 MHz
- Branding: 96.7 The River

Programming
- Format: Classic hits

Ownership
- Owner: Townsquare Media; (Townsquare Media Licensee of St. Cloud, Inc.)
- Sister stations: KLZZ, KMXK, WJON, WWJO, KXSS

History
- First air date: 1988 (as KKSR)
- Former call signs: KKSR (1988–2007)
- Call sign meaning: K Z RiVer

Technical information
- Licensing authority: FCC
- Facility ID: 59149
- Class: C2
- ERP: 50,000 watts
- HAAT: 138 m (453 ft)

Links
- Public license information: Public file; LMS
- Webcast: Listen Live
- Website: river967.com

KZRV (96.7 FM, "96-7 The River") is a radio station in St. Cloud, Minnesota licensed to Sartell, Minnesota by the Federal Communications Commission (FCC), airing a classic hits format. The station is owned by Townsquare Media. The station's studios, along with Townsquare's other St. Cloud stations, are located at 640 Lincoln Avenue SE, on St. Cloud's east side.

== History ==
KZRV-FM began its initial broadcasting operations in 1988 under the call sign KKSR, licensed to Sartell, Minnesota. The station was founded by StarCom, Inc., a local company headed by Don Rabbitt, and was originally known for its Adult Contemporary format branded as "Star 96.7". While he launched KKSR, he simultaneously launched WCMN-LP (Channel 13), an independent low-power television station. The two stations were sister operations, sharing a studio facility, provided a hyper-local alternative to the Twin Cities-based media that dominated the region. WCMN was notable for being one of the few low-power TV stations in the country to produce a full nightly local newscast, often featuring the same local news staff that provided updates for Star 96.7.

The partnership with WCMN-TV allowed for cross-promotional "simulcasts" of major local events, such as the Granite City Days parade. Don Rabbitt sold the radio assets of StarCom, including KKSR, to Regent Communications (the predecessor to Townsquare Media) for approximately $8.5 million. Shortly after the sale, the station flipped to a Top 40/CHR format and rebranded as "Kiss 96." In September 2007, the station abandoned pop music for an active rock format. To match the new "Rev 96-7" branding, the call letters were officially changed to KZRV. As part of a massive deal with Cumulus Media, the station’s ownership was transferred to Townsquare Media.

On June 27, 2017, the station underwent a significant format flip at midnight, moving away from its ten-year "Rev 96-7" active rock identity.
