= KMIA =

KMIA may refer to:

- Miami International Airport, in Miami, Florida, United States, its ICAO airport code
- Kruger Mpumalanga International Airport, near Nelspruit, South Africa
- KMIA (AM), a radio station (1210 AM) in Auburn, Washington, United States
- KBMB, a radio station (710 AM) licensed to Black Canyon City, Arizona, United States that held the call sign KMIA from 2003 to 2010
