= KLXY =

KLXY may refer to:

- KLXY (FM), radio station (90.5 FM) in Woodlake, California
- KJAG, a radio station (107.7 FM) in Guthrie, Texas, which held the call sign KLXY from 2017 to 2018
- KARW, a radio station (97.9 FM) in Salinas, California, which held the call sign KLXY from 2016 to 2017
