= Takua =

Takua may refer to:

- Takua people, an ethnic group in Vietnam
  - Takua language, language spoken by Takua people
- Takua, a biblical site near Teqoa, Palestine
  - Tekoa (Israeli settlement)

== See also ==
- Tekoa (disambiguation)
