= KXSS (AM) =

Coordinates: 45°32′31″N 94°15′41″W

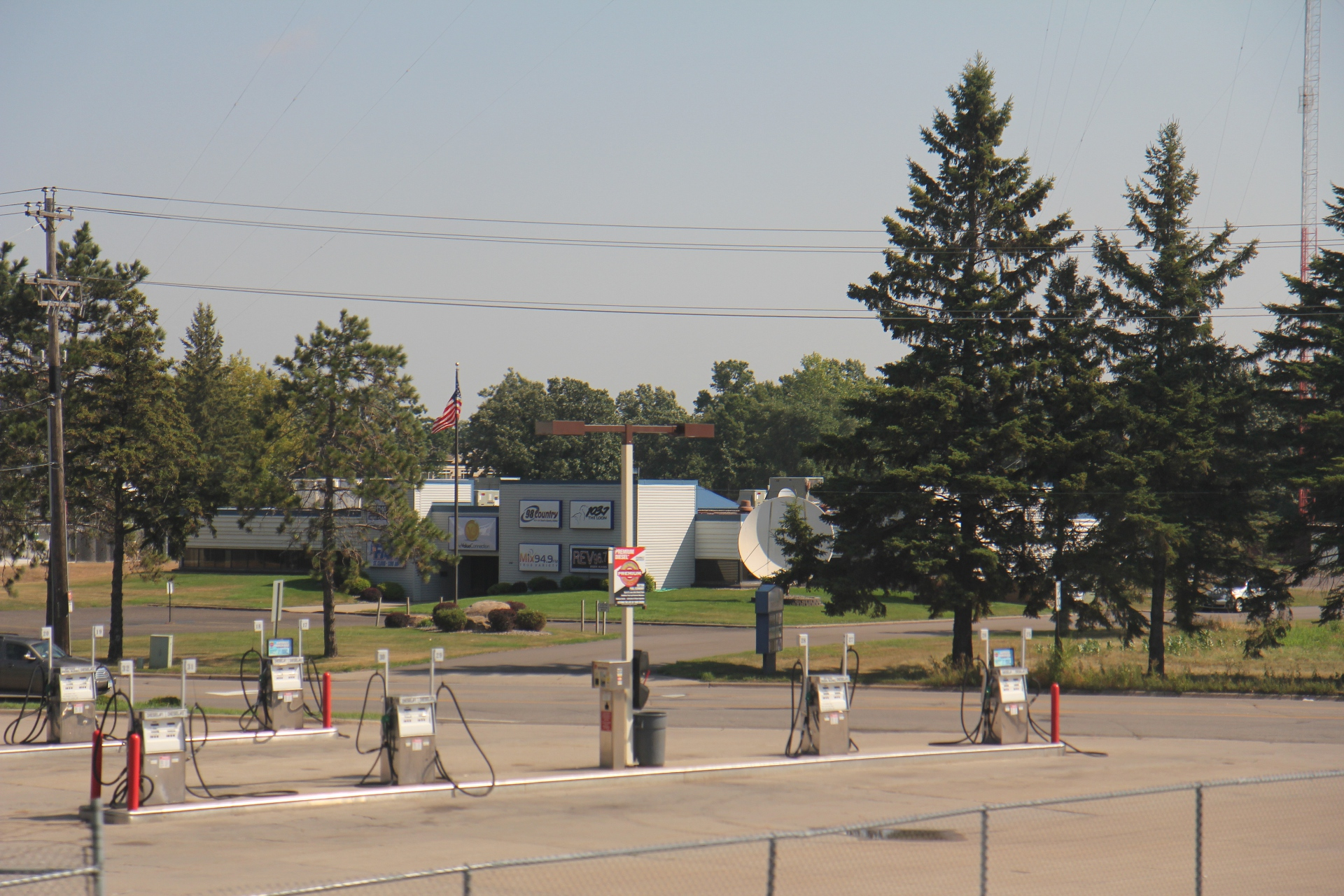
- The studios for WWJO, KLZZ, KMXK, KZRV, KXSS, and WJON, viewed from the Empire Builder
- Waite Park, Minnesota; United States
- Broadcast area: St. Cloud, Minnesota
- Frequency: 1390 kHz
- Branding: 1390 Granite City Sports

Programming
- Format: Sports
- Affiliations: Infinity Sports Network; Fan Radio Network; Minnesota Timberwolves; Minnesota Vikings; Minnesota Wild; St. Cloud Rox; Westwood One Sports

Ownership
- Owner: Townsquare Media; (Townsquare Media Licensee of St. Cloud, Inc.)
- Sister stations: KLZZ, KMXK, KZRV, WWJO, WJON

History
- First air date: October 5, 1981 (44 years ago)
- Former call signs: KKCM (1980–1985); KRAR (1985–1988); KZXQ (1988–1989); KXSS (1989–1996); KSXX (1996–1996)

Technical information
- Licensing authority: FCC
- Facility ID: 60493
- Class: B
- Power: 2,500 watts day 1,000 watts night
- Translator: 93.9 W230DG (Waite Park)

Links
- Public license information: Public file; LMS
- Webcast: Listen Live
- Website: 1390granitecitysports.com

KXSS (1390 kHz) is an AM radio station in Waite Park, Minnesota airing a sports format. The station is owned by Townsquare Media.

The radio station’s transmitter is located in Waite Park, serving the St. Cloud metro area. When it was originally brought online in the early 1980s, the studio for the station was near the transmitter site off Highway 23 on the outskirts of Waite Park. The studios were also used for a once local television station WCMN-LP, 13. The studios are now on the eastern side of St. Cloud, shared with several sister stations.

Along with network programming, the station carries local sports events as well, such as broadcasts during St. Cloud Rox baseball games.

== History ==
KXSS went on the air on October 5, 1981 as KKCM. The station went silent on January 27, 1985 due to the sale of the station. KKCM was later sold to Ken Eidenschink and changed its call letters to KRAR. It then changed to KZXQ. On June 12, 1989, the station changed to its current call letters, KXSS. The station changed again to KSXX on October 11, 1996, and back to KXSS on December 17, 1996. The station aired a pop music format during the 1980s known as Kiss.
