= KVVA-FM =

Radio station in Sun Lakes, Arizona

- Sun Lakes, Arizona; United States
- Broadcast area: Phoenix Metropolitan Area
- Frequency: 107.1 MHz (HD Radio)
- Branding: La Suavecita 107.1

Programming
- Language: Spanish
- Format: Adult hits
- Subchannels: HD2: KFUE simulcast
- Affiliations: Fútbol de Primera

Ownership
- Owner: Entravision Communications; (Entravision Holdings, LLC)
- Sister stations: KFUE; KLNZ

History
- First air date: July 1, 1973 (as KSTM)
- Former call signs: KSTM (1973–1987)

Technical information
- Licensing authority: FCC
- Facility ID: 1331
- Class: C2
- ERP: 2,850 watts
- HAAT: 459 meters (1,506 ft)
- Transmitter coordinates: 33°19′57.3″N 112°3′57″W

Links
- Public license information: Public file; LMS
- Webcast: Listen live
- Website: KVVA-FM Online

KVVA-FM (107.1 MHz, "La Suavecita 107.1") is a commercial radio station licensed to Sun Lakes, Arizona, United States, serving the Phoenix metropolitan area. Owned by Entravision Communications, the station has studios near Sky Harbor Airport.

KVVA-FM has an effective radiated power (ERP) of 2,850 watts as a Class C2 station. The transmitter is located in South Mountain Park.

== History ==
=== KSTM and KVVA-FM ===
The station signed on the air on July 1, 1973. Its call sign was KSTM. It was built by engineer Harold Harkins who also served as its first general manager and it had a variety format. Harkings sold KSTM to Beta Communications in 1980. Under Beta, it broadcast an album rock format known as "The Storm".

Two years after buying KSTM, Beta acquired KIFN (860 AM), Phoenix's heritage Spanish-language station, and relaunched it as KVVA. Five years later, Beta opted to jettison KSTM's rock format for Spanish-language adult contemporary as KVVA-FM 107.1. It was the first Spanish-language FM station in Phoenix since KNNN had exited the format in 1984.

=== Romántica, Estrella, Jose, Suavecita ===
Beta went bankrupt in 1996, and the AM and FM stations were auctioned separately. KVVA-FM was sold to Z-Spanish Radio Network. Four years later, Entravision Communications acquired KVVA-FM and KMJK and combined the two into a simulcast for its "Radio Romántica" format. In 2005, the stations were changed to "Super Estrella," as part of the Super Estrella Network programmed by Edgar Pineda from Los Angeles. In September 2008, the simulcast switched to "Jose FM", a Spanish adult hits format. The "La Suavecita" format was instituted in 2018.

In July 2020, after years of filings involving a nearby FM allotment to Aguila, Entravision was approved to move KVVA-FM's city of license from Apache Junction to Sun Lakes, in order to relocate the transmitter from Apache Junction to South Mountain and become a market-wide signal. Its simulcast partner, KDVA, moved from 106.9 to 106.7 MHz in late October 2023. The transmitter move was completed in June 2024, which included the introduction of a simulcast of 106.7–now KFUE–on KVVA-FM's HD2 subchannel.
