= WWJO =

Coordinates: 45.814°N 94.027°W

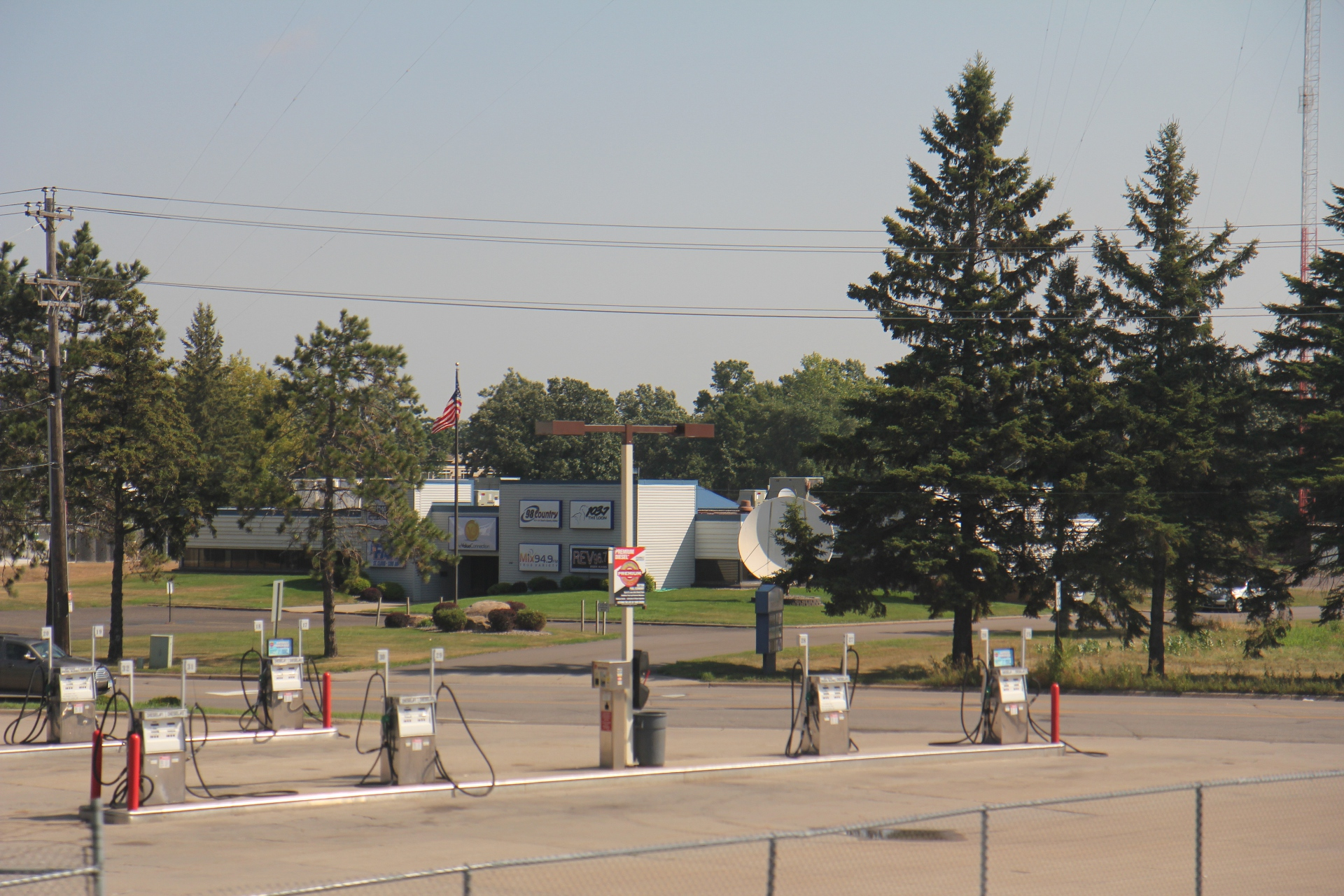
- The studios for WWJO, KLZZ, KMXK, KZRV, KXSS, and WJON, viewed from the Empire Builder
- St. Cloud, Minnesota; United States
- Broadcast area: Central Minnesota
- Frequency: 98.1 MHz
- RDS: PS/RT: Title Artist 98.1 Minnesota's New Country
- Branding: 98-1 Minnesota's New Country

Programming
- Format: Country
- Affiliations: Compass Media Networks

Ownership
- Owner: Townsquare Media; (Townsquare Media Licensee Of St. Cloud, Inc.)
- Sister stations: KLZZ, KMXK, KZRV, WJON, KXSS

History
- First air date: April 19, 1971

Technical information
- Licensing authority: FCC
- Facility ID: 73145
- Class: C
- ERP: 100,000 watts (with beam tilt)
- HAAT: 305 m (1,001 ft)

Links
- Public license information: Public file; LMS
- Webcast: Listen live
- Website: minnesotasnewcountry.com

WWJO (98.1 FM) is a radio station in St. Cloud, Minnesota airing a country music format. The station is owned by Townsquare Media. The station's studios, along with Townsquare's other St. Cloud stations, are located at 640 Lincoln Avenue SE, on St. Cloud's east side.

WWJO-FM began broadcasting on April 19, 1971. The station was established by Andy Hilger, who had previously purchased WJON-AM in 1965. Hilger envisioned the FM signal as a powerful regional voice, and the station initially launched with a 100,000-watt transmitter on a 1,000-foot tower located in northern Benton County. This provides the station with coverage from the Twin Cities to Brainerd.

In its early years, the station adopted a country music format, which would become its long-standing identity under the branding "98 Country." Hilger utilized the station to provide extensive coverage of local events and sports that were previously limited to the lower-power AM dial.

The station remained under the ownership of the WJON Broadcasting Company for nearly three decades. In May 1999, Andy Hilger sold the station along with sister properties WJON-AM and KMXK-FM to Regent Communications (now Townsquare Media) for approximately $5 million.
