= KMYX-FM =

- Arvin, California; United States
- Broadcast area: Bakersfield, California
- Frequency: 92.5 MHz
- Branding: La Campesina 92.5 FM

Programming
- Format: Regional Mexican

Ownership
- Owner: Chavez Radio Group
- Sister stations: KBDS

Technical information
- Licensing authority: FCC
- Facility ID: 21209
- Class: A
- ERP: 620 watts
- HAAT: 312.0 meters (1,023.6 ft)
- Transmitter coordinates: 35°11′41.0″N 118°42′19.4″W

Links
- Public license information: Public file; LMS
- Webcast: Listen live
- Website: campesina.net/bakersfield

KMYX-FM (92.5 FM, La Campesina 92.5 FM) is a radio station broadcasting a Regional Mexican format. Licensed to Arvin, California, United States, it serves the Bakersfield area. The station is currently owned by Chavez Radio Group.
