= The Secret History of Eurovision =

- Genre: Music documentary
- Written by: Stephen Oliver & Phil Craig
- Directed by: Stephen Oliver
- Narrated by: Linda Cropper (SBS), Steven Mackintosh (More4), Marty Whelan (RTÉ)
- Country of origin: Australia
- Original language: English
- No. of series: 1
- No. of episodes: 2

Production
- Executive producers: Phil Craig, Trevor Graham, Andrew Ogilvie, Andrea Quesnelle
- Producers: Andrew Ogilvie, Andrea Quesnelle
- Cinematography: Jim Frater
- Editor: Andrew Arestides
- Running time: 90 minutes, 2 × 1 hour, 83 minutes
- Production companies: Brook Lapping Productions & Electric Pictures

Original release
- Network: More4, SBS, RTÉ, WDR, DR, NRK, NTR, SVT, VRT, YLE
- Release: 30 April 2011 (YLE); 1 May 2011 (DR & NRK); 5 May 2011 (RTÉ & NTR); 6 May 2011 (SBS); 7 May 2011 (More4); 9 May 2011 (WDR); 10 May 2011 (NOS & VRT); 13 May 2011 (SVT)

Related
- Eurovision Song Contest

The Secret History of Eurovision is a television documentary produced by Brook Lapping Productions and Electric Pictures in association with Screen Australia, charting the history of the Eurovision Song Contest and its impact on European political and social structure. The show features archive footage from past Eurovision competitions and archive news features, as well as recent interviews.

The show is distributed by BBC Worldwide either as a stand-alone, 90-minute documentary (without breaks) or as two one-hour documentaries. It was pitched at the Sheffield Doc/Fest's MeetMarket in 2008. The DVD of the show is distributed by Electric Pictures. Various TV networks in Europe broadcast the programme prior to the Eurovision Song Contest 2011 in Düsseldorf, Germany on 14 May 2011. In the UK, the show was televised on More4 on Saturday, 7 May. In Australia the 2 × 1 hour show was broadcast on SBS on Friday 6 May, and 13 May.

Contributors included Bob Geldof, Svante Stockselius, Dana, Dana International, Terry Wogan, Paul Jordan (Dr Eurovision), Ruslana, Bucks Fizz, Lena Meyer-Landrut, Johnny Logan, Paddy O'Connell, Lordi, Niamh Kavanagh, Dave Benton, John Kennedy O'Connor, Bill Martin, Mart Laar, Alexis Petridis, Bill Whelan and Nicole.
