= KIEM-TV =

Television station in Eureka, California

- Eureka, California; United States
- Channels: Digital: 3 (VHF); Virtual: 3
- Branding: NBC 3; Redwood News

Programming
- Affiliations: 3.1: NBC; 3.2: Ion

Ownership
- Owner: Marquee Broadcasting; (Marquee Broadcasting West, Inc.)
- Sister stations: KVIQ-LD

History
- First air date: October 25, 1953
- Former channel numbers: Analog: 3 (VHF, 1953–2009); Digital: 16 (UHF, 2004–2009)
- Former affiliations: CBS (1953–1985); DuMont (secondary, 1953–1955); NBC (secondary, 1953–1958); ABC (secondary, 1953–1989)
- Call sign meaning: "Keep Informed Every Minute"

Technical information
- Licensing authority: FCC
- Facility ID: 53382
- ERP: 12.5 kW
- HAAT: 485 m (1,591 ft)
- Transmitter coordinates: 40°43′49″N 123°57′11″W

Links
- Public license information: Public file; LMS
- Website: redwoodnews.tv

KIEM-TV (channel 3) is a television station in Eureka, California, United States, affiliated with NBC. It is owned by Marquee Broadcasting alongside low-power CBS affiliate KVIQ-LD (channel 14). The two stations share studios on South Broadway in Spruce Point near the southwestern corner of Eureka; KIEM-TV's transmitter is located along Kneeland Road southeast of the city.

== History ==
KIEM-TV signed on the air as Eureka's first television station on October 25, 1953. The station was started by William B. Smullin and his company, California Oregon Broadcasting, Inc., who also started (and still owns) KOBI-TV in Medford, Oregon. The station call sign KIEM-TV was a counterpart to the company's AM radio station, KIEM — which stood for "Keep Informed Every Minute". The FM part of a broadcast trio was KRED. (Soon after KIEM-TV began broadcasting, the first stereo broadcast in Humboldt County used the AM station to broadcast the right channel and the FM station to broadcast the left channel.)

KIEM-TV was initially affiliated with CBS; however, as the only station in the market in its early years, it also provided programs from NBC, ABC, and DuMont (which folded in 1955). After KVIQ signed on in 1958 and became the NBC affiliate, both stations offered some ABC programming on a part-time basis. Full-time NBC coverage was provided by San Francisco's then-NBC affiliate KRON on area cable systems.

As NBC became the number 1 rated network in the mid-1980s, both KVIQ and KIEM increased the amount of programming aired from their networks. At the same time, there were proposals for KREQ-TV (channel 23, now KAEF-TV) to launch as a new station in the Eureka market. In 1985, KIEM signed an exclusive affiliation contract with NBC, and KVIQ affiliated with CBS, while both carried ABC programming on a secondary basis until KREQ signed on. KIEM's NBC affiliation commenced on December 30. Another commercial station, KREQ-TV, signed on the air in 1987 as a Fox affiliate. When channel 23 became an ABC affiliate two years later, both KVIQ and KIEM ceased offering ABC programs on a part-time basis.

Pollack/Belz Broadcasting, who purchased the station in 1996, agreed to sell KIEM-TV to Lost Coast Broadcasting on March 13, 2017. Lost Coast, in turn, assigned its right to acquire the station to Redwood Television Partners, a subsidiary of Brian Brady's Northwest Broadcasting, on August 15. Northwest would at that time sell its existing Eureka station, KVIQ. The sale was completed on December 1.

In February 2019, Reuters reported that Apollo Global Management had agreed to acquire the entirety of Brady's television portfolio, which it intends to merge with Cox Media Group (which Apollo is acquiring at the same time), once the purchases are approved by the FCC. The following month, Apollo confirmed through filings with the FCC that its newly formed broadcasting group, Terrier Media, would acquire Northwest Broadcasting, with Brian Brady holding an unspecified minority interest in Terrier. Then in June 2019, it was announced that Terrier Media would instead operate as Cox Media Group, as Apollo had reached a deal to also acquire Cox's radio and advertising businesses. The transaction was completed on December 17.

On March 29, 2022, Cox Media Group announced it would sell KIEM-TV, KVIQ-LD and 16 other stations to Imagicomm Communications, an affiliate of the parent company of the INSP cable channel, for $488 million; the sale was completed on August 1.

On January 16, 2025, it was announced that Marquee Broadcasting would purchase KIEM-TV and KVIQ-LD from Imagicomm (Imagicomm Eureka, LLC) after the company announced it would sell 12 of its stations. The transaction was completed on May 1.

== Sign-off ==
As of November 2013, KIEM signed off every Sunday morning at 1 a.m., and Monday morning at 12:35 a.m., and resumes broadcast at 5 a.m. During sign-off and sign-on, KIEM broadcast a classic sequence, which includes the old blue "3" logo with the NBC peacock logo and the station ID, which is licensed to the city. These were shown before and after the test pattern with SMPTE color bars and the News Channel 3 logo with the current gold "3" and NBC peacock logo with the station ID. This was its current digital ID as KIEM-DT, with the call letters used until the US Digital Transition in 2009 and its slogan as "The Spirit of the North Coast" on the bottom of the pattern. KIEM did not play the national anthem at sign-off or sign-on.

As of April 2020, they are now 24/7, running infomercials and similar programming during overnight hours on weekends.

== News operation ==
KIEM produces a total of 13 1/2 hours of local news each week, with 2 1/2 hours each weekday and one hour on Saturdays and Sundays. Following an hour-long newscast at 6 a.m., the station provides brief news updates during the Today Show. KIEM is currently the only station within the Eureka market to provide newscasts on weekend evenings, as competitors KAEF and KBVU only broadcast weekday newscasts. In addition, the weeknight newscasts are simulcast on KVIQ-LD while the morning and weekend newscasts are only seen on KIEM. KIEM may also provide breaking news coverage for floods or other emergency coverage when warranted.

In 2017, KIEM introduced a major update to their graphics with HD capabilities.

In early 2022, John Kennedy O'Connor joined the station as the lead news anchor. By summer 2025, Ross Rowley had replaced O'Connor as lead news anchor.

=== Notable former on-air staff ===
- Marc Brown – (1984)

== Technical information ==
=== Subchannels ===
The station's signal is multiplexed:

Subchannels of KIEM-TV
Channel	Res.	Short name	Programming
3.1	1080i	KIEM-HD	NBC
3.2	480i	ION	Ion (4:3)

=== Analog-to-digital conversion ===
KIEM-TV shut down its analog signal, over VHF channel 3, on June 12, 2009, the official date on which full-power television stations in the United States transitioned from analog to digital broadcasts under federal mandate. The station's digital signal relocated from its pre-transition UHF channel 16 to VHF channel 3 for post-transition operations.

=== Translators ===
- K07GJ-D Hoopa
- K02OD-D Shelter Cove

== Satellite availability ==
The Eureka television market, one of the smallest in the country, was the only TV market in California not available on Dish Network until June 3, 2010, at which time it became available. Since November 2, 2011, KIEM has also been available on DirecTV.
