= KBHH =

Radio station in Kerman, California, USA

- Kerman, California; United States
- Broadcast area: Fresno metropolitan area
- Frequency: 95.3 MHz
- Branding: La Campesina 95.3

Programming
- Format: Regional Mexican

Ownership
- Owner: Chavez Radio Group
- Sister stations: KUFW

History
- First air date: June 18, 2001

Technical information
- Licensing authority: FCC
- Facility ID: 82085
- Class: A
- ERP: 6,000 watts
- HAAT: 100 meters (330 ft)
- Transmitter coordinates: 36°21′21″N 120°27′41″W

Links
- Public license information: Public file; LMS
- Webcast: Listen live
- Website: forge953.com

KBHH (95.3 FM, "La Campesina 95.3 FM") is a commercial radio station licensed to Kerman, California, United States, and serving the Fresno metropolitan area of Central California. The station's broadcast license is held by the Chavez Radio Group, a subsidiary of the United Farm Workers. KBHH airs a regional Mexican format.

KBHH's transmitter is southwest of Fresno, in Cantua Creek, California.

== History ==
=== Launch (1996–2007) ===
In May 1996, Farmworker Educational Radio Network, Inc., was among the applicants to the Federal Communications Commission (FCC) for a construction permit for a new radio station in Kernan. After a settlement among the applicants was reached in January 1998, the FCC granted the permit on April 16, 1998, with a scheduled expiration date of April 16, 2001. The new station was assigned call letters KBHH on July 17, 1998.

The construction and testing were completed in April 2001. The station was granted its broadcast license on June 18, 2001.

=== Periods of silence (2008–2014) ===
On November 14, 2008, the station's signal went dark in response to the late-2000s recession. On December 4, 2008, the station applied to the FCC for special temporary authority (STA) to remain silent, asserting that it was "unable to operate profitably in the current economic climate". The station reported that it resumed broadcasting on November 12, 2009. This is just one day short of the one year of continuous silence that would have left the station's broadcast license subject to automatic forfeiture and cancellation.

Four days later, on November 16, 2009, KBHH again fell silent. Citing the same conditions in its December 7, 2009, request to remain off the air, the station was granted authorization to remain silent on March 10, 2010, with a scheduled expiration date of September 7, 2010. The station reported to the FCC it resumed operations "at licensed parameters" on November 10, 2010, again just two days before the one-year maximum. Two days later, on November 12, 2010, the station once again went off the air. Again citing the inability to operate profitably in a December 2, 2010, FCC filing, the station was granted authority to remain silent on September 29, 2011, with a firm expiration date of November 12, 2011.

=== Moving the transmitter ===
In March 2011, with the station still off the air, KBHH management applied to the FCC to relocate its broadcast transmitter southwest of Fresno to the top of a hill near Cantua Creek. This move would improve signal coverage in the Fresno area without increasing power output.

To accommodate the move, KBHH also asked the FCC to relocate under-construction KAAX in Avenal, California, from its originally permitted 95.1 MHz to 106.9 MHz to prevent interference due to short-spacing of the two tower sites. The FCC approved the plan and issued a new construction permit to make these changes on October 17, 2011, with a scheduled expiration of October 17, 2014.

=== Regional Mexican era (2014–2018) ===
Michael Nowakowski, the vice-president of the "Communications Fund of the Cesar Chavez Foundation" led the coalition to get KBHH back on the air in the Central Valley. Alongside Bill Barquin, chief operation officer, both helped relaunch the station in October 2014, branded as "La Campesina 95.3 FM." The station was part of the Radio Campesina Network. ("Campesina" is a Spanish word meaning "peasant" or "farmworker".)

Anthony Chavez, president of Farmworker Educational Radio Network, is the youngest son of American farm worker, labor leader, and civil rights activist César Chávez. KBHH is one of about a dozen Radio Campesina stations in California, Arizona, Nevada and Washington serving farmworkers.

=== Rhythmic era (2019–2025) ===
Previous Logo

On June 9, 2019, KBHH flipped to rhythmic contemporary hits, branded as "Forge 95.3". The programs are presented in English, and the playlist features current-based pop music in English and Spanish. The station has opened a request line, where listeners can make music suggestions.

KBHH had introduced several personalities under the new format. The format change was due to Farmworker Educational acquiring KVPW from the Educational Media Foundation two months later, with the "La Campesina" affiliation moving there after that sale's closure. This made KBHH the second station under Farmworker Educational's portfolio that aired a format other than Regional Mexican, along with KBDS in the San Joaquin Valley.

=== Regional Mexican (2025-) ===
On January 1, 2025, KBHH flipped back to Regional Mexican and the La Campesina 95.3 branding.
