= KBDS =

Radio station in Taft–Bakersfield, California

- Taft, California; United States
- Broadcast area: Bakersfield metropolitan area
- Frequency: 103.9 MHz
- Branding: Fire 103.9

Programming
- Format: Urban contemporary
- Affiliations: Compass Media Networks

Ownership
- Owner: Farmworker Educational Radio; (Chavez Radio Group)
- Operator: SheMogul Media
- Sister stations: KMYX-FM

History
- First air date: 1986
- Former call signs: KTLM (1985–1990); KMYX-FM (1990–2000)
- Call sign meaning: "Bakersfield's Dance Station" (former format)

Technical information
- Licensing authority: FCC
- Facility ID: 456
- Class: A
- ERP: 6,000 watts
- HAAT: 100 meters (330 ft)
- Transmitter coordinates: 35°07′04″N 119°27′33″W

Links
- Public license information: Public file; LMS
- Webcast: Listen live
- Website: fire1039.com

KBDS (103.9 FM) is a radio station licensed to Taft, California, United States. It is owned by Farmworker Educational Radio (through licensee Chavez Radio Group), which itself is owned by the Cesar Chavez Foundation. The station is operated by SheMogul Media, which also owns KVPM. KBDS airs an urban contemporary and hip-hop format.

The studios are in southwest Bakersfield, and its transmitter is in Taft.

== History ==
=== Adult standards ===
This station was granted its original construction permit from the Federal Communications Commission on January 18, 1985. The new station was assigned the call letters KTLM by the FCC on December 3, 1985. During that time, the station featured an adult standards and big band format, playing Swing Era music from the 1930s and 1940s.

In March 1988, Louise E. Mann's Mann Broadcasting Company reached an agreement to transfer the permit for this station to The Great Southwest Broadcasting Company. The deal was approved by the FCC on April 27, 1988, and the transaction was consummated on September 13, 1988.

=== AC and country ===
KTLM received its broadcast license from the FCC on August 22, 1989. However, in July 1989 Bakersfield Radio Partners L.P. reached an agreement to acquire this station's permit and license. The deal was approved by the FCC on November 1, 1989, and the transaction was consummated on December 19, 1989. The new owners had the FCC change the station's call sign to KMYX-FM on January 8, 1990. By that point, the station was broadcasting a "Lite Music" format featuring adult contemporary music of the 1970s and 1980s.

In July 1993, Bakersfield Radio Partners reached an agreement to sell this station to Adelman Communications, Inc. The deal was approved by the FCC on September 2, 1993, and the transaction was consummated on October 1, 1993. The format switched once again to country, with the moniker "Thunder Country".

=== Radio Campesina ===
In June 1994, Adelman Communications, Inc., reached an agreement to sell this station to Radio Campesina Bakersfield, Inc. The deal was approved by the FCC on July 13, 1994, and the transaction was consummated on August 4, 1994. The station was assigned the KBDS call letters by the FCC on March 2, 2000. Radio Campesina Bakersfield would later be acquired by Farmworker Educational Radio.

Logo as Play 103.9, used from 2004 until silence in 2008

Prior to its flip to rhythmic contemporary in November 2004, KBDS' previous format was Regional Mexican. During its four-year run "Play 103.9" did well, despite competition from rhythmic rival KISV ("Hot 94.1"), who they decided to take on after KKXX-FM flipped formats three months earlier in August 2004. Indeed, when KBDS went silent in November 2008, they were experiencing their highest 12+ Arbitron ratings to date.

Logo as 103.9 The Beat, used from 2016 until rebranding as Forge in 2020

=== Controversy ===
On June 21, 2005, KBDS was sued by contest winner Shannon Castillo, claiming she was misled by the station's promotions to believe she had won a new Hummer H2. In fact, she and another winner were each presented with a remote-control toy model of an H2.

The lawsuit seeking $60,000, the approximate cost of a real Hummer H2, further claims that KBDS ran a week's worth of promos mocking her as a victim of the station's April Fool's Day joke (even though the contest itself was a week long and started in March).

=== Periods of silence ===
On November 14, 2008, citing poor advertising sales and the state of the economy, KBDS let go its entire programming staff and went off the air. The station formally applied to the FCC to remain silent for up to 180 days, due to being "unable to operate profitably in the current economic climate". The FCC accepted the filing on December 11, 2008, but dismissed the request on November 16, 2009.

The station briefly resumed broadcasting in November 2009 to avoid an FCC rule that triggers an automatic forfeiture of a broadcast license when a station is silent for more than one year. However, KBDS fell silent again on November 17, 2009, and applied for new authority to remain silent. The company again reported financial problems, on December 31, 2009. The FCC granted this authority on March 10, 2010, with a scheduled expiration of September 7, 2010.

=== Rhythmic contemporary ===
On February 5, 2016, KBDS returned to the air with a rhythmic contemporary format, branded as "103.9 The Beat". During the time it was on and off the air, it would simulcast its sister station KMYX-FM in order to keep the license active.

Out of all the stations owned by Farmworker Educational, KBDS is one of only two stations not airing its Regional Mexican network. The other one is KBHH in nearby Fresno. KBHH is branded as "Forge", which in turn would be introduced in Bakersfield on January 16, 2020, when KBDS rebranded as "Forge 103.9". With the rebranding, the station also shifted to a Latin-leaning CHR format. Forge is the secondary network offered by Farmworker Educational Radio.

On June 28, 2022, The Baka Boyz, a popular Los Angeles-based radio team, were added to the station for afternoons.

In April 2024, KBDS rebranded as "Fire 103.9".
