= KLNZ =

Radio station in Glendale, Arizona

- Glendale, Arizona; United States
- Broadcast area: Phoenix metropolitan area
- Frequency: 103.5 MHz (HD Radio)
- Branding: La Tricolor 103.5

Programming
- Format: Regional Mexican
- Subchannels: HD2: KVVA-FM Spanish Adult hits simulcast

Ownership
- Owner: Entravision Communications; (Entravision Holdings, LLC)
- Sister stations: KBMB, KFUE, KVVA-FM

History
- First air date: May 18, 1994; 32 years ago (as KTWC)
- Former call signs: KTWX (1993–1993, CP); KCWB (1993–1993, CP); KTWC (1993–1996); KOAZ (1996–1997); KWCY (1997–1999)

Technical information
- Licensing authority: FCC
- Facility ID: 48738
- Class: C
- ERP: 48,000 watts
- HAAT: 740 meters (2,430 ft)
- Transmitter coordinates: 33°35′33″N 112°34′49″W

Links
- Public license information: Public file; LMS
- Webcast: Listen live
- Website: KLNZ Online

KLNZ (103.5 FM, "La Tricolor 103.5") is a commercial radio station serving the Phoenix metropolitan area. It is owned by Entravision Communications and is licensed to the nearby suburb of Glendale. It broadcasts a regional Mexican radio format, primarily from Entravision's California-based "Radio Tricolor" network. (Tricolor refers to the three colors on the Flag of Mexico.) The studios are near Sky Harbor Airport.

KLNZ is a Class C station. It has an effective radiated power (ERP) of 48,000 watts. The transmitter is off North Tower Road in Buckeye among the White Tank Mountains. KLNZ broadcasts using HD Radio technology. Its HD2 digital subchannel rebroadcasts sister station 107.1 KVVA-FM's Spanish Adult Hits format.

== History ==
=== Oldies and Smooth Jazz ===
FM 103.5 signed on the air on May 18, 1994, under the call sign was KTWC ("Twice 103.5"). The station aired an eclectic oldies format with music ranging from the 1950s through the 1980s. The station was owned by Newmountain II Broadcasting Co. of Phoenix. Newmountain tapped MAC America Communications, owners of KESZ and KTVK, to build the facility and sell ad time while Newmountain handled programming.

In 1996, KTWC was purchased outright by MAC America Communications (now renamed Media America). On May 17, the station switched to a Smooth Jazz format as KOAZ ("The Oasis"), and competed against KYOT-FM.

=== Wild Country ===
In 1997, MAC America decided to sell half its interest in the station to Owens Broadcasting, owners of heritage country station KNIX-FM. (Owens Broadcasting was headed by country singer and television host Buck Owens.) On September 2, KOAZ switched to a more-contemporary country format, targeting a younger audience. It called itself "Wild Country" using the call sign KWCY. A large marketing campaign coincided with the change. It publicized the return of popular morning hosts Tim Hattrick and Willy D. Loon, who were at competing country station KMLE for a few years before a brief stint in Chicago.

KWCY was put up for sale in June 1998. Tim and Willy eventually became morning hosts at KNIX.

=== Entravision ===
Z-Spanish Radio Networks bought the station in late 1998. The company placed its Sacramento-based "La Zeta" Regional Mexican format on 103.5 in December. The call letters became KLNZ.

Entravision Communications merged with Z-Spanish a year later. Its Zeta-formatted stations switched their slogan and format to "Radio Tricolor."
