= KLZZ =

Coordinates: 45.501°N 94.242°W

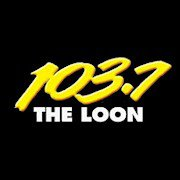
- Waite Park, Minnesota; United States
- Broadcast area: St. Cloud, Minnesota
- Frequency: 103.7 MHz
- Branding: 103-7 The Loon

Programming
- Format: Classic rock
- Affiliations: Compass Media Networks; United Stations Radio Networks

Ownership
- Owner: Townsquare Media; (Townsquare Media Licensee of St. Cloud, Inc.)
- Sister stations: KMXK, KZRV, WJON, WWJO, KXSS

History
- First air date: July 1989; 36 years ago
- Former call signs: KXSS (1989–1992)

Technical information
- Licensing authority: FCC
- Facility ID: 60492
- Class: C3
- ERP: 9,000 watts
- HAAT: 126 m (413 ft)

Links
- Public license information: Public file; LMS
- Webcast: Listen Live
- Website: 1037theloon.com

KLZZ (103.7 FM) is a radio station in Waite Park, Minnesota, airing a classic rock format. The station is owned by Townsquare Media. Waite Park is suburb of St. Cloud, Minnesota.

The 103.7 FM frequency in Waite Park was initially brought to life by Genesis Broadcast Professionals, Inc., led by company president Ronald J. Linder. The station was originally assigned the call sign KXSS-FM (briefly shared with its AM sister station) and operated as "Kiss FM" with a 6,000-watt signal. The station first went on the air in July 1989. Licensed to Waite Park, it originally used the call sign KZZQ (briefly shared with the 1390 AM frequency as a simulcast "Kiss" brand). On December 22, 1989, the station underwent a format and identity overhaul, changing its call letters to KLZZ and adopting the branding "103.7 The Loon" with a classic rock format. In the early 1990s, the station was operated by Alrox Inc., led by Allen Rau. In June 1996, the station was sold as part of a duopoly deal to WJON Broadcasting Company, owned by Andy Hilger. The Hilger era ended in 1999 when the entire group was sold to Regent Communications for approximately $5.2 million. In 2013, the station was included in the massive 12-market divestiture from Cumulus Media to Townsquare Media.
