= John Kennedy O'Connor =

English journalist and radio personality

John Kennedy O'Connor (born in 1964) is a television and radio broadcaster, author, and entertainment commentator. He was born in North London, England, but is a naturalized citizen of the United States. He has written, reported and broadcast for numerous media organizations, as well as written, created and produced media events for a number of international corporations. He is best known for his work within the Eurovision Song Contest as a TV commentator and host. Until 2023, he was the news anchor for NBC and CBS Northern California channels KIEM-TV and KVIQ-LD, before moving to CBS Station KIMA-TV in Washington, as the main anchor.

== Eurovision Song Contest involvement ==
In 2005, Carlton Books published his book The Eurovision Song Contest – The Official History, in conjunction with the European Broadcasting Union, initially produced in English, German, French, Swedish, Dutch and Danish editions, with a separate English publication in Australia. A Finnish version followed in 2007 as did a Russian version in 2009. The book has been updated, expanded and reprinted three times in the UK. The 2010 edition (ISBN 978-1-84732-521-1) was published by Carlton Books, UK, in April 2010. The first edition of the book, published to celebrate the 50th anniversary of the Eurovision Song Contest in Kyiv, Ukraine, was listed in the Top 10 book sales of both Amazon UK and Amazon Germany in May 2005, after being featured during the broadcast during an inset with the contest hosts Maria Efrosinina and Pavlo Shylko.

O'Connor's second Eurovision work, The Eurovision Song Contest: The Official Celebration, was published by Carlton Books in April 2015 (ISBN 978-1780976389). The book was also published in German and Swedish editions.

Since 2012, O'Connor has been the special host of San Marino RTV's Eurovision coverage, presenting the preview shows. In 2013, he was the first spokesperson of the final. On 17 May, O'Connor presented a Eurovision PopMaster on BBC Radio 2, with Ken Bruce and Paddy O'Connell as the two contestants.

In 2014, together with his CreativeLive co-host Jamarie Milkovic, O'Connor provided English commentary for San Marino RTV live from Copenhagen, Denmark, and did so alone in 2015 for the second semifinal. During the Eurovision finals, he also reported for ABC News Australia, ABC Radio National Australia and once more guested on The Ken Bruce Show on BBC Radio 2 and BBC Breakfast on BBC1.

In 2018, O'Connor was one of the judges for 1in360, the talent show to choose San Marino's entry for the Eurovision Song Contest 2018 in Lisbon, Portugal. He again presented, as the spokesperson, the preview shows for San Marino RTV.

In celebration of the contest returning to the UK after an absence of twenty-five years, O'Connor was chosen to be San Marino's voting spokesman for the Eurovision Song Contest 2023 held in Liverpool.

To commemorate the 70th edition of the contest, the EBU and BBC Books (commissioned by their parent imprint Penguin Random House) will be publishing The Legends of Eurovision - The Official 70th Anniversary Celebration (ISBN 978-1785949937) by John Kennedy O'Connor which will be released on April 4, 2026.

== Radio ==
Until the station closed, O'Connor was the American correspondent for digital station Gaydar Radio in the UK, reporting for the Neil and Debbie Breakfast Show, covering live events including the Golden Globe Awards, the Grammy Awards, and the Oscars. He also reported on the gay march held on May 17, 2009, in Moscow, Russia for Sky News. O'Connor has regularly reported for Sky News, Fox News in New York, and ERT in Athens to the UK, and has been a guest on BBC World News and BBC News 24 on TV and "Today" on BBC Radio 4 with John Humphrys, BBC Radio 2's Steve Wright in the Afternoon with host Steve Wright and actress Brooke Shields on Radio. He has also contributed to many other BBC Radio programs, including BBC Radio 5 Live, The Big Toe Show on BBC Radio 7, BBC Radio Scotland, and numerous local BBC Radio stations including guest spots with Nicky Campbell, Judi Spiers, Richard Bacon, Paul Henley, Ted Robbins, Liz Kershaw and featured on the BBC World Service and LBC Radio. UK Channel 4's Jon Snow interviewed O'Connor live from Chicago when news of a scandal relating to the Eurovision Song Contest 1968 broke in May 2008.

In Ireland, he has guested on Key 101 FM Radio with Eurovision winners Dana and Paul Harrington, RTÉ One's Rattlebag, Newstalk Radio and regularly contributes to BBC Radio Ulster.

In Australia, O'Connor has become a regular contributor to various ABC Radio National programs, including the now defunct Perspective program, hosted by producer Sue Clark, providing commentary on British and International Politics as well as popular culture issues. Among other stories, O'Connor reported on the underlying racism of the 2008 US General Election, Gordon Brown's accession as British Prime Minister and the international media coverage of the 2007 Australian federal election, for the program. He has also regularly appeared on ABC's Radio National Breakfast Show with Fran Kelly and many local radio stations in Australia and was the featured guest on an hour-long special on the Triple J ABC station.

== Television ==
In May 2010, O'Connor appeared with Justin Lee Collins on UK Channel Five, advising Collins on his quest to represent a country at the Eurovision Song Contest 2010 in the show Eurovision: A Song For Justin. During the 2010 contest in Oslo, Norway, O'Connor appeared on Aljazeera TV, BBC World News & BBC News Channel with James Dagwell on E24 and after a one-on-one interview, won PopMaster on BBC Radio 2's Ken Bruce show, playing against Paddy O'Connell in a Eurovision spoof of the regular feature, a feat he repeated in 2012 against the BBC Moscow Correspondent Steven Rosenberg. He was also featured on ITV News and BBC Local Radio live from Oslo. In 2011, O'Connor was featured in the documentary The Secret History of Eurovision, shown in More4 in the UK.

Since 2013, O'Connor has been the lead on-screen host for the educational broadcaster CreativeLive, fronting a variety of multi-day live broadcasts from the platforms San Francisco studios.

At the end of 2014, it was announced on Twitter and PBS.org that O'Connor was recording a series for PBS on international architecture and was filming the first episode in Kuala Lumpur and San Francisco with César Pelli as the subject. The six-part series (also featuring Norman Foster and I.M.Pei) aired across the US in the summer of 2015. In August 2015, O'Connor was recording a travel series focussing on India, Nepal and Myanmar.

In February 2020, O'Connor became the host of FacebookLive, broadcast bi-weekly on the social network's blueprint platform. In May 2021, O'Connor became the host of the irregular corporate online newscast The Zero Trust Exchange, produced by ZScaler.

From February 2022, O'Connor became the news anchor for NBC and CBS Northern California channels KIEM-TV and KVIQ-LD. In July 2023, he became the main news anchor for CBS station KIMA-TV in Washington.

== Newspaper ==
O'Connor's written work has been published in the United Kingdom in (among others) the Sunday Express, Daily Mail, Radio Times, Private Eye, Northern Woman and The News of the World. In the United States, he had a syndicated column originating in San Francisco, primarily published in Playlands magazine, a local guide to entertainment and has been interviewed by The Guardian, The New York Times, the San Francisco Chronicle, the San Jose Mercury News, the Houston Chronicle and other American daily papers. He has been profiled in Meetings & Conventions Magazine.

For the 60th anniversary of Eurovision, The Telegraph ran O'Connor's (accurate) predictions for the result in the run-up to the competition. The Star also ran a detailed discussion of the UK's contest chances for 2015. Previously, Oikotimes.com ran a series of seven articles written by O'Connor in January 2011, tracing the history of Germany in the Eurovision Song Contest. Concurrently, the UK Daily Mail, reporting on the BBC's selection of the group Blue to sing for Britain in the Eurovision Song Contest 2011, quoted from an article written by O'Connor for ESCInsight.com.

In 2006, O'Connor was featured in the UK editions of Metro for their "60 Seconds Interview" column. In 2007, O'Connor contributed on camera items for both the Associated Press and Reuters for broadcast, in addition to video spots on AOL's Big Story. Online, he has been interviewed by ESCToday.com about the Eurovision Song Contest.
