= WJON =

News/talk radio station in St. Cloud, Minnesota

Coordinates: 45°33′36″N 94°08′21″W

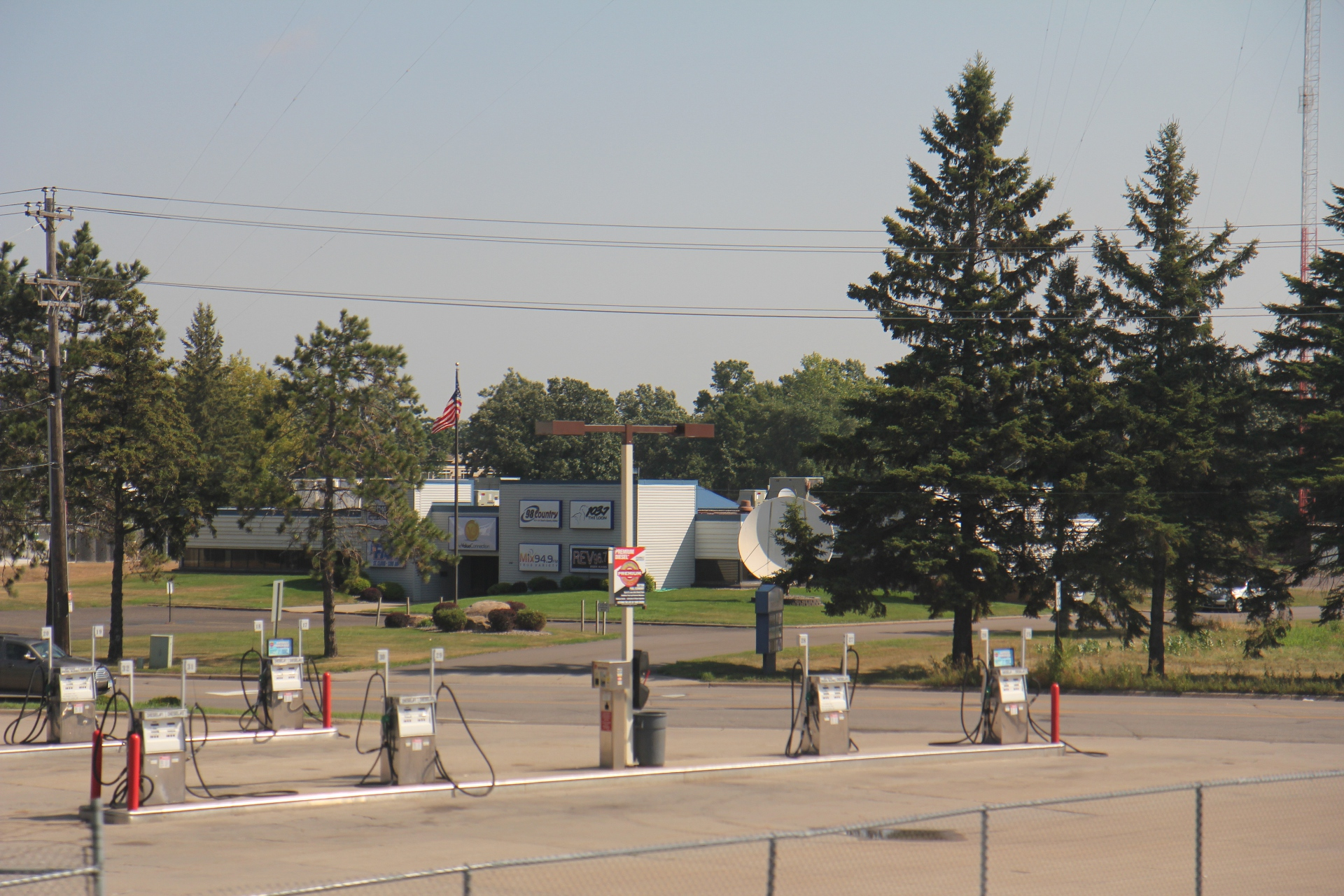
- The studios for WWJO, KLZZ, KMXK, KZRV, KXSS, and WJON, viewed from the Empire Builder
- St. Cloud, Minnesota; United States
- Frequency: 1240 kHz
- Branding: AM 1240 FM 95.3 WJON

Programming
- Format: News/talk
- Affiliations: ABC News Radio; NBC News Radio; Compass Media Networks; Genesis Communications Network; Premiere Networks; USA Radio Network; Westwood One; Minnesota Twins; Minnesota Vikings; Minnesota Wild

Ownership
- Owner: Townsquare Media; (Townsquare Media Licensee of St. Cloud, Inc.)
- Sister stations: KLZZ, KMXK, KZRV, WWJO, KXSS

History
- First air date: September 10, 1950 (75 years ago)

Technical information
- Licensing authority: FCC
- Facility ID: 73144
- Class: C
- Power: 1,000 watts
- Translator: 95.3 W237EU (St. Cloud)

Links
- Public license information: Public file; LMS
- Webcast: Listen Live
- Website: wjon.com

WJON (1240 AM) is a radio station in St. Cloud, Minnesota airing a news/talk format. The station is owned by Townsquare Media. Its main competitors are Leighton Broadcasting's KNSI of St. Cloud and WCCO and KTLK of Minneapolis. The station is also heard on FM translator W237EU 95.3 in St. Cloud.

The station's studios, along with Townsquare's other St. Cloud stations, are located at 640 Lincoln Avenue SE, on St. Cloud's east side.

== History ==
WJON-AM launched its first broadcast on September 10, 1950. The station was established to provide localized news and community-centric programming to the Central Minnesota area. Prior to the establishment of independent student radio at St. Cloud State University, the station served as the primary training ground for local broadcasting students. In 1960, the university's radio guild began producing pre-recorded content in campus studios specifically for airplay on WJON. During the 1952 presidential campaign, the station’s coverage area was the site of a major rally where candidate Dwight D. Eisenhower addressed an estimated 8,000 residents on the steps of the Stearns County Courthouse.

In the late 20th century, the station faced scrutiny regarding its editorial practices. On January 18, 1990, the station was formally admonished by federal regulators for failing to provide a reasonable opportunity for opposing views to respond to six different editorial endorsements made on-air on November 7, 1988. At the time, the station was under the leadership of longtime owner Andy Hilger. The station has been recognized nationally for its commitment to local public service. In 2006, WJON was a recipient of the NAB Crystal Radio Award.
