= KMXK =

Coordinates: 45.398°N 94.421°W

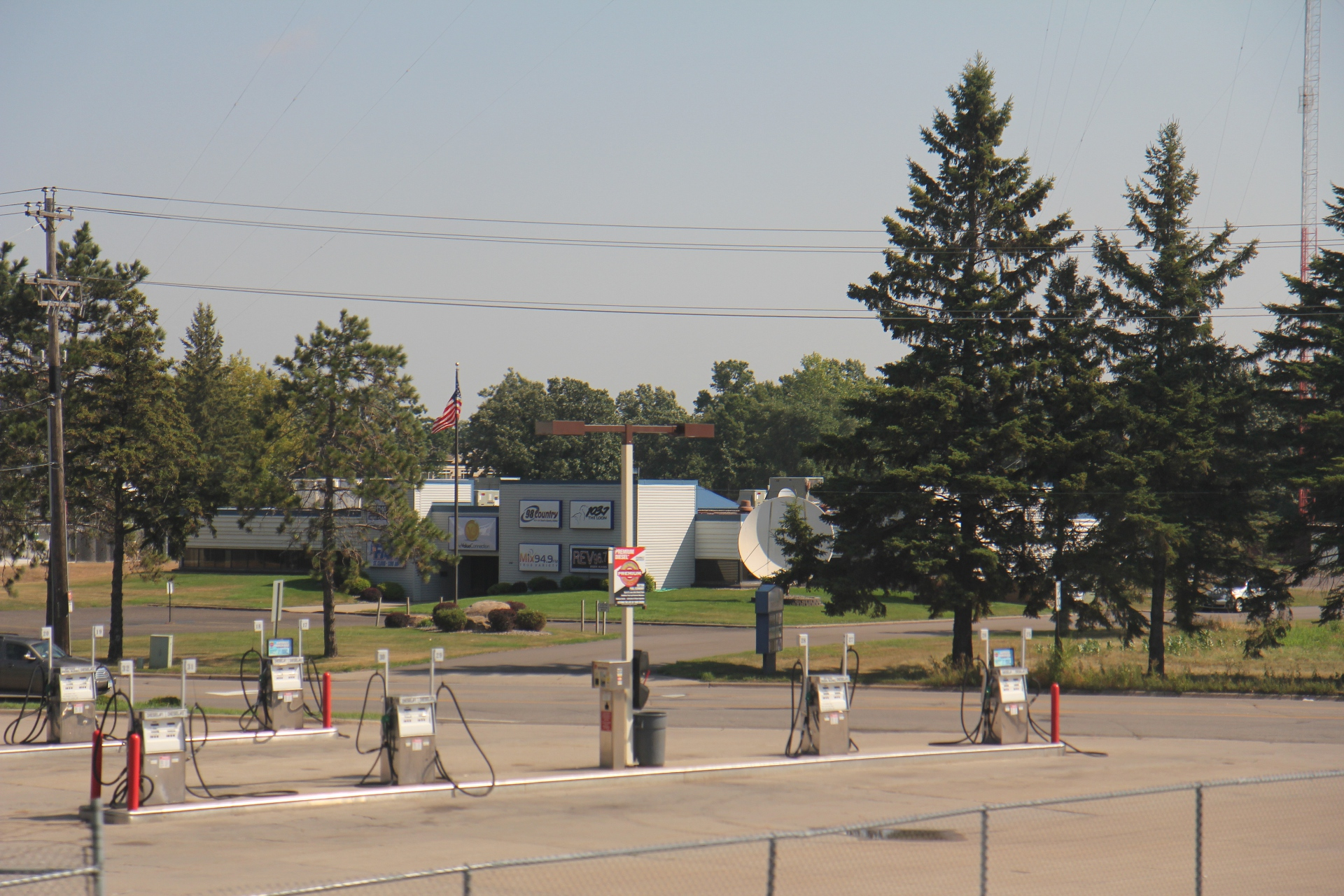
- The studios for WWJO, KLZZ, KMXK, KZRV, KXSS, and WJON, viewed from the Empire Builder
- Cold Spring, Minnesota; United States
- Broadcast area: St. Cloud, Minnesota
- Frequency: 94.9 MHz
- Branding: Mix 94-9

Programming
- Format: Hot adult contemporary
- Affiliations: Compass Media Networks; Premiere Networks; Westwood One

Ownership
- Owner: Townsquare Media; (Townsquare Media Licensee of St. Cloud, Inc.)
- Sister stations: KLZZ, KZRV, WJON, WWJO, KXSS

History
- First air date: 1968
- Former call signs: KLFD (1968–1989)
- Call sign meaning: MX for "Mix"

Technical information
- Licensing authority: FCC
- Facility ID: 73146
- Class: C2
- ERP: 50,000 watts
- HAAT: 150 m (492 ft)

Links
- Public license information: Public file; LMS
- Webcast: Listen Live
- Website: mix949.com

KMXK (94.9 FM) is a commercial radio station in St. Cloud, Minnesota airing a hot adult contemporary format. The station is owned by Townsquare Media. The station's studios, along with Townsquare's other St. Cloud stations, are located at 640 Lincoln Avenue SE, on St. Cloud's east side. The station’s transmitter is located south of Cold Spring, which provides a 50,000-watt signal covering much of Central Minnesota.

== History ==
KMXK-FM originally began broadcasting in 1968 under the call sign KLFD-FM, licensed to Litchfield, Minnesota. The station was founded by the Litchfield Broadcasting Corporation and initially served as an FM counterpart to KLFD-AM.

A pivotal change occurred in the late 1980s when the station sought to expand its reach into the larger St. Cloud market. In December 1990, Litchfield Broadcasting Corp. filed a petition with the Federal Communications Commission (FCC) to change the station's community of license. Effective August 12, 1991, the community of license was officially moved from Litchfield to Cold Spring, Minnesota, allowing the station to better serve the St. Cloud metropolitan area while operating as a Class C2 facility.

During the mid-1990s, the station was acquired by local broadcasting pioneer Andy Hilger. Hilger integrated KMXK into a cluster of stations that included WJON-AM and WWJO-FM. In 1999, Hilger sold KMXK, along with WJON and WWJO, to Regent Communications (now Townsquare Media) for approximately $5 million in cash.
