= Channel 14 TV stations in Mexico =

The following television stations broadcast on digital channel 14 in Mexico:

- XEX-TDT on Altzomoni, State of Mexico
- XHADO-TDT in Adivino, Sonora
- XHALS-TDT in Atil, Sonora
- XHAO-TDT in San Cristóbal de las Casas, Chiapas
- XHAZP-TDT in Arizpe, Sonora
- XHBC-TDT in Mexicali, Baja California
- XHBCA-TDT in Bacanora, Sonora
- XHBCI-TDT in Bacoachi, Sonora
- XHBNI-TDT in Bacadehuachi, Sonora
- XHBNL-TDT in Benjamín Hill, Sonora
- XHBVA-TDT in Baviacora, Sonora
- XHBVE-TDT in Bavispe, Sonora
- XHCOJ-TDT in Ciudad Obregón, Sonora
- XHCTTO-TDT in Toluca, State of Mexico
- XHGDP-TDT in Torreón, Coahuila
- XHHCH-TDT in Huachineras, Sonora
- XHIE-TDT in Acapulco, Guerrero
- XHMDS-TDT in Magdalena de Kino, Sonora
- XHMOR-TDT in Morelia, Michoacán
- XHNCO-TDT in Nácori Chico, Sonora
- XHNGE-TDT in Nácori Grande, Sonora
- XHONV-TDT in Onavas, Sonora
- XHRPS-TDT in Cucurpe, Sonora
- XHSAM-TDT in Sahuayo-Jiquilpan, Michoacán
- XHSCZ-TDT in Santa Cruz, Sonora
- XHSECE-TDT in Querétaro, Querétaro
- XHSIC-TDT in Saric, Sonora
- XHSJR-TDT in San Javier, Sonora
- XHSPE-TDT in San Pedro de la Cueva, Sonora
- XHSPRMT-TDT in Monterrey, Nuevo León
- XHSPRUM-TDT in Uruapan, Michoacán
- XHSSE-TDT in Sasabe, Sonora
- XHSYT-TDT in Sonoita, Sonora
- XHTAO-TDT in Tampico, Tamaulipas
- XHTCE-TDT in Tepache, Sonora
- XHTHI-TDT in Tula, Hidalgo
- XHUES-TDT in Ures, Sonora
- XHVHO-TDT in Villa Hidalgo, Sonora
- XHYES-TDT in Yécora, Sonora
