= KQUP =

Television station in Pullman, Washington

KQUP and KQUP-LD
KQUP: Pullman–Clarkston, Washington; KQUP-LD: Spokane, Washington; Coeur d'Alene, Idaho; United States
- Channels for KQUP: Digital: 24 (UHF); Virtual: 24
- Channels for KQUP-LD: Digital: 14 (UHF); Virtual: 14

Programming
- Affiliations: 24.1/14.1: Daystar; 24.2/14.2: Daystar Español; 24.3/14.3: Daystar Reflections

Ownership
- Owner: Daystar Television Network; (Word of God Fellowship, Inc.)

History
- First air date: KQUP: April 19, 2004; KQUP-LD: September 2002
- Former call signs: KQUP-LD: K47EJ (1994–2002); KQUP-LP (2002–2014)
- Former channel number: KQUP: Analog: 24 (UHF, 2004–2009); KQUP-LD: Analog: 47 (UHF, 2002–2013); Digital: 47 (UHF, 2013–2018)
- Former affiliations: KQUP: UPN (2004–2006); RTN (2006–2009); Dark (2009−2010); KQUP-LD: UPN (2002–2006); RTN (2006–2009)
- Call sign meaning: Station was originally an affiliate of UPN

Technical information
- Licensing authority: FCC
- Facility ID: KQUP: 78921; KQUP-LD: 15635
- Class: KQUP-LD: LD
- ERP: KQUP: 57 kW; KQUP-LD: 15 kW
- HAAT: KQUP: 419 m (1,375 ft); KQUP-LD: 269.3 m (884 ft)
- Transmitter coordinates: KQUP: 47°15′29.6″N 117°5′27.6″W; KQUP-LD: 47°36′2.6″N 117°19′54.7″W

Links
- Public license information: KQUP: Public file; LMS; KQUP-LD: Public file; LMS

KQUP (channel 24) is a religious television station in Pullman, Washington, United States, serving the Spokane television market. The station is owned by the Daystar Television Network, and its main transmitter is located atop Tekoa Mountain. A low-power broadcast translator, KQUP-LD (channel 14), serves as a supplement to KQUP for coverage of Spokane and Coeur d'Alene, Idaho.

Equity Media Holdings built KQUP in 2004 after significant delays. By way of the Spokane translator and cable, in 2002, it replaced KSKN as the UPN affiliate in Spokane until switching to the Retro Television Network (RTN) at the start of 2006. Equity entered bankruptcy reorganization in 2008; the station lost RTN programming in 2009 as the result of a contract dispute with the network and was then sold at auction to Daystar.

== History ==
A construction permit for channel 24, originally assigned the call sign KBGC, was awarded in 1998, but it was not for 5 1/2 years that the station began broadcasting as intended. The construction of KQUP was fraught with difficulties. Equity had hoped to start broadcasting at full power by September 1, 2002, but by that time, only K47EJ, a translator in Coeur d'Alene (the present KQUP-LD), was ready. Consequently, the vast majority of cable and broadcast viewers lost UPN programming. Doug Krile, Equity's corporate public relations director, told the Lewiston Morning Tribune in late September, "This was not the timetable everything was supposed to be operating on." Equipment delays, including the shipping of a transmitter from Italy to the United States, and lease negotiations with Washington State University for use of a tower held up completion of the facility. As an interim solution, KSKN contracted with UPN to air Buffy the Vampire Slayer and WWE SmackDown from January 2003 through the end of the television season. KQUP was added to the main Comcast cable system in Spokane on May 1, 2003, but the Pullman transmitter was relocated to another site and was not activated until April 19, 2004.

KQUP dropped UPN for the Retro Television Network (RTN) on January 1, 2006; Rod Hall, the general manager, told The Spokesman-Review, "In the long term, we just felt that UPN's shows were not ideally suited for the Spokane market." The station also aired Spokane Shock arena football.

On January 4, 2009, a contract conflict between Equity—which had filed the month before for Chapter 11 bankruptcy—and RTN—which had been sold to Luken Communications in 2008—interrupted the programming on many RTN affiliates. As a result, Luken restored a national RTN feed from its headquarters in Chattanooga, Tennessee, with individual customized feeds to non-Equity-owned affiliates to follow on a piecemeal basis. KQUP lost its RTN affiliation immediately.

Because it was granted an original construction permit after the Federal Communications Commission (FCC) finalized the DTV allotment plan on April 21, 1997, the station did not receive a companion channel for a digital television station. Instead, at the end of the digital TV conversion period for full-service stations, KQUP would have been required to turn off its analog signal and turn on its digital signal (called a "flash-cut"). Equity owned a significant number of such stations, and its financial condition meant that it owned a significant number of stations that needed digital conversion; the company warned the FCC that court approval and financing would be required to finance this conversion. The station shut down analog broadcasting from Pullman on June 12, 2009.

At auction on April 16, 2009, Daystar bought KQUP. KQUP-LP began airing Daystar programming that August, but the full-power KQUP digital signal did not sign on until January 2010.

On December 6, 2017, KQUP applied to move its transmitter to the KREM tower on Krell Hill southeast of Spokane. The application was withdrawn on April 2, 2021, after it was determined that the station would not put a city-grade signal over Pullman from the proposed site.

== Subchannels ==
The stations' signals are multiplexed:

Subchannels of KQUP and KQUP-LD
Subchannel		Res.	Short name	Programming
KQUP	KQUP-LD	Res.	Short name	Programming
24.1	14.1	1080i	KQUP-DT	Daystar
24.2	14.2	720p	KQUP-ES	Daystar Español
24.3	14.3	480i	KQUP-SD	Daystar Reflections
