= KVIQ-LD =

Television station in Eureka, California

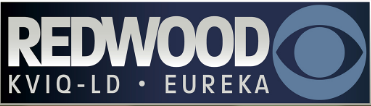
- Eureka, California; United States
- Channels: Digital: 14 (UHF); Virtual: 14
- Branding: KVIQ Redwood CBS

Programming
- Affiliations: 14.1: CBS

Ownership
- Owner: Marquee Broadcasting; (Marquee Broadcasting West, Inc.)
- Sister stations: KIEM-TV

History
- First air date: April 1, 1958
- Former call signs: KJRW: KVIQ-TV (1958–1981); KVIQ (1981–2017); KVIQ-LD: K10FS (until 2017); K14QL-D (2017–2018)
- Former channel numbers: Analog: 6 (VHF, 1958–2008); Digital: 17 (UHF, until 2018); Virtual: 17 (until 2018)
- Former affiliations: NBC (primary 1958–1960, secondary 1961–1985); ABC (primary 1961–1986, secondary 1986−1989)
- Call sign meaning: Was originally co-owned with KVIP-TV in Redding

Technical information
- Licensing authority: FCC
- Facility ID: 42631
- Class: LD
- ERP: 15 kW
- HAAT: 453.8 m (1,489 ft)
- Transmitter coordinates: 40°43′49″N 123°57′11″W

Links
- Public license information: LMS
- Website: www.redwoodnews.tv

KVIQ-LD (channel 14) is a low-power television station in Eureka, California, United States, affiliated with CBS. It is owned by Marquee Broadcasting alongside NBC affiliate KIEM-TV (channel 3). The two stations share studios on South Broadway in Spruce Point near the southwestern corner of Eureka; KVIQ-LD's transmitter is located along Barry Road southeast of the city.

Until 2017, KVIQ operated as a full-power television station on digital channel 17. The full-power signal was sold to comply with FCC regulations, after former owner Northwest Broadcasting acquired another full-power signal, KIEM. Upon the completion of the sale, Northwest transferred the station's intellectual unit into a low-power facility.

== History ==
Carroll R. Hauser obtained a construction permit to build a television station on channel 13 in Eureka on January 17, 1957. The construction permit bore the call letters KHUM-TV. Shasta Telecasting (owner of KVIP-TV in Redding), acquired half-interest in the permit, which was transferred to California Northwest Broadcasting, in 1957. The permittees then successfully requested channel 6 instead of 13 due to the region's rough terrain. The call letters were changed to KVIQ-TV before the station launched on April 1, 1958, from studios on Humboldt Hill Road in Eureka.

In 1960, Carl R. and Leah McConnell acquired all of the shares in California Northwest Broadcasting. A year later, the station switched from a primary NBC affiliation to a primary ABC hookup with some programming from NBC. In 1985, KIEM-TV, the then-CBS affiliate, signed an affiliation agreement with NBC; that station intended to broadcast some CBS shows, but CBS responded by affiliating with KVIQ beginning in January 1986. The McConnells sold the station to Miller Broadcasting in 1986; Ronald W. Miller was already channel 6's general manager.

Miller Broadcasting sold KVIQ to the Ackerley Group in 1998. Ackerley invested quite a bit of money into its news operations. Ackerley merged with corporate giant Clear Channel Communications in 2002. Not long after this merger, the news operation at KVIQ was quickly abandoned. The station was managed by David Silverbrand with its engineering functions performed by James Mixon. Providing operational and sales staff was Sainte Partners II, L.P. Sainte Partners sold the station in 2014.

In December 2013, Sainte Partners II reached a deal to sell KVIQ to Redwood Television Partners, a subsidiary of Frontier Radio Management. The sale was completed on June 30, 2014.

On January 29, 2016, Frontier Radio Management sold Redwood Broadcast Partners to NBI Holdings, LLC, which owned Northwest Broadcasting. The sale was completed on March 24. Northwest Broadcasting agreed to sell KVIQ to Prime Cities Broadcasting on August 16, 2017; the sale was concurrent with Northwest's acquisition of KIEM-TV. The deal was completed on December 1.

Upon completion of the sale, Prime Cities changed channel 17's call letters to KJRW. Northwest Broadcasting retained the KVIQ intellectual unit and CBS affiliation, and moved it to a low-power station it owned, K10FS (which was later K14QL-D), which changed its call letters to KVIQ-LP. on digital channel 14. On April 8, 2018, Prime Cities turned off KJRW's signal because of technical issues. After KJRW's shutdown, Ion programming was moved to KIEM 3.2. KJRW never regularly operated under Prime Cities; after again going off the air to perform transmitter repairs on May 29, 2019, its license expired May 29, 2020, and was canceled on July 23.

In February 2019, Reuters reported that Apollo Global Management had agreed to acquire the entirety of Brian Brady's television portfolio, which it intends to merge with Cox Media Group (which Apollo was acquiring at the same time) and stations spun off from Nexstar Media Group's purchase of Tribune Broadcasting, once the purchases are approved by the FCC. In March 2019 filings with the FCC, Apollo confirmed that its newly-formed broadcasting group, Terrier Media, would acquire Northwest Broadcasting, with Brian Brady holding an unspecified minority interest in Terrier. In June 2019, it was announced that Terrier Media would instead operate as Cox Media Group, as Apollo had reached a deal to also acquire Cox's radio and advertising businesses. The transaction was completed on December 17.

On March 29, 2022, Cox Media Group announced it would sell KVIQ-LD, KIEM-TV and 16 other stations to Imagicomm Communications, an affiliate of the parent company of the INSP cable channel, for $488 million; the sale was completed on August 1.

On January 16, 2025, it was announced that Marquee Broadcasting would purchase KVIQ-LD and KIEM-TV from Imagicomm (Imagicomm Eureka, LLC) after the company announced it would sell 12 of its stations. The transaction was completed on May 1.

== News operation ==
KVIQ had, during the early 1980s, a news operation entitled Newswest. The newscasts were broadcast in the early morning, late night, and evenings, along with two midday newsbreaks. Regular features of these newscasts were "Segment 6" and a weekend segment titled "Open Line," hosted by longtime Eureka broadcaster Saint Clair Adams.

Throughout most of the 1990s, KVIQ presented Channel 6 News weeknights at 6 and 11 p.m.

The former logo for Action News 6.

After being purchased by Ackerley, KVIQ fielded a news operation called Action News 6. These newscasts aired weekdays at 6 a.m. and Noon, and weeknights at 5, 6, 6:30 and 11 p.m. KVIQ also aired weekend newscasts at 6:30 and 11 p.m. Shortly after Clear Channel's acquisition of Ackerley, KVIQ discontinued its news, and began importing the morning and 10 p.m. rebroadcasts of newscasts from then-sister station KFTY in Santa Rosa. After KVIQ was sold in 2005, the KFTY rebroadcasts ceased, and the station replaced the newscasts in its schedule with syndicated programming. The station currently simulcasts the 5 p.m., 6 p.m., and 11 p.m. Redwood News weeknight programs from KIEM-TV; all anchored by John Kennedy O'Connor who joined the station in early 2022.

== Technical information ==
=== Subchannel ===
Subchannel of KVIQ-LD
Channel	Res.	Short name	Programming
14.1	1080i	KVIQ	CBS

KVIQ was the second station in Eureka to broadcast in high definition.

=== Analog-to-digital conversion ===
KVIQ, as a full-power station at the time, shut down its analog signal, over VHF channel 6, on November 28, 2008. The station's digital signal broadcast on its pre-transition UHF channel 17.

== See also ==
- Channel 14 digital TV stations in the United States
- Channel 14 virtual TV stations in the United States
