= KUFW (FM) =

Radio station in Kingsburg, California

Coordinates: 36.447°N 119.620°W

- Kingsburg, California; United States
- Frequency: 106.3 MHz
- Branding: La Campesina 106.3

Programming
- Format: Regional Mexican

Ownership
- Owner: Farmworker Educational Radio; (Chavez Radio Group)
- Sister stations: KBHH

History
- First air date: 1992; 34 years ago
- Former call signs: KJET (1989–1994); KLVS (1994–1997); KLVK (1997–2000); KFYE (2000–2007); KSXE (2007); KVPW (2007–2019)
- Call sign meaning: United Farm Workers (trade union supporting the station)

Technical information
- Licensing authority: FCC
- Facility ID: 18860
- Class: B1
- ERP: 16,000 watts
- HAAT: 128 meters (420 ft)
- Translator: 107.1 K296GH (Porterville)

Links
- Public license information: Public file; LMS
- Webcast: Listen Live
- Website: campesina.com

KUFW (106.3 MHz) is an FM radio station licensed to Kingsburg, California, and serving the San Joaquin Valley, including the cities of Tulare, Visalia, Hanford and Fresno. It is owned by the Cesar Chavez Foundation as a member station of the Regional Mexican "La Campesina" network.

== History ==
=== K-Love ===
The station signed on in 1992, and was originally owned by the Educational Media Foundation (EMF), airing contemporary Christian music from its K-Love network. In 2004, EMF reached an agreement to sell the station to Mapleton Communications for $2 million.

The sale contained a clause requiring the payment of an additional $500,000 fee to EMF if the station is resold within the next three years. In 2006, EMF instead sold the station to ProActive Communications for $2.75 million.

=== Sexy 106.3 ===
After the completion of the sale, KFYE began stunting as Porn Radio, playing sexually-suggestive songs (such as "I'm Too Sexy" and "Why Don't We Do It in the Road?"), and non-sexual songs with moaning sound effects added to them. This led into the station's relaunch as rhythmic adult contemporary Sexy 106.3 on August 3, 2006.

The format initially featured a mix of rhythmic songs, and also included some Latin rhythmic music and rock en español to appeal to the local Hispanic population. On March 30, 2007, after advertising a "goodbye" to KFYE, the station changed its call letters to KSXE to match the new moniker.

=== Power 106.3 ===
On October 30, 2007, the station re-branded as Power 106.3, later changing its calls to KVPW to match the new branding. The following month, MackNificent Broadcasting announced its intent to acquire KVPW. On July 14, 2008, the station switched to rhythmic contemporary, maintaining the Power branding.

In October 2008, MackNificent pulled out of a local marketing agreement intended to lead towards its sale. At the same time, the station dropped its airstaff. Later that month, ProActive filed for chapter 11 bankruptcy protection. ProActive market coordinator Ed Monson accused MackNificent of not paying the station's bills; MackNificent owner Greg Mack denied the claim, stating that he allowed the sale to fall through so that its owner could "work his way out of his own problems" (alluding to ProActive defaulting on its purchases of Spokane's KQQB-FM and KAZZ, which prompted the stations to be taken off the air and returned to prior ownership).

=== Air 1 ===
In early-2009, EMF filed to buy back the station. In June 2009, the station was briefly taken off the air due to a lease dispute with EMF as tower owner. EMF claimed that the owners had defaulted on payments. In February 2010, a trustee filed to take the station's license.

EMF consummated the purchase on June 30, 2010. It was made part of the Air1 network. It played contemporary worship music.

=== La Campesina 106.3 ===
On August 21, 2019, after a deal was on hold for three years, an agreement was finally reached. The Farmworker Educational Radio Network and EMF to swap KUFW Woodlake/Visalia to EMF for KVPW. The deal closed with the companies swapping programming on the two frequencies. KVPW flipped to regional Mexican as La Campesina, while KUFW flipped to K-Love and applied for the call letters KLXY.

On August 29, 2019, the KUFW call sign was transferred to this station. The station plays Regional Mexican music and is also a service to farm workers in surrounding communities.
