= KAZV-LP =

Television station in Modesto, California (1996–2014)

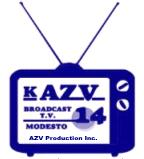

Modesto, California; United States
- Channels: Analog: 14 (UHF)

Ownership
- Owner: AZV Video Production, Inc.; (Frank & Linda Azevedo)

History
- Founded: 1996
- Last air date: September 9, 2014
- Former call signs: K14JP (1995–1996)
- Former affiliations: America One (1996–2014); Urban America Television (c. 2005)
- Call sign meaning: Owner Frank Azevedo

Technical information
- Facility ID: 22244
- Class: TX
- ERP: 36.5 kW
- HAAT: 702 m (2,303 ft)
- Transmitter coordinates: 37°28′48.01″N 121°21′3.65″W

KAZV-LP (channel 14) was a low-power television station in Modesto, California, United States, affiliated with America One. Founded June 22, 1995, the station was owned by AZV Video Production, Inc.

Frank Azevedo, an almond and grape grower, had wanted to own a TV station since 1965 and got his chance with the low-power KAZV-LP. The station went on the air in July or November 1996 and aired mostly classic TV shows and movies. By 1997, it aired about 30 hours a week of local programming, with most of the rest coming from America One. Among the local programs was a newscast, read by Azevedo and mostly consisting of content gleaned from newspapers and press releases. Its viewership was limited by not being on local cable systems.

In 1999, the station received hate mail—a latter denouncing the "intermixture of the races". J. Denise Fontaine, the only Black host, read and ripped up the letter on her show, Our Part of the Valley.

After eight years of trying, KAZV got Comcast to add it to its digital cable lineup in 2005. By this time, it had added Urban America Television programming to its lineup.

On July 12, 2006, the station filed an application to flash-cut to digital operations, at only 500 watts. KAZV-LP's license was canceled by the Federal Communications Commission on September 8, 2014.
