= Tekoa Mountain (Washington) =

Mountain in Washington (state), United States

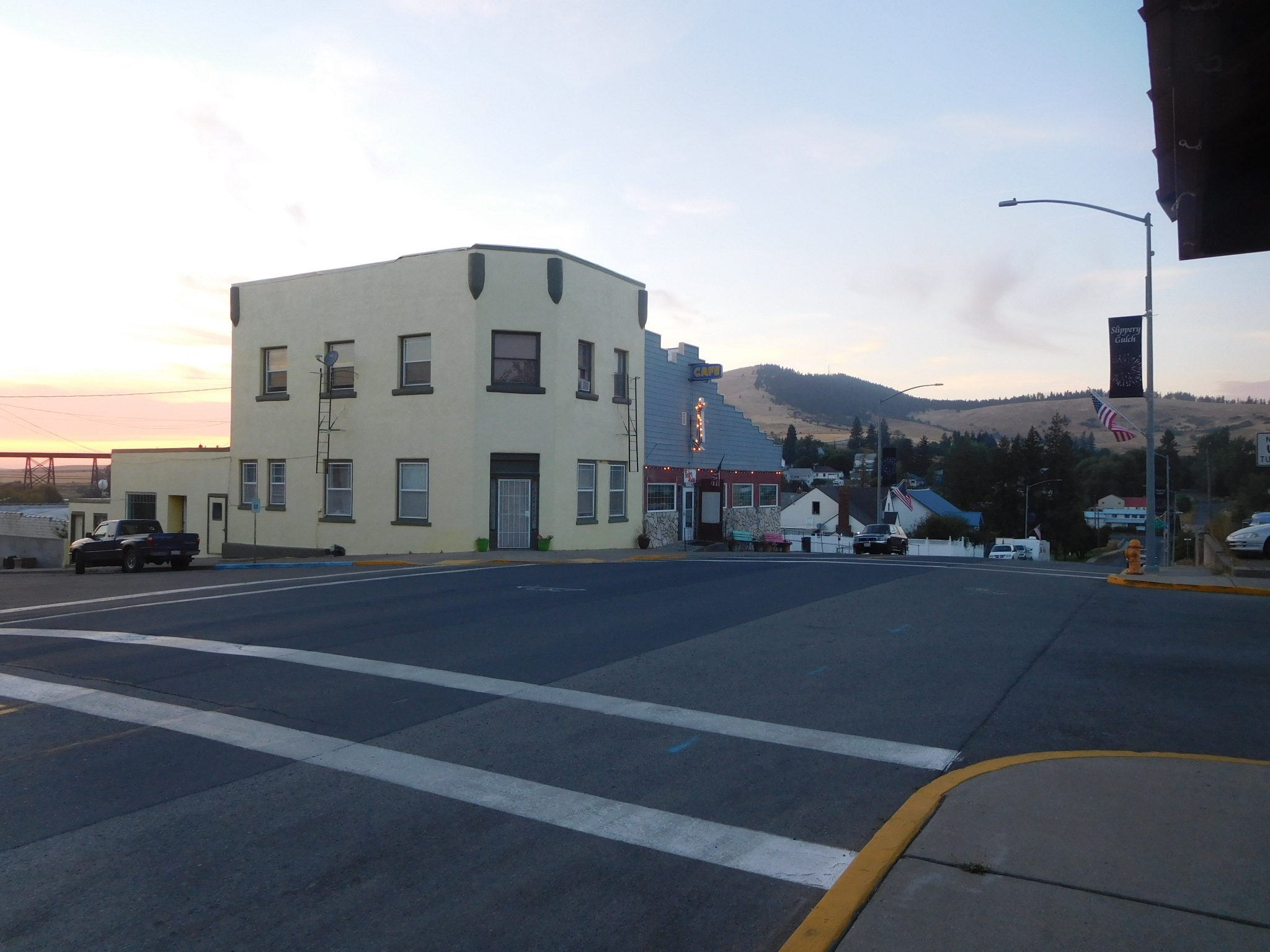
- Tekoa, Washington, with Tekoa Mountain in the background

Highest point
- Elevation: 4,009 ft (1,222 m)
- Coordinates: 47°15′30″N 117°05′23″W

Geography
- Location within Washington (state) Location within the United States
- Location: Whitman County, Washington, US

Tekoa Mountain is a 4,009-foot (1,222 m) summit 2.5 miles (4.0 km) north of Tekoa, just south of the Spokane County–Whitman County line in the U.S. state of Washington. It is the highest point in Whitman County. The peak is used as a launch site by hang gliding enthusiasts except when it is closed for fire danger.
