= KLXY (FM) =

K-Love radio station in Woodlake–Visalia, California

- Woodlake, California; United States
- Broadcast area: Visalia, California, area
- Frequency: 90.5 MHz

Programming
- Format: Christian contemporary
- Network: K-Love

Ownership
- Owner: Educational Media Foundation

History
- First air date: May 1983
- Former call signs: KUFW (1981–2019)
- Call sign meaning: similar to KLVY

Technical information
- Licensing authority: FCC
- Facility ID: 21210
- Class: B
- ERP: 850 watts
- HAAT: 761 meters (2,497 ft)
- Transmitter coordinates: 36°17′09″N 118°50′15″W

Links
- Public license information: Public file; LMS
- Webcast: Listen Live
- Website: klove.com

KLXY (90.5 FM) is an American non-commercial educational radio station licensed to serve the community of Woodlake in Tulare County, California. The station is owned and operated by the Educational Media Foundation, and is an affiliate of the Christian contemporary network K-Love.

As KUFW, KLXY previously broadcast a Regional Mexican music and educational programming format branded as "La Campesina 90.5 FM" to the farmworkers of the Visalia metropolitan area as part of the Radio Campesina Network. ("Campesina" is a Spanish word meaning "peasant" or "farmworker".) Anthony Chavez, president of Farmworker Educational Radio Network, Inc., is the youngest son of American farm worker, labor leader, and civil rights activist César Chávez.

== History ==
Logo as "La Campesina"

In July 1980, the United Farm Workers union, working through a subsidiary named Farmworkers Communications, Inc., applied to the Federal Communications Commission (FCC) for a construction permit for a new broadcast radio station. The FCC granted this permit on August 31, 1981, with a scheduled expiration date of August 31, 1982. The new station was assigned call sign KUFW on November 30, 1981. After multiple extensions, construction and testing were completed in May 1983 and KUFW began broadcasting under program test authority. KUFW became the first radio station in the United States "dedicated to the needs of farmworkers". The station was granted its broadcast license on June 28, 1984.

The station was taken temporarily off the air in mid-April 1990 by a fire that gutted the interior of the broadcast facility and destroyed the station's control room. While repairs were being made, broadcasting resumed from one of the station's remote broadcast vans parked at the site of the fire-ravaged facility.

In August 1995, Farmworkers Communications, Inc., applied with the FCC to transfer the KUFW broadcast license to the National Farm Workers Service Center, Inc. The FCC approved the move on December 13, 1995, and the transaction was formally consummated on December 14, 1995.

On September 2, 2011, lawyers representing radio stations KUFW and KNAI (Phoenix, Arizona) notified the FCC that license holder National Farm Workers Service Center, Inc., had legally changed its name to the "César Chávez Foundation" on June 30, 2010.

Effective August 20, 2019, the Cesar Chavez Foundation traded KUFW to Educational Media Foundation, in exchange for 106.3 KVPW, to consummate a deal that had been announced three years earlier. KUFW became an affiliate of K-Love, and changed its call sign to KLXY.
