= KVCP =

VCY America radio station in Phoenix

- Phoenix, Arizona; United States
- Broadcast area: Phoenix metropolitan area
- Frequency: 88.3 MHz (HD Radio)

Programming
- Format: Conservative Christian
- Subchannels: HD2: VCY Sacred Stylings; HD3: VCY Spanish; HD4: Family Radio
- Network: VCY America

Ownership
- Owner: VCY America, Inc.

History
- First air date: October 23, 1991
- Former call signs: KNAI (1987–2017); KNAI-FM (2017–2018); KCCF-FM (2018)
- Call sign meaning: VCY/Phoenix

Technical information
- Facility ID: 47667
- Class: C1
- ERP: 22,500 watts
- HAAT: 304 meters (997 ft)
- Transmitter coordinates: 33.596°N 112.092°W
- Translator: HD4: 107.5 K298CK (Phoenix)

Links
- Webcast: Listen Live
- Website: vcyamerica.org

KVCP (88.3 FM) is a radio station in Phoenix, Arizona, United States, broadcasting the VCY America Christian talk and teaching network. Its transmitter is located on Shaw Butte.

This facility began broadcasting in October 1991 as KNAI, owned by the National Farm Workers Service Center, a subsidiary of the United Farm Workers union later known as the César Chávez Foundation. Known for most of its history as La Campesina, KNAI broadcast a Regional Mexican format and was one of a network of stations owned by the group, later known as the César Chávez Foundation. KNAI operated on a share-time basis with KPHF, a transmitter for the Family Radio network, with KNAI airing from 5 a.m. to 7:30 p.m. and Family Radio at night. In 2017, ahead legal action by the Federal Communications Commission over impermissible underwriting spots on the two non-commercial Radio Campesina stations, KNAI moved to 860 AM and 101.9 FM. VCY America bought the license in 2018. In 2023, VCY America and Family Radio entered into an agreement to allow VCY to go full-time on 88.3 MHz in exchange for money and use of an HD Radio subchannel to feed its translator, K298CK, located at the same site.

== History ==
The station went on the air in 1991 as KNAI, broadcasting a radio format of Regional Mexican music and information for farm workers and other immigrants from Mexico. The station was owned by the National Farm Workers Service Center, Inc., which came to own stations in California, Nevada, Arizona, and Washington state, and branded as La Campesina. The word "campesina" translates to "peasant" or "farmworker". The station held a non-commercial educational license and was incorporated into the activism mission of the union. Through the 1990s, La Campesina was the highest-rated Spanish-language radio station in Phoenix, though its lead eroded as new Spanish-language radio stations started up in the late 1990s and early 2000s. On June 30, 2010, National Farm Workers Service Center, Inc., legally changed its name to the César Chávez Foundation. At that time, it owned two non-commercial stations: KNAI and KUFW in Woodlake, California.

In March 2017, it was announced that the César Chávez Foundation was planning to buy Phoenix AM station KMVP (860 AM), which would allow programming to be heard around the clock in the Phoenix media market while KNAI was off the air. On May 15, 2017, KNAI added the "-FM" suffix; the same day, KMVP changed its call letters to KNAI. CCF paired 860 AM with an FM translator, and in October, La Campesina moved exclusively to 860 AM and 101.9 FM; the station then began airing a loop directing listeners to the new frequencies. KNAI-FM changed its call sign to KCCF-FM on February 8, 2018. The move of the "La Campesina" programming from a non-commercial educational station to a commercial radio station coincided with a $115,000 fine for violations of the FCC's underwriting regulations at KNAI-FM and KUFW; the network's other stations operate on a commercial basis.

On September 24, 2018, the Cesar Chavez Foundation announced that they had sold KCCF-FM to Wisconsin-based evangelical Christian broadcaster VCY America for $4.9 million, who was to maintain the shared-time arrangement with Family Radio and KPHF, making 88.3 a full-time Christian station, albeit with two different operators and licenses. The sale was consummated on December 31, 2018, at which point VCY America changed the station's call sign to KVCP.

On March 22, 2023, Family Radio surrendered KPHF's license to the Federal Communications Commission for cancellation, and it was cancelled the next day. In exchange for the license surrender and the ability to take over the frequency on a full-time basis, VCY America paid Family Radio $800,000 and agreed to carry Family Radio's programming on an HD Radio subchannel of KVCP, feeding Family Radio's translator, K298CK. Additionally, Family Radio agreed to carry VCY America's programming on the HD2 channel of its KEBR in Sacramento, California.

== Translators ==
Broadcast translator for KVCP-HD4
Call sign	Frequency	City of license	FID	ERP (W)	Class	FCC info
K298CK	107.5 FM	Phoenix, Arizona	149325	65	D	LMS
