= KNAI (AM) =

Regional Mexican radio station in Phoenix

- Phoenix, Arizona; United States
- Broadcast area: Phoenix metropolitan area
- Frequency: 860 kHz
- Branding: La Campesina 101.9

Programming
- Format: Regional Mexican

Ownership
- Owner: Chavez Radio Group

History
- First air date: November 22, 1949 (as KIFN)
- Former call signs: KIFN (1949–1982); KVVA (1982–1996); KMVP (1996–2017)

Technical information
- Licensing authority: FCC
- Facility ID: 1326
- Class: B
- Power: 940 watts day; 1,000 watts night
- Transmitter coordinates: 33°25′15.8″N 112°7′39.8″W
- Translators: 101.9 K270BZ (Phoenix); 101.9 K270CV (Santan); 101.9 K270CW (Buckeye)

Links
- Public license information: Public file; LMS
- Website: campesina.net

KNAI (860 kHz; "La Campesina 101.9") is a Regional Mexican-formatted AM radio station in Phoenix, Arizona. KNAI is owned by the Chavez Radio Group. Its studios are located in Phoenix near Piestewa Peak and its transmitter is in South Phoenix near Broadway and 27th Avenue.

KNAI operates by day with 940 watts non-directional and at 1,000 watts at night with a directional antenna. Its programming is also heard on two translator stations, K270BZ (101.9 FM) and K270CV (101.9 FM).

AM 860 is a Canadian clear-channel frequency, on which CJBC in Toronto is the dominant Class A station.

== History ==
=== KIFN and KVVA ===
On June 8, 1949, the Western Broadcasting Company received the construction permit to build a new radio station in Phoenix, Arizona, on 860 kHz. Construction work on KIFN's facilities in Riverside Park began in September, and an accelerated schedule allowed Arizona's first full-time Spanish-language radio station, KIFN signed on at midnight on Tuesday, November 22. KIFN initially broadcast with 250 watts but benefited from an increase to 1,000 watts in 1952. From the time it signed on until the early 1980s, KIFN operated as a daytime-only station; 860 is a Canadian clear channel frequency, limiting the coverage of American stations operating at 860.

The partners in Western sold their interests to H. Walker Harrison in 1959. Harrison sold KIFN in 1966 to the Tichenor family, which owned a group of Spanish-language stations that ultimately became the Hispanic Broadcasting Corporation. Mauricio Méndez, operating as Hispanic Communications Corporation, acquired KIFN in 1979.

Citing the difficulty of getting authorization to go to 24-hour operation on 860 and facing competition from 24-hour station KPHX, Méndez sold KIFN in 1982 to Beta Communications, bringing it under common ownership with Apache Junction's KSTM-FM. Beta relaunched the station as KVVA ("Viva"), retaining its Spanish-language format. In 1987, Beta changed KSTM-FM, a rock station known as "The Storm", to KVVA-FM, a more contemporary Spanish-language station, to pair with KVVA AM; it was the first Spanish-language FM station for Phoenix since KNNN had been sold in 1984 and flipped formats. Among the programs aired in this era was a simulcast of KTSP-TV's 10 p.m. news, which began in 1988.

=== As a sports station ===
In 1996, KVVA-AM-FM went bankrupt, and the two stations found different buyers at auction. All of the Spanish-language programming moved to KVVA-FM, which was bought by Z-Spanish Network, a predecessor to Entravision Communications Corporation. The AM frequency, however, was purchased by Pulitzer Broadcasting Company, which acquired it with intentions on moving play-by-play sports contracts from KTAR (then a news/talk outlet) to 860. Pulitzer beat out MAC America Communications, owners of KTVK-TV and KESZ, for the frequency. On December 12, 1996, KVVA left AM, ending 47 straight years of Spanish-language radio on 860. Pulitzer relaunched the station with new call letters KMVP (for "most valuable player"). Eventually, fans and team owners found the KMVP nighttime signal too weak to cover the entire Phoenix metropolitan area for play-by-play coverage, and the Phoenix Suns and Arizona Diamondbacks moved back to KTAR with KMVP retaining broadcasts of the Phoenix Mercury and Arizona Rattlers games. Over time, KMVP added more national sports talk (including ESPN Radio) and less local programs.

Along with KTAR, ownership passed from Pulitzer to Hearst-Argyle, then Emmis Communications, and then Bonneville International, a subsidiary of the Church of Jesus Christ of Latter-day Saints.

When KTAR became a full-time sports station in 2007, it simulcast the programs of KMVP. The simulcast of KTAR and KMVP ended on April 14, 2007. On August 27, KMVP converted to Spanish language religious programming from Radio Vida Abundante. It later became a gospel music station, under a time brokerage agreement.

KMVP continued to air some sports programs. When Bonneville's two Phoenix sports stations, KMVP-FM and KTAR, were already committed to running other sporting events, KMVP aired the "overflow" games, such as Phoenix Coyotes play-by-play and Arizona State Sun Devils basketball. In 2016, Bonneville reassumed control of KMVP, and started simulcasting sister sports station KMVP-FM.

=== Sale to CCF ===
On March 9, 2017, Bonneville announced that it would sell KMVP to César Chávez Foundation’s Farmworker Educational Radio Network, Inc. for $800,000; the foundation already owned KNAI (88.3 FM) in Phoenix. The sale was completed on May 15, 2017; concurrently, the call letters changed to KNAI while 88.3 became KNAI-FM.

On May 15, 2017, 860 AM dropped the KMVP-FM simulcast and began simulcasting KNAI-FM's Regional Mexican format, including programming after KNAI-FM's handover to KPHF at 7:30 pm each night. In August, after remediating interference concerns, newly bought translator K270BZ, which prior to going dark had been relaying KKFR from South Mountain, re-emerged to be fed by KNAI. In October 2017, the "La Campesina" programming moved exclusively to 860 AM and 101.9 FM; 88.3 FM, which changed its call letters to KCCF-FM, then began carrying a loop directing listeners to KNAI. KCCF-FM was sold to VCY America in 2018.

== Translators ==
Broadcast translators for KNAI
Call sign	Frequency	City of license	FID	ERP (W)	Class	Transmitter coordinates	FCC info
K270BZ	101.9 FM	Phoenix, Arizona	152717	250	D	33°20′5.0″N 112°3′42.0″W	LMS
K270CV	101.9 FM	Santan, Arizona	146671	250	D	33°14′15.2″N 111°31′51.5″W	LMS
K270CW	101.9 FM	Buckeye, Arizona	202759	250	D	33°34′2.1″N 112°33′28.6″W	LMS
