= Sun Lakes, Arizona =

Census-designated place in Maricopa County, Arizona, United States

- Census-designated place
- Location in Maricopa County and the state of Arizona

- Location within Arizona Location within the United States
- Coordinates: 33°12′53″N 111°52′12″W
- Country: United States
- State: Arizona
- County: Maricopa

Area
  - Total: 5.40 sq mi (13.98 km^{2})
  - Land: 5.37 sq mi (13.92 km^{2})
  - Water: 0.023 sq mi (0.06 km^{2})
- Elevation: 1,194 ft (364 m)

Population (2020)
  - Total: 14,868
  - Density: 2,770/sq mi (1,068/km^{2})
- Time zone: UTC-7 (MST (no DST))
- ZIP code: 85248
- Area code: 480
- FIPS code: 04-70530
- GNIS feature ID: 2410025

Sun Lakes is a census-designated place (CDP) in Maricopa County, Arizona, United States. The population was 14,868 at the 2020 census. Sun Lakes is an active adult community comprising five country club communities in three homeowner associations. These include the gated communities of Oakwood and IronWood (IronOaks), the gated and non-gated communities of Palo Verde and Cottonwood (Cottonwood Palo Verde), and the non-gated community of Sun Lakes 1.

== Geography ==
Sun Lakes is located along the southeastern border of Maricopa County. It is bordered to the north and east by the city of Chandler and to the south by unincorporated Goodyear Village in Pinal County. Sun Lakes is 2.5 miles (4 km) east of Interstate 10 and 25 miles (40 km) southwest of downtown Phoenix.

According to the United States Census Bureau, the CDP has a total area of 5.4 square miles (14 km^{2}), of which 0.02 square miles (0.05 km^{2}), or 0.41%, are water.

== Demographics ==
=== Racial and ethnic composition ===
Sun Lakes CDP, Arizona – Racial composition Note: the US Census treats Hispanic/Latino as an ethnic category. This table excludes Latinos from the racial categories and assigns them to a separate category. Hispanics/Latinos may be of any race.
Race (NH = Non-Hispanic)	2020	2010	2000	1990	1980
White alone (NH)	93.1% (13,836)	95.5% (13,351)	97.5% (11,642)	98.2% (6,459)	99.1% (1,908)
Black alone (NH)	1.2% (182)	1.2% (169)	0.8% (93)	0.5% (31)	0.1% (1)
American Indian alone (NH)	0.2% (31)	0.2% (26)	0.1% (16)	0.2% (11)	0.2% (4)
Asian alone (NH)	1.3% (186)	0.8% (118)	0.3% (37)	0.2% (11)	
Pacific Islander alone (NH)	0.1% (12)	0% (3)	0% (0)		
Other race alone (NH)	0.2% (27)	0% (4)	0% (3)	0% (0)	
Multiracial (NH)	1.4% (208)	0.4% (55)	0.3% (33)	—	—
Hispanic/Latino (any race)	2.6% (386)	1.8% (249)	0.9% (112)	1% (66)	0.6% (12)

Historical population
Census	Pop.	Note	%±
1980	1,925		—
1990	6,578		241.7%
2000	11,936		81.5%
2010	13,975		17.1%
2020	14,868		6.4%

=== 2020 census ===
As of the 2020 census, Sun Lakes had a population of 14,868. The median age was 73.6 years. 0.6% of residents were under the age of 18 and 79.1% of residents were 65 years of age or older. For every 100 females, there were 77.4 males, and for every 100 females age 18 and over, there were 77.2 males age 18 and over.

100.0% of residents lived in urban areas, while 0.0% lived in rural areas.

There were 8,772 households in Sun Lakes, of which 1.9% had children under the age of 18 living in them. Of all households, 54.2% were married-couple households, 11.7% were households with a male householder and no spouse or partner present, and 31.0% were households with a female householder and no spouse or partner present. About 36.4% of all households were made up of individuals, and 31.3% had someone living alone who was 65 years of age or older.

There were 10,222 housing units, of which 14.2% were vacant. The homeowner vacancy rate was 1.1% and the rental vacancy rate was 10.3%.

=== 2000 census ===
At the 2000 census there were 11,936 people, 6,683 households, and 4,798 families in the CDP. The population density was 2,278.7 inhabitants per square mile (879.8/km^{2}). There were 7,746 housing units at an average density of 1,478.8 per square mile (571.0/km^{2}). The racial makeup of the CDP was 98.4% White, 0.8% Black or African American, 0.1% Native American, 0.3% Asian, <0.1% Pacific Islander, 0.1% from other races, and 0.3% from two or more races. 0.9% of the population were Hispanic or Latino of any race.

Of the 6,683 households 0.1% had children under the age of 18 living with them, 69.5% were married couples living together, 1.8% had a female householder with no husband present, and 28.2% were non-families. 25.8% of households were one person and 20.6% were one person aged 65 or older. The average household size was 1.79 and the average family size was 2.06.

The age distribution was 0.2% under the age of 18, 0.3% from 18 to 24, 2.1% from 25 to 44, 31.3% from 45 to 64, and 66.2% 65 or older. The median age was 69 years. For every 100 females, there were 82.6 males. For every 100 females age 18 and over, there were 82.6 males.

The median household income was $43,634 and the median family income was $50,333. Males had a median income of $46,250 versus $35,350 for females. The per capita income for the CDP was $33,394. About 2.0% of families and 2.8% of the population were below the poverty line, including none of those under age 18 and 3.0% of those age 65 or over.

== Education ==
It is in the Chandler Unified School District.
