= K14SC-D =

Ashland, Oregon; United States
- Channels: Digital: 14 (UHF); Virtual: 39

Ownership
- Owner: WatchTV, Inc

History
- Founded: April 15, 1996
- Former call signs: K39EF (1994-2013); K39EF-D (2013-2018)
- Former channel number(s): Analog: 39 (UHF, 1996-2013); Digital: 39 (UHF, 2013-2018)
- Former affiliations: Telemundo; HSN

K14SC-D, virtual channel 39 (UHF digital channel 14), is a low-powered television station licensed to Ashland, Oregon, United States. The station is owned by Watch TV, Inc.
