= WCMN-LD =

Television station in Minnesota

ATSC 3.0 station

St. Cloud–Sartell, Minnesota; United States
- Channels: Digital: 14 (UHF); Virtual: 13

Programming
- Affiliations: Religious Independent

Ownership
- Owner: Starcom, LLC

History
- Founded: August 28, 1989
- First air date: June 9, 1992
- Former call signs: K13VS (1989–1996); WCMN-LP (1996–2022)
- Former channel number: Analog: 13 (VHF, 1992–2022)
- Former affiliations: Silent (2021–2022)
- Call sign meaning: Central Minnesota

Technical information
- Licensing authority: FCC
- Facility ID: 62341
- Class: LD
- ERP: 15 kW
- HAAT: 95.1 m (312 ft)
- Transmitter coordinates: 45°32′35″N 94°15′42″W

Links
- Public license information: LMS

WCMN-LD (channel 13) is a low-power television station licensed to both St. Cloud and Sartell, Minnesota, United States, which primarily broadcasts religious programming. Owned by StarCom, LLC, the station maintains a transmitter on Julep Road (off State Highway 23) in Waite Park, Minnesota.

== History ==
Channel 13 began as K13VS in 1992; it was affiliated with the Main Street TV network and was the first new TV venture in St. Cloud since KXLI channel 41 started in 1982. While it also aired several local shows, it was hindered by a lack of visibility on cable systems. By 1994, the station was purchasing time on a local cable channel to make its weekday evening shows, including a local newscast available to cable homes.

StarCom sold three radio stations to Regent Broadcasting in 2000 so it could purchase and develop channel 13, which had become WCMN-LP in 1996. It returned to the air on August 20, 2001, airing All News Channel with local inserts. When ANC folded in 2002, the station switched to America One and then The Sportsman Channel.

On January 4, 2022, the station filed a license to cover application for digital facilities, stating that it is broadcasting in the ATSC 3.0 format, making it the first such station in Minnesota. It had operated in analog on VHF channel 13 until the FCC-mandated shutdown of analog LPTV stations on July 13, 2021, and did not construct an ATSC 1.0 facility. The station was licensed for digital operation effective September 21, 2022, changing its call sign to WCMN-LD.
