= KZPK =

Radio station in Paynesville–St. Cloud, Minnesota, United States

Coordinates: 45.567°N 94.512°W

- Paynesville, Minnesota; United States
- Broadcast area: St. Cloud, Minnesota; Central Minnesota
- Frequency: 98.9 MHz (HD Radio)
- Branding: Wild Country 99

Programming
- Format: Country
- Subchannels: HD2: Talk radio (KNSI); HD3: Classic rock

Ownership
- Owner: Leighton Media; (Leighton Enterprises, Inc.)
- Sister stations: KCLD-FM; KCML; KNSI; K277BS

History
- First air date: 1995

Technical information
- Licensing authority: FCC
- Facility ID: 57562
- Class: C2
- ERP: 24,000 watts
- HAAT: 220 meters (720 ft)
- Translator: HD3: 103.3 K277BS (St. Cloud)

Links
- Public license information: Public file; LMS
- Webcast: Listen live; Listen live (HD3)
- Website: www.wildcountry99.com www.zrock1033.com (HD3)

KZPK (98.9 FM) is a radio station in St. Cloud, Minnesota, airing a country music format. The station is owned by Leighton Media. KZPK broadcasts with an effective radiated power of 24,000 watts from a tower located west of St. Cloud. The station shares this tower facility with its sister station, KCLD-FM, which operates from the top of the structure at 980 feet (300 m). While KZPK’s signal is transmitted from a lower height of 152 meters (499 ft) and a lower wattage compared to KCLD's 100,000-watt signal, it still provides substantial coverage throughout the St. Cloud metropolitan area.

== History ==
In 1987, Paynesville Broadcasting Company petitioned the Federal Communications Commission (FCC) to allot an FM frequency to Paynesville, Minnesota. The FCC added channel 255C2, operating at 98.9 MHz, to the community's table of allotments in July 1988. It was Paynesville's first local FM allocation.

Patrick M. McCabe applied for the frequency on August 26, 1988. The FCC granted him a construction permit on November 28, 1990, authorizing a station with an effective radiated power of 50,000 watts and an antenna height of 150 meters (490 ft) above average terrain. The call sign KZPK was assigned on February 1, 1991. McCabe subsequently transferred the permit to Katrick Broadcasting, a company he headed. Katrick then agreed to sell the unbuilt station to broadcaster Ronald J. Linder for $120,000. The FCC approved that assignment on November 20, 1991.

Linder applied in December 1992 to relocate the transmitter and modify the proposed facilities to 47.3 kW at 152 meters (499 ft) above average terrain. The FCC approved the modification and an extension of the construction permit on June 1, 1995. KZPK began broadcasting near the end of 1995 with a country music format. An industry listing published in January 1996 described it as a new station carrying Westwood One's Hot Country service, while another contemporary publication identified its branding as "Wild Country". Linder had filed the station's license-to-cover application on December 1, 1995; the FCC granted the permanent license on May 21, 1996.

In January 1997, Leighton Enterprises agreed to purchase KZPK from Linder for $1 million. The terms included payment of an existing $150,000 promissory note and a five-year, $850,000 note. The FCC approved the license assignment on April 15, 1997, placing KZPK under common ownership with Leighton's other St. Cloud-area stations.

KZPK shortened its branding from "Wild Country 98.9" to "Wild 98-9" in July 2002. It adopted the "Wild Country 99" name in July 2004, while retaining its country format.

The FCC approved a modification of KZPK's facilities in 2013. The station raised its antenna height from 152 to 220 meters (499 to 722 ft) above average terrain while reducing its effective radiated power from 47.3 to 24 kW.

In March 2018, a classic-rock service branded "Z-Rock" began broadcasting on KZPK's third HD Radio channel. The service was relayed in St. Cloud by translator K277BS at 103.3 MHz, which previously had relayed sister station KNSI.

KZPK morning hosts Kelly Jordan and Matt Wood won the small-market Personality/Show award at the 2022 CRS/Country Aircheck Awards. In 2023, KZPK was a finalist for the National Association of Broadcasters' Marconi Radio Award for Small Market Station of the Year, while Jordan and Wood were finalists for Small Market Personality of the Year.

== HD Radio ==
K277BS/KZPK-HD3 logo since March 2018

During the summer of 2017, KZPK started broadcasting in HD Radio, carrying the main signal on HD1, a simulcast of KNSI 1450 AM on HD2 which is news/talk, and a classic rock format on HD3 branded as "Z-Rock 103.3".

The station's HD-3 channel is available over traditional radio on 103.3 FM via translator K277BS, licensed to St. Cloud. On March 5, 2018 it was announced that K277BS would flip to classic rock as "Z-Rock"; the programming on K277BS would originate from KZPK-HD3. The first song on "Z-Rock" was Bohemian Rhapsody by Queen. KNSI signed on a new FM translator (K257GK) at 99.3 MHz, which is KNSI's current FM translator. In 2021, KZPK HD3/K277BS quietly rebranded as "Real Rock Z103" with no change in format. In 2023, KZPK HD3/K277BS reverted to its previous "ZRock" branding with no change in format. The station competes with Townsquare Media's classic rock KLZZ, and Tri-County Broadcasting's active rock WHMH-FM.
