= List of AM stereo radio stations =

The following is a list of AM radio stations transmitting in C-QUAM stereo throughout the world, which can be sorted by their call signs, frequencies, cities of license, country of origin, licensees, and programming formats.

Japanese stations sometimes omit the JO prefix in favor of just the last two letters of their callsigns. Australia issues callsigns, but not using the country’s ITU prefix. Station names in quotes are from countries that do not issue ITU callsigns, and are listed after stations from countries that do issue callsigns.

Call sign, or name (in quotes)	Frequency (kHz)	City of License	Country	Owner (Licensee)	Format
CKJH	750	Melfort, Saskatchewan	Canada	Jim Pattison Group	Adult Hits
DWIZ	882	Pasig, Metro Manila	Philippines	Aliw Broadcasting Corporation	News/Talk
DWPM	630	Quezon City, Metro Manila	Philippines	Baycomms Broadcasting Corporation	News/Talk
DWRS	927	Vigan, Ilocos Sur	Philippines	Solidnorth Broadcasting System	News/Talk
DYDD	1260	Cebu City, Cebu	Philippines	Sarraga Integrated and Management Corporation	News, Public Affairs, Music
DYRC	648	Cebu City, Cebu	Philippines	Manila Broadcasting Company	News/Talk
DYRL	1035	Bacolod, Negros Occidental	Philippines	Radio Corporation of the Philippines	News/Talk
DZAS	702	Pasig, Metro Manila	Philippines	Far East Broadcasting Company	Religion
DZME	1530	Pasig, Metro Manila	Philippines	Capitol Broadcasting Center	Variety
DZXL	558	Makati, Metro Manila	Philippines	Radio Mindanao Network	News/Talk
HLSQ	792	Ilsan, Goyang City, Gyeonggi Province	South Korea	Seoul Broadcasting System	Trot Music/K-Pop
HOJ2	1040	Las Tablas, Los Santos	Panama		
JOUF	1314	Osaka, Kansai Region	Japan	Sankei Shimbun	Talk, sports
JOVF	1431	Wakayama	Japan		
KBMR	1130	Bismarck, North Dakota	United States	Bismarck-Mandan Radio	Classic Country
KBPS	1450	Portland, Oregon	United States	Portland Public Schools	High school radio
KCLI	1320	Clinton, Oklahoma	United States	Wright Broadcasting Systems	Sports
KCSR	610	Chadron, Nebraska	United States	Chadrad Communications, Inc.	Country
KFRO	1370	Longview, Texas	United States	RCA Broadcasting, LLC	Classic Hits 70s and 80s
KGAK	1330	Gallup, New Mexico	United States	KRJG, Inc.	Navajo language
KINY	800	Juneau, Alaska	United States	Alaska Broadcast Communications	Full Service
KKIN	930	Aitkin, Minnesota	United States	R&J Broadcasting	Oldies, classic hits, adult standards
KLRB	880	Sheridan, Arkansas	United States	Broadcast Industry Group, LLC	Classic Rock
KQWB	1660	West Fargo, North Dakota	United States	Radio FM Media	Sports
KRGE	1290	Weslaco, Texas	United States	Christian Ministries of the Valley	Spanish Christian
KRRS	1460	Santa Rosa, California	United States	California Broadcasting Company, LLC	Regional Mexican
KSUM	1370	Fairmont, Minnesota	United States	City of Lakes Media	Country
KSVE	1650	El Paso, Texas	United States	Entravision Communications	Spanish-language sports
KTIC	840	West Point, Nebraska	United States	Nebraska Rural Radio Association	Classic Country
KVON	1440	Napa, California	United States	Wine Down Media, LLC	Spanish adult contemporary
KWHW	1450	Altus, Oklahoma	United States	Monarch Broadcasting, Inc.	Country
KYET	1170	Golden Valley, Arizona	United States	Grand Canyon Gateway Broadcasting, LLC	Classic country
KYMO	1080	East Prairie, Missouri	United States	Delta Broadcasting, LLC	Classic country
WARB	700	Dothan, Alabama	United States	Alarado Media, LLC	Urban contemporary
WATX	1220	Hamden, Connecticut	United States	Clark Smidt Media, LLC	Oldies
WBBT	1340	Lyons, Georgia	United States	T.C.B. Broadcasting, Inc	Oldies
WBLQ	1230	Westerly, Rhode Island	United States	Christopher DiPaola d/b/a Diponti Communications	Community radio
WEMG	1310	Camden, New Jersey	United States	Mega-Philadelphia LLC	Spanish hits
WENK	1240	Union City, Tennessee	United States	Forever Media	Oldies
WGOL	920	Russellville, Alabama	United States	Pilati Investments Corporation	Country
WIKE	1490	Newport, Vermont	United States	Vermont Broadcast Associates, Inc.	Classic rock
WIOE	1450	Fort Wayne, Indiana	United States	Brian Walsh	Oldies
WION	1430	Ionia, Michigan	United States	Packer Radio WION, LLC	Full service, adult hits
WJIB	720	Cambridge, Massachusetts	United States	RCRQ, Inc.	Adult standards
WJMO	1300	Cleveland, Ohio	United States	Urban One	Tropical
WKDA	900	Lebanon, Tennessee	United States	Wilson County Broadcasting, Inc.	Spanish-language religion
WKHB	620	Irwin, Pennsylvania	United States	Broadcast Communications, Inc.	Brokered time
WLWL	770	Rockingham, North Carolina	United States	Beach Music Broadcasting, Inc.	Beach music
WMMI	830	Shepherd, Michigan	United States	Latitude Media	Classic country
WNNC	1230	Newton, North Carolina	United States	Newton-Conover Communications	Oldies
WOAP	1080	Owosso, Michigan	United States	Cano's Broadcasting, LLC	Adult hits
WOKR	1310	Canandaigua, New York	United States	Genesee Media Corporation	Classic country
WPAX	1240	Thomasville, Georgia	United States	Lenrob Enterprises, Inc.	Adult standards/MOR
WPCI	1490	Greenville, South Carolina	United States	Paper Cutters, Inc.	Eclectic
WPET	950	Greensboro, North Carolina	United States	Truth Broadcasting Corporation	Religious
WRDN	1430	Durand, Wisconsin	United States	Durand Broadcasting, LLC	Country music
WRDZ	1300	La Grange, Illinois	United States	Polnet Communications, Ltd.	Hard rock/heavy metal
WTOU	1660	Kalamazoo, Michigan	United States	Midwest Communications	Sports
WWLX	590	Loretto, Tennessee	United States	Prospect Communications	Variety Hits
WXYG	540	Sauk Rapids, Minnesota	United States	Tri-County Broadcasting	Album-oriented rock (AOR)
WYLD	940	New Orleans, Louisiana	United States	iHeartMedia	Urban Gospel
WZZB	1390	Seymour, Indiana	United States	Midnight Hour Broadcasting, LLC	Adult contemporary
ZYJ494	920	Volta Redonda, Rio de Janeiro	Brazil		
ZYK280	1080	Porto Alegre, Rio Grande do Sul	Brazil	Federal University of Rio Grande do Sul	College radio
"4WK"	963	Toowoomba, Queensland	Australia	Broadcast Operations Group	Classic Hits, Talk
"AMAX-385"	1098	Athens	Greece		
"Amica Radio Veneta"	1017	Vigonza, Province of Padova, Veneto	Italy		Italian Folk music
"Broadcast Italia"	1485	Rome	Italy	Liberevoci	Rebroadcasts of Italian radio pirates from 1975-1980
"Dreamradio AM"	1485	Baexem, Leudal, Limburg	Netherlands		
"Jor. Sor. 1"	657	Bangkok	Thailand	Krom Thahan Suesan (Army Signals Department)	
"Jor. Sor. 5"	567	Tambon Ban Lao, Chaiyaphum Province	Thailand	Krom Thahan Suesan (Army Signals Department)	
"Jor. Sor. 6"	1458	Tambon Mueang Tai, Si Sa Ket Province	Thailand	Krom Thahan Suesan (Army Signals Department)	
"Mini Radio"	1512	Castano Primo, Province of Milan, Lombardy	Italy		Electronic dance music
“Mor. Kor.”	1107	Nong Khaem	Thailand	Sathani Witthayu Krachaisiang Mahawitthayalai Kasetsat (Kasetsart University Radio Network)	
“Mor. Thor.”	981	Rangsit, Pathum Thani Province	Thailand	Thammasat University	
“Mor. Thor. Bor. Sip-Et”	630	Bangkok	Thailand	Monthon Thahan Bok Thi Sip-Et (11th Military Circle, 1st Army Area)	
“Mor. Thor. Bor. Sip-Et”	1053	Bangkok	Thailand	Monthon Thahan Bok Thi Sip-Et (11th Military Circle, 1st Army Area)	
“Mor. Thor. Bor. Thi Sam Sip Et”	801	Fort Chiraprawat, Mueang Nakhon Sawan District, Nakhon Sawan Province	Thailand	31st Military Circle, 3rd Army Area	
“Nueng Por. Nor.”	765	Tambon Pong Yang Khok, Lampang Province	Thailand	Post & Telegraph Department	
“Nueng Por. Nor. Phak Phiset”	1035	Bangkok	Thailand	Krom Praisani Thoralek (Post & Telegraph Department Radio Station, Special Section)	
“Or. Sor.”	1332	Bangkok	Thailand		
”Phon Nueng. Ror. Or.”	1350	Bangkok	Thailand	Kong Phon Thi Nueng Raksa Phra Ong (1st Infantry Division, Royal Guard)	
”Phon Nueng Ror. Or.”	1422	Bangkok	Thailand	Kong Phon Thi Nueng Raksa Phra Ong (1st Infantry Division, Royal Guard)	
“Por. Tor. Or.”	594	Bangkok	Thailand	Kong Phon Thahan Puen Yai Tosue Akat Yan (Anti-Aircraft Artillery Division)	
"RadiOlina Atripalda"	1503	Atripalda, Avellino	Italy		
”Radio Gold”	1593	Sicily	Italy		Italian oldies
"Radio Impuls AMersfoort"	1485	Amersfoort	Netherlands	Hendriks Audio Enterprise	Variety
"Radio Melody"	1566		Italy		
"Radio Studio X"	1188	Pistoia, Province of Pistoia, Tuscany	Italy	Studio X Association	
"Radio Studio X"	1485	Livorno, Province of Livorno, Tuscany	Italy	Studio X Association	
"Radio Studio X"	1584	Arezzo, Province of Arezzo, Tuscany	Italy	Studio X Association	
"Radio T-POT"	918	Gasselternijveen, Drenthe	Netherlands		
"Radio de Vliegende Hollander"	1467	Meppel Drenthe	Netherlands		
“Ror. Dor. 747”	747	Bangkok	Thailand	Territorial Defence Department	
"RTHK Radio 3"	567	Golden Hill, Hong Kong	China (People's Republic)	Radio Television Hong Kong	Spoken word
"RTHK Radio 5"	783	Golden Hill, Hong Kong	China (People's Republic)	Radio Television Hong Kong	Public radio
“Sor. Or. Tor.”	1287	Tambon Bang Pla	Thailand	Sathani Witthayu Krom Utiniyom Witthaya (Meteorological Department, Ministry of Transport and Communications)	
“Sor. Wor. Thor.”	639	Lamphun Province	Thailand	Government of Thailand	
“Sor. Wor. Phor.”	1098	Tambon Ban Phru	Thailand	Sathani Witthayu Krachaisiang Phitaksantirat (Communications Division, Royal Thai Police)	
”Sor. Wor. Thor.”	990	Tambon Cho Ho, Nakhon Ratchasima Province	Thailand	Communications Division, Royal Thai Police	
“Sor. Wor. Thor.”	1593	Tambon Don Tako, Mueang Ratchaburi District	Thailand	Government of Thailand	
“Sor. Wor. Thor.”	558	Tambon Kaeng Sian, Mueang Kanchanburi District	Thailand	Government of Thailand	
“Sor. Wor. Thor.”	1260	Tambon Rim Kok	Thailand	Government of Thailand	
"Stereo 49"	1449	Lower Hutt, Wellington	New Zealand	P Caulfield	Relay of George FM
”Thor. Or. 01”	1233	Bangkok	Thailand	Thai Air Force	
“Thor. Phor. Nueng”	1206	Pran Buri District	Thailand	Kong Thap Phak Thi Nueng (1st Army Area)	
“Thor. Phor. Sam”	1116	Fort Somdet Phra Ekathotsarot	Thailand	Kong Thap Phak Thi Sam (3rd Army Area)	
”Wor. Por. Thor. 2”	738	Fort Kawila, Chiang Mai Province	Thailand	Local Radio, Communications Division, Army Signals Department	
”Wor. Sor. Por. 711”	711	Fort Phahonyothin, Lop Buri Province	Thailand	Witthayu Sun Kan Thahan Puen Yai (Artillery Centre)	
“Yan Kraw 1305”	1305	Tambon Pam Phriao	Thailand		
