= WROJ-LP =

- Saint Cloud, Minnesota; United States
- Broadcast area: Saint Cloud; Sauk Rapids
- Frequency: 96.1 MHz
- Branding: 96.1 Refuge.FM

Programming
- Format: Christian Contemporary

Ownership
- Owner: Calvary Chapel St. Cloud

History
- First air date: July 24, 2015

Technical information
- Licensing authority: FCC
- Facility ID: 194306
- Class: L1
- ERP: 100 watts
- HAAT: 28.0227 m (92 ft)
- Transmitter coordinates: 45°32′21.0″N 94°10′05.0″W

Links
- Public license information: LMS
- Webcast: Webstream
- Website: Official website

WROJ-LP is a Contemporary Christian formatted low-power broadcast radio station licensed to Saint Cloud, Minnesota, serving Saint Cloud and Sauk Rapids in Minnesota. The station signed on the air in late July 2015, from a tower shared with KNSI and KCML on St. Cloud's southeast side.
