= KFAM =

KFAM may refer to:

- KFAM-CD, a low-power television station (channel 24, virtual 14) licensed to serve Lake Charles, Louisiana, United States
- KCLD-FM, a radio station (104.7 FM) licensed to St. Cloud, Minnesota, which carried the KFAM-FM callsign from 1947 to 1975
- KNSI, a radio station (1450 AM) licensed to St. Cloud, Minnesota, which carried the KFAM callsign from 1938 to 1975
