= St. Cloud, Minnesota =

City in Minnesota, United States

- City
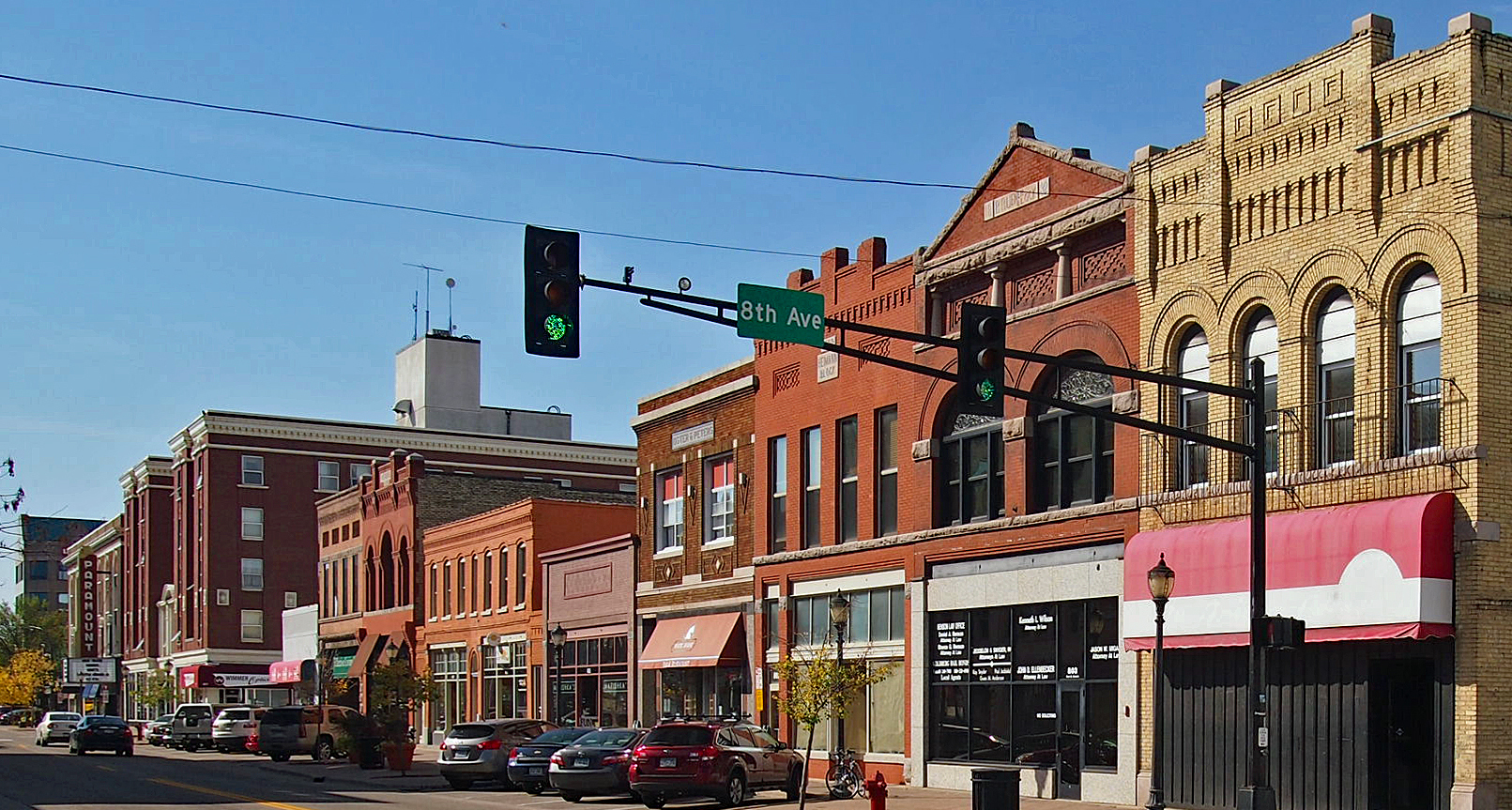
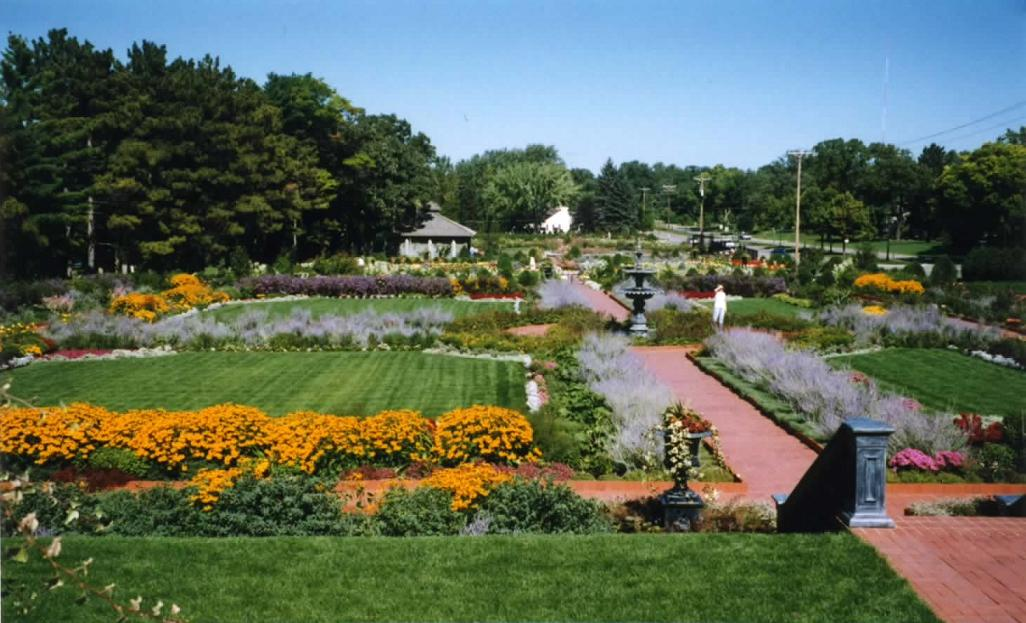
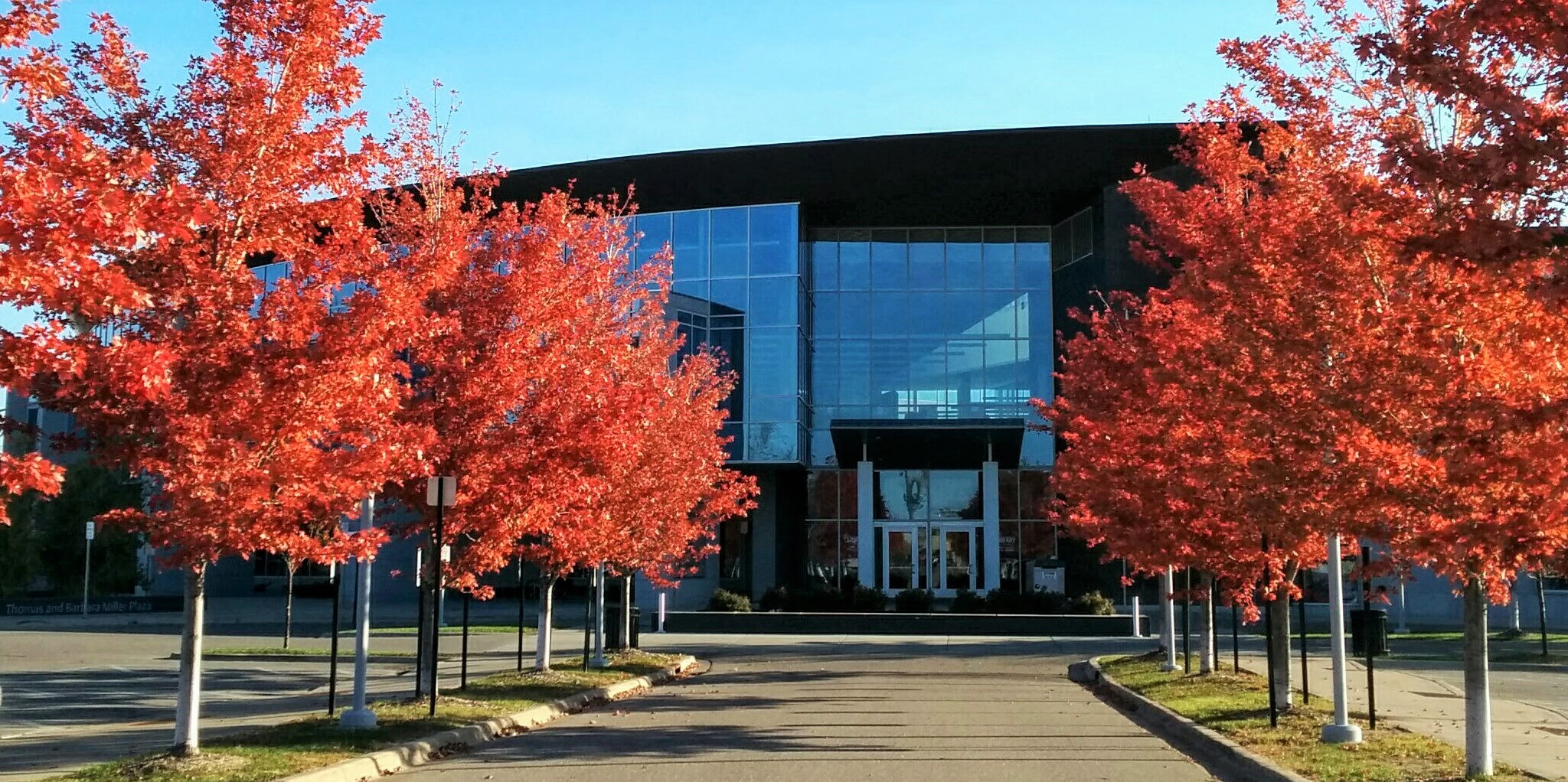
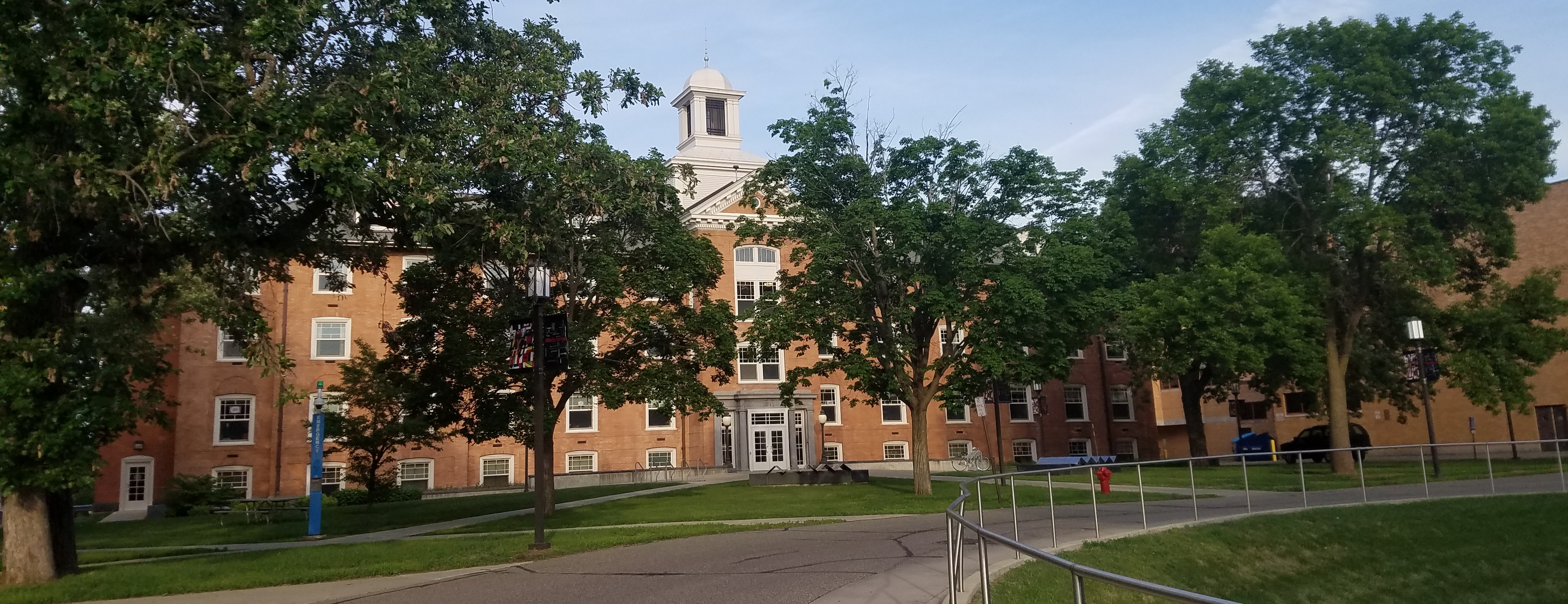
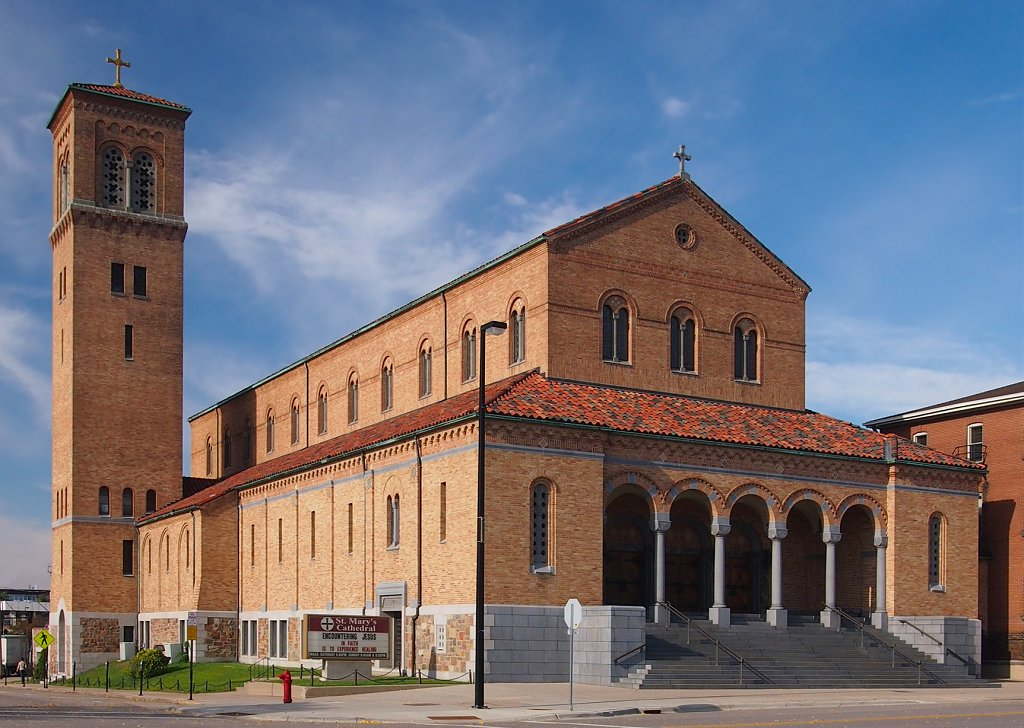
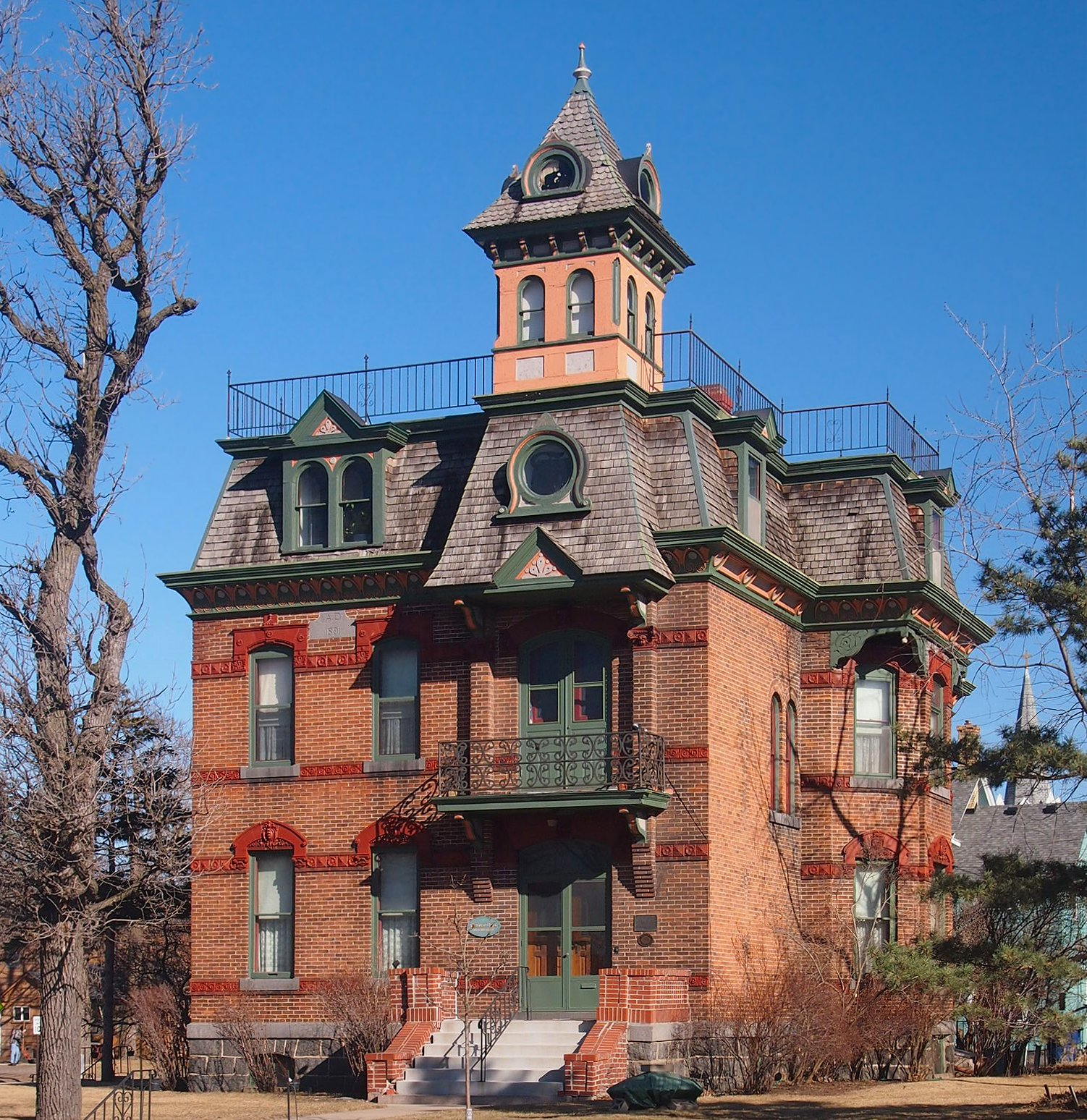
- Downtown St. Cloud Munsinger and Clemens Gardens Great River Regional Library St. Cloud State University Cathedral of St. Mary Michael Majerus House
- Nickname: "The Granite City"
- Interactive map of St. Cloud, Minnesota
- Location within Minnesota Location within the United States
- Coordinates: 45°32′03″N 94°10′18″W
- Country: United States
- State: Minnesota
- Counties: Stearns, Benton, Sherburne
- Founded: 1856
- Named for: Saint-Cloud, France

Government
  - Mayor: Jake Anderson

Area
  - City: 41.23 sq mi (106.78 km^{2})
  - Land: 40.17 sq mi (104.04 km^{2})
  - Water: 1.06 sq mi (2.74 km^{2})
- Elevation: 1,027 ft (313 m)

Population (2020)
  - City: 68,881
  - Estimate (2025): 71,118
  - Rank: US: 542nd MN: 12th
  - Density: 1,714.8/sq mi (662.08/km^{2})
  - Urban: 117,638 (US: 290th)
  - Metro: 201,868 (US: 229th)
- Time zone: UTC-6 (Central (CST))
  - Summer (DST): UTC-5 (CDT)
- ZIP codes: 56301, 56302, 56303, 56304, 56393, 56397, 56398
- Area code: 320
- FIPS code: 27-56896
- GNIS feature ID: 2396483
- Website: ci.stcloud.mn.us

St. Cloud or Saint Cloud (/ˈseɪnt klaʊd/; French: [sɛ̃ klu]) is a city in Stearns County, Minnesota, United States. The population was 68,881 at the 2020 census, making it Minnesota's 12th-most populous city. St. Cloud is the county seat of Stearns County, though it also extends into Benton and Sherburne counties. The city lies along the Mississippi River and is named after Saint-Cloud, a suburb of Paris named for the 6th-century monk Clodoald.

The St. Cloud metropolitan area has an estimated 206,000 residents and is Minnesota's fifth-largest metropolitan statistical area. St. Cloud is 65 miles (105 km) northwest of the Twin Cities of Minneapolis–St. Paul along Interstate 94, U.S. Highway 52 (conjoined with I-94), U.S. Highway 10, Minnesota State Highway 15, and Minnesota State Highway 23. The St. Cloud metropolitan area is included in the greater Minneapolis–St. Paul combined statistical area.

St. Cloud is home to St. Cloud State University, Minnesota's third-largest public university, located near the Beaver Islands, a group of around 30 undeveloped islands in the Mississippi River. These islands, part of a 12-mile designated wild and scenic river segment, attract kayakers and canoeists. The city also owns and operates Minnesota's largest municipally managed hydroelectric dam on the Mississippi River, which generates nearly nine megawatts of electricity, about 10% of the total output from the state's 11 hydroelectric dams on the river.

== History ==
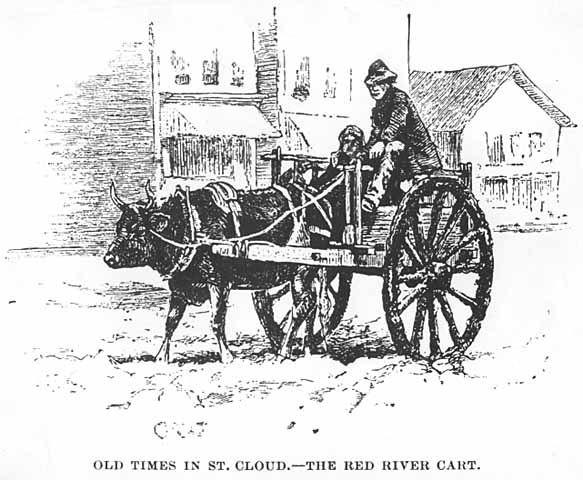
Red River cart at Saint Cloud, 1887

What is now the St. Cloud area was occupied by various Indigenous peoples for thousands of years. Voyageurs and coureurs des bois from New France first encountered the Ojibwe and Dakota through the highly profitable North American fur trade with local Native American peoples.

The Minnesota Territory was organized in 1849. The St. Cloud area opened up to homesteading after the Treaty of Traverse des Sioux was signed with the Dakota people in 1851. John L. Wilson, a Yankee homesteader from Columbia, Maine, with French Huguenot ancestry and an interest in Napoleon, named the settlement St. Cloud after Saint-Cloud, the Paris suburb where Napoleon had his favorite palace.

St. Cloud was a waystation on the Middle and Woods branches of the Red River Trails used by Métis traders between the Canada–U.S. border at Pembina, North Dakota, and Saint Paul, Minnesota. The cart trains often consisted of hundreds of oxcarts known as Red River carts. The Métis, bringing furs to trade for supplies to take back to their rural settlements, camped west of the city and crossed the Mississippi in St. Cloud or just to the north in Sauk Rapids.

The City of St. Cloud was incorporated in 1856. It developed from three distinct settlements, known as Upper Town, Middle Town, and Lower Town, that European-American settlers established starting in 1853. Remnants of the deep ravines that separated the three are still visible today. Middle Town was settled primarily by German Catholic immigrants and migrants from eastern states, who were recruited to the region by Father Francis Xavier Pierz, a Catholic priest who also ministered as a missionary to Native Americans.

Lower Town was founded by settlers from the Northern Tier of New England and the mid-Atlantic states, including former residents of upstate New York. Its Protestant settlers opposed slavery. Upper Town, or Arcadia, was plotted by General Sylvanus Lowry, a slaveholder and trader from Kentucky who brought slaves with him, although Minnesota was organized as a free territory. He served on the territorial council from 1852 to 1853 and was elected president of the newly formed town council in 1856, serving for one year (the office of mayor did not yet exist).

Jane Grey Swisshelm, an abolitionist newspaper editor who had migrated from Pittsburgh, repeatedly attacked Lowry in print. At one point Lowry organized a "Committee of Vigilance" that broke into Swisshelm's newspaper office and removed her press, throwing it into the Mississippi River. Lowry started a rival paper, The Union. In 1857, the U.S. Supreme Court ruled in Dred Scott that slaves could not file freedom suits and found the Missouri Compromise unconstitutional, so the territory's prohibition against slavery became unenforceable. Nearly all Southerners left the St. Cloud area when the Civil War broke out, taking their slaves with them. The number of slaves in the community was estimated in single digits at the 1860 census. Lowry died in the city in 1865.

Many young men from St. Cloud and the surrounding area served in the Union Army during the American Civil War. After it ended, many local Civil War veterans remained heavily involved in St. Cloud's chapter of the Grand Army of the Republic, and raised money for the building of a statue in memory of U.S. President Abraham Lincoln that still stands near the St. Germain Street bridge. Beginning in 1864, Stephen Miller served a two-year term as Minnesota governor, the only citizen of St. Cloud ever to hold the office. Miller was a "Pennsylvania German businessman", lawyer, writer, active abolitionist, and personal friend of Alexander Ramsey. He was on the state's Republican electoral ticket with Lincoln in 1860.

Steamboats regularly docked at St. Cloud as part of the fur trade and other commerce, although river levels were not reliable. This ended with the construction of the Coon Rapids Dam in 1912–14. Granite quarries have operated in the area since the 1880s, giving St. Cloud its nickname, "The Granite City". In 1917, Samuel Pandolfo started the Pan Motor Company in St. Cloud. He claimed his Pan-Cars would make St. Cloud the new Detroit, but the company failed at a time when resources were directed toward the World War I effort. He was later convicted and imprisoned for attempting to defraud investors.

According to documents at the Stearns History Museum, more than 2,000 residents from the heavily German-American St. Cloud area served in the U.S. military against their ancestral homeland during World War I. On January 26, 1918, President Woodrow Wilson wrote a letter to Bishop Joseph Francis Busch thanking him for his support of the war effort.

== Geography ==
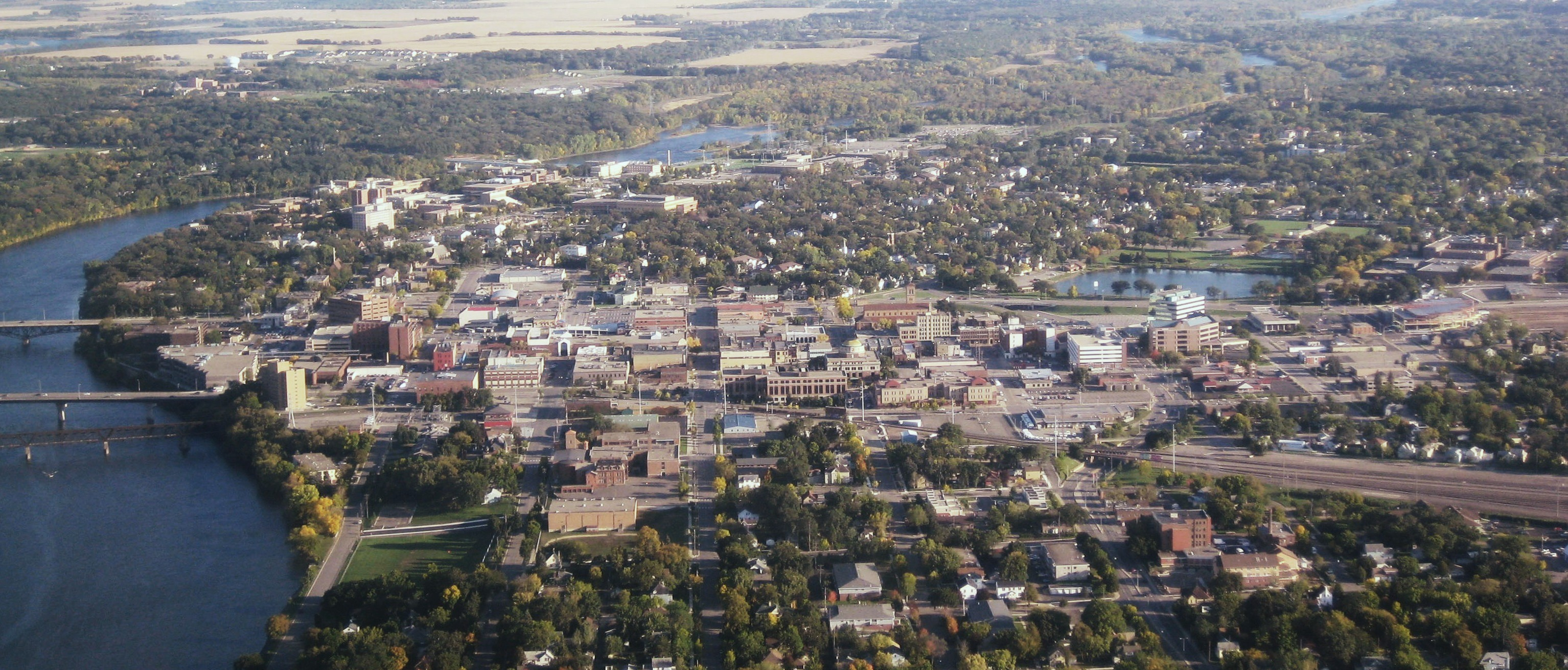
Downtown Saint Cloud, 2007

According to the United States Census Bureau, the city has an area of 41.08 square miles (106.40 km^{2}); 40.04 square miles (103.70 km^{2}) is land and 1.04 square miles (2.69 km^{2}) is water.

The city developed on both sides of the Mississippi River. Part of the Sauk River runs along its northern edge.

Just south of downtown is the 7-acre, 35-feet-deep Lake George. In 2021, the Minnesota Pollution Control Agency (MPCA) credited decade-long city investments in stormwater filtration with reducing Lake George's phosphorus levels well below the state standard. It called Lake George one of three "success stories" in the state, and planned to remove it from a list of impaired waters.

Granite bedrock quarried in the area has been estimated to be 1.7 billion years old and was exposed after several miles of rock above it eroded. The city lies on a band of modern Mississippi river sediment surrounded by land scoured several times by Wisconsin Age glaciers beginning about 35,000 years ago, ending with the Lake Superior St. Croix lobe. The later Des Moines lobe created glacial moraines and drift south and east of the city.

=== Climate ===
Climate chart for St. Cloud

St. Cloud lies in the warm summer humid continental climate zone (Köppen climate classification: Dfb), with warm summers and cold winters with moderate to heavy snowfall. The monthly normal daily mean temperature ranges from 11.6 °F (−11.3 °C) in January to 70.3 °F (21.3 °C) in July. The record high temperature is 107 °F (42 °C). The record low temperature is −43 °F (−42 °C).

Climate data for St. Cloud Regional Airport, Minnesota (1991–2020 normals, extremes 1894–present)
Month	Jan	Feb	Mar	Apr	May	Jun	Jul	Aug	Sep	Oct	Nov	Dec	Year
Record high °F (°C)	56 (13)	59 (15)	81 (27)	96 (36)	105 (41)	102 (39)	107 (42)	105 (41)	106 (41)	90 (32)	76 (24)	63 (17)	107 (42)
Mean maximum °F (°C)	41.9 (5.5)	45.1 (7.3)	61.0 (16.1)	78.1 (25.6)	88.3 (31.3)	92.4 (33.6)	92.6 (33.7)	90.8 (32.7)	87.2 (30.7)	79.3 (26.3)	59.9 (15.5)	44.4 (6.9)	95.1 (35.1)
Mean daily maximum °F (°C)	20.7 (−6.3)	25.7 (−3.5)	38.5 (3.6)	54.3 (12.4)	67.8 (19.9)	77.2 (25.1)	81.6 (27.6)	79.2 (26.2)	71.0 (21.7)	55.9 (13.3)	39.3 (4.1)	25.8 (−3.4)	53.1 (11.7)
Daily mean °F (°C)	11.8 (−11.2)	16.1 (−8.8)	29.2 (−1.6)	43.3 (6.3)	56.2 (13.4)	66.0 (18.9)	70.3 (21.3)	67.7 (19.8)	59.5 (15.3)	45.7 (7.6)	30.9 (−0.6)	17.8 (−7.9)	42.9 (6.1)
Mean daily minimum °F (°C)	2.9 (−16.2)	6.5 (−14.2)	19.8 (−6.8)	32.4 (0.2)	44.6 (7.0)	54.8 (12.7)	58.9 (14.9)	56.3 (13.5)	48.0 (8.9)	35.5 (1.9)	22.6 (−5.2)	9.8 (−12.3)	32.7 (0.4)
Mean minimum °F (°C)	−22.5 (−30.3)	−16.2 (−26.8)	−5.0 (−20.6)	16.7 (−8.5)	30.1 (−1.1)	41.3 (5.2)	47.4 (8.6)	44.3 (6.8)	31.1 (−0.5)	19.6 (−6.9)	3.2 (−16.0)	−14.8 (−26.0)	−25.1 (−31.7)
Record low °F (°C)	−43 (−42)	−40 (−40)	−32 (−36)	−3 (−19)	18 (−8)	32 (0)	40 (4)	33 (1)	18 (−8)	5 (−15)	−23 (−31)	−41 (−41)	−43 (−42)
Average precipitation inches (mm)	0.67 (17)	0.76 (19)	1.57 (40)	2.61 (66)	3.66 (93)	3.75 (95)	3.60 (91)	4.00 (102)	3.01 (76)	2.61 (66)	1.37 (35)	0.88 (22)	28.49 (724)
Average snowfall inches (cm)	8.8 (22)	8.9 (23)	8.2 (21)	4.7 (12)	0.1 (0.25)	0.0 (0.0)	0.0 (0.0)	0.0 (0.0)	0.0 (0.0)	1.0 (2.5)	6.9 (18)	9.3 (24)	47.9 (122)
Average precipitation days (≥ 0.01 in)	7.8	6.4	8.3	9.7	11.4	12.3	10.6	9.3	10.0	9.7	7.3	7.7	110.5
Average snowy days (≥ 0.1 in)	8.5	6.4	5.0	2.2	0.2	0.0	0.0	0.0	0.0	0.9	4.6	8.2	36.0
Average relative humidity (%)	70.0	66.1	67.3	65.8	62.0	67.3	67.7	69.5	73.5	68.3	73.3	75.2	68.8
Average dew point °F (°C)	−0.9 (−18.3)	4.6 (−15.2)	17.4 (−8.1)	30.6 (−0.8)	40.5 (4.7)	52.0 (11.1)	59.2 (15.1)	56.7 (13.7)	48.4 (9.1)	36.1 (2.3)	23.0 (−5.0)	12.7 (−10.7)	31.7 (−0.2)
Source: NOAA (relative humidity and dew point 1961–1990)

== Demographics ==
Historical population
Census	Pop.	Note	%±
1870	2,161		—
1880	2,462		13.9%
1890	7,686		212.2%
1900	8,663		12.7%
1910	10,600		22.4%
1920	15,873		49.7%
1930	21,000		32.3%
1940	24,173		15.1%
1950	28,410		17.5%
1960	32,415		14.1%
1970	39,691		22.4%
1980	42,566		7.2%
1990	48,812		14.7%
2000	59,108		21.1%
2010	65,842		11.4%
2020	68,881		4.6%
2025 (est.)	71,118		3.2%
U.S. Decennial Census; 2020 Census

St. Cloud has been a significant destination for immigrants throughout its history, beginning with German settlers in the late 19th century, followed by waves of Polish, Irish, and other European immigrants in the early 20th century. Since the late 20th and early 21st century, new residents of the city have predominantly been from Africa, particularly Somalia. Unofficial estimates suggest that the number of Somalis in St. Cloud and the surrounding cities could be as high as 25,000, with approximately half of these having moved to the city between 2009 and 2013. About 15% of the local school district is Somali and many Somalis are enrolled in high schools, colleges, and universities as of 2023. Homeownership among St. Cloud's Somali community is considerably lower than other populations.

Over the past two decades, the racial and ethnic landscape of St. Cloud has experienced significant changes. In the year 2000, non-Hispanic White residents made up more than 90% of the population; by 2020, their share had dropped to 67%. Black residents, who accounted for 2% of the population in 2000, were nearly 20% in 2020, marking the most significant growth among all groups. Residents of Hispanic or Latino origin also increased dramatically, nearly quadrupling their numbers over that time.

According to the U.S. Bureau of Labor Statistics, as of May 2020 the annual mean wage for 99,600 employees across all occupations in St. Cloud was $50,800. The median hourly wage was $24.42.

=== Racial and ethnic composition ===
Race/ethnicity
Race/ethnicity	2000		2010		2020	
Race/ethnicity	Number	%	Number	%	Number	%
White alone	53,857	91.12%	54,854	83.31%	46,641	67.71%
Black alone	1,378	2.33%	5,101	7.75%	13,180	19.13%
Native American alone	402	0.68%	398	0.61%	337	0.49%
Asian alone	1,833	3.10%	2,393	3.64%	2,404	3.49%
Pacific Islander alone	31	0.05%	16	0.03%	51	0.07%
Other race alone	60	0.10%	54	0.08%	314	0.46%
Two or more races	762	1.29%	1,429	2.17%	2,116	3.07%
Hispanic or Latino	784	1.33%	1,597	2.43%	2,838	4.12%
Total	59,107	100.00%	65,842	100.00%	68,881	100.00%

=== 2020 census ===
As of the 2020 census, St. Cloud had a population of 68,881. The median age was 32.6 years. 22.5% of residents were under the age of 18 and 14.3% of residents were 65 years of age or older. For every 100 females there were 101.9 males, and for every 100 females age 18 and over there were 100.8 males age 18 and over.

98.3% of residents lived in urban areas, while 1.7% lived in rural areas.

There were 27,481 households in St. Cloud, of which 25.7% had children under the age of 18 living in them. Of all households, 36.3% were married-couple households, 24.4% were households with a male householder and no spouse or partner present, and 30.0% were households with a female householder and no spouse or partner present. About 34.0% of all households were made up of individuals and 10.1% had someone living alone who was 65 years of age or older.

There were 29,215 housing units, of which 5.9% were vacant. The homeowner vacancy rate was 1.4% and the rental vacancy rate was 6.9%.

Racial composition as of the 2020 census
Race	Number	Percent
White	47,421	68.8%
Black or African American	13,246	19.2%
American Indian and Alaska Native	428	0.6%
Asian	2,416	3.5%
Native Hawaiian and Other Pacific Islander	54	0.1%
Some other race	1,309	1.9%
Two or more races	4,007	5.8%
Hispanic or Latino (of any race)	2,838	4.1%

=== 2010 census ===
As of the census of 2010, there were 65,842 people, 25,439 households, and 13,348 families residing in the city. The population density was 1,644.4 inhabitants per square mile (634.9/km^{2}). There were 27,338 housing units at an average density of 682.8 per square mile (263.6/km^{2}). The racial makeup of the city was 84.6% White, 7.8% African American, 0.7% Native American, 3.7% Asian, 0.8% from other races, and 2.5% from two or more races. Hispanic or Latino residents of any race were 2.4% of the population.

There were 25,439 households, of which 25.0% had children under the age of 18 living with them, 37.6% were married couples living together, 10.4% had a female householder with no husband present, 4.5% had a male householder with no wife present, and 47.5% were non-families. 30.8% of all households were made up of individuals, and 7.8% had someone living alone who was 65 years of age or older. The average household size was 2.37 and the average family size was 2.95.

The median age in the city was 28.8 years. 18.9% of residents were under the age of 18; 23.9% were between the ages of 18 and 24; 25.5% were from 25 to 44; 21.5% were from 45 to 64; and 10.3% were 65 years of age or older. The gender makeup of the city was 51.5% male and 48.5% female.

=== 2000 census ===
As of the census of 2000, 27.3% of St. Cloud households had children under the age of 18 living with them, 41.4% were married couples living together, 9.4% had a female householder with no husband present, and 45.9% were non-families. 30.2% of all households were made up of individuals, and 8.0% had someone living alone who was 65 years of age or older. The average household size was 2.40 and the average family size was 3.00.

The racial makeup of the city was 91.7% White, 2.4% African American, 0.7% Native American, 3.1% Asian, 0.7% other races, and 1.4% from two or more races. Hispanic or Latino of any race were 1.3% of the population.

== Economy ==
According to the 2024 City of St. Cloud Economic Development Authority Employment Report, the city's top employers are:

#	Employer	# of Employees
1	CentraCare Health System St. Cloud Hospital	6,121
2	State of Minnesota / St. Cloud State University	1,961
3	St. Cloud VA Health Care System	1,749
4	St. Cloud School District	1,247
5	New Flyer of America Inc.	887
6	Anderson Trucking	682
7	Stearns County	648
8	Essilor of America	580
9	Coborn's Inc	545
10	City of St. Cloud	473

St. Cloud Hospital, part of CentraCare Health, was founded in 1886 as St. Benedict's Hospital. The regional health system also includes six Critical Access hospitals, Rice Memorial Hospital in Willmar, and numerous outreach and outpatient clinics and services.

Retail options in St. Cloud include Midtown Square Mall, which features more than 50 tenants, and Crossroads Center, a larger shopping complex with over 100 stores and services.

== Arts and culture ==
St. Cloud is home to a variety of notable sites and institutions that reflect its cultural and recreational significance. The St. Cloud Area Convention and Visitors Bureau promotes an area events calendar, dining and lodging information. The city-owned St. Cloud River's Edge Convention Center hosts a variety of events including regional conferences, consumer/trade shows, small group meetings and social events.

The Cathedral of Saint Mary is the largest church in the area. Constructed in the 1920s in the Italian Romanesque style, it serves as the mother church of the Roman Catholic Diocese of Saint Cloud. The St. Cloud Commercial Historic District is listed on the National Register of Historic Places. St. Cloud is a Preserve America Community. The Paramount Theatre and Visual Arts Center, a restored 706-seat venue built in 1921, serves as a focal point for performing and visual arts in the region.

The Great River Regional Library serves a six-county area and 32 communities. This expansive system houses nearly one million items—including books, CDs, and DVDs—and provides 250 public computers. It also hosts a wide array of public programs and events. The Stearns History Museum, accredited by the American Alliance of Museums, offers two floors of exhibits, a research area, a museum store, and is situated within a 100-acre nature park. Munsinger Gardens and Clemens Gardens features extensive floral displays that date back to the 1930s. The Minnesota Amateur Baseball Hall of Fame is dedicated to preserving and celebrating the state's history in amateur baseball.

== Sports ==
The city is home to:

- the St. Cloud State University Division I ice hockey teams. Men's Husky Hockey competes in the National Collegiate Hockey Conference. Women's Husky Hockey competes in the Western Collegiate Hockey Association. The men's team has made nine NCAA Men's Ice Hockey Championship appearances, notably advancing to the 2021 championship game in Pittsburgh, Penn. The 2012–13 team's co-captain and fifth-year forward, Drew LeBlanc, was named WCHA Player of the Year and earned numerous national honors, including the Hobey Baker Award, the most prestigious award in men's college hockey. The 2013 team also earned a share of the WCHA league title and its symbol, the century-old MacNaughton Cup. The Huskies play in the 5,763-seat Herb Brooks National Hockey Center, which underwent a $18 million renovation and expansion in 2012–13.
- the St. Cloud Norsemen, a Tier II junior hockey team at the Municipal Athletic Complex.
- the Granite City Lumberjacks, a Tier III junior hockey team in nearby Sauk Rapids.
- the St. Cloud Rox (formerly the River Bats) of the Northwoods League, a collegiate summer baseball league. The Rox play at Joe Faber Field in St. Cloud and were founded in 2012.
- the Saint Cloud Area Roller Dolls, a flat-track roller derby league founded in 2011.
- the Saint Cloud River Runners club, who put on the Lake Wobegon Trail Marathon, an annual event in central Minnesota. The race is used as a Boston-qualifying event for runners who want a straight, quiet, scenic, mostly flat route in the early spring.
- the Granite City FC is a minor league soccer team founded in 2016. It currently plays in the United Premier Soccer League (UPSL).

== Parks and recreation ==
The city maintains 95 parks, totaling more than 1,400 acres (5.7 km^{2}) and ranging in size from 80 acres (0.32 km^{2}) "neighborhood and mini parks" to 243 acres (0.98 km^{2}). The largest developed park, Whitney Memorial Park, is the former location of the city airport. It features a recreation center for senior citizens, a dog park, and numerous softball, baseball, and soccer fields.

Central Park, St Cloud, Minnesota in the early 20th century

== Government ==
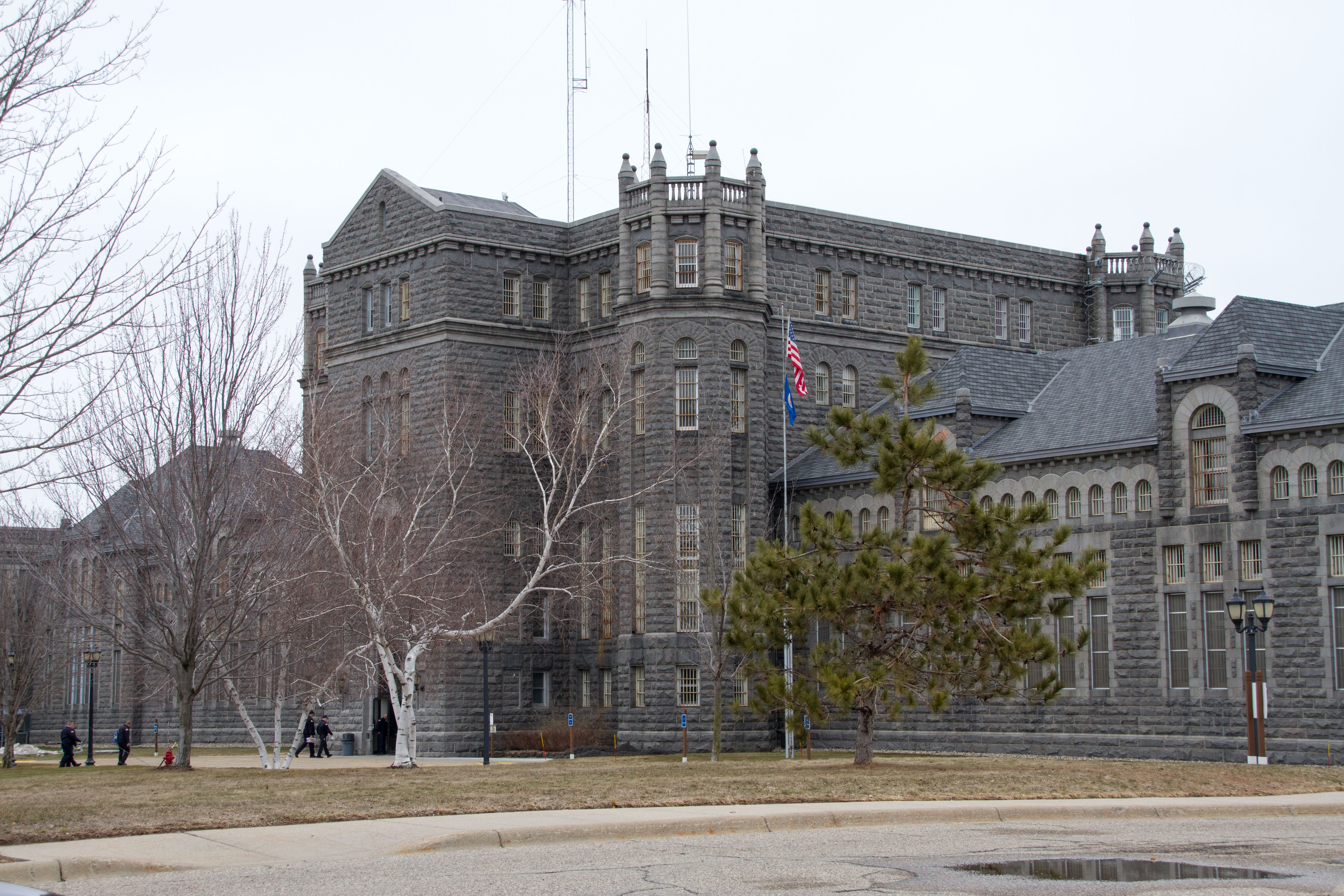
Minnesota Correctional Facility – St. Cloud

Since 2025, St. Cloud's mayor has been Jake Anderson. The Minnesota Correctional Facility – St. Cloud, built in 1889, houses nearly 1,000 prisoners.

St. Cloud has been moved by congressional redistricting to a wide variety of Minnesota regions, including northern, south central, northwest and southwest. In Congressional district maps in effect since 2003, it has been grouped with rural areas and suburbs north and west of the Twin Cities. The district had only minor changes in a 2022 map drawn by a five-judge panel based on the 2020 census. As of the 2020 census, the city of St. Cloud is the second largest in Minnesota's 6th congressional district, represented by Republican Tom Emmer. The St. Cloud, Minnesota metropolitan area that includes adjacent communities has about a quarter of the 6th district population, though some of the area lies outside the district.

The city makes up the majority of the population of Minnesota State Senate District 14, which straddles the Mississippi River and includes parts of three counties, represented by Aric Putnam. Minnesota House District 14A includes generally western parts of the city as well as Waite Park, St. Augusta and adjacent rural areas, represented by Bernie Perryman. District 14B includes east central and northeast St. Cloud, neighboring Sauk Rapids and parts of rural Benton and Sherburne Counties, represented by Dan Wolgamott.

In 2016, St. Cloud converted from 5% to 80% renewable energy by using solar gardens, street light improvements, bio-gas, and other energy efficiency initiatives. St. Cloud's wastewater plant converts sugar-laden liquids from local food and beer manufacturers into fuel and fertilizer. Since 2020, the city has produced more energy than it consumes.

=== Politics ===
Kamala Harris won St. Cloud in the 2024 presidential election, defeating Donald Trump, 48.69% to 46.64%. Trump's share of the city's vote was similar to his performance statewide. Harris's share of the city's vote was about two percentage points lower than her statewide performance. Joe Biden won St. Cloud in the 2020 presidential election by a margin of 9%, higher than his statewide margin of 7.12%. In 2016, Trump won St. Cloud by 1.75% over Democratic nominee Hillary Clinton.

Presidential election results 1960–2024

Precinct General Election Results
Year	Republican	Democratic	Third parties
2024	47.5% 15,238	49.6% 15,908	2.9% 919
2020	43.9% 14,209	52.9% 17,149	3.2% 1,036
2016	45.7% 14,401	44.0% 13,850	10.3% 3,254
2012	44.5% 14,295	52.3% 16,835	3.2% 1,032
2008	43.9% 14,505	53.6% 17,688	2.5% 839
2004	46.9% 14,909	51.5% 16,394	1.6% 506
2000	43.9% 11,647	45.0% 11,958	11.1% 2,941
1996	38.0% 8,565	49.6% 11,169	12.4% 2,783
1992	34.9% 9,527	41.5% 11,331	23.6% 6,422
1988	46.1% 9,251	53.9% 10,823	0.0% 0
1984	51.0% 10,598	49.0% 10,189	0.0% 0
1980	42.4% 8,702	46.3% 9,487	11.3% 2,236
1976	40.1% 8,045	55.7% 11,176	4.2% 845
1972	43.0% 6,512	52.7% 7,970	4.3% 646
1968	40.6% 5,389	55.5% 7,378	3.9% 515
1964	36.4% 4,872	63.1% 8,439	0.5% 66
1960	41.5% 5,391	58.4% 7,589	0.1% 8

== Education ==
Primary home languages of St. Cloud Public School students
1. English (62.5%)
2. Somali (27.9%)
3. Spanish (4.50%)
4. Vietnamese (0.78%)
5. Other languages (4.30%)

Almost all of St. Cloud, including the portions in Stearns and Sherburne Counties, and much of the portion in Benton County, is in the St. Cloud Area School District. Part of the Benton County portion is in the Sauk Rapids-Rice Public Schools district.

The St. Cloud Area School District serves St. Cloud, St. Augusta, Clearwater, Waite Park, St. Joseph, Haven Township, and parts of Sauk Rapids. It has eight elementary schools, a new K-8 school in St. Joseph, and two major public high schools, St. Cloud Technical High School and St. Cloud Apollo High School. St. Cloud also has a major private high school, Cathedral High School. Both public high schools offer a broad selection of Advanced Placement courses and rank high in the state in the number of AP tests taken and of test takers. St. Cloud Tech opened in 1917 across from a city park and Lake George. In 2019, it moved to a new 69-acre, $104 million facility on the southwest edge of the city. The historic 1917 building has been acquired for use by city government. Apollo opened in 1970 and serves the expanding north side of the city. Other high schools and secondary schools that serve St. Cloud include St. Robert Bellarmine's Academy, St. Cloud Christian School, Immaculate Conception Academy, St. John's Preparatory School, St. Cloud Alternative Learning Center, and the charter school STRIDE Academy, which is K-8. The nearby cities of Sauk Rapids and Sartell also have their own school districts and high schools, bringing the number of public high schools in the metropolitan area to four.

=== Colleges ===
St. Cloud is home to several higher education institutions, including Minnesota's third-largest university, St. Cloud State University. St. Cloud State's fall 2020 enrollment was 12,607, in a year affected by the COVID-19 pandemic.

St. Cloud's other post-secondary institutions and campuses include St. Cloud Technical and Community College (SCTCC) and Rasmussen College. Neighboring Sartell is home to a campus of the Duluth-based College of St. Scholastica, and the College of St. Benedict and St. John's University are in neighboring St. Joseph and nearby Collegeville, respectively.

== Media ==
St. Cloud's main newspaper is St. Cloud LIVE, a weekly founded in February 2023. Its offices are in the old Davidson Opera House in downtown St. Cloud. St. Cloud LIVE's focus is reporting on news in St. Cloud, Sartell, Sauk Rapids, Waite Park, St. Joseph, and elsewhere within a 30-mile radius.

St. Cloud is part of the Twin Cities television market. One full-power station, the Ion-owned KPXM-TV (channel 41), is licensed to the city, but moved its transmitter to the Twin Cities in 2009 as part of the digital transition, and maintains no presence in the city. WCMN-LD (channel 13) is a low-power station licensed to St. Cloud that broadcasts in ATSC 3.0. Additionally, St. Cloud State University students operate cable-only UTVS (channel 180), which includes local news and broadcasts from a studio on campus.

Radio stations include:

=== FM ===
FM radio stations
Frequency	Call sign	Name	Format	Owner
88.1; 88.1 HD-2	KVSC	Radio X	College Radio; Alternative Rock	St. Cloud State University
88.9; 88.9 HD-2	KNSR	MPR News; 89.3 The Current	Public Radio; Adult Album Alternative	Minnesota Public Radio
89.5	K208DV (KLRD-FM Translator)	Air 1	Contemporary Christian	Educational Media Foundation
90.1	KSJR	Classical MPR	Classical	Minnesota Public Radio
91.5	KCFB (KTIG-FM Simulcast)		Christian	Minnesota Christian Broadcasters
92.9	KKJM	Spirit 92.9	Contemporary Christian	Gabriel Media
93.5	K228FV (KYES-AM Translator)	Relevant Radio	Catholic	Gabriel Media
93.9	W230DG (KXSS-AM Translator)	1390 Granite City Sports	Sports	Townsquare Media
94.3	K232GA (WXYG-AM Translator)	Album Rock 540	Classic rock	Tri-County Broadcasting
94.9	KMXK	Mix 94.9	Adult Contemporary	Townsquare Media
95.3	W237EU (WJON-AM Translator)		News/Talk	Townsquare Media
95.7	W239CU (WBHR-AM Translator)	The Bear	Sports	Tri-County Broadcasting
96.1	WROJ (LPFM)	The Rock FM	Contemporary Christian	The Rock FM Communications, Inc.
96.7	KZRV	The River	Classic Hits	Townsquare Media
97.5	KVEX (LPFM)	RadioX	Alternative Rock	St. Cloud State University
98.1	WWJO	98-1 Minnesota's New Country	Country	Townsquare Media
98.9; 98.9 HD-2; 98.9 HD-3	KZPK	Wild Country 99; KNSI; Z-Rock 103.3	Country; News/Talk; Classic Rock	Leighton Broadcasting
99.3	K257GK (KNSI-AM Translator)	KNSI	News/Talk	Leighton Broadcasting
99.9	KCML	99.9 Lite FM	Adult Contemporary	Leighton Broadcasting
101.1	W266DT (WMIN-AM Translator)	Uptown 1010	Adult Standards	Tri-County Broadcasting
101.7; 101.7 HD-2; 101.7 HD-3; 101.7 HD-4	WHMH	Rockin' 101; Album Rock 540; 106.5 The Point; Uptown 1010	Active Rock; Classic rock Alternative; Adult Standards	Tri-County Broadcasting
102.3	W232EG (WVAL-AM Translator)		Classic Country	Tri-County Broadcasting
103.3	K277BS (KZPK HD-3 Translator)	Z-Rock 103.3	Classic rock	Leighton Broadcasting
103.7	KLZZ	The Loon	Classic rock	Townsquare Media
104.7	KCLD		Top 40	Leighton Broadcasting
105.1	KZYS (LPFM)		Somalian	Saint Cloud Area Somali Salvation Organization
106.5	W293CS (WHMH HD-3 Translator)	106.5 The Point	Alternative	Tri-County Broadcasting
107.3	W297BO (WXYG-AM Translator)	Album Rock 540	Classic rock	Tri-County Broadcasting

=== AM ===
AM radio stations
Frequency	Call sign	Name	Format	Owner
540 AM	WXYG	The Goat	Classic rock	Tri-County Broadcasting
660 AM	WBHR	The Bear	Sports	Tri-County Broadcasting
800 AM	WVAL		Classic Country	Tri-County Broadcasting
1010 AM	WMIN	Uptown 1010	Adult Standards	Tri-County Broadcasting
1180 AM	KYES	Relevant Radio	Catholic	Gabriel Media
1240 AM	WJON		News/Talk	Townsquare Media
1390 AM	KXSS	1390 Granite City Sports	Sports	Townsquare Media
1450 AM	KNSI		News/Talk	Leighton Broadcasting

== Transportation ==
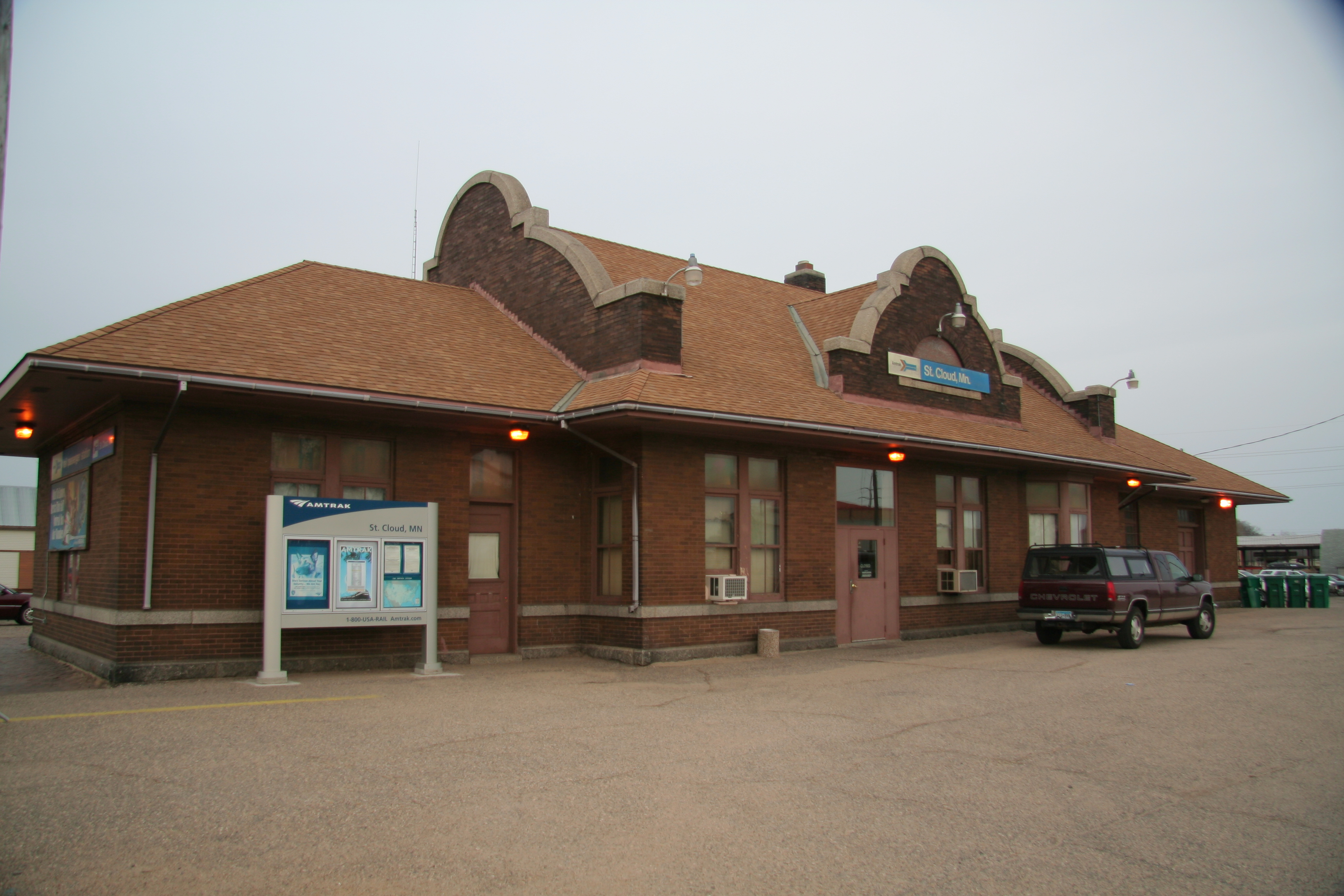
St. Cloud station

St. Cloud is a regional transportation hub within Minnesota. Major roadways including Interstate 94, U.S. Highway 10, and Minnesota State Highways 15 and 23 pass through the city.

Bus service within the city and to neighboring Sartell, Sauk Rapids, and Waite Park is offered through St. Cloud Metro Bus, which was recognized in 2007 as the best transit system of its size in North America. The system gives transit buses a slight advantage at stoplights in order to improve efficiency and on-time performance. The Metro Bus Transit Center in the downtown area is also shared with Jefferson Lines, providing national bus service.

Until the Northstar Line closed in 2026, the Northstar Link Commuter Bus linked downtown St. Cloud and St. Cloud State University, with the western terminus of the line in Big Lake.

Several rail lines run through the city, which is a stop on Amtrak's Empire Builder passenger rail line.

St. Cloud is home to St. Cloud Regional Airport, from which daily connecting flights to Minneapolis–Saint Paul International Airport were made on Delta Connection, operated by Mesaba Airlines, until January 1, 2010, when the service was discontinued. On December 15, 2012, Allegiant Air began nonstop flights between St. Cloud Regional Airport and Phoenix-Mesa Gateway Airport, on Airbus 319 aircraft.

=== Major highways ===
- Interstate 94
- U.S. Highway 10
- Minnesota State Highway 15
- Minnesota State Highway 23

== Notable people ==
- Halima Aden, model and first Somali-American to compete for Miss Minnesota
- Mathew Ahmann, civil rights activist
- George Annas, Boston University Professor and Director of the Center for Health Law, Ethics & Human Rights
- Raymond H. Bares, Minnesota state senator and educator
- Tom Burgmeier, Major League Baseball player; grew up in St. Cloud and attended Cathedral High School
- Loren W. Collins, Minnesota jurist and legislator; mayor of St. Cloud
- David Durenberger, U.S. senator from Minnesota
- Jim Eisenreich, MLB player
- Janice Ettle, middle-distance and long-distance runner
- Jim Fahnhorst, NFL player
- Keith Fahnhorst, NFL player
- Howard M. Fish, retired U.S. Air Force lieutenant general, former assistant vice chief of staff of Air Force
- Charles A. Gilman, ninth lieutenant governor of Minnesota
- Janey Gohl, 1978 Miss Minnesota USA
- Joel Gretsch, actor
- Lawrence M. Hall, longest-serving Speaker of the Minnesota House of Representatives
- Keith F. Hughes, Minnesota state senator and lawyer
- Jack I. Kleinbaum, businessman, St. Cloud City Council member, and Minnesota state legislator
- Dave Kleis, mayor of St. Cloud
- Jim Knoblach, Republican member of the Minnesota House of Representatives
- Franklin J. Knoll, Minnesota state legislator, lawyer, and judge
- June Marlowe, actress notable for playing Miss Crabtree in short-film series Our Gang
- John McMartin, film, television and stage actor
- Stephen Miller, abolitionist, Civil War veteran, Republican politician, fourth governor of Minnesota
- Edgar G. Mills, Wisconsin state assemblyman and senator
- William P. Murphy, associate justice of Minnesota Supreme Court
- Jim Pehler, Minnesota state legislator
- Tom Petters, former CEO and chair of Petters Group Worldwide
- Reynold Philipsek, gypsy jazz guitarist
- Dewey H. Reed, educator and politician
- Michael Sauer, NHL player
- Anne Schleper, women's hockey Olympic silver medalist, 2014
- Nate Schmidt, NHL player
- Stephen Sommers, film director, alumnus of Cathedral High School and St. John's University
- Charles Thomas Stearns, politician
- Jane Swisshelm, newspaper owner, editor and abolitionist
- Gene Waldorf, electrical engineer and politician
- Alise Willoughby, BMX racer and Olympic silver medalist.
- Nate Wolters, professional basketball player
- Gig Young, Academy Award-winning actor, film and television star; born in St. Cloud

== Sister cities ==
- Spalt, Bavaria, Germany
- Akita, Japan
- Saint-Cloud, Ile-de-France, France

== In popular culture ==
- Courtroom scenes in the Disney Film The Mighty Ducks were filmed in St. Cloud, and a few scenes were filmed at the Municipal Athletic Complex (MAC) but did not make the final film.
- Al Franken and Tom Davis's One More Saturday Night is set in St. Cloud, but was not filmed there.
- The movie Juno was partially set in St. Cloud, which is referred to as "East Jesus Nowhere", though no filming took place in the city.
- The 1989 drag-racing film Catch Me If You Can, directed by Stephen Sommers, was both set and filmed in St. Cloud.
- Marshall Eriksen, one of the main characters in the sitcom How I Met Your Mother, was born and raised in St. Cloud. Many scenes detailing his childhood, as well as later visits to his hometown, are set in St. Cloud, though no filming occurred there.

== See also ==
- 1998 St. Cloud explosion
- Dave Torrey Arena
