= KVEX-LP =

- Saint Cloud, Minnesota; United States
- Broadcast area: Saint Cloud; Sauk Rapids
- Frequency: 97.5 MHz
- Branding: RadioX

Programming
- Format: Classic alternative rock

Ownership
- Owner: St. Cloud State University
- Sister stations: KVSC

History
- First air date: January 12, 2016

Technical information
- Licensing authority: FCC
- Facility ID: 194754
- Class: L1
- ERP: 45 watts
- HAAT: 44.4 meters (146 ft)
- Transmitter coordinates: 45°33′17.0″N 94°09′0.0″W
- Repeater: KVSC-HD2

Links
- Public license information: LMS
- Webcast: Listen live
- Website: 975radiox.com

KVEX-LP is a Classic Alternative Rock formatted low-power broadcast radio station licensed to Saint Cloud, Minnesota, serving Saint Cloud and Sauk Rapids in Minnesota. KVEX-LP is owned and operated by St. Cloud State University.

The station's transmitter is located atop Sherburne Hall on campus, shared with KZYS-LP.

== History ==
The station launched on January 12, 2015, a collaboration with KVSC. It was created from scratch by a 2011 high school graduate from Hutchinson, Minnesota. KVEX is entirely student-run, like most College radio stations. With 45 watts, the station's general range is 9 miles (14 km). The station's general intent is to fill a hole in programming in the St. Cloud radio market, with alternative rock programming.
