= Munsinger Gardens and Clemens Gardens =

Gardens in St. Cloud, Minnesota, United States

Coordinates: 45.5504°N 94.1442°W

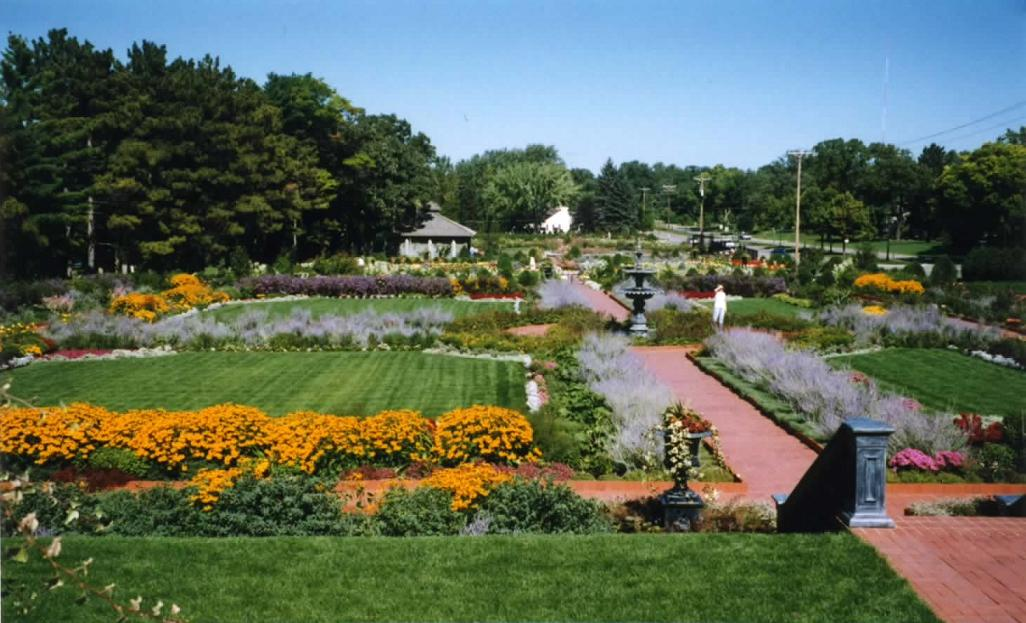
- Clemens Gardens
- Interactive map of Munsinger Gardens and Clemens Gardens

Munsinger Gardens (14 acres) and Clemens Gardens (7 acres) are two distinct but adjacent gardens on the banks of the Mississippi River northwest of the intersection of University Drive SE and Kilian Blvd SE, and along the southernmost portion of Riverside Drive SE, in St. Cloud, Minnesota. The gardens are open every day from 6:00 a.m. to 10.00 p.m., spring to fall. There is no admission fee.

Munsinger Gardens are informal with winding flower-bordered paths under tall pines, and date from 1915 when the city purchased the former site of a sawmill as a park. The gardens themselves were constructed primarily in the 1930s by the Works Progress Administration. Projects from this period included planting trees and flowerbeds, and building rock-lined paths, a lily pond, and a fountain. The first greenhouse was built in 1938; it has subsequently been replaced. The gardens were refurbished and expanded in the 1980s.

The Clemens Gardens were developed primarily in the 1990s by Bill and Virginia Clemens, who then donated them to the City of St. Cloud. They include six gardens in a formal European style with American plantings and fountains:

- Formal Garden (1986) - flowers with fountain.
- Perennial Garden - perennials hardy to Minnesota winters, with a 12-foot (3.7 m) high, cast iron replica of a pre-Civil War fountain patterned after the original in Columbus, Georgia.
- Rest Area Garden - clematis and rose vines, with one of the tallest outdoor fountains in Minnesota.
- Treillage Garden - an arbor trellis (104 feet long, with central dome 24 feet (7.3 m) high), with fountain under the dome, surrounded by four single-color gardens.
- Virginia Clemens Rose Garden (1990) - 1,100 roses including floribundas, tree roses, hybrid teas, shrub roses, and grandifloras.
- White Garden (1994) - inspired by the Sissinghurst Castle garden.

== See also ==
- List of botanical gardens in the United States
