= WVAL =

- Sauk Rapids, Minnesota; United States
- Broadcast area: St. Cloud, Minnesota
- Frequency: 800 kHz
- Branding: FM 102.3 & AM 800 WVAL

Programming
- Format: Classic country

Ownership
- Owner: Tri-County Broadcasting
- Sister stations: WBHR, WHMH-FM, WMIN, WXYG

History
- First air date: March 29, 1999
- Call sign meaning: Named for owner's wife, Val

Technical information
- Licensing authority: FCC
- Facility ID: 78914
- Class: B
- Power: 2,600 watts day 850 watts night
- Transmitter coordinates: 45°36′17.9″N 94°08′22″W
- Translator: 102.3 W272EG (Sauk Rapids)

Links
- Public license information: Public file; LMS
- Webcast: Listen Live
- Website: 800wval.com

WVAL (800 AM) is a radio station serving St. Cloud, Minnesota airing a classic country format. The station is owned by Tri-County Broadcasting. WVAL first aired in 1963, went on hiatus in the early 1980s, returning to the airwaves in 1999. The station shares AM towers with its three other sister stations, WMIN, WBHR, and WXYG. There are seven total towers. The call sign is based on owner Herb Hoppe's wife Val.

== History ==
WVAL-AM received its initial construction permit from the Federal Communications Commission on July 2, 1962. The project was led by Herb Hoppe, a New Munich native and former dairy farmer. WVAL-AM originally signed on the air on August 3, 1963, as a 250-watt daytimer licensed to Sauk Rapids. Hoppe was a self-taught broadcaster who named the station after his wife, Val. To hedge against potential financial failure, Hoppe designed the station's original studios, known locally as "The Red House," to be convertible into a residential home. In its first decade, WVAL became the dominant country music outlet in Central Minnesota. Hoppe was known for a "hands-on" management style, which included climbing the station's 300-foot tower himself to change lightbulbs and personally promoting local concerts featuring stars like Dolly Parton and Porter Wagoner. In 1986, the station migrated from 800 kHz to 660 kHz to take advantage of new "clear channel" rules that allowed for a power increase to 10,000 watts. WVAL made its return to the 800 kHz frequency on March 29, 1999. This was made possible by relaxed FCC ownership rules, allowing Tri-County Broadcasting to hold multiple AM licenses in the same market. Upon its return, the station resumed its heritage "Classic Country" format. WVAL is part of a rare engineering arrangement known as a "Quadplex.". The other three stations are WXYG, WBHR, and WMIN.

Designed by engineer Mark Mueller, the system uses complex filtering and "reject" circuitry to allow four high-power signals to utilize the same physical towers simultaneously without interference. WVAL specifically operates with 2,600 watts during the day and 850 watts at night using a directional pattern.

Herb Hoppe remained active in the station's operations until his health declined. He died on March 28, 2018, at the age of 83.

Logo before translator sign on
