= WBHR =

Radio station in St. Cloud, Minnesota

- Sauk Rapids, Minnesota; United States
- Broadcast area: St. Cloud, Minnesota
- Frequency: 660 kHz
- Branding: 660 The Bear

Programming
- Format: Sports
- Affiliations: ESPN Radio; Chicago Cubs Radio Network; Las Vegas Raiders Radio Network

Ownership
- Owner: Tri-County Broadcasting
- Sister stations: WHMH-FM, WMIN, WVAL, WXYG

History
- First air date: August 3, 1963
- Former call signs: WVAL (1963–1998)
- Former frequencies: 800 kHz (1963–1986)

Technical information
- Licensing authority: FCC
- Facility ID: 26980
- Class: B
- Power: 10,000 watts day 500 watts night
- Transmitter coordinates: 45°36′18″N 94°08′21″W
- Translator: 95.7 W239CU (Sauk Rapids)

Links
- Public license information: Public file; LMS
- Webcast: Listen Live
- Website: 660wbhr.com

WBHR (660 kHz) is a commercial AM radio station licensed to Sauk Rapids, Minnesota, and serving the St. Cloud area. The station is owned by Tri-County Broadcasting and broadcasts a sports format as a network affiliate of ESPN Radio and the Chicago Cubs Radio Network. It is the only station in Minnesota to broadcast both Chicago Cubs and Las Vegas Raiders games.

By day, the station is powered at 10,000 watts. Because 660 AM is a clear channel frequency reserved for Class A WFAN New York City, WBHR reduces power to 500 watts at night to avoid interference. The station uses a directional antenna at all times, and their transmitter array is located on 10th Avenue NE near Golden Spike Road in Sauk Rapids. It shares a seven-tower array with its three other AM sister stations. Programming is also heard on 250 watt FM translator W239CU at 95.7 MHz.

== History ==
=== Construction ===
On July 2, 1962, the Tri-County Broadcasting Company, owned by Carl A. Nierengarten and Herb Hoppe, received a construction permit from the Federal Communications Commission (FCC). It authorized Tri-County to build a new radio station on 800 kHz in Sauk Rapids, to broadcast with 250 watts as a daytimer. Despite obtaining the permit, objections arose from the city of St. Cloud and from aviation interests to the proposed tower site, a mile from the local airport. It was criticized as too close to the northeast runway approach.

Nierengarten bowed out of the company before the station took to the air. Hoppe, unsure of how the venture would turn out, designed the radio station studio building, a former barn, to be convertible to a house, in case the business failed. WVAL was named for Herb's wife Val, then pregnant with her fifth child. On August 3, 1963, the station signed on the air. The night before, Hoppe had received operating authority from the FCC; he scrambled to gather enough records to program the station.

=== Country music ===
Hoppe was intimately involved in the day-to-day operations of WVAL, which played country music. He sometimes changed the lights on the 300-foot (91 m) mast himself. He also sold ad time, served as a disc jockey and hosted concerts headlined by such artists as Dolly Parton and Porter Wagoner.

WVAL and its country music format were number one in the St. Cloud area for several years in the early 1970s. In 1975, the station added a new adult contemporary-formatted FM outlet, 101.7 WHMH-FM.

=== Move to 660 AM ===
The 1980s were a decade of two significant changes for WVAL, motivated by a desire to improve its coverage area. In 1979, WVAL was approved for a power increase to 2,500 watts. Then three years later, after the FCC opted to break down several clear channel frequencies, Hoppe filed to move the station to 660 kHz to allow for an additional signal boost.

The Tri-County stations were also struggling in the local ratings, ranking near the back of the pack in the market. WVAL won the right to relocate to 660 kHz, beating out competitor WJON. The move was made in 1986 and allowed the station to increase its daytime power to 10,000 watts and begin nighttime service at 250 watts.

=== Oldies and Radio Disney ===
Even as the frequency change was pending, low ratings prompted a format change, and for Hoppe, so did the increasing "modernization" of country music and increasing competition in the country format. On April 1, 1984, the station became oldies "W-GOLD". The oldies format lasted seven years before WHMH-FM's rock was simulcast on the AM frequency in 1991.

In 1998, the call letters on 660 were changed to WBHR, in preparation for the revival of WVAL and the 800 frequency on a new license in 1999. On March 28 of that year, the station became an affiliate of the Radio Disney children's music network, with a contemporary hit radio & oldies. Radio Disney lasted for three years.

=== Sports radio ===
The station flipped to sports radio in 2001, initially using programming from Fox Sports Radio. When WJON dropped ESPN Radio in 2003, Hoppe moved to switch WBHR to that network.

In addition to its national programming, WBHR became the home of Saint John's University athletics in 2006.

After suffering from blood cancer, Hoppe died in 2018.

== Signal ==
WBHR broadcasts with a power of 10,000 watts during the daytime hours utilizing a tower array of 2 towers and a power of 500 watts during the nighttime hours utilizing a tower array of 3 towers. The station's daytime signal reaches 4 states, providing at least Grade B (fringe) coverage to the Twin Cities, as well as locations such as Wadena, Alexandria, Detroit Lakes, Bemidji, and Duluth, as far west as Milbank, and New Effington in South Dakota and Wahpeton, and Fairmount in North Dakota and as far east as Menomonie, Cedar Falls, Bennett, and Superior in Wisconsin. The nighttime signal of WBHR is a cardoid-type pattern aimed mostly to the west with a deep null to the east, blanketing locations such as Holdingford, Sauk Centre, and Belgrade but only as far east as Big Lake.
