= Great River Regional Library =

Coordinates: 45.556817°N 94.166591°W

- Location: Central Minnesota
- Type: Public library
- Established: September 25, 1969
- Branches: 32

Collection
- Size: 850,000 items in catalog (in 2017)

Access and use
- Circulation: 2,455,176 items checked out in 2022

Other information
- Director: Karen Pundsack
- Employees: 243 (in 2022)
- Website: www.griver.org

Great River Regional Library is a library system serving Benton, Morrison, Sherburne, Stearns, Todd and Wright Counties in central Minnesota. It is a consolidated library system consisting of 32 branch libraries, with a headquarters at the St. Cloud Public Library.

== History ==
When the hotel which contained St. Cloud's reading room burned down in 1901, the community sought funding from industrialist and philanthropist Andrew Carnegie to build a library. They received $25,000 from Carnegie, along with an additional $2,000 from local railroad executive James J. Hill, and the St. Cloud Public Library opened in 1902. In 1969 the library expanded services to become the Great River Regional Library system. The current St. Cloud Public Library was built in 2008.

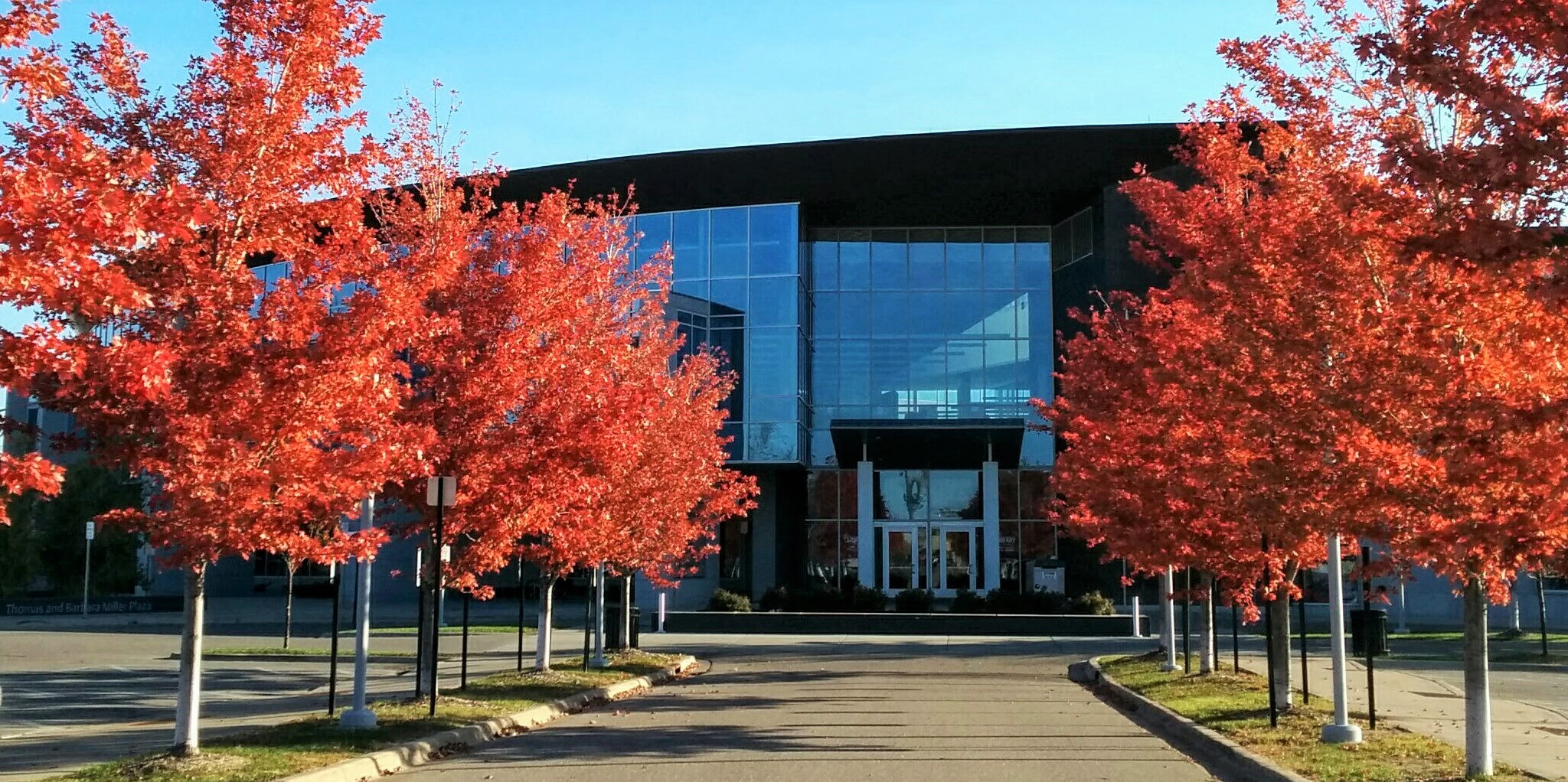
St. Cloud Public Library facade

== Locations ==
Branch libraries are located in the following cities: Albany, Annandale, Becker, Belgrade, Big Lake, Buffalo, Clearwater, Cokato, Cold Spring, Delano, Eagle Bend, Elk River, Foley, Grey Eagle, Howard Lake, Kimball, Little Falls, Long Prairie, Melrose, Monticello, Paynesville, Pierz, Richmond, Rockford, Royalton, St. Cloud, St. Michael, Sauk Centre, Staples, Swanville, Upsala, and Waite Park.

== Services ==
=== Digital collections and programs ===
The Great River Regional Library (GRRL) website provides access to the library's catalog, digital collections, research databases, as well as information about free programs and events.

The library's catalog contains over 300,000 books and over 500,000 items total throughout the library's system. Nearly half of all books in the library's collection reside in the Saint Cloud building.

GRRL cardholders are given free access from home to thousands of current and historical journals, magazines, newspapers, and reference books through databases, including EBSCOhost.

The GRRL digital materials has several online eBook, eAudiobook, e-Comics, Music, and Movies/TV collections through Libby (formerly Overdrive), Tumblebooks, and Hoopla. Ebooks Minnesota is an exclusive, all Minnesotan online eBook collection from Minnesota's independent publishers.
