= KZYS-LP =

- Saint Cloud, Minnesota; United States
- Broadcast area: Saint Cloud, Minnesota; Sauk Rapids, Minnesota
- Frequency: 105.1 MHz

Programming
- Format: Somali music

Ownership
- Owner: Hayaan, Inc.

History
- First air date: August 3, 2015

Technical information
- Licensing authority: FCC
- Facility ID: 194739
- Class: L1
- ERP: 45 watts
- HAAT: 44.4211 m (146 ft)
- Transmitter coordinates: 45°33′17″N 94°09′0″W

Links
- Public license information: LMS
- Website: Facebook page

KZYS-LP is a low-power broadcast radio station licensed to Saint Cloud, Minnesota, serving Saint Cloud and Sauk Rapids in Minnesota. The station signed on the air in August 2015, from a tower shared with KVEX-LP on the campus of St. Cloud State University.

The station airs an ethnic radio format, and occasionally has Islamic programming, The music is primarily the Music of Somalia. Because it only broadcasts with 45 watts, the station's coverage is generally limited to St. Cloud proper, roughly a seven mile radius.

== History ==
Work to put the station on air began in 2013. The station can be traced to a Somali immigrant, Ahmed Abdi, who immigrated to St. Cloud in the late 1990s. Abdi created a group which led to the station's genesis.

The community group St. Cloud Area Somali Salvation Organization worked with St. Cloud State University, particularly the campus-based KVSC, to construct the station. The creation of the station was partially aided by a state grant. The station existed online prior to taking to the air. The station airs mixed programming, with most being Somali language, but also some English-based programming as well.

During the COVID-19 pandemic in 2020, the station was used to assist the Somali population with information regarding the virus. The station was part of a task force focusing on providing resources to the underserved population where they would otherwise not be able to find it.

KZYS-LP is one of two radio stations in Minnesota that broadcast programming catered to the Somali American population in the state. The other station is located in Minneapolis, known as KALY-LP on 101.7 MHz.
