= St. Cloud Commercial Historic District =

Historic district in Minnesota, United States

- U.S. National Register of Historic Places
- U.S. Historic district
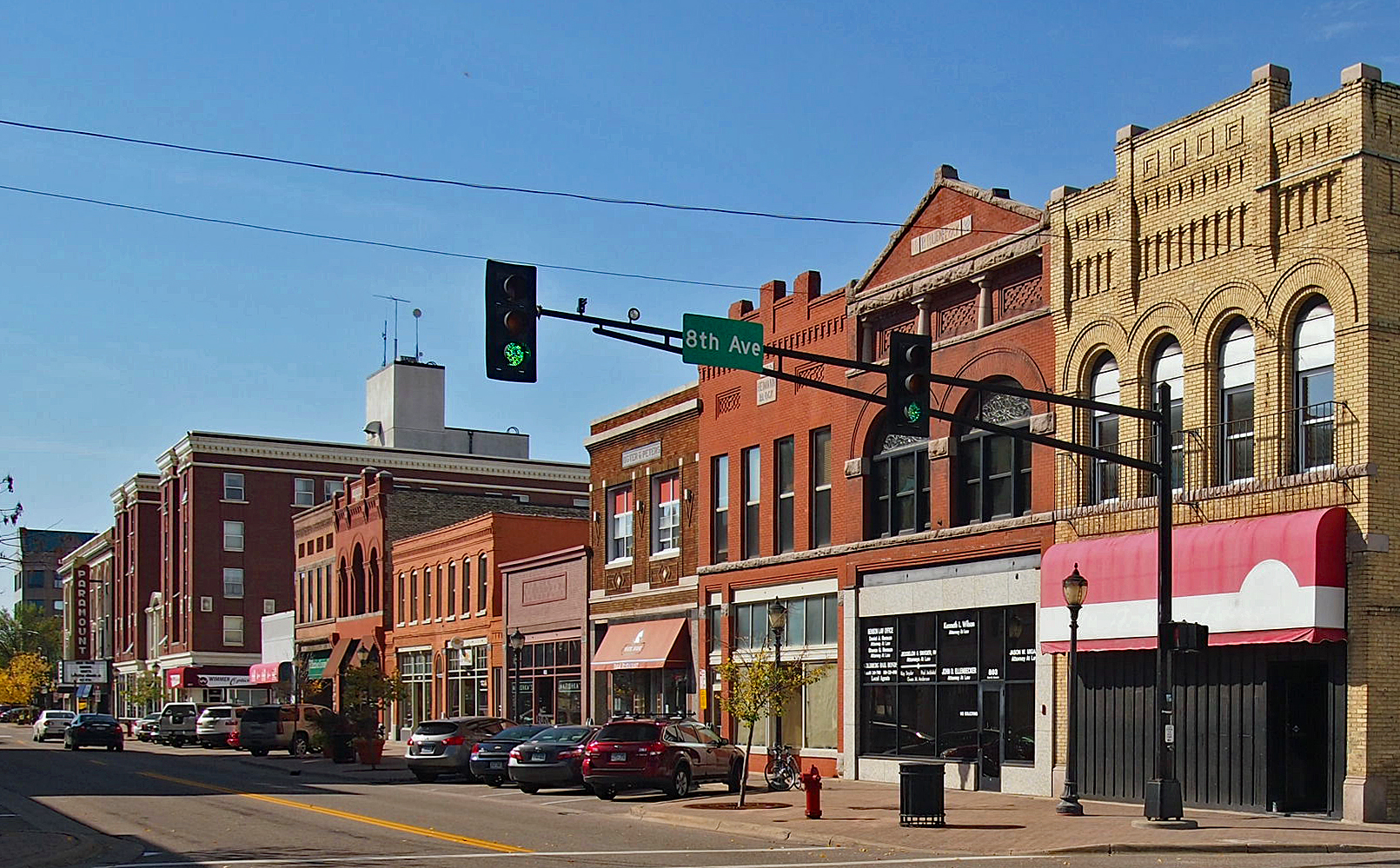
- Part of the St. Cloud Commercial Historic District

- Location within Minnesota Location within the United States
- Location: Roughly along W. St. Germain Street between 5th and 10th Avenues, St. Cloud, Minnesota
- Coordinates: 45°33′36″N 94°9′40″W
- Area: 128 acres (52 ha)
- Built: 1870–1947
- Architect: Charles Sedgwick, Toltz, King & Day, et al.
- Architectural style: Romanesque Revival, Queen Anne, Italianate
- NRHP reference No.: 98000153
- Added to NRHP: February 26, 1998

The St. Cloud Commercial Historic District is a designation applied to the historic downtown of St. Cloud, Minnesota, United States. It comprises 41 contributing properties built between 1870 and 1947. It was listed as a historic district on the National Register of Historic Places in 1998 for having local significance in the theme of commerce. It was nominated for being St. Cloud's long-serving economic center and the heart of the city.

== See also ==
- National Register of Historic Places listings in Stearns County, Minnesota
