= KCLD-FM =

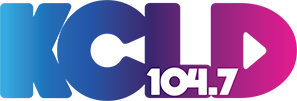
- St. Cloud, Minnesota; United States
- Broadcast area: Central Minnesota
- Frequency: 104.7 MHz
- RDS: PI: 1669; PS/RT: KCLD - Title - Artist
- Branding: 104.7 KCLD

Programming
- Language: English
- Format: Contemporary hit radio
- Affiliations: Compass Media Networks; Premiere Networks

Ownership
- Owner: Leighton Media; (Leighton Enterprises, Inc.)
- Sister stations: KCML; KNSI; KZPK; K277BS

History
- First air date: September 14, 1948
- Former call signs: KFAM-FM (1948–1975)
- Call sign meaning: St. Cloud

Technical information
- Licensing authority: FCC
- Facility ID: 37003
- Class: C
- ERP: 100,000 watts
- HAAT: 300 m (984 ft)
- Transmitter coordinates: 45°34′3″N 94°30′43″W

Links
- Public license information: Public file; LMS
- Webcast: Listen live
- Website: 1047kcld.com

KCLD-FM (104.7 FM) is a commercial radio station licensed to St. Cloud, Minnesota, United States, airing a contemporary hit format. The station is owned by Leighton Media. It has been a Top 40 outlet since 1976.

== History ==
=== KFAM-FM ===
KCLD-FM originated as KFAM-FM, an FM companion to KFAM. Both stations were owned by the Times Publishing Company, publisher of the St. Cloud Daily Times. The Federal Communications Commission (FCC) conditionally granted the FM application on April 22, 1946, and issued construction permit B4-PH-720 on June 16, 1947. The station was assigned channel 284, corresponding to 104.7 MHz. Its original transmitter was south of St. Cloud along Highway 152, while its main studio was in the Weber Building.

KFAM-FM began broadcasting on September 14, 1948. It operated on 104.7 MHz with 50,000 watts, duplicated KFAM's programming and directed part of its schedule toward farmers. The FCC granted its license to cover the construction permit on January 4, 1949.

The station continued to simulcast KFAM into the 1960s. A 1961 industry directory described its schedule as a mixture of standard music, news, weather, sports and discussion. FCC records document a 20-kilowatt facility licensed in 1964 and an increase to 40 kW in November 1965. The St. Cloud Daily Times marked the first anniversary of “KFAM-FM-Stereo” in March 1969. By 1975, KFAM-FM was operating separately from the AM station with a stereo easy listening format, 40 kW of power and an antenna height of 460 feet (140 m).

=== KCLD ===
Times Publishing sold KFAM and KFAM-FM to Leighton Enterprises, headed by Alver Leighton, for $400,000 in 1975. The FCC approved the assignment on August 28, and the transfer became effective September 15. The AM and FM stations adopted the call signs KCLD and KCLD-FM, respectively, on October 1.

The stations' programming subsequently shifted from the FM service's former easy-listening presentation. The 1977 Broadcasting Yearbook listed KCLD as a Top 40 station and reported that KCLD-FM again duplicated the AM schedule in full. A 1976 construction permit initially authorized an increase to 75 kW. After further modifications, the FCC licensed the station's 100-kilowatt facilities on July 14, 1978.

The FM station's legal call sign was shortened to KCLD on September 10, 1981, and restored to KCLD-FM on February 15, 1988. The KCLD and KNSI operation moved into a renovated building on Mall Germain in July 1982. The FCC continues to list 619 West St. Germain Street as KCLD-FM's main-studio address.

Leighton applied for a new KCLD-FM facility in February 1987, and the FCC granted the construction permit in October 1988. Following modifications in 1990 and 1991, the commission granted the license to cover on June 15, 1992. The resulting Class C facility operates with 100 kW of effective radiated power and a height above average terrain of 300 m (984 ft).

The Minnesota Broadcasters Association classified KCLD-FM as a contemporary hit radio (CHR) station in its 1990 directory and reported that it operated around the clock from 619 Mall Germain. A February 2026 Nielsen Audio market listing continued to classify KCLD-FM as CHR. Leighton's public-facing operation was renamed from Leighton Broadcasting to Leighton Media in 2024; the FCC continues to list Leighton Enterprises, Inc. as the station's licensee.

== Former on-air staff ==
Former morning hosts include Zach Pizza (2007–2008), Keri Kramer, Chris Pickett (March 2004—August 2005), Pat Ebertz, Barry Collins, Shawnda McNeal (March 2004-August 2005, now at WSTO), Rich Ward, Julie K (1995), Stevo Hunter, and John Uran.

Former mid-day personalities include Taylor Shay (now at WIAD, Washington, D.C.), Chase (now at WZEE), Cathy Cooley, Patty McLain, Cheryl West, Neal Thelen, Blake Patton, Jack Hicks, Sam Stevens, Famous Amos (now on Lite 99.9 as the morning host), and Alayna Jaye.

Former afternoon hosts include Mike Shaffer (2008–2010, now at WSTW), Brook Stephans (now at KZPK), Blaine Fowler (now at WDVD Detroit), Timmy Daniels (2005–2008), John E. Cage, Hurricane Keith Carr, and Tom Wakefield.

Former evening hosts include Wayne D (now at WSIX-FM), Wes McKane, Lackey Boy (98-99, now known as "Chris Parker" at WTVR-FM Richmond), David Black (January 1998-?), Dave Kelly (2000–2002), Dino (2002–2004, now at WFBC-FM), Mike Danger (now at WPXY), John Nordstrom (1992), Chad Brueske, Weekdays 7PM-12M “Duke in the Dark” by Earl “Duke” Stafsberg, Mike Boelter, Zannie Kaye (2014-2017), Mollie Mawlz and Darrin Feist.
