= WHMH-FM =

Rock radio station in Sauk Rapids–St. Cloud, Minnesota

- Sauk Rapids, Minnesota; United States
- Broadcast area: St. Cloud, Minnesota
- Frequency: 101.7 MHz (HD Radio)
- RDS: PI: 6863; PS/RT: Title - ARTIST
- Branding: Rockin' 101

Programming
- Format: Active rock
- Subchannels: HD2: Album-oriented rock (WXYG simulcast); HD3: Alternative rock "106point5"; HD4: Oldies/Classic hits (WMIN simulcast)
- Affiliations: Compass Media Networks, United Stations Radio Networks

Ownership
- Owner: Tri-County Broadcasting
- Sister stations: WBHR, WMIN, WXYG, WVAL

History
- First air date: October 1975; 50 years ago
- Call sign meaning: Herbert M. Hoppe (station founder)

Technical information
- Licensing authority: FCC
- Facility ID: 67694
- Class: C2
- ERP: 40,000 watts
- HAAT: 145 meters (476 ft)
- Transmitter coordinates: 45°35′48″N 94°09′25″W
- Translator: HD3: 106.5 W293CS (Sauk Rapids)

Links
- Public license information: Public file; LMS
- Webcast: Listen Live; Listen Live (HD3)
- Website: rockin101.com 106point5.com (HD3)

WHMH-FM (101.7 MHz) is a commercial radio station in Sauk Rapids, Minnesota, broadcasting an active rock radio format. The station is owned by Tri-County Broadcasting, calling itself "Rockin' 101" and commonly referred to as "The Red House". Its main competitor is KXXR "93X".

WHMH-FM has an effective radiated power (ERP) of 40,000 watts. The transmitter is on 2nd Street North at Summit Avenue South in Sauk Rapids, directly behind the studios.

== HD Radio ==
As of 2014, WHMH-FM broadcasts using HD Radio technology. Its HD2 digital subchannel carries its classic rock sister station WXYG ("Album Rock 540"), while its HD3 subchannel carries an alternative rock format known as "106point5." That signal feeds FM translator 106.5 W293CS. The HD3 subchannel formerly carried its country music sister station WVAL ("800 WVAL"). The HD4 subchannel carries adult standards sister station WMIN ("Uptown 10-10").

== History ==
WHMH-FM officially signed on the air in October 1975. The station was established by Herb Hoppe as the FM sister to his heritage AM station, WVAL. Initially, the station carried an adult contemporary format, serving as a softer alternative to the high-energy country programming on its AM counterpart. The station's branding and identity are deeply tied to its physical location, known as "The Red House" on 2nd Street North in Sauk Rapids. Following Herb Hoppe's passing in 2018, the station has remained under the family's ownership through Tri-County Broadcasting, currently led by Gary Hoppe.

For decades, WHMH operated from a tower co-located with KLZZ on the south side of St. Cloud. However, in 2015, the station completed a significant technical move, relocating its primary transmitter back to the Sauk Rapids studio site. While this move involved a slight decrease in power to 40,000 watts, the new antenna location allowed for improved signal penetration into the northern and eastern portions of the St. Cloud market.

The station's long-running "Rockin' 101" identity was forged in the 1980s as the station shifted toward a harder-edged active rock format. It is a primary competitor to Twin Cities-based active rock stations like KXXR (93X), often distinguishing itself through heavy local promotion and its status as a fully independent, family-owned outlet.

In early 2021, the station hired Twin Cities radio veteran John Lassman to host "The Johnny Rock Show" and serve as operations manager, a move aimed at refreshing the station's heritage rock image.

== Controversy ==
In late 2020, WHMH-FM became the center of a national controversy involving its morning drive program, the Steel Toe Morning Show. On November 20, 2020, host Aaron Imholte used a significant portion of his broadcast to verbally attack Heather Lee, a DJ based in Des Moines, Iowa.

During the broadcast, Imholte made disparaging comments regarding Lee’s age, weight, and professional qualifications, and urged his listeners to spread false rumors about her personal life. The incident gained widespread attention after Lee posted clips of the broadcast to SoundCloud, leading to an online campaign for Imholte’s removal. Imholte resigned from the station on November 25, 2020, stating that he did not want his actions to reflect poorly on the family-owned company.
