= KCML =

Adult contemporary radio station in St. Joseph, Minnesota

Coordinates: 45.539°N 94.168°W

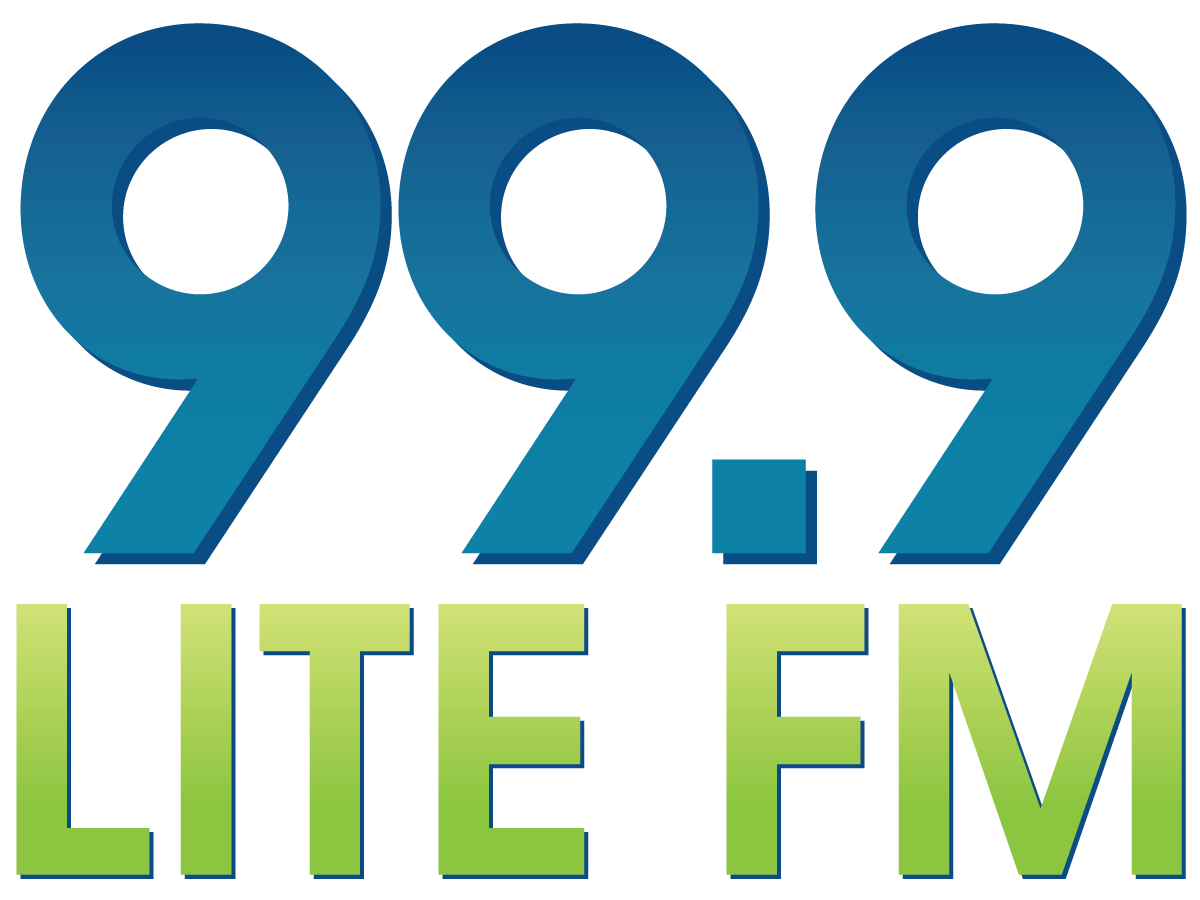
- St. Joseph, Minnesota; United States
- Broadcast area: St. Cloud, Minnesota
- Frequency: 99.9 MHz
- Branding: 99.9 Lite FM

Programming
- Format: Adult contemporary
- Affiliations: Premiere Networks

Ownership
- Owner: Leighton Broadcasting
- Sister stations: KCLD-FM, KNSI, KZPK, K277BS

History
- First air date: 1998
- Call sign meaning: K Central Minnesota's Lite Rock

Technical information
- Licensing authority: FCC
- Facility ID: 79009
- Class: C3
- ERP: 9,100 watts
- HAAT: 143 m (469 ft)

Links
- Public license information: Public file; LMS
- Webcast: Listen Live
- Website: lite999.com

KCML (99.9 FM, "Lite FM") is a radio station in St. Cloud, Minnesota, airing an adult contemporary music format. The station is owned by Leighton Broadcasting. The transmitter for KCML is located in south central St. Cloud, shared with sister station KNSI.

== History ==
The frequency's regulatory history began in 1994, when Saint John's University petitioned the Federal Communications Commission (FCC) to allot channel 260A (99.9 MHz) to Collegeville and reserve it for noncommercial educational use. The FCC dismissed the proceeding in March 1995 after determining that the proposal did not satisfy its standards for reserving a frequency in the commercial FM band and that no commenter had expressed an intention to operate the channel commercially. Later that year, Saint John's petitioned for the same channel to be allotted, without a noncommercial reservation, to Saint Joseph. The FCC added channel 260A to the Saint Joseph allotment table in November 1995. The allotment became effective December 15, with an application window lasting through January 16, 1996.

The application window drew six applicants: BCR Corporation, KFIL, Inc., Leighton Enterprises, Inc., Saint John's University, St. Joseph Radio Partnership, and Tri-County Broadcasting, Inc. Following a settlement, the FCC dismissed the five competing applications and granted Leighton a construction permit on April 13, 1998. The call sign KCML was assigned on May 15, 1998, and has remained unchanged. KCML began broadcasting in 1998 with an adult contemporary format under the "Lite Rock 99.9" brand. The station has remained within the Leighton group.

KCML carried every home and away St. Cloud State men's hockey game during the 2014–15 and 2015–16 seasons; selected games were also broadcast by the university's KVSC (88.1 FM). In April 2016, St. Cloud State announced a five-year agreement with Townsquare Media under which live hockey broadcasts moved to KZRV ("Rev 96.7").

On January 5, 2016, Leighton rebranded the station from "Lite Rock 99.9" to "99.9 More-FM" while retaining its adult contemporary format. On February 18, 2019, KCML returned to a variation of its original identity as "99.9 Lite-FM" and began using the slogan "The Most Music for Your Workday". The change also replaced Tom Kent's syndicated evening program with Delilah.

Leighton applied in November 2018 to upgrade KCML from a Class A facility operating at 2.9 kW effective radiated power (ERP) and 143 m (469 ft) height above average terrain to a Class C3 facility using a directional antenna with a maximum ERP of 12 kW at the same height. The proposed pattern limited radiation toward the west to protect adjacent-channel stations serving Browerville and Olivia. The FCC granted the construction permit on September 13, 2019, and granted the license to cover the upgraded facility on March 14, 2022.

Leighton Broadcasting adopted the public-facing name Leighton Media in 2024, while KCML's FCC license remained held by Leighton Enterprises, Inc. The station continues to identify as "99.9 Lite FM".
