= WMIN =

Radio station in Sauk Rapids, Minnesota

- Sauk Rapids, Minnesota; United States
- Frequency: 1010 kHz
- Branding: Uptown 1010

Programming
- Format: Oldies / Classic Hits
- Affiliations: Fox News Radio

Ownership
- Owner: Tri-County Broadcasting; (Herbert M. Hoppe Revocable Trust)
- Sister stations: WBHR, WHMH-FM, WXYG, WVAL

History
- First air date: 2008
- Former call signs: WPPI (2005–2008)
- Call sign meaning: MINnesota

Technical information
- Licensing authority: FCC
- Facility ID: 161428
- Class: B
- Power: 2,500 watts day 230 watts night
- Transmitter coordinates: 45°36′18″N 94°8′21″W
- Translator: 101.1 W266DT (Sauk Rapids)
- Repeater: 101.7 WHMH-HD4 (Sauk Rapids)

Links
- Public license information: Public file; LMS
- Webcast: Listen Live
- Website: www.1010wmin.com

WMIN (1010 AM, "Uptown 1010") is a radio station licensed to serve Sauk Rapids, Minnesota, United States. The station is part of the Tri-County Broadcasting group and the broadcast license is held by the Herbert M. Hoppe Revocable Trust.

== Programming ==
Initially, WMIN broadcast an adult standards / big band music format that was referred to by the tag "Ring-A-Ding Radio" starting in 2009. On April 14, 2026, WMIN slightly adjusted to an classic hits-adjacent format focusing on oldies. The station also airs "Jukebox Saturday Night," a program that highlights golden oldies from the '50s and '60s. Network news comes from Fox News Radio.

== History ==
The station received its original construction permit in 2005 under the call sign WPPI. It officially adopted the heritage WMIN call letters on December 2, 2008, a call sign previously famous in the Twin Cities market. As WPPI the station temporarily carried a modern rock format that had aired on a subcarrier of sister station of WHMH 101.7.

The station is owned and operated by Tri-County Broadcasting (licensed under the Herbert M. Hoppe Revocable Trust). WMIN is part of a rare engineering feat in American broadcasting known as the "Quadplex." The station shares a single seven-tower transmitter site in Sauk Rapids with three other AM signals: WVAL (800 kHz), WBHR (660 kHz), and WXYG (540 kHz). This "quadplexing" system allows four separate stations to operate using the same physical towers, a process that requires complex filtering and reject-reject circuitry to prevent the signals from interfering with one another. Each of the four stations at the site utilizes a directional antenna pattern, resulting in eight different signal patterns emanating from the towers over a 24-hour period.

In late 2021, the FCC granted WMIN a construction permit to modify its signal from 1.7 kW daytime power to 2.5 kW.

Logo before translator sign on
