= KNSI =

Radio station in St. Cloud, Minnesota

Coordinates: 45°32′21″N 94°10′5″W

- St. Cloud, Minnesota; United States
- Broadcast area: Central Minnesota
- Frequency: 1450 kHz
- Branding: NewsTalk 1450 KNSI

Programming
- Format: Talk radio
- Affiliations: Fox News Radio; Compass Media Networks; Premiere Networks; Westwood One

Ownership
- Owner: Leighton Media; (Leighton Enterprises, Inc.)
- Sister stations: KCLD-FM; KCML; KZPK; K277BS

History
- First air date: June 4, 1938
- Former call signs: KFAM (1938–1975); KCLD (1975–1981, 1988–1990); KNSI (1981–1988)
- Call sign meaning: Know News, Sports and Information

Technical information
- Licensing authority: FCC
- Facility ID: 37002
- Class: C
- Power: 1,000 watts (unlimited)
- Translator: 99.3 K257GK (St. Cloud)
- Repeater: 98.9 KZPK-HD2 (Paynesville)

Links
- Public license information: Public file; LMS
- Webcast: Listen live
- Website: knsiradio.com

KNSI (1450 AM) is a commercial radio station licensed to St. Cloud, Minnesota, United States. It is owned by Leighton Media, which also owns KCLD-FM, KZPK and KCML. KNSI is also carried on HD Radio, via KZPK-HD2.

== History ==
The station was first licensed on December 20, 1937, and went on the air on June 4, 1938, as KFAM on 1420 kHz for a two-day preview. Regular programming began on June 6. The call letters recalled an earlier St. Cloud station, WFAM, owned by the Times Publishing Company and the St. Cloud Daily Times, which had been first licensed in June 1922 and deleted in the summer of 1928; the new KFAM was also owned by the Times. In 1941, under the provisions of the North American Regional Broadcasting Agreement, KFAM moved to its current frequency of 1450 kHz.

In September 1948, KFAM was joined by a sister station, KFAM-FM 104.7. The two stations were later sold to Alver Leighton in September 1975 and changed their call letters to KCLD and KCLD-FM.
