= Tri-County Broadcasting =

American radio broadcasting company

Tri-County Broadcasting is a radio broadcasting company located in Sauk Rapids, Minnesota. It was founded by Herbert M. Hoppe, long time local radio broadcaster who started out building small AM stations. The stations serve the St. Cloud, Minnesota regional market.

Tri-County Broadcasting currently operates six radio stations in the area:

- WXYG AM 540 / K232GA FM 94.3 "Album Rock 540 The Goat" - Album Rock
- WBHR AM 660 / W239CU FM 95.7 "The Bear" - Sports Radio
- WVAL AM 800 / W272EG FM 102.3 "AM 800 WVAL" - Classic Country
- WMIN AM 1010 / W266DT FM 101.1 "Uptown 1010" - Adult Standards
- WHMH FM 101.7 "Rockin' 101" (HD) - Active Rock
- WHMH-HD2 FM 101.7 / W297BO FM 107.3 "Album Rock 540 The Goat" - Album Rock (WXYG simulcast)
- WHMH-HD3 FM 101.7 / W293CS FM 106.5 "The Point" - Alternative Rock
- WHMH-HD4 FM 101.7 / W266DT FM 101.1 "Uptown 1010" - Adult Standards (WMIN simulcast)

All the stations are located at "The Red House", 1010 2nd Street North in Sauk Rapids, Minnesota. All the AM transmitters and towers share a site east of the studios, northeast of Highway 10 and Golden Spike Road. WHMH's tower is behind the studio, shared with translators for WXYG and WHMH-HD3.
