= WXYG =

- Sauk Rapids, Minnesota; United States
- Frequency: 540 kHz C-QUAM AM Stereo
- Branding: Album Rock 540, The Goat

Programming
- Format: Album-oriented rock

Ownership
- Owner: Tri-County Broadcasting; (Herbert M. Hoppe Revocable Trust)
- Sister stations: WBHR, WHMH-FM, WMIN, WVAL

History
- First air date: 2011
- Former call signs: WXYG (2007–2008); WMIN (2008); WPPI (2008–2009)

Technical information
- Licensing authority: FCC
- Facility ID: 161448
- Class: B
- Power: 850 watts (day); 250 watts (night)
- Transmitter coordinates: 45°36′18″N 94°8′21″W
- Translators: 94.3 K232GA (Sauk Rapids); 107.3 W297BO (Sauk Rapids)
- Repeater: (101.7-2) WHMH-HD2 (Sauk Rapids)

Links
- Public license information: Public file; LMS
- Webcast: Listen live
- Website: 540wxyg.com

WXYG (540 AM) is a radio station licensed to Sauk Rapids, Minnesota, United States. The station is part of the Tri-County Broadcasting group with the license held by the Herbert M. Hoppe Revocable Trust. WXYG broadcasts an album-oriented rock format. In addition to a standard analog transmission, WXYG simulcasts over the second HD Radio digital subchannel of WHMH-FM, and streams online via the TuneIn app.

== History ==
This station received its original construction permit from the Federal Communications Commission on July 26, 2007. The new station was assigned the call sign WXYG by the FCC on September 10, 2007. The call sign was changed to WMIN on August 12, 2008; to WPPI on December 2, 2008; and back to WXYG on December 14, 2009. This construction permit was scheduled to expire on July 25, 2010.

As of November 8, 2010, WXYG, which had been occasionally testing with a mix of rock and country music since June, began playing Christmas music. The station resumed testing after the holiday season. On May 23, 2011, the FCC granted the station program test authority to begin broadcasting before receiving its broadcast license.

On June 24, 2011, WXYG ended testing and signed on the air with album-oriented rock, branded as "Album Rock 540, The Goat". The station's broadcast license was issued by the FCC on January 27, 2012. The station plays a large library of deep classic rock album cuts.

The station shares towers with three of its sister AM stations. There are seven total towers.

In March 2016 WXYG was granted an FCC construction permit to increase the day power to 850 watts. Work on the upgraded signal was complete by mid-June 2016. The station now broadcasts with 850 watts during the day. The station celebrated its fifth birthday in late June 2016 by playing its entire library from A-Z. Station program manager Al Neff noted it would take nine to ten days to get through the entire catalog.

== Signal ==
WXYG broadcasts with a power of 850 watts during the daytime hours utilizing a tower array of 4 towers and a power of 250 watts during the nighttime hours utilizing a tower array of 3 towers. The station's daytime signal provides at least grade B (fringe) coverage to the Twin Cities, as well as locations such as North Branch, Hutchinson, Alexandria, and as far east as New Richmond, Grantsburg, Hudson, Spring Valley, River Falls, St. Croix Falls, Ellsworth, and Rice Lake in Wisconsin and its nighttime signal is aimed due south and extends as far south as Hutchinson and Glencoe, and as far west as Albany, but only as far east as Zimmerman. WXYG's skywave signal has been received as far southeast as Barrington, Illinois (near Chicago) and as far west as Sheridan, Wyoming.
