= Becker County Museum =

County museum in Detroit Lakes, Minnesota

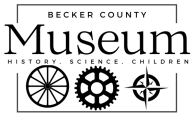

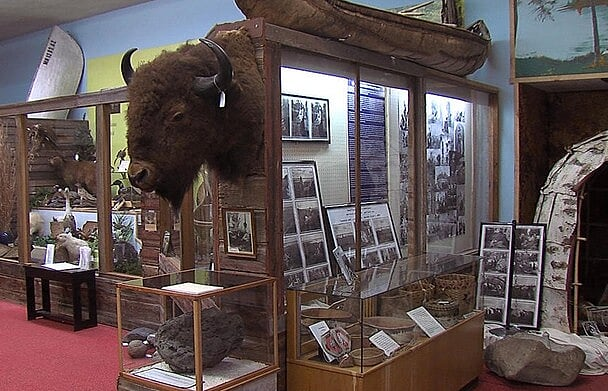
- Interior of museum
- Established: 1882
- Location: 714 Summit Ave, Detroit Lakes, Minnesota 56501
- Coordinates: 46°49′7.5″N 95°51′1.6″W519913
- Type: Local history
- Executive director: Becky Mitchell
- Website: beckercountyhistory.org

The Becker County Museum is located in Detroit Lakes, Minnesota. It is one of the oldest museums in the state focused on local history. The museum collects and preserves artifacts and records related to Becker County and its residents.

== History ==
The Becker County Historical Society was founded in 1882, originally named the Pioneer Settlers Union. Members had to prove they settled in the county before 1872. The goal was to gather and preserve information about early settlers. In 1924, the group changed its name to the Becker County Historical Society.

The museum opened in 1943. At first, the collection was kept in a library closet and later moved to the courthouse basement. The museum moved several times as its collection grew. Attempts to renovate an old school for the museum were stopped due to a fire. In 1989, the society bought a former church building and converted it into a museum.

The collection includes more than 14,000 photographs and over 20,000 artifacts. It also holds historical documents like property tax records going back to 1880.

== New Museum Building ==
In 2015, the society began raising funds for a new museum building. The project cost about $6.4 million. Half of the funding came from a state bonding bill passed in 2020.

Construction started in May 2021. Officials from the city and state attended the groundbreaking. The old museum building was torn down in late 2022 because it had structural and climate control problems that made artifact preservation difficult.

The new museum opened in phases in 2023. The second floor, which focuses on science and STEM education, opened in February 2023. The full building opened soon after.

The new facility is two stories and includes a space for historical exhibits and a science center with interactive educational exhibits. It has modern climate control to protect the collections and meeting spaces for public use.

== Collections and Exhibits ==
The museum displays artifacts related to Native American history and prehistoric fossils. It also has items from early settlers, including a pioneer cabin. One distinctive piece is the "World's Smallest Gas Station," which was uniquely small due to its location in a road. It has hosted exhibits on historical figures and topics, including Leonardo da Vinci and former U.S. Representative Collin Peterson.

The museum plays a role at the annual Becker County Fair by helping maintain and showcase historic buildings like the fairgrounds schoolhouse. Museum staff work with the fair board to provide historical displays and artifacts, making local history accessible to visitors. Their involvement ensures that the fair connects the community with Becker County's past each year.
