= James Evans (Minnesota politician) =

American politician

Stephen James Evans (January 1, 1927 – January 6, 2012) was an American politician and business owner.

Evans was born in Little Falls, Minnesota. He lived in Detroit Lakes, Minnesota with his wife and family and graduated from the Detroit Lakes High School. He served in the United States Air Force during World War II and was involved in the retail grocery business. Evans went to the University of North Dakota. Evans served in the Minnesota House of Representatives from 1977 to 1984 and was a Republican.
