= Howard Middle School =

Howard Middle School may refer to:

- Howard Middle School (Ocala, Florida)
- Howard Middle School (Orlando, Florida)
- Howard Middle School (Macon, Georgia)
