= Detroit Lake (Minnesota) =

Lake in Minnesota

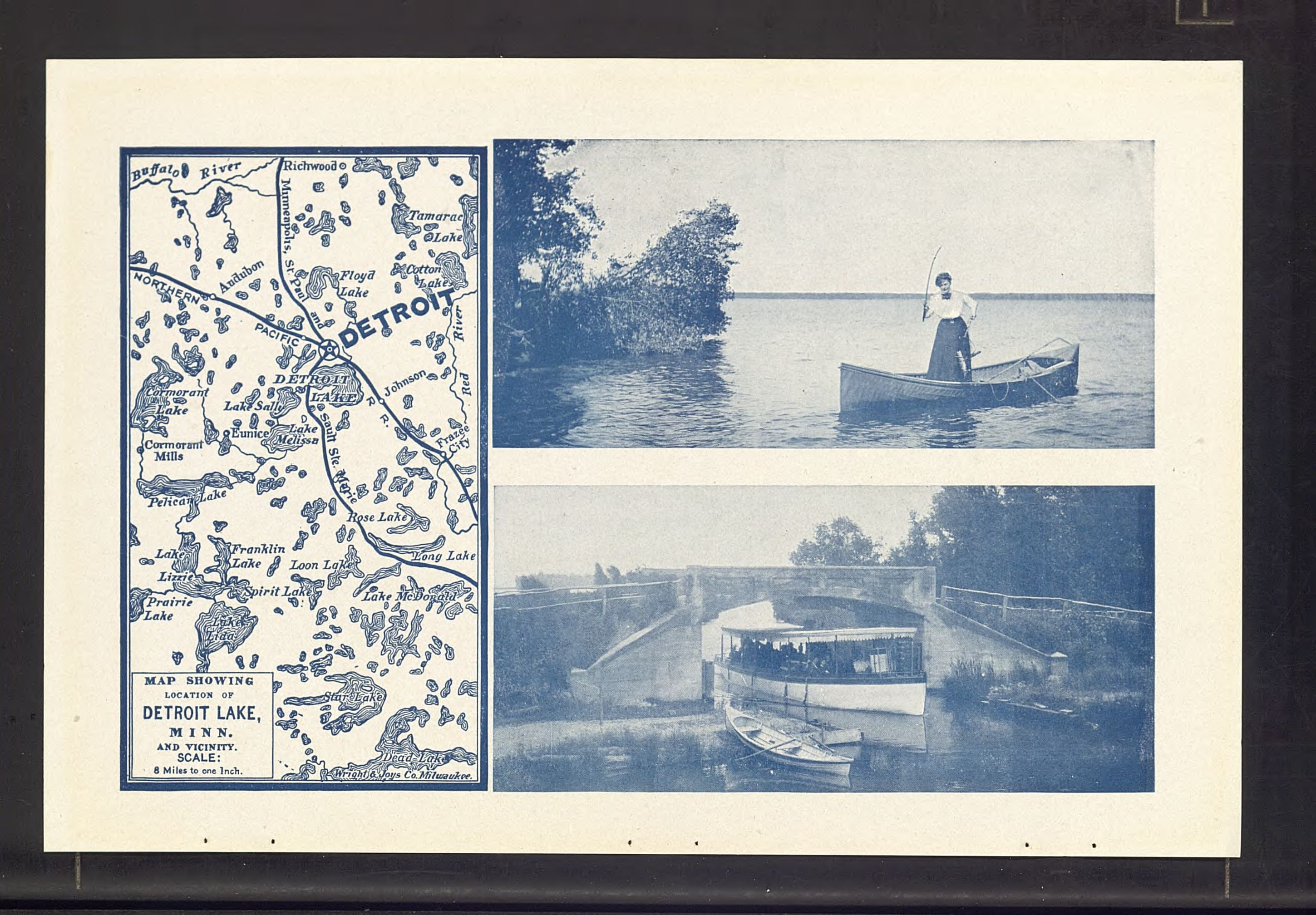
- A photo collage that includes two photos of boats on the lake and a map showing location of Detroit Lake, Minnesota, from A Combined Souvenir, History and Decennial Financial Statement of the Church of Our Lady of the Rosary, Detroit, Minnesota.

- Location within Minnesota Location within the United States
- Location: Becker county, Minnesota, United States
- Coordinates: 46.7883°N 95.8224°W
- Primary inflows: Pelican River
- Basin countries: United States
- Surface area: 3,067 acres (1,241 hectares)
- Max. depth: 89 ft (27 m)
- Shore length^{1}: 12.93 mi (20 km)
- Surface elevation: 1,368 ft (417 m)
- Settlements: Detroit Lakes
- ^{1} Shore length is not a well-defined measure.

Detroit Lake is a lake in Becker County, Minnesota. It has two distinct basins separated by a shallow gravel bar, locally known as Big Detroit and Little Detroit. At 3,067 acres, Detroit Lake is the largest lake within the Pelican River Watershed District and lies entirely within the city of Detroit Lakes, Minnesota municipal boundaries.

== Geological history ==
Detroit Lake was created about 10,000 years ago as the receding glaciers left thick deposits of gravel, sand and clay. Broken from the glacier and embedded in these deposits were large chunks of ice which, when melted, left depressions to become lakes, including Detroit.

== See also ==
- List of lakes in Minnesota
