= Adam Thielen =

American football player (born 1990)

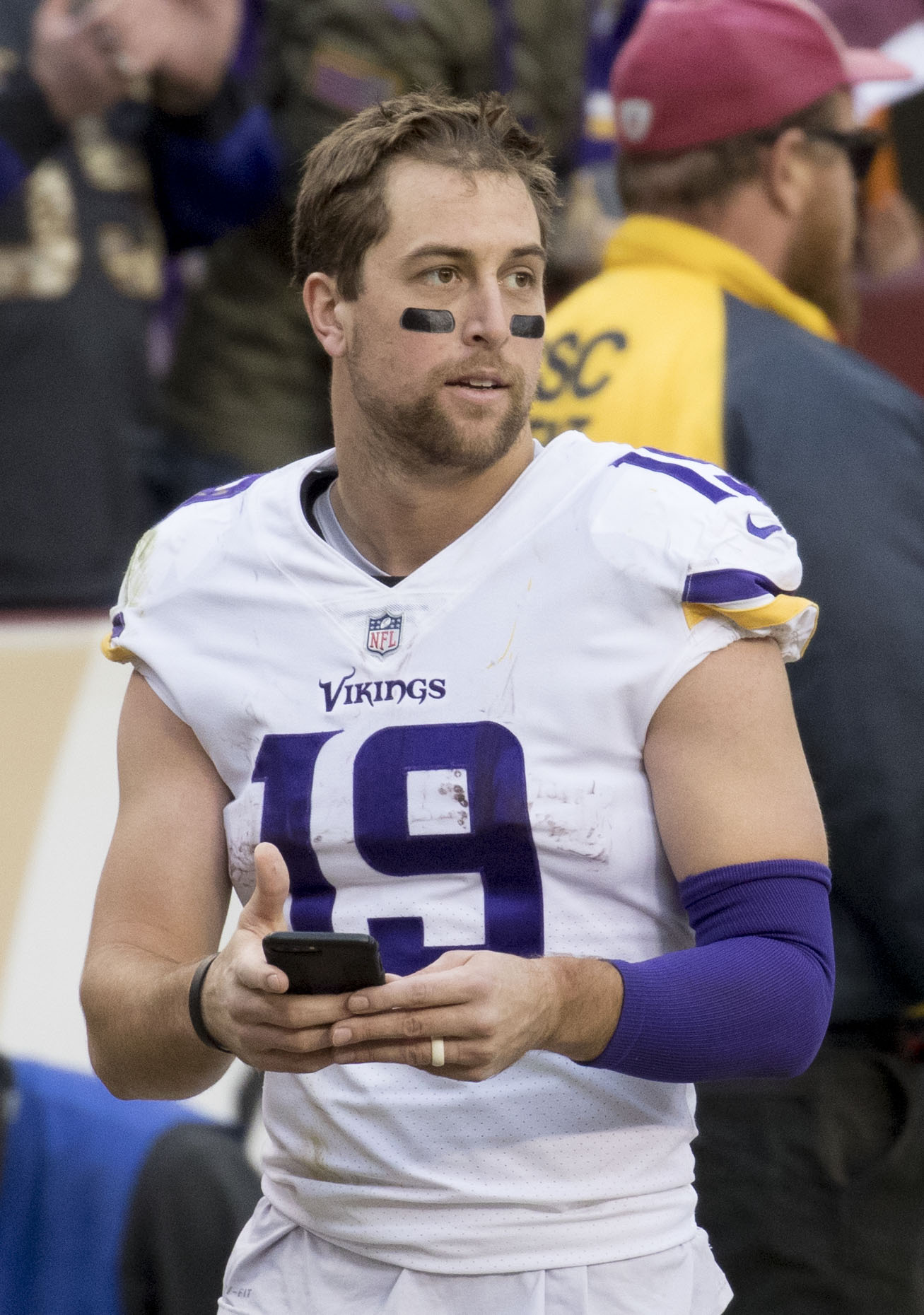
- Thielen with the Minnesota Vikings in 2017

No. 19, 16
- Position: Wide receiver

Personal information
- Born: August 22, 1990 (age 36); Detroit Lakes, Minnesota, U.S.
- Listed height: 6 ft 2 in (1.88 m)
- Listed weight: 200 lb (91 kg)

Career information
- High school: Detroit Lakes
- College: Minnesota State (2008–2012)
- NFL draft: 2013: undrafted

Career history
- Minnesota Vikings (2013–2022); Carolina Panthers (2023–2024); Minnesota Vikings (2025); Pittsburgh Steelers (2025)

Awards and highlights
- Second-team All-Pro (2017); 2× Pro Bowl (2017, 2018); First-team All-NSIC South Division (2012); 2× Second-team All-NSIC South Division (2010, 2011); NFL record: Most consecutive 100-yard receiving games: 8

Career NFL statistics
- Receptions: 704
- Receiving yards: 8,497
- Receiving touchdowns: 64
- Rushing yards: 178
- Rushing touchdowns: 1
- Stats at Pro Football Reference

Adam John Thielen (born August 22, 1990) is an American former professional football player who was a wide receiver for 13 seasons in the National Football League (NFL). He played college football for the Minnesota State Mavericks and signed with the Minnesota Vikings as an undrafted free agent in 2013, playing for them for 10 seasons. Thielen holds several NFL records, including eight straight games over 100+ yards receiving, and 74 receptions in the first half of a season. Thielen also played in the NFL for the Carolina Panthers and Pittsburgh Steelers.

== Early life ==
Born in Detroit Lakes, Minnesota, to Pete and Jayne Thielen, alongside his cousins, Adam grew up rooting for the Vikings and idolized Pro Football Hall of Fame wide receivers Cris Carter and Randy Moss, wearing their Vikings jerseys while practicing in his back yard as a child. He attended Detroit Lakes High School, where he participated in four sports (football, basketball, baseball and golf). In football, he helped lead the Lakers to a 9–1 season and was an All-conference and All-state selection in his senior season. That same year, he also was a member of a Detroit Lakes golf team that won the 2008 2A Minnesota state championship.

== College career ==
After redshirting the 2008 season at Minnesota State University, Mankato, Thielen played in nine games and caught 21 passes for 252 yards and a touchdown as a freshman in 2009. As a sophomore in 2010, he started in all 11 games and was named Minnesota State's Offensive Player of the Year in addition to the All-Northern Sun Intercollegiate Conference (NSIC) South Division second-team after he led the team with 41 receptions for 686 yards and six touchdowns. In 2011, he started all 12 games and was a second-team All-NSIC South Division selection for the second-straight season as he hauled in 62 passes for 715 yards and five touchdowns on offense and also handled kick return (three kicks for 77 yards and a score) and punt return duties (22 punts for 217 yards). During the 2012 season, Thielen became the main target for Minnesota State's passing attack and was again the team's starting kick and punt returner, helping the Mavericks to a 13–1 record, as they advanced to the NCAA Semi-finals. He led the Minnesota State receiving corps with 74 receptions for a total of 1,176 yards (15.9 avg) and eight touchdowns. For his efforts, Thielen was named to the NSIC South Division All-NSIC first-team, the Daktronics Super Region No. 3 second-team, and the Don Hansen Super Region second-team. Thielen finished near the top of several career receiving categories after his four years at Minnesota State including finishing second in receiving yards (2,802), second in receptions (198), and third in touchdown catches (20). As a Maverick, he notched five 100-yard receiving games, including a career-high of 167 against Southwest Minnesota State in 2012. Thielen studied Sports Management at Minnesota State University, Mankato.

== Professional career ==
=== Pre-draft ===
Pre-draft measurables
Height	Weight	Arm length	Hand span	40-yard dash	10-yard split	20-yard split	20-yard shuttle	Three-cone drill	Vertical jump	Broad jump
6 ft 1 1/8 in (1.86 m)	192 lb (87 kg)	32 7/8 in (0.84 m)	9 3/4 in (0.25 m)	4.45 s	1.57 s	2.54 s	4.49 s	6.77 s	36 in (0.91 m)	10 ft 0 in (3.05 m)
All values from Super Regional Combine

Thielen did not receive an invitation to perform at the 2013 NFL Combine, but he did attend a Regional Combine in Chicago in March, where he performed well enough to warrant an invitation to the Super Regional Combine held in Dallas, Texas in April. There, he showcased his athletic ability, completing the 40-yard dash in 4.45 seconds and impressing in the three-cone drill with a time of 6.77 seconds, a mark that would have placed him in the top 20 at the NFL Combine.

=== Minnesota Vikings (first stint) ===
==== 2013 ====
After going undrafted in the 2013 NFL draft, Thielen attended a rookie tryout and evaluation session at Winter Park with the Minnesota Vikings. On May 6, 2013, the Vikings signed Thielen to a three-year, $1.48 million contract as an undrafted free agent. On August 31, 2013, the Minnesota Vikings waived Thielen as part of their final roster cuts (along with 18 others), but he was signed to the practice squad the next day. He saw some preseason action as a wide receiver and on special teams.

==== 2014 ====
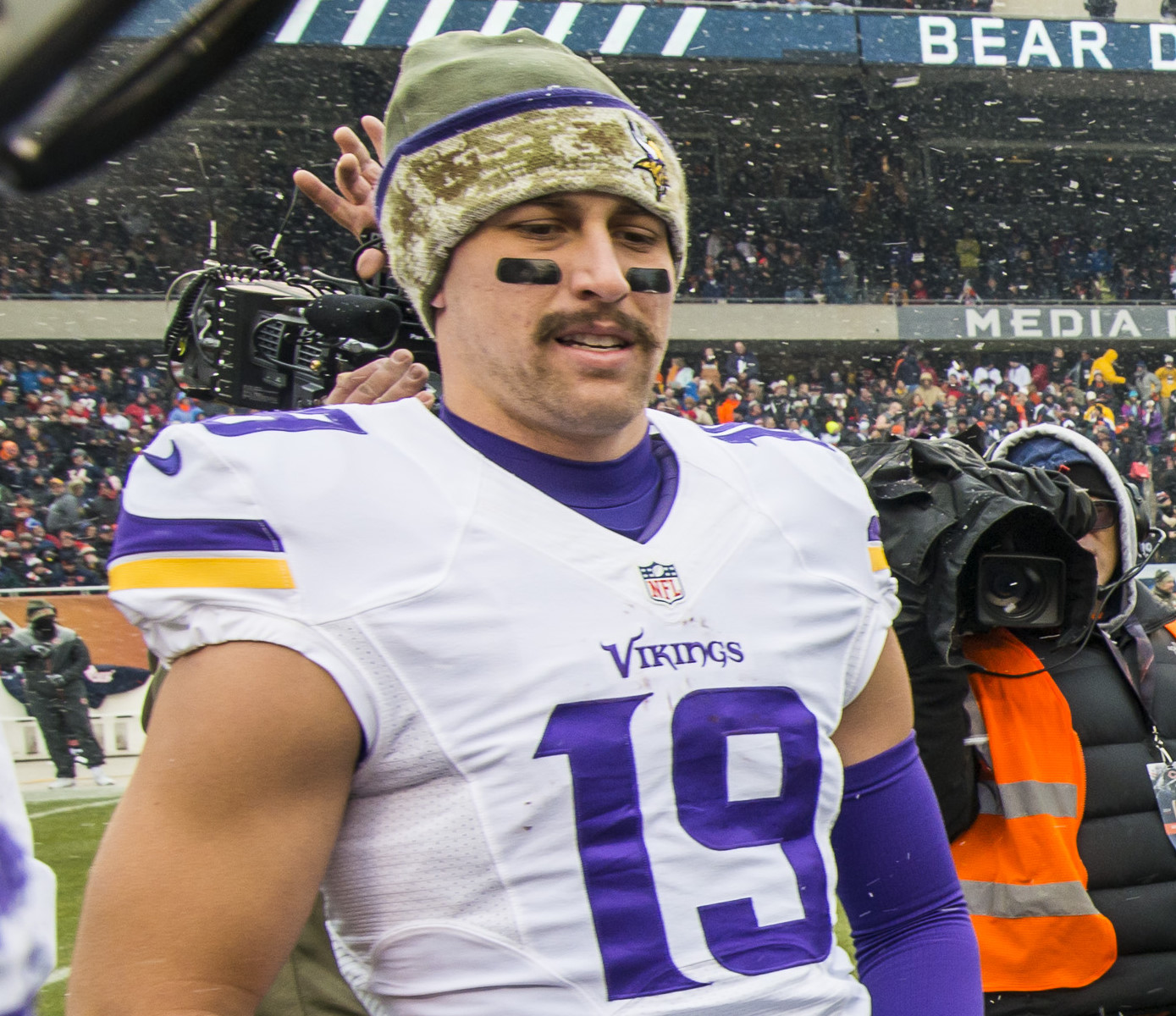
Thielen with the Minnesota Vikings in 2014

After a strong preseason performance in both offense and special teams, Thielen earned a spot on the 53-man roster to start the 2014 campaign.

Thielen made his NFL debut in the season opener in a road game against the St. Louis Rams on September 7. In Week 5, he caught his first NFL pass in the Vikings' 42–10 road loss against the Green Bay Packers, finishing the game with four receptions for 57 yards that led the team in receiving. He was named NFC Special Teams Player of Week 13 after he scored his first NFL touchdown on a special teams play in which he blocked Carolina Panthers' punter Brad Nortman's kick and returned the ball 30 yards to the end zone. Thielen briefly held the record for the longest blocked punt returned for a touchdown in franchise history, but was beaten later in the second quarter with a 43-yarder from Everson Griffen as the Vikings had two blocked punts returned for touchdowns in the game. In Week 17 against the Chicago Bears, Thielen scored his first receiving touchdown on a 44-yard pass from quarterback Teddy Bridgewater, after which he promptly gave the ball to his wife (then fiancée) Caitlin.

For the season, Thielen totaled eight catches for 137 yards (17.1 avg) and a touchdown on offense. Also a special teams ace, Thielen was named to the All-Pro Special Teams Kick Return Unit and was named All-NFC North Special Team Player of the Year by Pro Football Focus (PFF) after he finished tied for second in the team in special teams tackles with 12 (9 of them solo).

==== 2015 ====
In Week 4, Thielen hauled in a career-high six passes for 70 yards in a road game at the eventual Super Bowl champions Denver Broncos. In the regular season finale road game against the Packers on January 3, 2016, for the NFC North division, the Vikings executed a fake punt during the first drive of the game in which Thielen ran for 41 yards. He carried the ball another time for 26 yards, totaling 67 yards on two carries that tied for second in Vikings history for rushing yards in a game by a wide receiver with the effort. He also added a 16-yard catch as the Vikings ultimately clinched the NFC North title. Thielen finished the season with 12 catches for 144 yards with a long of 30. In 2015, Thielen was honored as the Vikings Special Teams Player of the Year. His seven special teams tackles tied for second on the team.

==== 2016 ====
With Stefon Diggs sidelined due to a groin injury, Thielen received the starting nod in his place for Week 5. Against the Houston Texans, he broke 100 receiving yards in a game for the first time in his career as he finished the game with seven catches for 127 yards and a touchdown. In the Vikings' loss to the Washington Redskins in Week 10, Thielen caught his second touchdown of the season on a 3-yard toss from Sam Bradford and also carried the ball once for 11 yards. Thielen had a career day on December 24, 2016, in a Week 16 loss to the Packers with a 202-yard, two-touchdown performance at Lambeau Field. His performance was just the fifth 200-yard receiving performance in Vikings history and the third that saw a Vikings receiver have at least 200 yards receiving and two touchdowns. He had the most receiving yards by a Viking since Percy Harvin in 2011. Thielen needed only 40 yards receiving in the Week 17 Bears game to hit 1,000 yards on the season, and only once in the previous six games had he been held under 50 yards. However, he was targeted only once for a seven-yard gain to finish the season with 967 yards, giving the Vikings their first pair of Vikings receivers with 900 yards each since Randy Moss and Cris Carter accomplished the feat.

After having entered the 2016 season as an underdog, Thielen ended up leading the Vikings with 967 receiving yards, while also adding a career-high 69 catches and five touchdowns. His 10.0 yards per target and 75.0% catch rate ranked in the top five players among NFL wide receivers. Thielen dropped only two passes on 92 targets according to Sporting Charts, and Pro Football Focus ranked him as the 18th best receiver in the league. For his efforts, NFL.com named Thielen as their "Unsung Hero" for the Minnesota Vikings.

==== 2017 ====
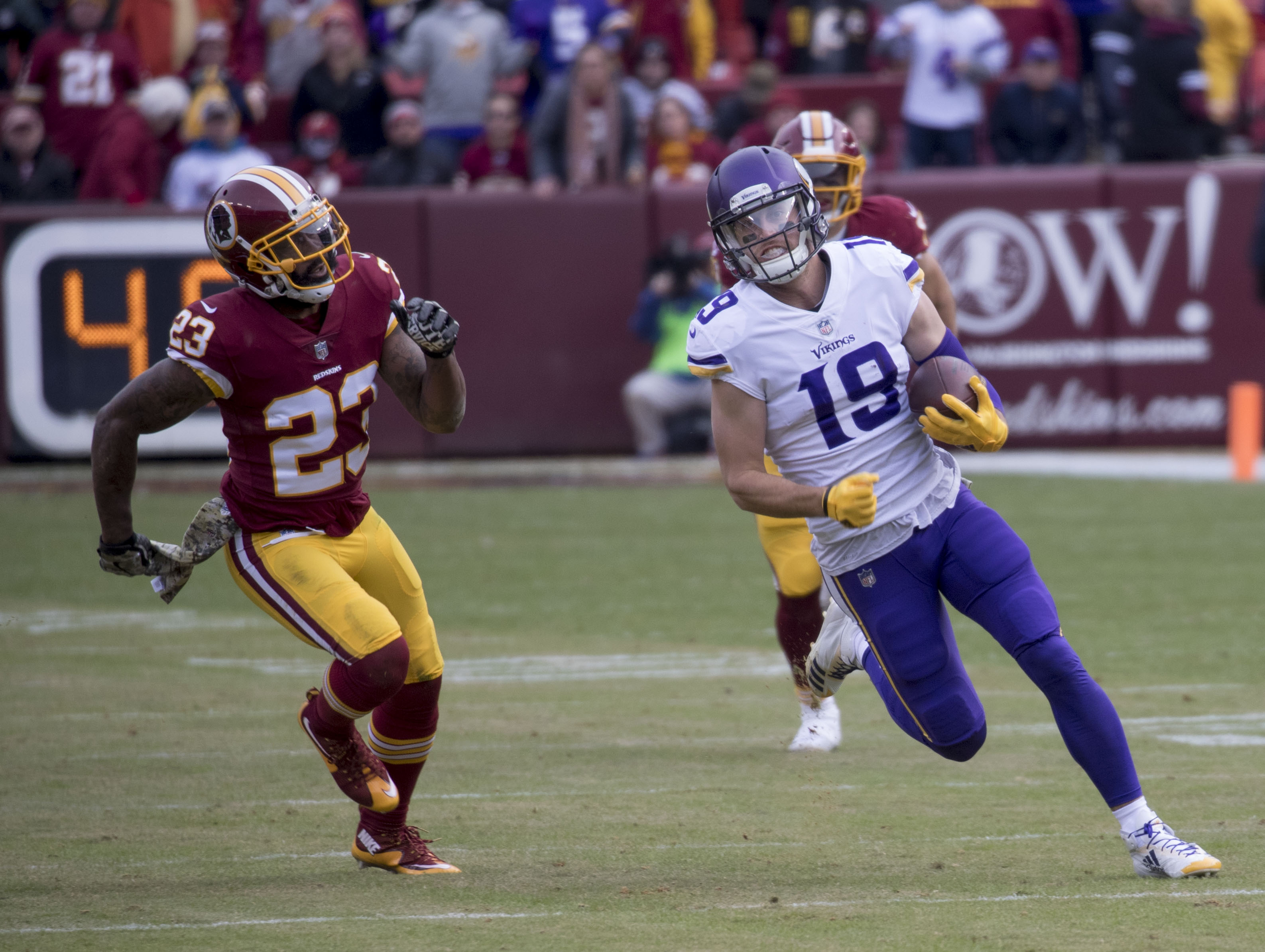
Thielen in a game against the Redskins in 2017

On March 15, 2017, Thielen signed a three-year contract extension with the Vikings.

On September 11, 2017, in the season opener against the New Orleans Saints on Monday Night Football, Thielen started the season off strong with nine receptions for 157 yards. In Week 8, Thielen scored his first touchdown of the season against the Cleveland Browns at Twickenham Stadium, London from quarterback Case Keenum. During Week 10 against the Redskins, Thielen finished with 166 receiving yards and a touchdown as the Vikings won 38–30. The following week against the Los Angeles Rams, Thielen finished the game with six catches for 123 yards, including a 65-yard touchdown reception. During the Week 12 Thanksgiving matchup against division rival, Detroit Lions, Thielen had eight receptions for 89 yards in the Vikings 30–23 victory. Thielen's output put him over the 1,000-yard mark for the season. He became the first Vikings receiver to surpass the 1,000-yard mark since Sidney Rice in 2009. On December 19, 2017, Thielen was named to his first Pro Bowl. The Vikings won the NFC North with a 13–3 record. In the Divisional Round against the Saints, he had six receptions for 74 yards in the 29–24 victory. In the NFC Championship against the Philadelphia Eagles, he had three receptions for 28 yards in the 38–7 loss. He was ranked #36 by his fellow players on the NFL Top 100 Players of 2018.

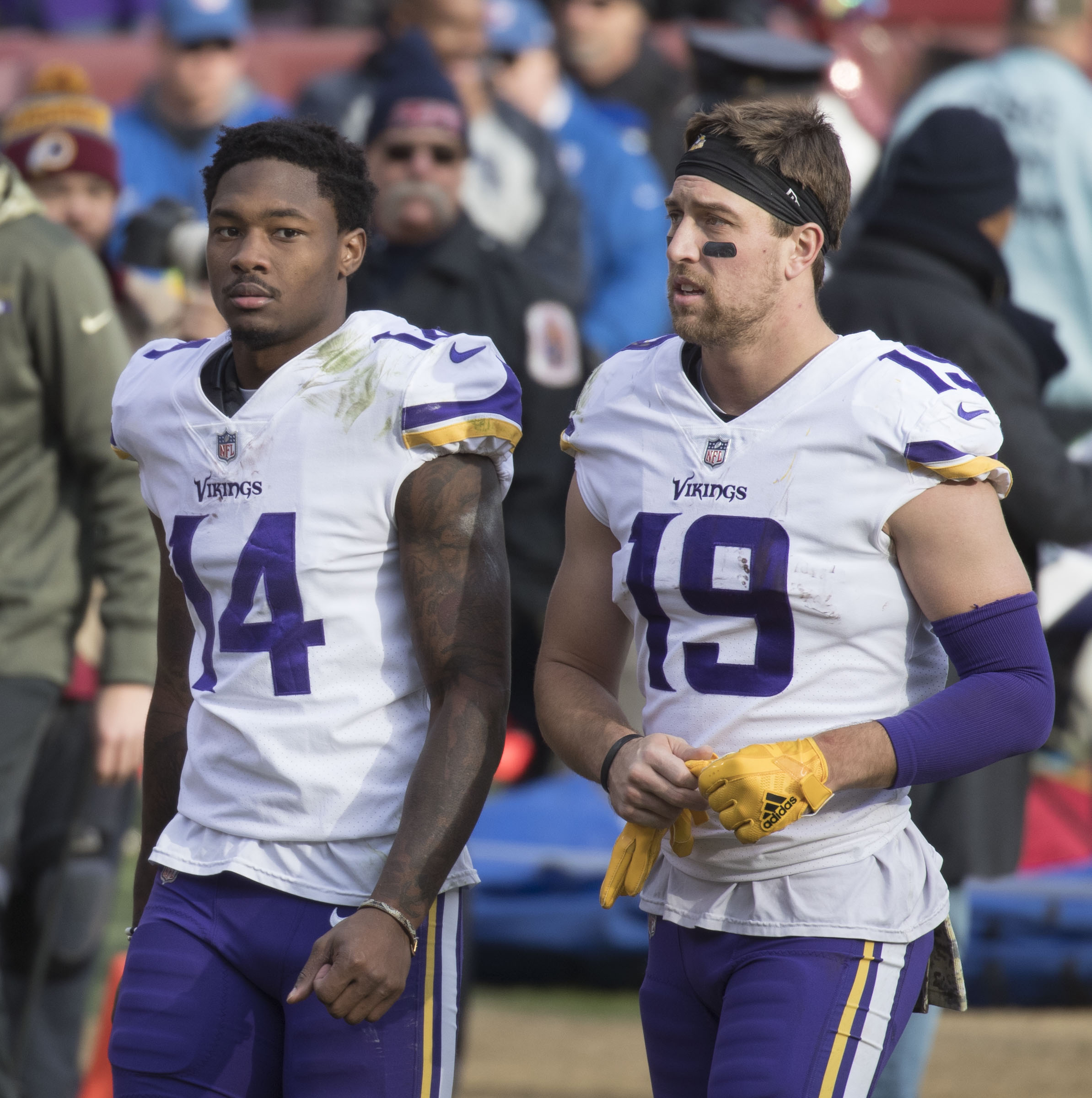
Thielen and Stefon Diggs in 2017

==== 2018 ====
Going into the 2018 season, Thielen had a new quarterback in Kirk Cousins. He started off the season strong with six receptions for 102 receiving yards in a 24–16 victory over the San Francisco 49ers. He followed that up with a then-career high 12 receptions for 131 receiving yards and a touchdown in the 29–29 tie with the Packers. In Week 3, in a 27–6 loss to the Buffalo Bills, he recorded his third consecutive game with at least 100 receiving yards with a career-high 14 receptions for 105 receiving yards. In Week 4, in a 38–31 loss to the Rams, he had eight receptions for 135 receiving yards and a touchdown. With this fourth consecutive game with at least 100 receiving yards to start the season, he joined Randy Moss and Isaac Bruce as the only players in the Super Bowl era to accomplish the feat. In Week 5, against the Eagles, Thielen recorded seven catches for 116 yards and a touchdown. He became the first player in the Super Bowl era to record five straight 100-yard receiving games to start a season. In Week 6, against the Arizona Cardinals, he had seven receptions for 123 yards and a touchdown. In the following game, against the New York Jets, he had nine receptions for 110 yards and a touchdown for this seventh consecutive game topping 100 receiving yards. As of Week 8, he had 100 yards in each of the first eight games of the year, which is tied with Calvin Johnson for the record for most consecutive 100 yard games in a year. By doing so, he also broke the record for most consecutive 100 yard games to start a season in NFL history. In Week 9, against the Lions, the streak came to an end when he posted four receptions for 22 receiving yards and a receiving touchdown, which he managed to achieve for the sixth consecutive game. In Week 12, against the Green Bay Packers, he recorded eight receptions for 125 receiving yards and a receiving touchdown in the 24–17 victory. Overall, he finished the 2018 season with 113 receptions for 1,373 receiving yards and nine receiving touchdowns. He was ranked #33 by his fellow players on the NFL Top 100 Players of 2019.

==== 2019 ====
On April 12, 2019, Thielen signed a four-year, $64 million contract extension with the Vikings with $35 million guaranteed, keeping him under contract through the 2024 season. In Week 3 against the Oakland Raiders, Thielen caught three passes for 55 yards and a touchdown and rushed for a one-yard touchdown in the 34–14 win. In Week 4 against the Bears, Thielen caught two passes for six yards in the 6–16 loss. After the game, Thielen was very critical of Vikings' quarterback Kirk Cousins, saying, "It's so frustrating, it's unbelievable." In Week 5 against the New York Giants, Thielen had a bounce-back performance, recording seven catches for 130 yards and two touchdowns in the 28–10 win. In Week 7, Thielen suffered a hamstring injury against the Lions, and was out until Week 14. Overall, Thielen finished the 2019 season with 30 receptions for 418 receiving yards and six receiving touchdowns.

In the Wild Card Round against the Saints, Thielen caught seven passes for 129 yards during the 26–20 overtime win. In the Divisional Round against the 49ers, he had five receptions for 50 receiving yards in the 27–10 loss.

==== 2020 ====
Thielen recorded six receptions for 110 receiving yards and two receiving touchdowns in a Week 1 43–34 loss to the Packers. In Week 4 against the Texans, Thielen recorded eight catches for 114 yards and a touchdown during the 31–23 win. In Week 5 against the Seattle Seahawks on Sunday Night Football, Thielen recorded nine catches for 80 yards and two touchdowns during the 27–26 loss. In Week 10 against the Bears on Monday Night Football, Thielen recorded four receptions for 43 receiving yards and two receiving touchdowns during the 19–13 win. In Week 11 against the Dallas Cowboys, Thielen recorded eight catches for 123 yards and two touchdowns, including a one-handed touchdown grab in the endzone, during the 31–28 loss. He was placed on the reserve/COVID-19 list by the team on November 23, 2020, which made him unavailable for Week 12 game against the Panthers. He was activated on December 2, 2020. Overall, Thielen finished the 2020 season with 74 receptions for 925 receiving yards and 14 receiving touchdowns. Thielen's 14 receiving touchdowns were the most in franchise history since Randy Moss had 17 in 2000. He was ranked #80 by his fellow players on the NFL Top 100 Players of 2021.

==== 2021 ====
Thielen entered the 2021 season as a starting wide receiver alongside Justin Jefferson. In Week 1, he had nine catches for 92 yards and two touchdowns in a 27–24 loss to the Cincinnati Bengals. In Week 6, he had a season-high 11 catches for 126 yards and a touchdown in a 34–28 victory over the Panthers. He suffered an ankle injury in Week 13 and missed the next two games. He returned in Week 16, only to aggravate the injury, which required surgery. He was placed on injured reserve on December 29, 2021. He finished the season with 67 catches for 726 receiving yards and ten receiving touchdowns.

==== 2022 ====
Thielen returned in 2022 as a starting wide receiver alongside Jefferson. He started all 17 games, recording 70 catches for 716 yards and six touchdowns.

Following the 2022 season, the Vikings released Thielen on March 10, 2023, as a salary cap move.

=== Carolina Panthers ===
On March 19, 2023, Thielen signed a three-year $25 million contract with the Panthers. In a Week 3 loss to the Seahawks, he had 11 receptions for 145 receiving yards and one receiving touchdown. In a Week 5 loss to the Lions, he had 11 receptions for 107 yards and a touchdown. In a Week 6 loss to the Dolphins, he had 11 receptions for 115 yards and a touchdown. He finished the 2023 season starting all 17 games and recording with 103 receptions for 1,014 receiving yards and four receiving touchdowns. He recorded his first 100-reception and 1,000-yard season since 2018.

In Week 17 of the 2024 season, Thielen had five receptions for 110 yards and two touchdowns against the Tampa Bay Buccaneers. In the 2024 season, Thielen appeared in ten games. He finished with 48 receptions for 615 yards and five touchdowns.

=== Minnesota Vikings (second stint) ===
On August 27, 2025, the Panthers traded Thielen, a conditional 2026 seventh-round pick, and a 2027 fifth-round pick to the Minnesota Vikings in exchange for a 2026 fifth-round pick and a 2027 fourth-round pick. After playing in a limited role throughout the 2025 season and recording eight catches for 69 yards in 11 games, the Vikings granted Thielen's request to be waived on December 1.

=== Pittsburgh Steelers ===
On December 2, 2025, Thielen was claimed off waivers by the Pittsburgh Steelers. He made five appearances (three starts) for Pittsburgh, recording 11 receptions for 117 yards.

On January 14, 2026, Thielen announced his retirement from professional football.

== Career statistics ==
Legend
**Bold**	Career high

=== Regular season ===
Year	Team	Games		Receiving					Rushing					Fumbles	
Year	Team	GP	GS	Rec	Yds	Avg	Lng	TD	Att	Yds	Avg	Lng	TD	Fum	Lost
2013	MIN	0	0	Did not play											
2014	MIN	16	2	8	137	**17.1**	44	1	0	0	0.0	0	0	0	0
2015	MIN	16	2	12	144	12.0	30	0	4	**89**	**22.3**	**41**	0	0	0
2016	MIN	16	10	69	967	14.0	**71**	5	2	15	7.5	11	0	2	1
2017	MIN	16	16	91	1,276	14.0	65	4	1	11	11.0	11	0	**3**	**2**
2018	MIN	16	16	**113**	**1,373**	12.2	68	9	**5**	30	6.0	15	0	1	1
2019	MIN	10	10	30	418	13.9	44	6	4	6	1.5	3	**1**	0	0
2020	MIN	15	15	72	924	12.4	51	**14**	3	15	5.0	8	0	0	0
2021	MIN	13	13	67	726	10.8	35	10	1	2	2.0	2	0	1	0
2022	MIN	17	17	70	716	10.2	36	6	1	4	4.0	4	0	0	0
2023	CAR	17	17	103	1,014	9.8	32	4	1	6	6.0	6	0	2	0
2024	CAR	10	10	48	615	12.8	40	5	0	0	0.0	0	0	0	0
2025	MIN	11	4	8	69	8.6	19	0	0	0	0.0	0	0	0	0
2025	PIT	5	3	11	117	10.6	28	0	0	0	0.0	0	0	0	0
Career		178	135	704	8,497	12.1	71	64	22	178	8.1	41	1	9	4

=== Postseason ===
Year	Team	Games		Receiving					Rushing					Fumbles	
Year	Team	GP	GS	Rec	Yds	Avg	Lng	TD	Att	Yds	Avg	Lng	TD	Fum	Lost
2015	MIN	1	0	0	0	0.0	0	0	0	0	0.0	0	0	0	0
2017	MIN	2	2	9	102	11.3	24	0	0	0	0.0	0	0	0	0
2019	MIN	2	1	**12**	**179**	14.9	**43**	0	**1**	**3**	**3.0**	**3**	0	**1**	**1**
2022	MIN	1	1	3	50	**16.7**	25	0	0	0	0.0	0	0	0	0
2025	PIT	1	0	2	25	12.5	21	0	0	0	0.0	0	0	0	0
Career		7	4	26	356	13.7	43	0	1	3	3.0	3	0	1	1

=== College ===
Season	Team	Games		Receiving					Rushing					Kick return					Punt return				
Season	Team	GP	GS	Rec	Yds	Avg	Lng	TD	Att	Yds	Avg	Lng	TD	Ret	Yds	Avg	Lng	TD	Ret	Yds	Avg	Lng	TD
2008	Minnesota State	0	0	Redshirt																			
2009	Minnesota State	9	0	21	225	10.7	42	1	0	0	0.0	0	0	0	0	0.0	0	0	0	0	0.0	0	0
2010	Minnesota State	11	11	41	686	**16.7**	**71**	6	1	7	**7.0**	7	0	0	0	0.0	0	0	11	126	**11.4**	0	0
2011	Minnesota State	12	12	62	715	11.5	45	5	2	2	1.0	2	0	**3**	**77**	**25.6**	**34**	**1**	22	217	9.9	26	0
2012	Minnesota State	14	14	**74**	**1,176**	15.9	40	**8**	**3**	**21**	**7.0**	**34**	0	1	12	12.0	12	0	**24**	**239**	10.0	**70**	**1**
Total		46	37	198	2,802	14.2	71	20	6	30	5.0	34	0	4	89	22.3	34	1	57	582	10.2	70	1

== NFL records ==
- Most consecutive games with 100+ receiving yards: 8 (tied with Calvin Johnson)
- Most consecutive games with 100+ receiving yards to begin a season: 8

== Personal life ==
Adam is married to Caitlin Thielen. They have three children. Thielen is a practicing Christian.
