= Mary Evelyn Fredenburg =

American nurse missionary (1923–2020)

- Mary Evelyn Fredenburg, from a 1963 newspaper
- Born: January 12, 1923; Detroit Lakes, Minnesota, U.S.
- Died: January 12, 2020 (aged 97); Cadiz, Kentucky, U.S.
- Other names: Mev Fredenburg, Mary E. Fredenburg
- Occupation(s): Nurse, missionary in Nigeria

Mary Evelyn "Mev" Fredenburg (January 12, 1923 – January 12, 2020) was an American nurse and a missionary in Eku, Nigeria for over forty years.

== Early life ==
Mary Evelyn Fredenburg was born in Detroit Lakes, Minnesota, the daughter of David Ralph Fredenburg and Mary Elizabeth Davies Fredenburg. Her parents were both born in North Dakota; her father was an electrician. As a girl, she moved to Orlando, Florida with her parents and younger siblings; she graduated from Orlando High School in 1940. She attended Mars Hill College, and trained as a nurse at Southern Baptist Hospital in New Orleans. She later earned a master's degree in education from the University of Minnesota while on furlough in the 1960s.

== Career ==
The Foreign Mission Board of the Southern Baptist Convention appointed Fredenburg to a mission post in Nigeria in 1947. She taught at a boys' school for two years, then worked as a registered nurse at Eku Baptist Hospital, and was director of the hospital's nursing school. She also co-founded a church, Eseroghene Baptist Church. During furloughs in the United States, she was a frequent speaker at Southern Baptist churches and events, sometimes also preparing "an African style dinner" for her audiences. She spoke at conferences on medical missions in Oklahoma in 1954, and in St. Louis, Missouri in 1963. She retired from her work in Nigeria in 1988, and ran The Shepherd's Shop, a Christian bookstore in Cadiz, Kentucky, in her retirement.

== Personal life ==
Fredenburg died in January 2020, on her 97th birthday, in Cadiz, Kentucky. The Little River Mission Board of Cadiz named a fund the "Mev Fredenburg Mission Fund" in her memory.
