= Lake Agassiz Regional Library =

Coordinates: 46.8733333°N 96.7722222°W

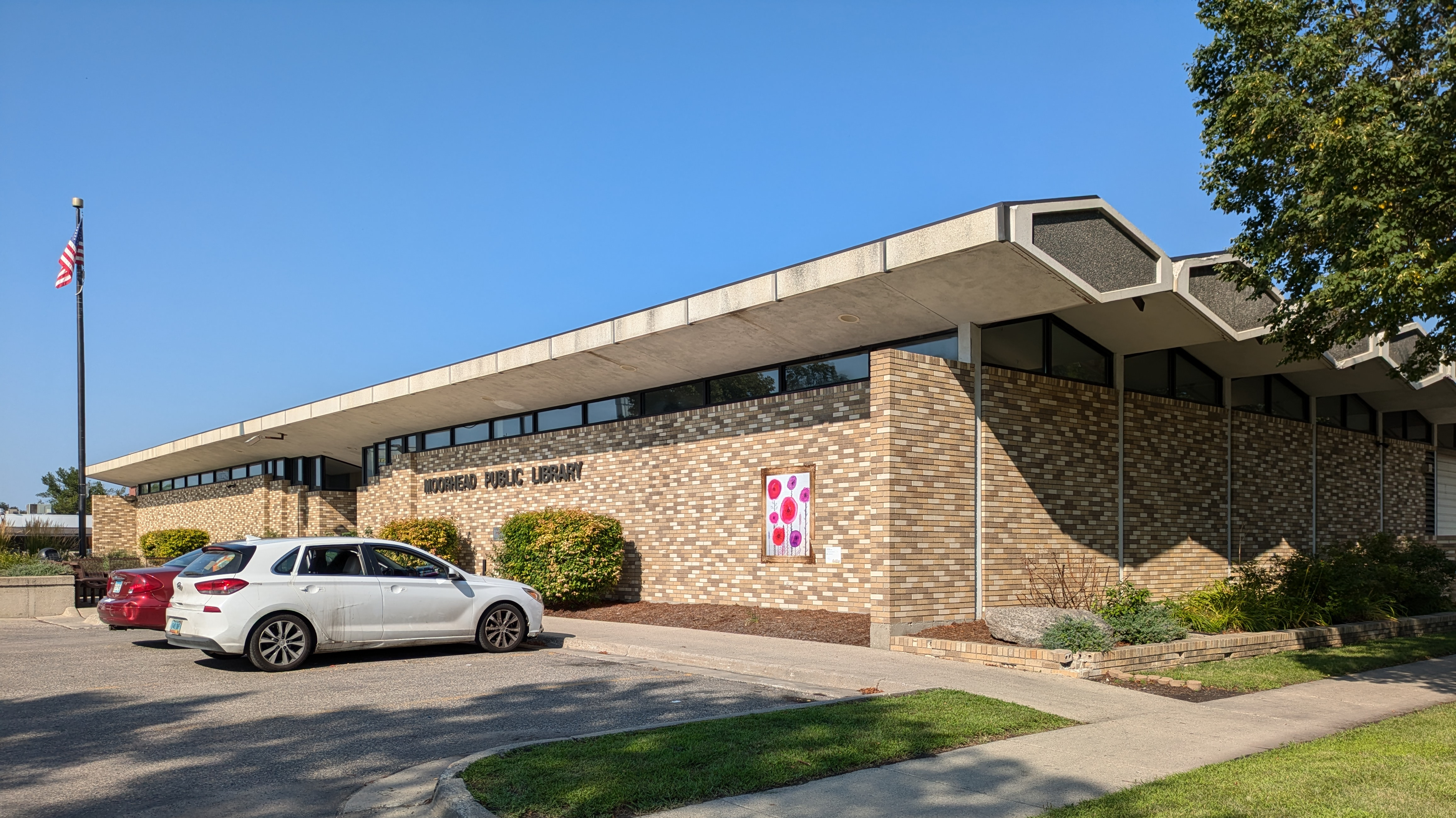
Moorhead Public Library

The Lake Agassiz Regional Library (LARL) system is a public library system in northwestern Minnesota that covers seven counties. The administrative office is located in the Moorhead branch. In total there are 13 branch libraries and 9 LINK site locations.

== History ==
The Moorhead Public Library opened on July 12, 1906. This became possible when the city of Moorhead secured a Carnegie Grant for $10,000 in 1903. The Clay County Library system was formed in 1949 and three ways of extending their services were established. They opened their services up to all county residents, they extended their library services to rural schools, and established traveling library "stations" that remained in rural towns for a few months. In 1949 they also began the Clay County Bookmobile service, one of the first bookmobiles in Minnesota.

The Lake Agassiz Regional Library system was developed in 1961 to extend library services throughout the counties in northwestern Minnesota. It was the first regional library system created in Minnesota that was formed through already existing rural libraries.

== Branch libraries ==
- Ada
- Bagley
- Barnesville
- Breckenridge
- Climax
- Crookston
- Detroit Lakes
- Fertile
- Fosston
- Hawley
- Mahnomen
- McIntosh
- Moorhead

== Link sites ==
In 2008, LARL won the Highsmith Award for Library Innovation for the development of LINK sites. LARL established 10 Library LINK sites which provide small collections, computer terminals connected to the LARL catalog, regular hours and volunteers trained and supported by library staff. In 2014, the LINK site in Shelly, MN closed due to funding issues. Nine LINK sites remain to support rural communities throughout the region.

- Cormorant
- Frazee
- Gonvick
- Halstad
- Hendrum
- Lake Park
- Rothsay
- Twin Valley
- Ulen
