= Harriet Hilreth Weeks =

American politician and teacher

Harriet Hilreth Weeks (February 28, 1875 – May 24, 1939) was an American politician and teacher.

Weeks was born in Clay County, Minnesota. She lived in Troy, New York from 1882 to 1895. Weeks married Dr. Leonard Case Weeks in 1898 and they lived in Detroit Lakes, Minnesota. She was a teacher, a member of the League of Women Voters, and a Republican. Weeks served in the Minnesota House of Representatives from 1929 to 1932.
