= Detroit Lakes Airport =

- IATA: DTL; ICAO: KDTL; FAA LID: DTL

Summary
- Airport type: Public
- Owner: City of Detroit Lakes
- Serves: Detroit Lakes, Minnesota
- Elevation AMSL: 1,414 ft (431 m)
- Coordinates: 46°49′31″N 095°53′5″W

Map
- Location of airport in Minnesota / United States DTL (the United States)

Runways
Direction	Length		Surface
Direction	ft	m	Surface
14/32	5,201	1,585	Asphalt
17/35	1,880	753	Turf

Statistics
- Aircraft operations (2010): 16,200
- Based aircraft (2017): 58
- Source: Federal Aviation Administration

Detroit Lakes Airport (IATA: DTL, ICAO: KDTL, FAA LID: DTL) is a city-owned public-use airport located two miles (3 km) west of the central business district of Detroit Lakes, a city in Becker County, Minnesota, United States.

== Facilities and aircraft ==
Detroit Lakes Airport covers an area of 288 acres (1.17 km^{2}) and contains two runways designated 13/31 with a 4,500 x 75 ft (1,372 x 23 m) asphalt surface and 17/35 with a 1,880 x 250 ft (573 x 76 m) turf surface.

For the 12-month period ending July 29, 2010, the airport had 16,200 aircraft operations, an average of 44 per day: 84% general aviation and 16% air taxi.

In March 2017, there were 58 aircraft based at this airport: 48 single-engine, 5 multi-engine, 2 jet and 3 ultralight.

=== Cargo ===
Airlines	Destinations
UPS	Minneapolis/St. Paul

== See also ==
- List of airports in Minnesota
