= Detroit Lakes, Minnesota =

City in Minnesota, United States

- City
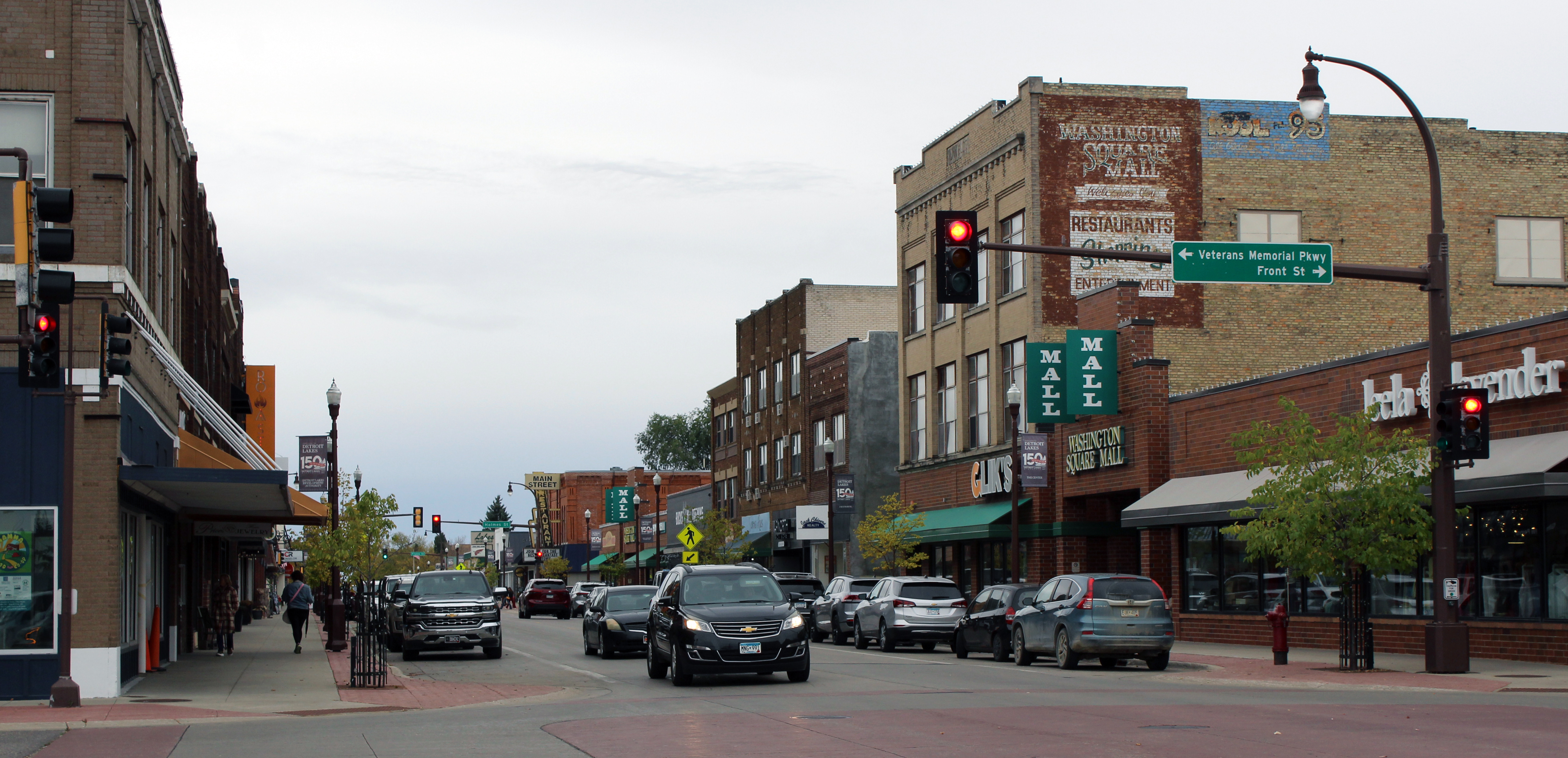
- Downtown Detroit Lakes along Washington Avenue

- Seal
- Nickname: "DL"
- Location of Detroit Lakes, Minnesota
- Coordinates: 46°49′02″N 95°50′43″W
- Country: United States
- State: Minnesota
- County: Becker
- Founded: 1871
- Incorporated (village): 1880
- Incorporated (city): 1900

Government
  - Mayor: Matt Brenk
  - Alderman (Councilmembers): Shaun Carlson; Ron Zeman; Mike Stearns; Wendy Spry; Aaron Dallmann; Matt Boeke
  - At-large: Craig Caulfield; Jaimie Deraney; Jackie Buboltz

Area
  - City: 17.460 sq mi (45.221 km^{2})
  - Land: 11.841 sq mi (30.668 km^{2})
  - Water: 5.619 sq mi (14.554 km^{2})
- Elevation: 1,371 ft (418 m)

Population (2020)
  - City: 9,869
  - Estimate (2023): 9,981
  - Density: 849.0/sq mi (327.79/km^{2})
  - Urban: 10,234
  - Metro: 35,283
- Time zone: UTC−6 (Central (CST))
  - Summer (DST): UTC−5 (CDT)
- ZIP Codes: 56501, 56502
- Area code: 218
- FIPS code: 27-15832
- GNIS feature ID: 0642777
- Sales tax: 7.375%
- Website: cityofdetroitlakes.com

Detroit Lakes is a city in and the county seat of Becker County, Minnesota, United States. The population was 9,869 at the 2020 census. Its unofficial population during the summer is higher, estimated by citizens to peak at 13,000, due to seasonal residents and tourists.

U.S. Highways 10 and 59 and Minnesota State Highway 34 are the primary routes through the city. Detroit Lakes is 45 miles east of the Fargo–Moorhead ND-MN statistical metropolitan area. The nearest major metropolitan area with a population over 1 million is Minneapolis–Saint Paul, which is about 205 miles southeast of Detroit Lakes.

Detroit Lakes is a regional summer and winter recreation destination, attracting large numbers of tourists and seasonal residents each year. Tourism is the area's chief industry.

== History ==
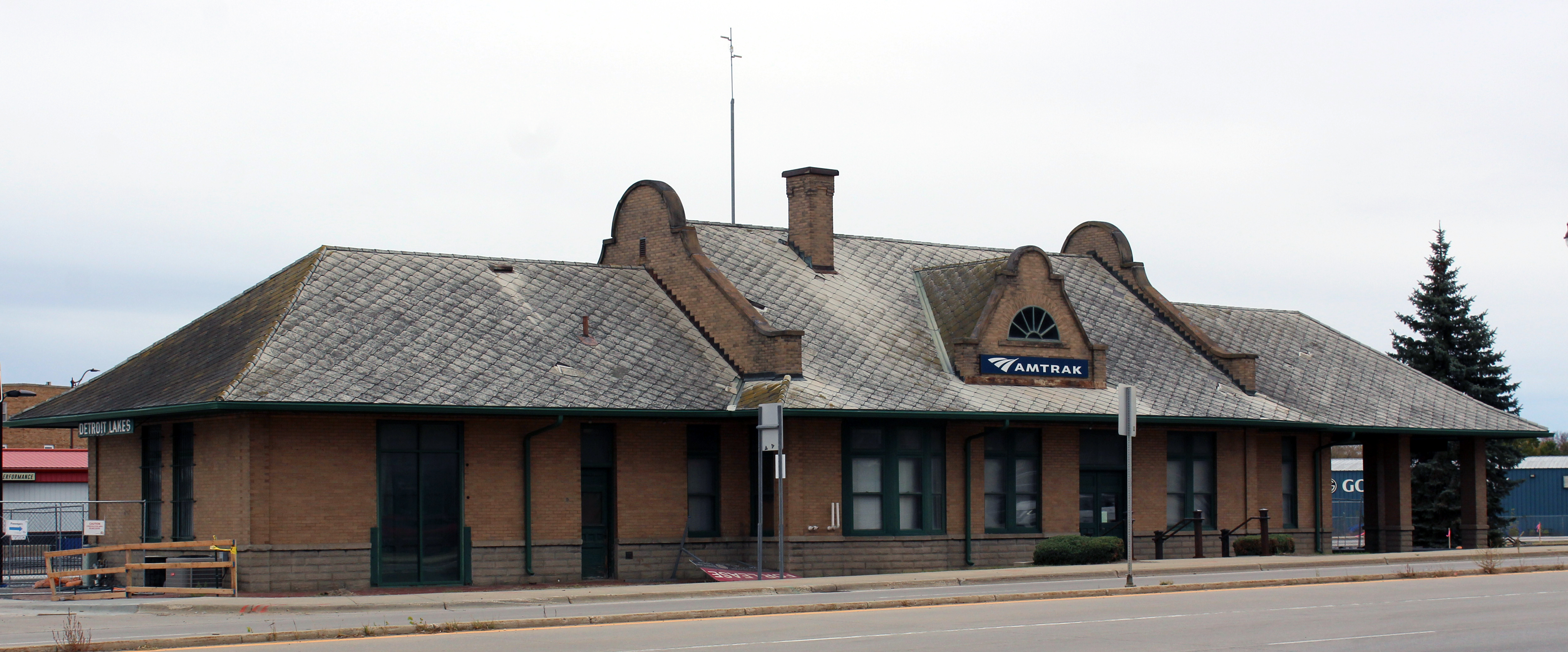
Detroit Lakes Amtrak station

Detroit Lakes was founded in 1871 by Colonel George Johnston. It was called Detroit until 1927, when it was renamed to avoid confusion with Detroit, Michigan. The name was given by a French missionary. "Détroit" means "strait" or "narrows", and refers to the sandbar separating Big Detroit lake from Little Detroit lake. In the late 19th century, the sandbar was dredged and partially submerged to make the Pelican River watershed navigable by steamboat.

Detroit Lakes was a resting place on the Red River Oxcart Trails. Its Ojibwe name is Gaiajawangag, meaning a lake with a crossing in a sandy place.

The city grew quickly with the construction of the Northern Pacific Railroad. In 1877, an election decided that Detroit Lakes, then still known as Detroit, would be the county seat. By 1884, Detroit Lakes had many businesses, including the Hotel Minnesota, the Lakes Hotel, a bank, a newspaper, and an opera house. The first county courthouse was also built in Detroit Lakes that year. Some of the city's historic buildings still stand, such as the 1908 railroad station and the Holmes Theater. The Becker County Museum, now an addition to the Holmes Theater, has information and exhibits on the history of the city and the surrounding area.

== Geography ==
According to the United States Census Bureau, the city has an area of 17.460 square miles (45.22 km^{2}), of which 11.841 square miles (30.67 km^{2}) is land and 5.619 square miles (14.55 km^{2}) is water. See also Detroit Lake (Minnesota).

== Climate ==
Detroit Lakes can see severe weather such as Tornados.

Climate data for Detroit Lakes, Minnesota (1991–2020 normals, extremes 1895–present)
Month	Jan	Feb	Mar	Apr	May	Jun	Jul	Aug	Sep	Oct	Nov	Dec	Year
Record high °F (°C)	55 (13)	59 (15)	77 (25)	95 (35)	97 (36)	100 (38)	110 (43)	105 (41)	100 (38)	91 (33)	75 (24)	60 (16)	110 (43)
Mean maximum °F (°C)	39.4 (4.1)	37.6 (3.1)	51.0 (10.6)	72.1 (22.3)	80.4 (26.9)	85.5 (29.7)	95.7 (35.4)	90.8 (32.7)	77.1 (25.1)	71.7 (22.1)	55.9 (13.3)	35.4 (1.9)	95.7 (35.4)
Mean daily maximum °F (°C)	17.2 (−8.2)	22.7 (−5.2)	35.5 (1.9)	52.0 (11.1)	66.4 (19.1)	75.5 (24.2)	79.2 (26.2)	77.7 (25.4)	69.5 (20.8)	53.1 (11.7)	36.7 (2.6)	22.4 (−5.3)	50.7 (10.4)
Daily mean °F (°C)	6.8 (−14.0)	11.5 (−11.4)	25.4 (−3.7)	40.6 (4.8)	54.4 (12.4)	64.3 (17.9)	68.3 (20.2)	66.5 (19.2)	57.9 (14.4)	43.3 (6.3)	27.9 (−2.3)	14.0 (−10.0)	40.1 (4.5)
Mean daily minimum °F (°C)	−3.6 (−19.8)	0.2 (−17.7)	15.4 (−9.2)	29.1 (−1.6)	42.4 (5.8)	53.1 (11.7)	57.5 (14.2)	55.3 (12.9)	46.3 (7.9)	33.5 (0.8)	19.2 (−7.1)	5.6 (−14.7)	29.5 (−1.4)
Mean minimum °F (°C)	−24.6 (−31.4)	−19.4 (−28.6)	−13.7 (−25.4)	13.5 (−10.3)	30.2 (−1.0)	42.3 (5.7)	47.1 (8.4)	41.5 (5.3)	31.9 (−0.1)	18.4 (−7.6)	−6.5 (−21.4)	−18.2 (−27.9)	−24.6 (−31.4)
Record low °F (°C)	−44 (−42)	−45 (−43)	−35 (−37)	−12 (−24)	15 (−9)	28 (−2)	33 (1)	31 (−1)	15 (−9)	−10 (−23)	−32 (−36)	−48 (−44)	−48 (−44)
Average precipitation inches (mm)	0.82 (21)	0.66 (17)	0.96 (24)	2.03 (52)	3.73 (95)	4.90 (124)	4.35 (110)	3.26 (83)	3.55 (90)	2.84 (72)	1.37 (35)	0.98 (25)	29.45 (748)
Average precipitation days (≥ 0.01 in)	6.2	7.2	7.1	7.8	11.9	13.1	10.9	9.2	10.2	9.6	7.2	9.4	109.8
Source: NOAA

== Demographics ==
Historical population
Census	Pop.	Note	%±
1880	554		—
1890	1,510		172.6%
1900	2,060		36.4%
1910	2,807		36.3%
1920	3,426		22.1%
1930	3,675		7.3%
1940	5,015		36.5%
1950	5,787		15.4%
1960	5,633		−2.7%
1970	5,797		2.9%
1980	7,106		22.6%
1990	6,635		−6.6%
2000	7,348		10.7%
2010	8,569		16.6%
2020	9,869		15.2%
2023 (est.)	9,981		1.1%
U.S. Decennial Census; 2020 Census

As of the 2023 American Community Survey, there are 4,485 estimated households in Detroit Lakes with an average of 2.15 persons per household. The city has a median household income of $62,123. Approximately 10.2% of the city's population lives at or below the poverty line. Detroit Lakes has an estimated 60.1% employment rate, with 32.4% of the population holding a bachelor's degree or higher and 93.5% holding a high school diploma.

The top five reported ancestries (people were allowed to report up to two ancestries, thus the figures will generally add to more than 100%) were Scandinavian (98.1%), Spanish (0.9%), Indo-European (0.6%), Asian and Pacific Islander (0.1%), and Other (0.3%).

The median age in the city was 41.5 years.

=== Racial and ethnic composition ===
Detroit Lakes, Minnesota – racial and ethnic composition Note: the US Census treats Hispanic/Latino as an ethnic category. This table excludes Latinos from the racial categories and assigns them to a separate category. Hispanics/Latinos may be of any race.
Race / ethnicity (NH = non-Hispanic)	Pop. 2000	Pop. 2010	Pop. 2020	% 2000	% 2010	% 2020
White alone (NH)	6,723	7,701	8,331	91.49%	89.87%	84.42%
Black or African American alone (NH)	29	57	124	0.39%	0.67%	1.26%
Native American or Alaska Native alone (NH)	325	359	393	4.42%	4.19%	3.98%
Asian alone (NH)	39	67	98	0.53%	0.78%	0.99%
Pacific Islander alone (NH)	1	5	4	0.01%	0.06%	0.04%
Other race alone (NH)	9	10	34	0.12%	0.12%	0.34%
Mixed race or multiracial (NH)	134	230	646	1.82%	2.68%	6.55%
Hispanic or Latino (any race)	88	140	239	1.20%	1.63%	2.42%
Total	7,348	8,569	9,869	100.00%	100.00%	100.00%

=== 2020 census ===
As of the 2020 census, Detroit Lakes had a population of 9,869, with 4,462 households and 2,400 families residing in the city. The median age was 41.4 years. 6.5% of residents were under the age of 5, 22.1% were under the age of 18, and 24.2% were 65 years of age or older. For every 100 females there were 90.7 males, and for every 100 females age 18 and over there were 87.5 males age 18 and over.

93.3% of residents lived in urban areas, while 6.7% lived in rural areas.

Of the city's households, 24.3% had children under the age of 18 living in them. Of all households, 37.4% were married-couple households, 20.3% were households with a male householder and no spouse or partner present, and 34.5% were households with a female householder and no spouse or partner present. About 40.4% of all households were made up of individuals and 20.0% had someone living alone who was 65 years of age or older.

There were 5,205 housing units, of which 14.3% were vacant. The homeowner vacancy rate was 1.9% and the rental vacancy rate was 3.9%. The population density was 887.7 inhabitants per square mile (342.7/km^{2}), and there were 468.2 per square mile (180.8/km^{2}) housing units.

=== 2010 census ===
As of the 2010 census, there were 8,569 people, 3,864 households, and 2,093 families residing in the city. The population density was 838.5 inhabitants per square mile (323.7/km^{2}). There were 4,535 housing units at an average density of 443.7 per square mile (171.3/km^{2}). The racial makeup of the city was 90.57% White, 0.72% African American, 4.38% Native American, 0.78% Asian, 0.06% Pacific Islander, 0.57% from some other races and 2.92% from two or more races. Hispanic or Latino people of any race were 1.63% of the population.

There were 3,864 households, of which 25.8% had children under the age of 18 living with them, 38.5% were married couples living together, 11.4% had a female householder with no husband present, 4.2% had a male householder with no wife present, and 45.8% were non-families. 39.3% of all households were made up of individuals, and 19.1% had someone living alone who was 65 years of age or older. The average household size was 2.13 and the average family size was 2.84.

The median age in the city was 41.6 years. 22% of residents were under the age of 18; 8.5% were between the ages of 18 and 24; 23.2% were from 25 to 44; 24.6% were from 45 to 64; and 21.8% were 65 years of age or older. The gender makeup of the city was 47.2% male and 52.8% female.

=== 2000 census ===
As of the 2000 census, there were 7,348 people, 3,319 households, and 1,845 families residing in the city. The population density was 980.4 inhabitants per square mile (378.5/km^{2}). There were 3,782 housing units at an average density of 504.6 per square mile (194.8/km^{2}). The racial makeup of the city was 91.98% White, 4.50% Native American, 0.53% Asian American, 0.42% African American, 0.01% Pacific Islander, 0.59% from other races, and 1.96% from two or more races. Hispanic or Latino people of any race were 1.20% of the population.

There were 3,319 households, out of which 26.1% had children under the age of 18 living with them, 42.6% were married couples living together, 9.7% had a female householder with no husband present, and 44.4% were non-families. 40.2% of all households were made up of individuals, and 21.6% had someone living alone who was 65 years of age or older. The average household size was 2.13 and the average family size was 2.86.

In the city, the population was spread out, with 22.8% under the age of 18, 7.5% from 18 to 24, 24.4% from 25 to 44, 21.6% from 45 to 64, and 23.7% who were 65 years of age or older. The median age was 42 years. For every 100 females, there were 84.4 males. For every 100 females age 18 and over, there were 81.2 males.

The median income for a household in the city was $29,264, and the median income for a family was $42,267. Males had a median income of $28,939 versus $21,439 for females. The per capita income for the city was $18,509. About 9.9% of families and 15.0% of the population were below the poverty line, including 22.2% of those under age 18 and 13.9% of those age 65 or over.

== Government ==
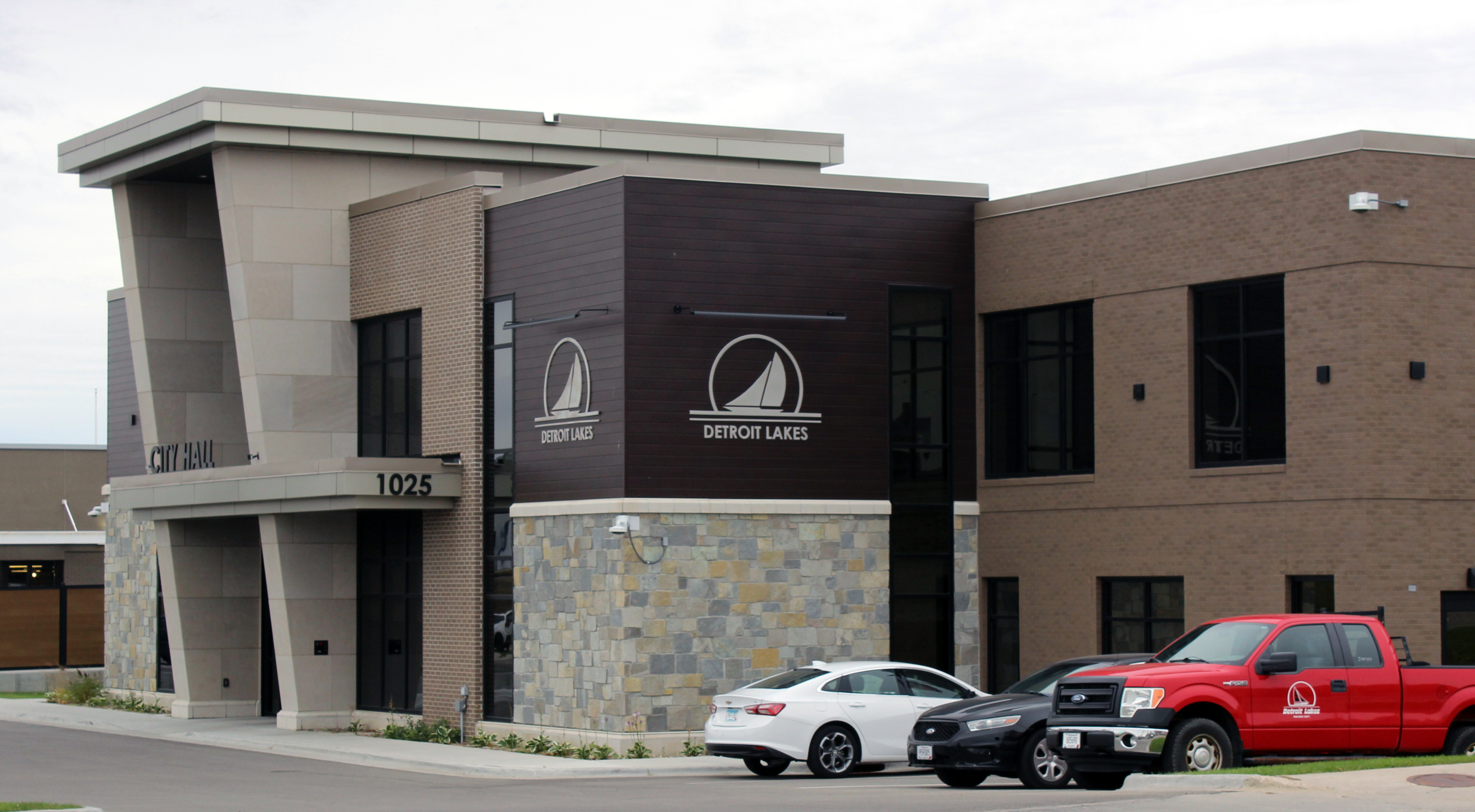
City Hall

Detroit Lakes is the county seat of Becker County and has the county courthouse and law enforcement center. District headquarters for the Minnesota Department of Transportation and the Minnesota State Patrol are also in the city.

A nine-member City Council serves the city, with the mayor voting in case of a tie. There are three wards, with two council members serving each and three serving at large.

There are 14 city boards and commissions, including the Park Board, Library Board, Public Utilities Commission, Planning Commission, Police Civil Service Commission, the Housing and Redevelopment Authority, the Airport Commission, and the Tourism Bureau.

Detroit Lakes is in Minnesota's 7th congressional district, represented by Michelle Fischbach. It is in Minnesota Senate District 4, represented by Rob Kupec, and Minnesota House District 4B, represented by Jim Joy.

== Education ==
=== Higher education ===
The Detroit Lakes campus of the Minnesota State Community and Technical College system is one of four campus locations (others are in Moorhead, Fergus Falls, and Wadena). The Detroit Lakes campus, on Minnesota Highway 34, has about 650 students in 25 degree programs. The college offers both classroom and online distance education programs and grants AAS, AS, diploma, certificate, and AFA degrees. On October 6th, 2026, it was announced that the Detroit Lakes campus would close as soon as summer 2028.

=== K–12 ===
- Rossman Elementary School (K–5)
- Roosevelt Elementary School (K–5)
- Detroit Lakes Middle School (6–8)
- Detroit Lakes High School (9–12)
- Lakes Area Learning Center Alternative High School (ALC) (9–12)
- Holy Rosary Catholic School (K–8) (Private)
- Faith Christian School (K–8) (Private)
- Adventist Christian School (K–8) (Private)

=== Carnegie Library ===
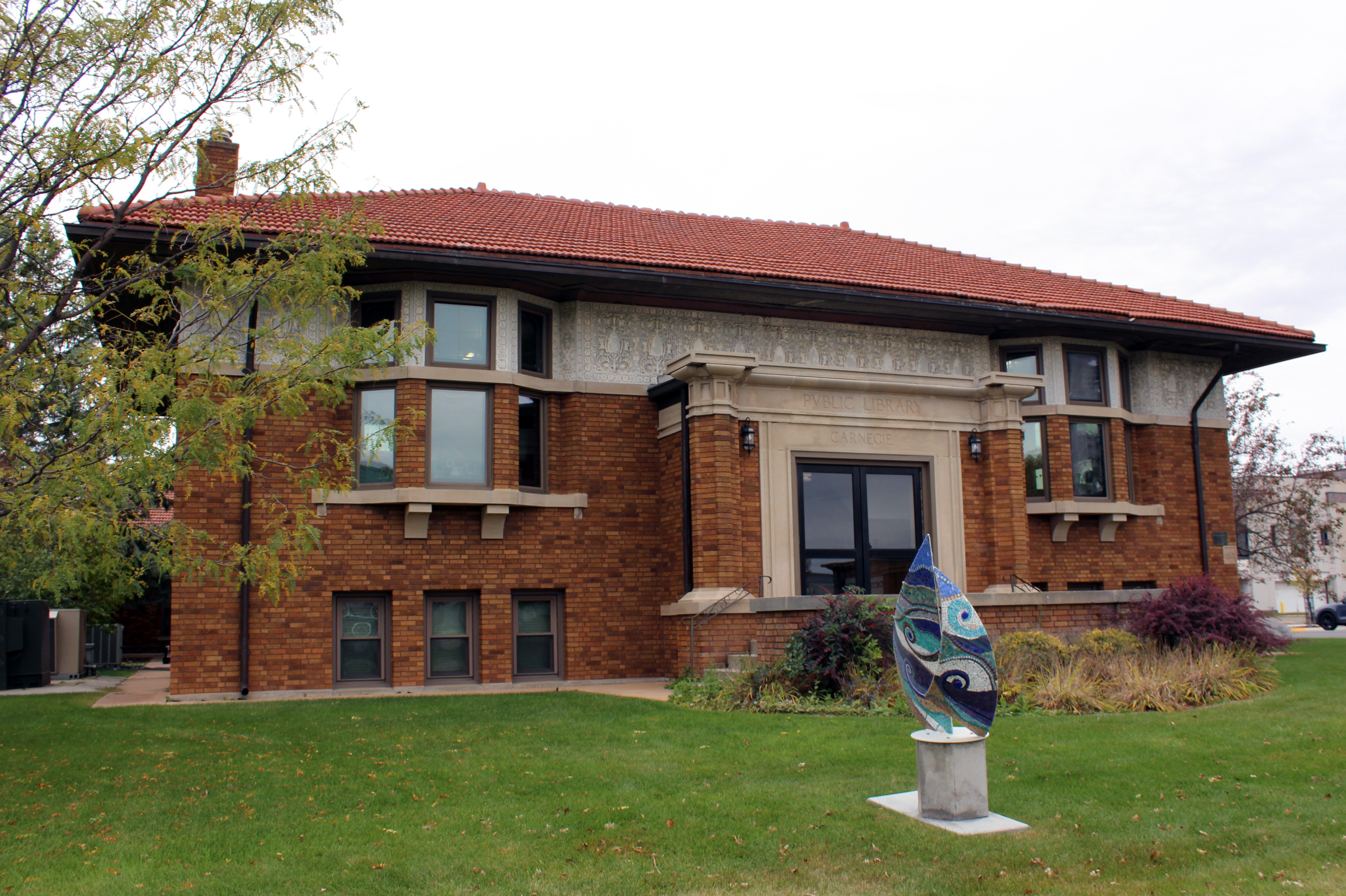
Carnegie Public Library

Built in 1913 with a $10,000 grant from the Andrew Carnegie Foundation, the Detroit Lakes Public Library is a branch of the Lake Agassiz Regional Library Network (LARL). Originally 4,142 square feet (384.8 m^{2}) on two floors, the library was designed by the architectural firm of Claude and Starck of Madison, Wisconsin. The building is on the National Register of Historic Places. It features a Louis Sullivan exterior frieze, lead and stained-glass windows and doors, and a completely open and unobstructed interior. Designed in the Prairie School architectural style popularized by such architects as Louis Sullivan and Frank Lloyd Wright, it is also noted for its orange clay-tiled hip roof that defies regional construction convention. In 1985, the original building was expanded.

== Architecture ==
=== National Register of Historic Places ===
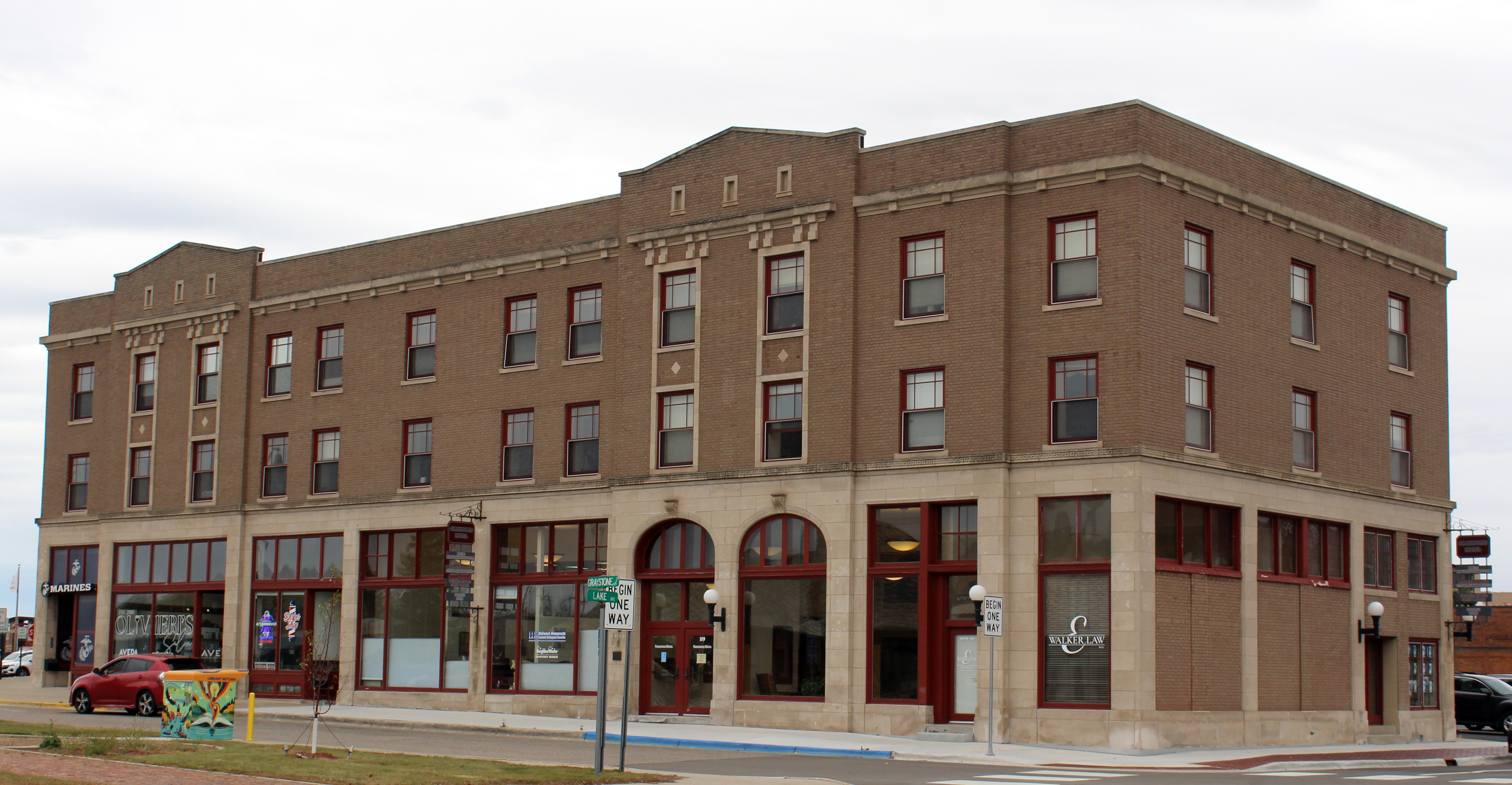
Historic Graystone Hotel

Numerous works of architecture and engineering in Detroit Lakes have been added to the National Register of Historic Places. The Detroit Lakes Carnegie Library of the Prairie School architectural style, by architects Claude and Starck, was added to the Register in 1976. The Graystone Hotel was added in 1999. The Amtrak Depot, formerly the Northern Pacific Passenger Depot, was added in 1988. The Homer E. Sargent House on Lake Avenue, a privately owned domestic dwelling of the Queen Anne architectural style, was added in 1988. The Edgewater Beach Cottages, also known as Stovewood Cottages, by architects George Jewell and Frederick Wright, were added in 1989. Fairyland Cottages Historic District on W. Lake Shore Drive was added in 1989. The Holmes Block (also known as the Opera House Block), including downtown commercial buildings at 710–718 Washington Avenue, was added in 2001.

== Economy ==
The city's economy is largely driven by summer tourism and seasonal population increases. A variety of health care services, retail stores, and service businesses are available to area residents and tourists. Detroit Lakes has about 15 chain and independent hotels. Numerous resorts in the area provide additional units. The city's downtown has a 135,000-square-foot (12,500 m^{2}) shopping center, including Washington Square Mall. Most newer chain retail businesses, including discount and home centers, restaurants, and strip malls, are along Highways 10 and 59. The city is also home to a number of businesses servicing tourism ranging from sporting goods retailers to amusement parks and river tubing companies. With two industrial parks in the city's outskirts, it is also home to many manufacturing and industrial businesses.

=== Top employers ===
According to the City's 2023 Annual Comprehensive Financial Report, the city's largest employers are:

#	Employer	Type of Business	# of Employees	Percentage
1	Essentia Health/St. Mary's Hospital	Health Care	918	4.7%
2	Detroit Lakes Public Schools ISD #22	Education	650	3.3%
3	Lakeshirts Screen Printing	Shirt Screen Printing	506	2.6%
4	BTD Manufacturing	Metal Fabrication	502	2.6%
5	Becker County	Government	372	1.9%
6	Walmart	Retail Store	362	1.9%
7	Minnesota Department of Transportation	Highway Maintenance	270	1.4%
8	Menards	Retail Store	161	0.8%
9	Sanford Health	Health Care	160	0.8%
10	Ecumen	Nursing Home & Assisted Living	150	0.8%
11	Central Market	Grocery Store	150	0.8%
—	Total employers	—	4,201	21.6%

== Recreation ==
In and around Detroit Lakes are several lakes used for fishing, boating, wake sports, sailing, jet-skiing, swimming, and freshwater scuba diving. Most prominent and heavily used is Detroit Lake, which features the mile-long city beach. The beach annually hosts the city's Independence Day celebration and fireworks display. In and around Detroit Lakes are 14 golf courses. The area also features an amusement park, a paintball arena, two river tubing companies, and a horseback riding ranch. The city also hosts the annual Becker County Fair. The Shrine Circus performs in Detroit Lakes each year at the Kent Freeman Arena. In the winter, the area is a popular destination for ice fishing, snowmobiling, cross country skiing, and downhill skiing and snowboarding at the Detroit Mountain Recreation Area. The city is one of perhaps three in the U.S. that have a park dedicated to the Grand Army of the Republic (rededicated on April 15, 2015).

== Culture ==
=== Historic Holmes Theatre ===
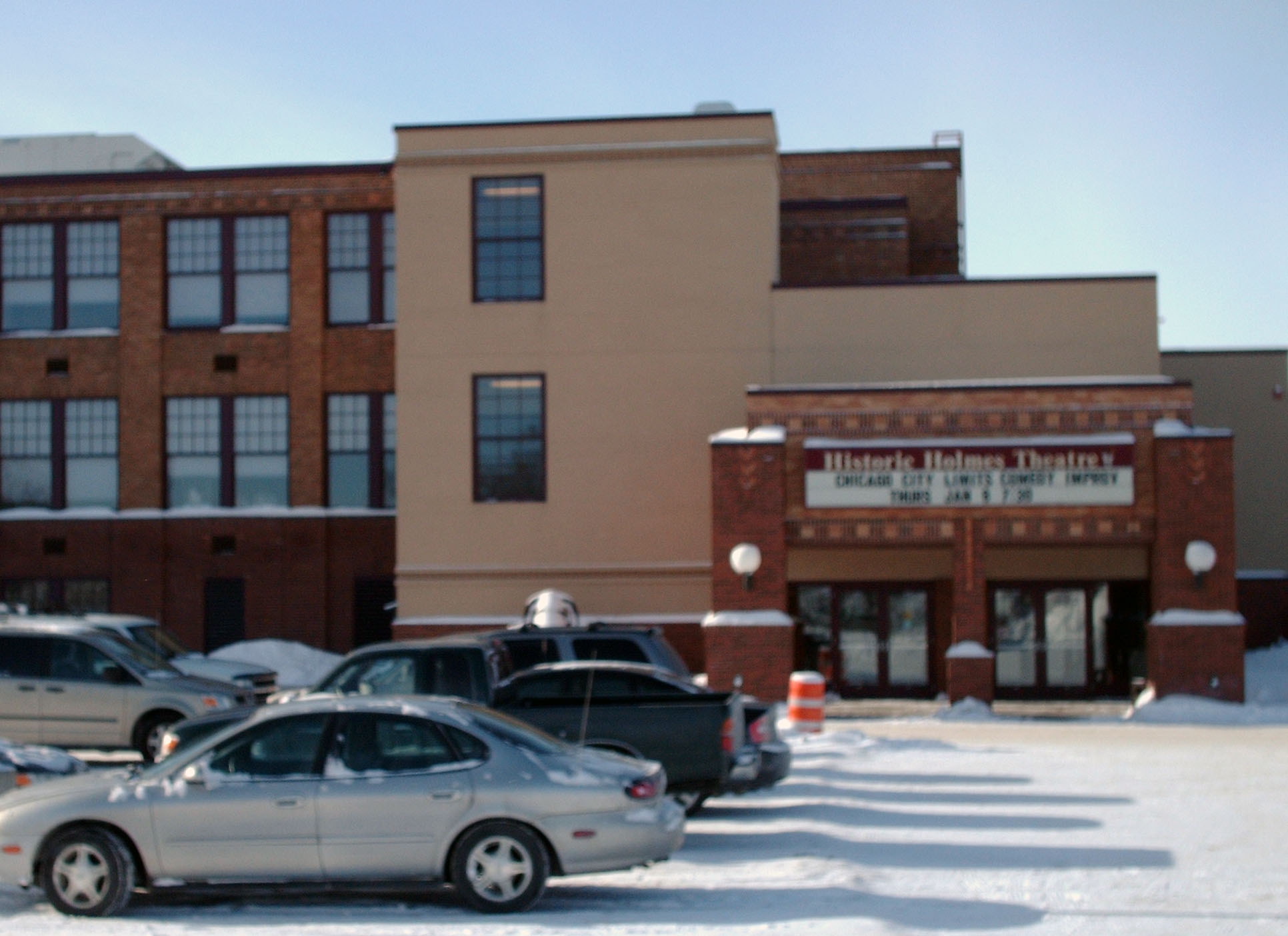
Main entrance to the Historic Holmes Theatre in winter

The Historic Holmes Theatre, a physical and organizational branch of the Detroit Lakes Community and Cultural Center complex, is an Art Deco theatre that hosts year-round music, drama, and dance performances. Seating nearly 1,000, the theatre features a wide variety of national and international touring shows (including Arlo Guthrie, the Chinese Golden Acrobats, the New York Theatre Ballet, and the Guthrie Theater), local performing groups (Playhouse 412, Fargo/Moorhead Jazz Arts Group, Wadena Madhatters), and events (wedding receptions, business meetings, and the Annual Festival of the Birds).

=== Music festivals ===
Each August since 1983, the city has hosted WE Fest, a three-day camping and country music festival. Campgrounds packed with tents surround a large stage. WE Fest attracts around 50,000 people each year. In 2007, the attendance reached a record high of 83,000 for the themed "Heavin in '07" concert. WE Fest is held at the Soo Pass Ranch, south of Detroit Lakes on Highway 59.

Formerly held in July each year at the Soo Pass Ranch, the 10,000 Lakes Festival was put on hiatus in 2009. According to 10KLF.com, the festival did not succeed financially.

=== Community & Cultural Center ===
The Community & Cultural Center is in a completely renovated brick building that once was the Holmes School. Its fitness center features an 8-lane Olympic regulation pool, an indoor track, a fieldhouse with two basketball courts, a weight room, cardio fitness center, racquetball courts, and a golf driving/putting range. The old 1931 school building houses the renovated 837-seat Historic Holmes Theatre featuring orchestra and balcony-level seating and conference rooms. The 105,000 square feet (9,800 m^{2}) building was completed in 2001 at a cost of $9.5 million.

== Religion ==
There are several Christian churches in and around Detroit Lakes. In greatest number are Lutheran churches of varied synods. In addition to Holy Rosary Church and St. Mary of the Lakes (Roman Catholic), the city has one of each of the following denominational churches: Episcopal Church, United Methodist, Assemblies of God, United Church of Christ, Mennonite, The Church of Jesus Christ of Latter-day Saints, Jehovah's Witnesses, Seventh-day Adventist Church, Community Alliance Church Christian & Missionary Alliance, Vineyard Church. There is also an interdenominational Christian Fellowship Church. No non-Christian religious denominations have places of worship in Detroit Lakes.

== Local media ==
=== Radio ===
FM

FM radio stations
Frequency	Call sign	Name	Format	Owner
88.1 FM	KAWD (LPFM)	LPFM	Religious	Christian Media, Inc,
89.1 FM	KNNZ	89.1 Ken's FM	Adult Contemporary	Pioneer Public Broadcasting Company, Inc
89.9 FM	KKWE	Niijii Radio	Variety	White Earth Land Recovery Project
90.3 FM	KCCD	MPR	Public Radio	Minnesota Public Radio
91.1 FM	KCCM	MPR	Classical	Minnesota Public Radio
93.1 FM	K226CA KDLM-AM	KDLM	Adult Contemporary	Leighton Broadcasting
94.5 FM	KDLB	Bob FM	Country	Radio Fargo-Moorhead, Inc.
95.1 FM	KBVB	Bob FM	Country	Radio Fargo-Moorhead, Inc.
96.5 FM	KJJK	Kj Country 96.5 FM	Country	Leighton Radio Holdings, Inc.
97.5 FM	KDKK	Star Station - Music of Life	Nostalgia	Ec Broadcasting
98.7 FM	KLTA	Big 98.7	Hot Adult Contemporary	Radio Fargo-Moorhead, Inc.
99.5 FM	KPRW	The Lakes 99.5	Hot Adult Contemporary	Leighton Radio Holdings, Inc.
99.9 FM	KVOX	Froggy 99.9	Country	Midwest Communications, Inc.
102.3 FM	KRCQ	Real Country 102	Country	Leighton Enterprises, Inc.
103.3 FM	KZCR	Z 103.3	Classic Rock	Leighton Radio Holdings, Inc.
104.1 FM	KBOT	Wave 104.1	Adult Contemporary	Leighton Enterprises, Inc.
105.1 FM	KQWB	Q105.1 Rocks	Rock	Radio Fargo-Moorhead, Inc.
105.9 FM	KKWS	Superstation K106	Country	HBI Radio Brainerd/Wadena, LLC
106.5 FM	KRJB	Your Sports Channel	Sports	R&J Broadcasting, Inc.
106.9 FM	KEGK	106.9 The Eagle	Classic Hits	Radio Wahpeton Breckenridge, LLC
107.9 FM	KPFX	The Fox	Classic Rock	Radio Fargo-Moorhead, Inc.

=== Television ===
- TV3: Lakes Area Television (News/Local Programming)
  TV3 is a "commercial supported Public-access television cable TV station" that broadcasts out of Detroit Lakes for the regional Arvig Communication Cable System.

=== Newspaper ===
The Forum Communications Company of Fargo, North Dakota, owns and operates the Detroit Lakes Tribune (published twice weekly) and the regional daily newspaper, The Forum of Fargo-Moorhead, with coverage spanning the Fargo–Moorhead metropolitan area and much of northwest Minnesota and northeast North Dakota.

- The Forum of Fargo-Moorhead (daily)
- The Detroit Lakes Tribune (published Saturdays)
- White Earth - Anishinaabeg Today

== Transportation ==
- Amtrak Empire Builder (stops daily at Detroit Lakes' Amtrak station)
- Jefferson Lines Intercity Bus Line
- Detroit Lakes Airport

== In popular culture ==
In John Steinbeck's book Travels with Charley, depicting his 1960 road trip across the U.S. with his dog, Charley, Steinbeck passes through and stays the night near Detroit Lakes.

A postcard depicting the Fairyland Cottages in Detroit Lakes appears in the opening credits of the 1983 movie National Lampoon's Vacation. The cabins were destroyed in 2008 by the Detroit Lakes Fire Department, in a training exercise. It is now home to a condominium complex.

A fictional version of Detroit Lakes's courthouse and rural countryside appears in Ali Selim's 2006 film Sweet Land, about a German immigrant's settlement in Becker County in the aftermath of World War I. The scene was filmed in Montevideo, Minnesota.

Ed Schultz, former MSNBC anchor of The Ed Show, often taped or broadcast his show live from a studio in Detroit Lakes.

The 2016 Netflix documentary The Seventh Fire, about gang culture on American Indian reservations, was filmed in Detroit Lakes, surrounding towns, and the nearby White Earth Indian Reservation.

The popular YouTube channel CBOYSTV films is headquartered at Cormorant Lake, eight miles east of Detroit Lake. CBoysTV is a comedy and motorsports channel with over 1 million subscribers.

== Notable people ==
- Tillie Anderson, prominent in bicycle racing in the 1890s, spent summers at a lakeside cabin, died there in 1965
- Dick Beardsley, marathon runner, motivational speaker and author, third-fastest American-born male marathon runner, Grandma's Marathon record holder, Boston Marathon silver medalist (1982), founder of Dick Beardsley Running Company, formerly resided in Detroit Lakes
- Jason Blake, retired NHL player, resides in Detroit Lakes
- James Evans, Minnesota state legislator, resided in Detroit Lakes
- Mary Evelyn Fredenburg, nurse missionary in Nigeria, born in Detroit Lakes in 1923
- Phil Hansen, retired NFL player, Buffalo Bills defensive end 1991–2001, three-time Super Bowl participant, resides in Detroit Lakes
- Jessica Lange, Oscar-winning actress, briefly resided in Detroit Lakes, where she attended her junior year of high school (ca. 1966)
- Collin Peterson, former Congressman, chair of House Agriculture Committee, Democratic-Farmer-Labor Party, 7th Congressional District of Minnesota, resides in Detroit Lakes
- Dennis Poppenhagen, Minnesota state legislator and businessman, resides in Detroit Lakes
- Dave Reichert, former Congressman, Republican Party, 8th Congressional District of Washington, was born in Detroit Lakes
- Ed Schultz, former syndicated talk radio host, cable news anchor of The Ed Show on MSNBC, seasonally resided in Detroit Lakes until his death in 2018
- Caroline Smith, musician, singer/songwriter for Indie Rock band Caroline Smith and the Goodnight Sleeps, grew up in Detroit Lakes
- Adam Thielen, wide receiver for the Minnesota Vikings of the National Football League, was born and grew up in Detroit Lakes
- Loren P. Thompson, Minnesota state legislator, resided in Detroit Lakes from 2009 until his death
- Harriet Hilreth Weeks, Minnesota state legislator, resided in Detroit Lakes
