= Orlando High School =

Location
- 800 East Robinson Street; Orlando, Florida, 32801; United States; 28.54527°N 81.36692°W

Information
- Type: Public high school
- Established: 1892
- Closed: 1952
- School district: Orange County Public Schools
- Grades: 9-12
- Campus type: Urban
- Colors: Orange and green
- Mascot: Tiger
- Nickname: Tigers
- Yearbook: Tigando
- Communities served: Orlando

Orlando High School was a high school located in Orlando, Florida, United States.

== History ==
The first high school class, which was composed of 11 students, met in the second story of a frame schoolhouse graduated in 1892. In 1921 the school was relocated to a red brick building designed by Frederick H. Trimble on North Parramore Avenue.

In 1952, Orlando High School closed, with students being split to two new schools, which were to be named North Orlando High School and South Orlando High School. On the final day of classes at OHS, the principal, William Boone, died of a heart attack at his desk, after serving 31 years as the school's only principal at that location. South Orlando chose the name of William R. Boone High School in his honor. North Orlando chose the name Edgewater High School. In 1987, the building was repurposed as Howard Middle School.

== Notable alumni ==
- Buddy Ebsen, actor
- Mary Evelyn Fredenburg, nurse missionary in Nigeria
- Pete Pihos, football player and coach
- John Young, astronaut, during Apollo 16 became the ninth person to walk on the Moon
