= Detroit Lakes High School =

Location
- Detroit Lakes, Minnesota; United States; 46°48′30″N 95°50′14″W

Information
- Type: Public
- Motto: "Make it a Great Day or Not, The Choice is Yours" (former principal Steve Morben)
- Established: 1980
- School district: Detroit Lakes Public Schools
- Principal: Jill Walter
- Teaching staff: 54.33 (FTE)
- Grades: 9–12
- Enrollment: 851 (2023–2024)
- Student to teacher ratio: 15.66
- Colors: Red and White
- Song: Laker Victory
- Mascot: Sailboat
- Website: https://hs.dlschools.net/

Detroit Lakes High School is a public high school located in Detroit Lakes, Minnesota, United States. It serves approximately 900 students and is a part of the Detroit Lakes Public Schools system. The school colors are red and white and the athletic teams are known as "The Lakers". It is the largest high school in Becker County. The original school was Holmes School (K-12), founded 1895, named after Elon G. Holmes. In 1980, Holmes school was turned into the Historic Holmes theater and the Detroit Lakes Community and Cultural Center, and Detroit lakes high school was formed.

== Notable alumni ==
- Jeff Johnson, Class of 1985, former state representative, 2014 and 2018 Republican gubernatorial nominee
- Julius J. Olson, DLHS Class of 1897 (Original Holmes School), Minnesota Supreme Court justice
- Adam Thielen, DLHS Class of 2008, NFL wide receiver, Minnesota Vikings
- Amber Estenson, opera singer and social media influencer
